= MV Dartmouth Castle =

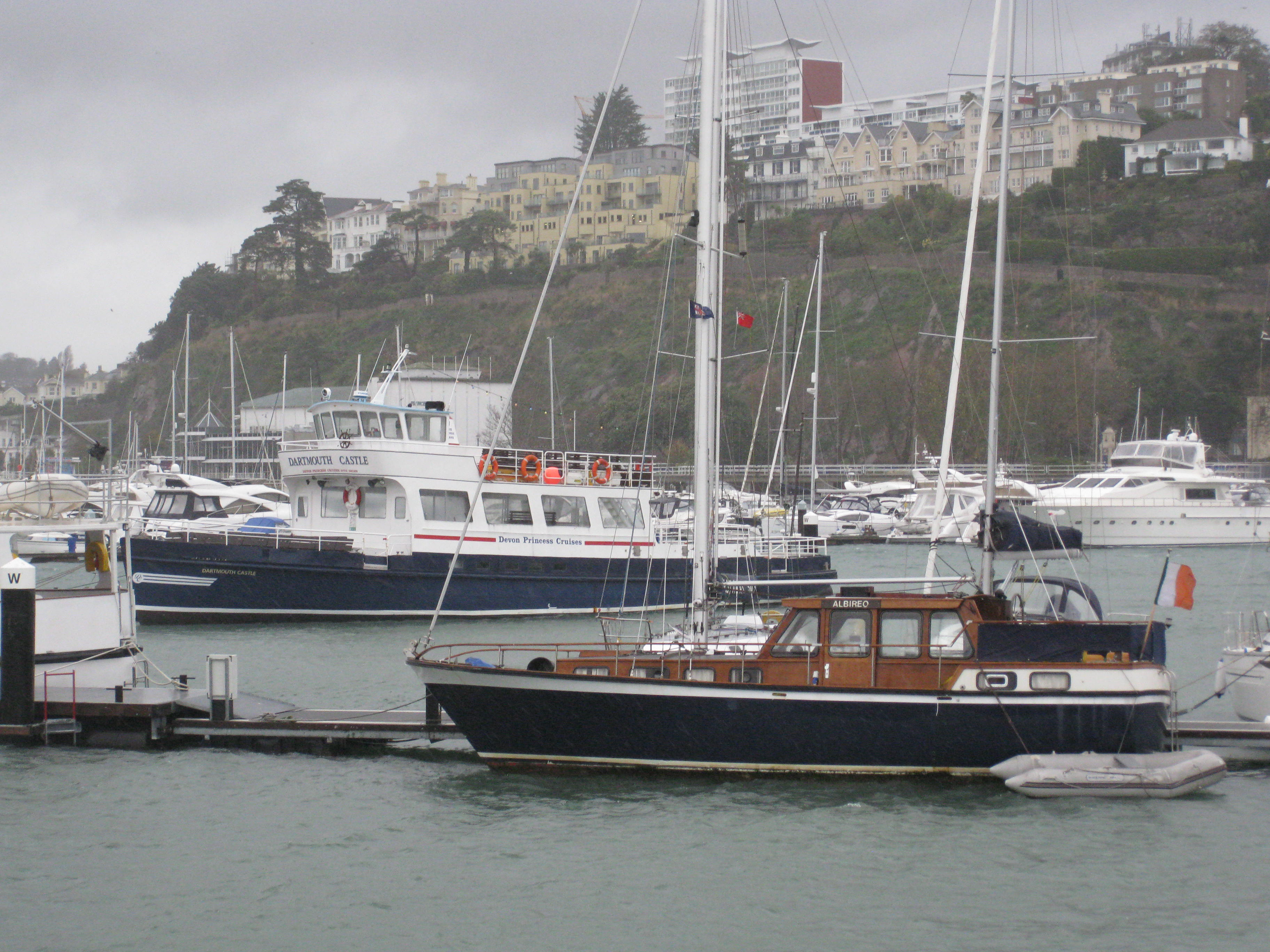
- MV Dartmouth Castle laid up in Torquay during her Devon Princess Cruises period

History

United Kingdom
- Name: MV Dartmouth Castle (1948)
- Owner: River Dart Steamboat Co (1948); Millbrook Steamboat & Trading Company (1975); Dart Pleasure Craft (1976); Devon Princess Cruises (1997); Dartmouth Steam Railway (19zz)
- Route: Dartmouth - Totnes
- Builder: Philip and Son, Dartmouth
- Cost: £11,331
- Laid down: 1947
- Launched: 1948
- Refit: 1975, 2008
- Homeport: Dartmouth
- Fate: Taken out of Service in 2023
- Status: No longer in service

General characteristics
- Type: Twin-screw motor vessel
- Tonnage: 81 GRT
- Length: 86.95 ft (26.50 m) LOA
- Beam: 20 ft (6.1 m)
- Draught: 5.3 ft (1.6 m)
- Decks: 3
- Propulsion: Twin Gardner diesels
- Capacity: 300 passengers
- Crew: 3-5

MV Dartmouth Castle is a passenger ship operating on the River Dart for the Dartmouth Steam Railway and River Boat Company. She is listed on the National Register of Historic Ships.

== Design ==
=== Original design ===
MV Dartmouth Castle was built to a classic motor passenger vessel design, with open decks forward and aft of a lower deck saloon, and an open promenade deck above, with the wheelhouse at its forward end. This wheelhouse was considerably older than the ship, having been originally fitted to the previous Dartmouth Castle, a 1907 vintage paddle steamer. The promenade deck also featured a number of very tall ventilators, a canopy above, and a rather ugly landing deck - a raised deck allowing passengers to board from a high quayside at low tide.

=== Millbrook conversion ===
MV Dartmouth Castle's appearance was completely changed in the late 1970s when, in common with many similar vessels, her promenade deck was covered over. While many of these conversions resulted in rather ungainly looking vessels, MV Dartmouth Castle was, if anything, improved. The new deckhouse covers around two-thirds of the former promenade deck, is open at its aft end, and has an open passenger deck, along with a new wheelhouse above. She has also gained a small funnel behind the wheelhouse. The new arrangement emphasises the terraced arrangement of the aft decks. The bar and toilets remain in the lower saloon.

== History ==
=== River Dart Steamboat Company service ===
The MV Dartmouth Castle was originally ordered by the River Dart Steamboat Co to replace a former paddle steamer of the same name, which had been laid up for the whole of World War II and was deemed to be beyond economic repair. She was built for service on the River Dart, running on services between Dartmouth and Totnes, as well as on circular cruises from Dartmouth. She was the first of four post-war steel-hulled motor vessels that eventually replaced the company's paddle steamers. The pleasure boat operations declined during the late 1960s and early 1970s, and after the 1974 season the fleet was laid up for sale, with the MV Dartmouth Castle having a book value of just £685.

=== Millbrook and Dart Pleasure Craft service ===
The Millbrook Steamboat & Trading Company purchased MV Dartmouth Castle in 1975 and transferred her to its Plymouth based fleet, where she was by far the largest vessel. However, just two seasons later, she was replaced by the larger MV Cardiff Castle, also purchased from the River Dart Steamboat Company, and was sold to Dart Pleasure Craft Ltd, returning to her old services on the River Dart, under the "River Link" brand. In 1980, the owners of Dart Pleasure Craft purchased the Millbrook company, and for the next few years there were numerous transfers of vessels between the two operators, until the Millbrook operation was closed in 1985. MV Dartmouth Castle remained in service on the Dart, principally on the Dartmouth-Totnes run, but also operating most of the coastal cruises from Dartmouth. In 2002, she was replaced by the MV Plymouth Venturer, a very similar sized and similar looking vessel acquired from Plymouth Boat Cruises, renamed MV Dart Venturer, and was laid up.

=== Recent service ===
She was sold to Devon Princess Cruises, and received a thorough refit, but was little used. In 2010, Dart Pleaure Craft was merged with the Paignton and Dartmouth Steam Railway, under the name Dartmouth Steam Railway and River Boat Company. The company began operating a new boat service from Torquay to Dartmouth, as part of a circular "Sea Train" service in connection with its trains, and earmarked the MV Dart Venturer to operate this trip. The MV Dartmouth Castle therefore returned to the Dart, and once again took up operations on the Dartmouth-Totnes route.
