= Isle of Man Sea Terminal =

Ferry terminal on the Isle Of Man

Coordinates: 54.148°N 4.474°W

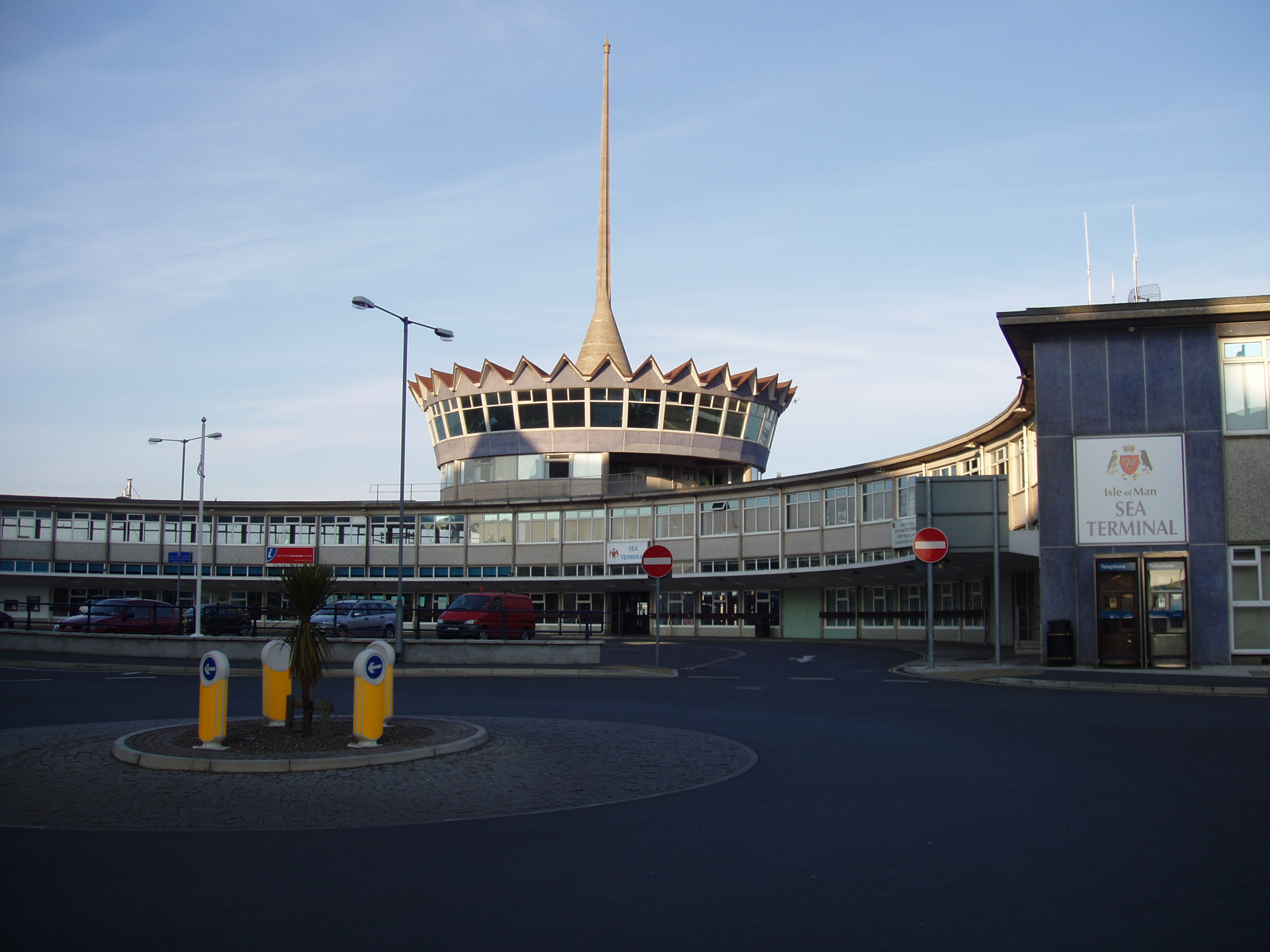
Sea Terminal front façade

The Isle of Man Sea Terminal (Manx: Boayl Troailtee Varrey Vannin) is the arrival and departure point for all passenger and car ferries operating to and from the Isle of Man, and is located in Douglas, the island's capital. It is one of the two main gateways to the Isle of Man, the other one being the Isle of Man Airport. It is operated by and is the main hub for the Isle of Man Steam Packet Company, which runs year-round sailings to Heysham, and seasonal sailings to Liverpool, Belfast and Dublin in the summer and Birkenhead at weekends in the winter.

The Sea Terminal is located on the near side of Douglas Harbour, closer to the promenade. It also houses the Isle of Man Welcome Centre, which is the main visitor centre for the island, a theatre box office, and the Department of Infrastructure's Licensing Office. The Douglas Harbour Control Unit is also located on the upper level of the Sea Terminal.

== History ==
Before the mid-60s, ferry passengers to and from the Isle of Man would simply get on and off. No major security procedures were in place, and passengers would not need any specific identification: all they needed was a valid ticket.

The Isle of Man Sea Terminal was built in 1965 by McCormick and Davies, to accommodate rising passenger numbers, and also for security reasons. At that time, the Isle of Man was a major holiday destination, with thousands of holidaymakers flocking from Britain and Ireland during the summer months. Along with All Saints Church, Douglas, the Sea Terminal is one of the few Modernist buildings on the Isle of Man.

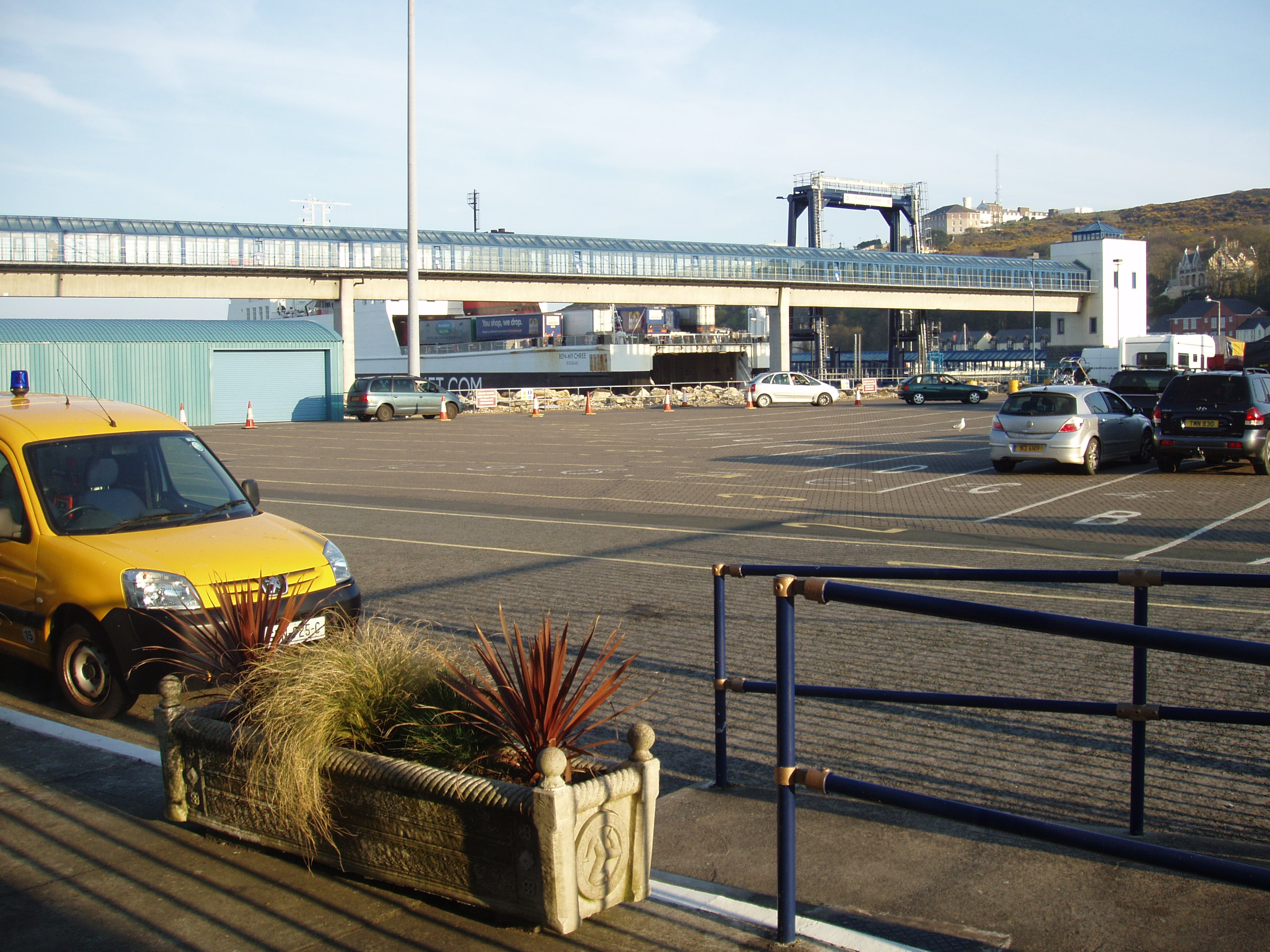
Car marshalling area and passenger footbridge

== Facilities ==
Only the ground floor space in the terminal building is used for passengers. Upstairs there are offices and the Douglas Harbour Control Unit.

In the main departure lounge, there is a Costa Coffee café, WHSmith store, a Steam Packet ferry travel shop, a play area for children, toilet facilities, foot passenger check in area and a model of the Laxey Wheel.

Outside the main departure lounge, there is the arrivals hall with baggage belt and the Isle of Man Welcome Centre.

At one point, there was a restaurant on the top floor called the Crow's Nest. This is now used as the harbour control unit. The restaurant was quite popular, as it gave views over the main harbour.

Next to the terminal is the vehicle check-in and marshalling area, where all vehicles must wait until the ship is ready for boarding.

The Sea Terminal was formerly used as a waiting point for passengers travelling on the Laxey Towing Company's Karina pleasure cruiser. It operated daily trips to Port Soderick, Laxey and other destinations from the cruise ship landing stage in the harbour next to the Victoria Pier.

== Connecting island transport ==
Lord Street, about 5 minutes walk from the Sea Terminal, is the terminus for bus routes provided by the island's government-owned bus operator, Bus Vannin, From here, buses serve most major destinations on the island, as well as destinations within Douglas. Douglas has no bus station now.

The Douglas Bay Horse Tramway operates in summer from the Sea Terminal along Douglas Promenade to Derby Castle, which is the Manx Electric Railway's southern terminus, enabling passengers to travel from the Sea Terminal to Ramsey.

The Isle of Man Railway operates from the nearby Douglas Station to Port Erin. The station is about a ten-minute walk from the Sea Terminal.

== Photo gallery ==
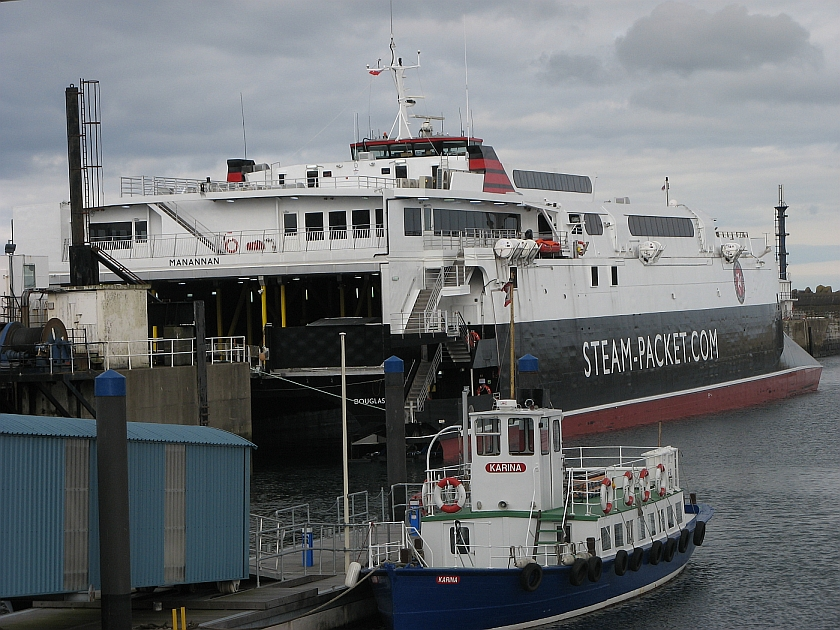
Manannan on the Victoria Pier with the Laxey Towing Company's Karina on the cruise ship landing stage in the foreground.

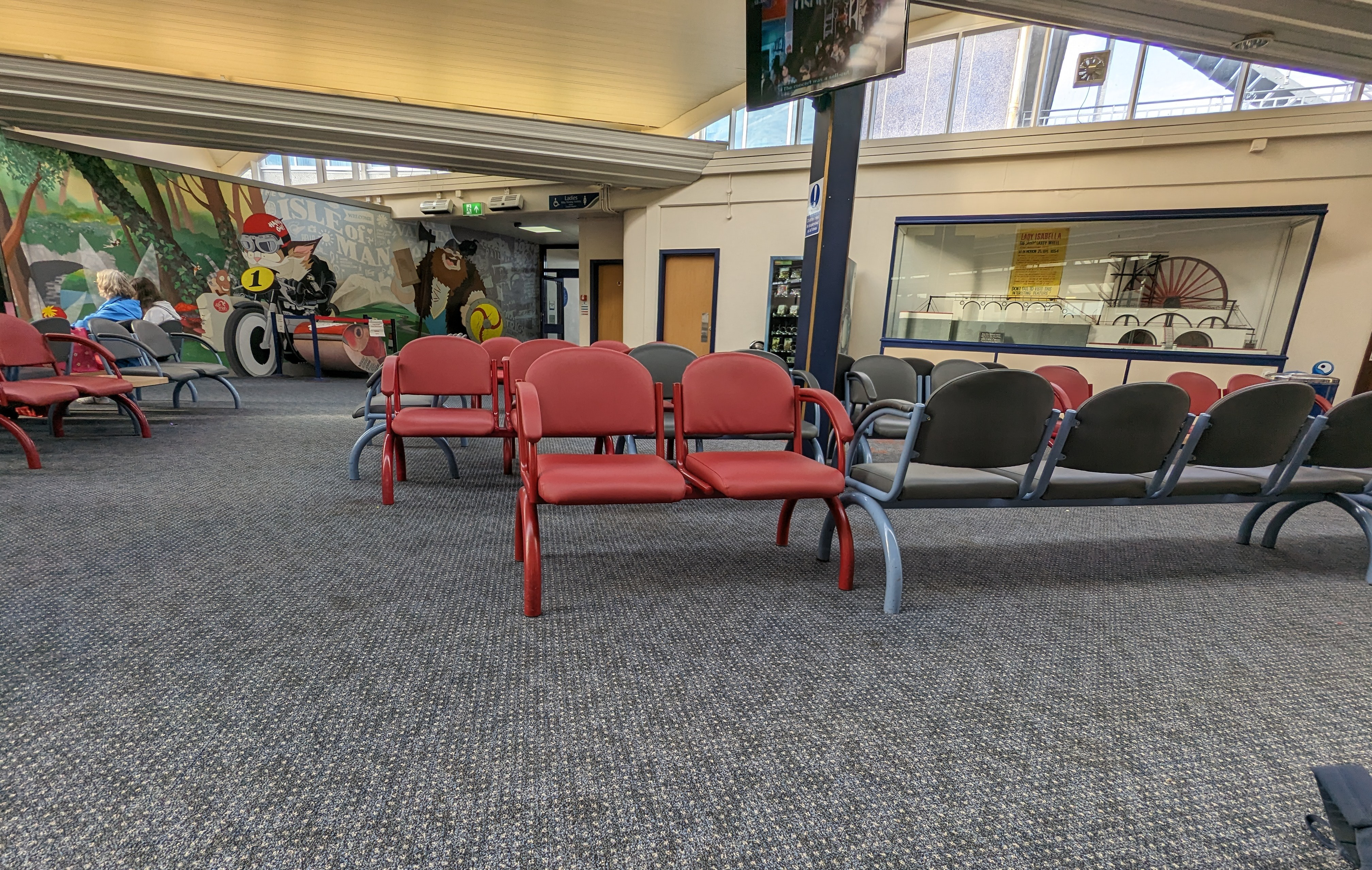
Terminal lobby

== See also ==
- Douglas Harbour
- Isle of Man Steam Packet Company
- Isle of Man Government
- Isle of Man Department of Transport
- Isle of Man Department of Tourism and Leisure
