= Plymouth Boat Cruises =

Excursion boat operator

The Plymouth Boat Cruises was an excursion boat operator on the River Tamar in South Devon. It was started in 1981, in competition with Millbrook Steamboat & Trading Co Ltd. In 1985 the Millbrook company withdrew from the Tamar, and several of its vessels were transferred to Plymouth Boat Cruises. In 2005 the company was taken over by Sound Cruising.

== Fleet List ==
Name	Built	Company service	Notes
MV Plymouth Princess	1921	1981–2005	
MV Plymouth Venturer	1982	1982–2003	
MV Southern Belle	1925	1985–2000	
MV My Queen	1929	1985–1987	
MV Eastern Belle	1946	1985–1985	
MV Totnes Castle	1949	1985–2005	
MV Plymouth Belle	1961	2003–2005	

== The 1985 reshuffle ==
In 1985 Dart Pleasure Craft, owners of the Millbrook Steamboat & Trading Co Ltd, decided to withdraw from the River Tamar, mainly due to competition with Plymouth Boat Cruises. The Cremyll Ferry was taken over by a new operator, Tamar Cruising / Cremyll Ferry. Some vessels were eventually sold to G.H. Riddalls and Sons. In the process of all of these changes the fleets of all five companies underwent many changes, which are listed below.

Name	Pre-1985 operator	Post-1985 operator	1987 situation	Notes
MV Plymouth Princess	Plymouth Boat Cruises	Plymouth Boat Cruises	Plymouth Boat Cruises	
MV Plymouth Venturer	Plymouth Boat Cruises	Plymouth Boat Cruises	Plymouth Boat Cruises	
MV Totnes Castle	Dart Pleasure Craft	Plymouth Boat Cruises	Plymouth Boat Cruises	
MV My Queen	Dart Pleasure Craft	Plymouth Boat Cruises	GH Riddalls	
MV Queen Boadicea II	Dart Pleasure Craft	Tamar Cruising	Tamar Cruising	
MV Adrian Gilbert	Dart Pleasure Craft	Dart Pleasure Craft	Dart Pleasure Craft	
MV Dartmouth Castle	Dart Pleasure Craft	Dart Pleasure Craft	Dart Pleasure Craft	Spent some time operating for Millbrook Steamboat & Trading Co.
MV Western Belle	Millbrook Steamboat	Dart Pleasure Craft	Dart Pleasure Craft	Operating on the Dart since 1984
MV Cardiff Castle	Millbrook Steamboat	Dart Pleasure Craft	Dart Pleasure Craft	
MV Edgecumbe Belle	Millbrook Steamboat	Dart Pleasure Craft	Dart Pleasure Craft	
MV Plymouth Belle	Millbrook Steamboat	Dart Pleasure Craft	Dart Pleasure Craft	
MV Eastern Belle	Millbrook Steamboat	Plymouth Boat Cruises	GH Riddalls	Operating on the Dart from 1984. Renamed Totnes Princess by Riddalls.
MV Southern Belle	Millbrook Steamboat	Plymouth Boat Cruises	Plymouth Boat Cruises	
MV Northern Belle	Millbrook Steamboat	Tamar Cruising	Tamar Cruising	
MV Plymouth Sound			Tamar Cruising	Built 1987
MV Queen of Helford	GH Riddalls	GH Riddalls	GH Riddalls	
MV Dartmothian	GH Riddalls	GH Riddalls	GH Riddalls	
