= MV Plymouth Belle =

History

United Kingdom
- Name: MV Plymouth Belle
- Namesake: Plymouth City
- Owner: Millbrook Steamboat & Trading Co Ltd (1961); Dart Pleasure Craft Ltd(1985); Plymouth Boat Cruises(2002); Sound Cruising (2005)
- Route: Plymouth-Cawsand (1961); River Dart (1985); Plymouth (2002)
- Builder: Mashfords, Cremyll, Cornwall
- Launched: 1961
- Identification: MMSI number: 235006882
- Status: Operating on circular cruises from Plymouth

General characteristics
- Type: Single-screw motor vessel
- Length: 65 ft (20 m) LOA
- Decks: 2
- Propulsion: Diesel
- Capacity: 116 passengers

The MV Plymouth Belle is a single screw passenger vessel, operating from Plymouth, Devon on Dockyard and Warships cruises from the new town pier, adjacent to Mayflower Steps.

== History ==
The ship was built in 1961 by Mashfords of Cremyll in Cornwall for Millbrook Steamboat & Trading Co Ltd. SHe was originally used on the Plymouth - Cawsand ferry service. Originally she only had a single deck, with a covered cabin, but her capacity was later increased by the addition of a top deck. In 1985 The Millbrook company, by this point owned by Dart Pleasure Craft Ltd of Dartmouth, abandoned its services in Plymouth, mainly due to competition with Plymouth Boat Cruises, and the MV Plymouth Belle was transferred to the River Dart. She operated on all of the 'River Link' services of Dart Pleasure craft, including Dartmouth-Totnes, the Dartmouth-Kingswear Ferry and circular cruises from Dartmouth.

In 2000 Dart Pleasure Craft took over G.H. Riddalls and Sons, their main competitor on River Dart services. With the increase in size of the fleet, the MV Plymouth Belle was surplus to requirements and laid up. In 2002 she was sold to Plymouth Boat Cruises, in exchange for the larger MV Plymouth Venturer. She began operating on Dockyard and Warship cruises from Phoenix Wharf in Plymouth. In 2005, Plymouth Boat Cruises was taken over by Sound Cruising, in a near repeat of the demise of the Millbrook company twenty years earlier. MV Plymouth Belle continued on her cruises.
