= Dart Explorer =

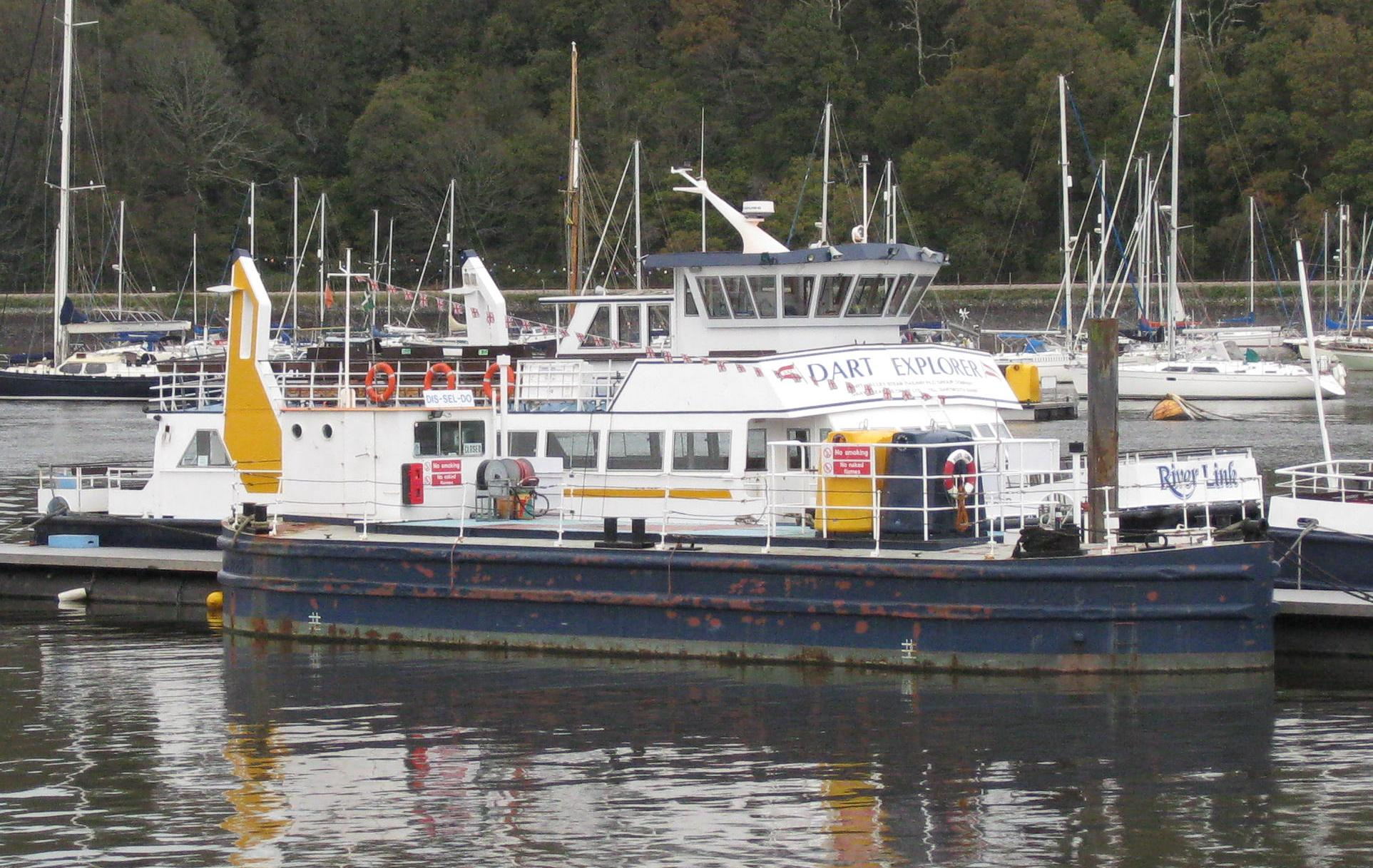
- MV Dart Explorer on the overnight pontoon at Dartmouth

History

United Kingdom
- Name: MV Devonair Belle (1991); MV Dart Explorer (2001)
- Owner: River Link
- Route: River Dart
- Launched: 1991
- Identification: IMO number: 8966157
- Status: Operating on the River Dart between Dartmouth and Totnes

General characteristics
- Type: Twin-screw catamaran
- Tonnage: 150 GRT
- Length: 85 ft (26 m) LOA
- Decks: 2
- Propulsion: Twin diesels
- Capacity: 301 passengers

Dart Explorer, formerly Devonair Belle, is a twin-screw passenger catamaran, operating on the River Dart in South Devon, England, mainly on the circular harbour cruise route from Dartmouth, for River Link.

== Design ==
Dart Explorer is a steel-hulled catamaran. There is no passenger accommodation in the hulls. The main deck, immediately above the hulls, has open passenger decks forward and aft of a large, fully enclosed and heated saloon. The upper deck, accessed by a stairway from the aft open deck, contains the wheelhouse forward, which is attached to a small passenger shelter. The remainder of the upper deck is open passenger space, and there are two slim funnels towards the stern. The saloon has fixed booth seating along each side, with a dance floor with removable chairs and tables in the center. At the aft end of the saloon are a bar and toilets. Unlike many passenger catamarans, Dart Explorer is not a high-speed craft, instead using her wide beam for improved passenger facilities.

== History ==
Devonair Belle was built in 1991 for River Link. She was the first vessel built for the company, and was the first large passenger vessel to enter service on the Dart since the Cardiff Castle, which entered service in 1964. In 2001 she was renamed Dart Explorer. She is chiefly used on River Link's circular harbour cruises from Dartmouth, although she also runs on the Dartmouth to Totnes route. As Dart Explorer is the most luxurious vessel in the fleet, she also runs most of the evening, disco and party cruises, and is the main charter vessel for the company.
