= MV Plymouth Venturer =

History

United Kingdom
- Name: Plymouth Venturer; Dart Venturer
- Owner: Plymouth Boat Cruises (1982); Dart Pleasure Craft Ltd (2002)
- Route: Plymouth (1982); River Dart (2002)
- Builder: Mashfords, Plymouth, UK
- Launched: 1982
- Status: Operating on the River Dart between Dartmouth and Totnes

General characteristics
- Type: Twin-screw motor vessel
- Tonnage: 94 GRT
- Length: 83 ft (25 m) LOA
- Decks: 3
- Propulsion: Twin 170 hp (130 kW) diesels
- Speed: 11 knots (20 km/h; 13 mph)
- Capacity: 300 passengers

MV Dart Venturer is a twin screw passenger vessel, operating on the River Dart in South Devon, United Kingdom, on the cruise / ferry route between Dartmouth and Totnes, and on circular coastal and river cruises from Dartmouth, for Dart Pleasure Craft Ltd.

== History ==
Plymouth Venturer was built in 1982 for Plymouth Boat Cruises by V. Visick and Sons of Perranwell, Cornwall. She was built to compete with the Millbrook Steamboat & Trading Co Ltd, and in design closely resembled Cardiff Castle of that fleet, having an open upper deck, main deck with large wheelhouse, and a lower deck with a bar. She joined Plymouth Princess in the Plymouth Boat Cruises fleet. The competition was too great for the Millbrook Company, who withdrew from the district in 1985. In 2002 she was 'exchanged' with the rather smaller Plymouth Belle of Dart Pleasure Craft Ltd, was renamed Dart Venturer and took up service on the River Dart.

As of 2020, Dart Venturer primarily works the Western Lady Ferry between Torquay and Brixham.
