= Light Vessel 18 =

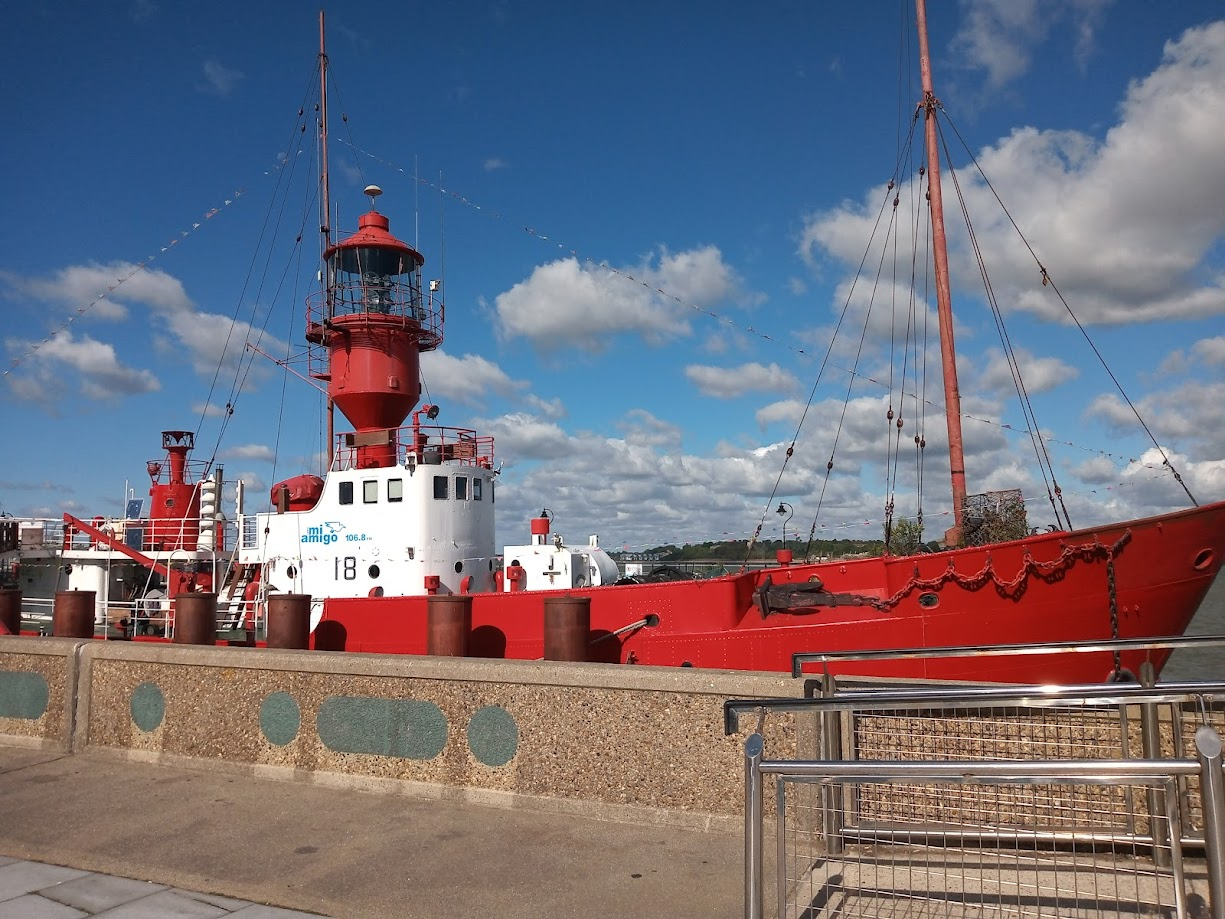
- Lightvessel No. 18 "LV18" at Harwich in 2022

History
- Name: Light Vessel No. 18 (1958–present)
- Owner: Trinity House (1958–1997) Sea Containers (1997–2002) The Pharos Trust (2002–present)
- Builder: Philip and Son, Dartmouth
- Completed: 1958
- Out of service: 1994
- Fate: Preserved at Harwich, 2002
- Status: Preserved as a floating museum in Harwich

General characteristics

Light Vessel 18 Saint Gowan, otherwise known as LV18 is an ex-Trinity House lightship and is the only Trinity House lightship equipped with a majority of its original equipment. Built in 1958 as one of a class of 8 lightships by Philip and Son, the ship was initially posted to the Saint Gowan station and subsequently served at several other stations before retirement in 1994. In 1997 the vessel was sold to Sea Containers Ltd and two years later was chartered to Tony O'Neil for preservation purposes. In this new position she began to serve as a location for various revival broadcasts of offshore radio. In 2002, The Pharos Trust was established for the purposes of the preservation and upkeep of LV18 and the vessel was subsequently purchased by the trust. In February 2024 an arson attack occurred aboard the vessel and serious damage was incurred to the ship.
