= Solway Harvester =

British scallop dredger

Coordinates: 54°05′51″N 4°09′52″W

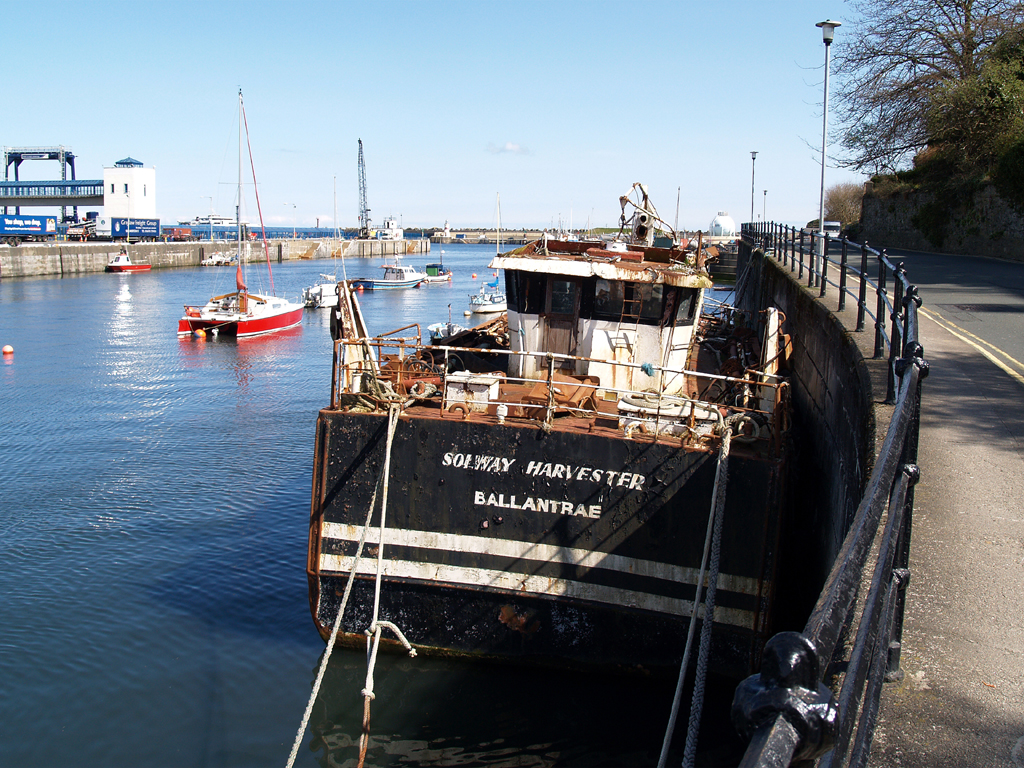
- Solway Harvester in Douglas, Isle of Man, in April 2010

History

United Kingdom
- Name: Solway Harvester
- Builder: Hepworth shipyard, Paull, Yorkshire.
- Launched: 1992
- In service: 1992–2000
- Identification: IMO number: 8952974
- Fate: Sunk on 11 January 2000, raised and scrapped

General characteristics
- Class & type: Scallop dredger
- Length: 70 ft (21 m)
- Crew: 7

Solway Harvester was a scallop dredger from Kirkcudbright, Scotland, which sank off the coast of Douglas, Isle of Man, in heavy seas on 11 January 2000 with the loss of all seven crew members. Following salvage, the damaged ship was taken to Douglas, where she remained until dismantled for scrap in January 2014.

== Career and sinking ==
The Solway Harvester was launched in 1992. An automated scallop dredger, she was fitted with sections along the sides which would rotate out and upwards to deposit the catch on the deck. She was 70 ft (21m) long and had accommodation for eight on board, plus a workshop, ice machine and storage for the catch. She was owned by Richard Gidney and operated under the command of her skipper, Andrew (Craig) Mills. Her crew were all from the Isle of Whithorn in Wigtownshire in Dumfries and Galloway.

On her final voyage, the Solway Harvester sailed from Kirkcudbright in the early hours of 10 January 2000. She headed into the Irish Sea to harvest scallops from the queen scallop grounds. There were seven crew members aboard, including an 18 year old and two 17 year olds. They remained off the grounds until the afternoon of the following day, 11 January. Having collected 150 bags of scallops, they hauled in their gear and began the return voyage. The weather meanwhile had begun to worsen, and skipper Craig Mills decided to seek shelter in Ramsey Bay, Isle of Man. Mills made a final phone call at 17:29.

Nothing further was heard until 17:47, when a satellite picked up an emergency position radio beacon. A search and rescue mission was quickly organised, with lifeboats from Workington, Barrow, Douglas and Ramsey and Port St Mary being launched. Helicopters flew out from RAF Prestwick and RAF Valley and a helicopter from the Irish Air Corps and a fixed wing aircraft from the Royal Ulster Constabulary joined in the search. Larger vessels also joined the search, with RFA Bayleaf and the Ben-my-Chree, the Isle of Man ferry moving into the area to help. The search was called off at dusk on 12 January, when two unopened liferafts were found. The Royal Navy was called in to assist and the Sandown class minehunter HMS Sandown began to search the sea bed. Sandown eventually located the wreck of the Solway Harvester on 15 January lying in 115 feet (35 m) of water, 11 miles (18 km) off the Isle of Man. The bodies of all seven crew members were found on board.

== Cause of sinking ==
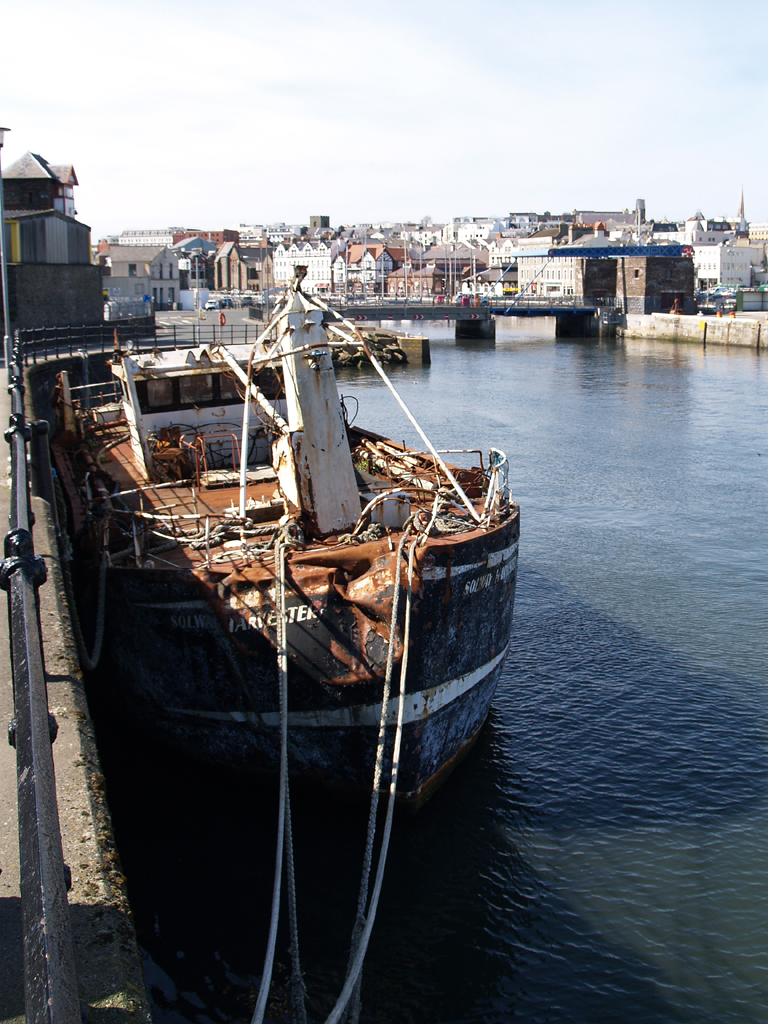
Solway Harvester in Douglas, Isle of Man, 19 April 2010

The Marine Accident Investigation Branch launched an inquiry to determine the cause of sinking. In a report published in 2003, they concluded that the Solway Harvester’s fish room had flooded, making her unstable and eventually causing her to capsize. The report found that there were critical maintenance issues, including a flood alarm that did not work and a missing hatch cover. Water had drained unnoticed into the fish room through the deck scuttles, which had not been covered. The pump was blocked and the broken bilge alarm meant that the flooding went unnoticed by the crew.

As the weather worsened to a Force 9 Gale, the Solway Harvester began to roll. Already unstable, she was eventually rolling at an angle of between 30 and 40 degrees. More water entered through the open deck scuttles, whilst the cargo shifted to starboard. Water became trapped on the main deck and continued to flood the fish room. The design of the Solway Harvester should have allowed her to return to rolling at 20 to 25 degrees, but the flooding had caused her to lose this stability. She continued to roll further and further on to her side, eventually capsizing suddenly.

The Solway Harvester was salvaged and raised in a £1 million operation funded by the government of the Isle of Man. Relatives of the victims later accused the Scottish Parliament of not doing enough to support the salvage operation.

The boat sat in the harbour in Douglas, Isle of Man, available as evidence during the inquest into the fatalities. A memorial was erected on Douglas Head on the Isle of Man, in memory of those lost.

On 8 November 2008, Coroner Michael Moyle ruled the deaths of all seven crew members as accidental. Parts of his report were heavily critical of Solway Harvester owner Richard Gidney over the ship's standard of maintenance and equipment, as well as her past safety record.

== Media interest ==
In addition to news items, the Solway Harvester has featured in the BBC documentary series Coast (series 5, episode 1, first broadcast in the UK on 25 July 2010). The role of Reverend Alex Currie, who became the spokesperson for the bereaved families, was featured in a BBC Radio 4 documentary "A Life Less Ordinary", first broadcast on 13 October 2012.

== Disposal ==
Following the subsequent raising of the Solway Harvester, the vessel lay tied up at Douglas Harbour during a protracted and laborious legal wrangle. Finally in November 2013 work began on scrapping the vessel, with the work undertaken by the Laxey Towing Company. A somewhat fraught operation followed, however work was completed in January 2014, 14 years after the vessel foundered.
