= Dwyn Wen =

British schooner

Coordinates: 12.779999°S 45.264306°E

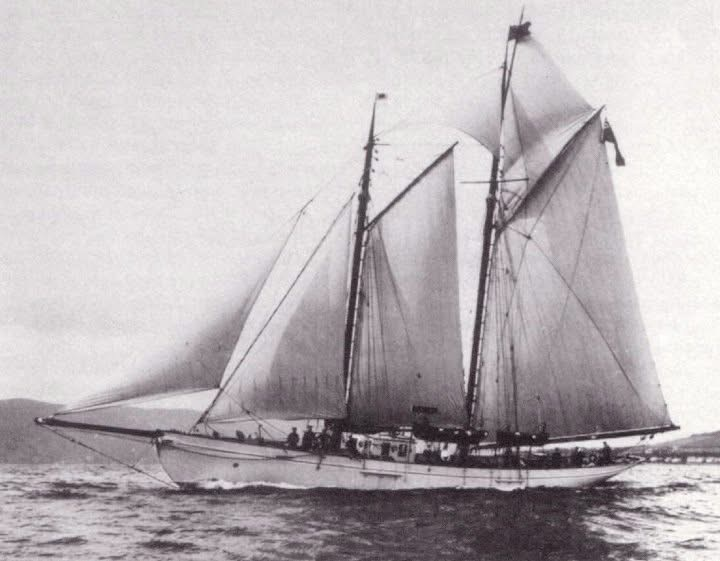
- Dwyn Wen, the year of her launch in 1906.

History

United Kingdom
- Name: Dwyn Wen
- Namesake: Saint Dwynwen
- Owner: James Hartley Burton (1906–1917); Lt Cmdr Henry W. A. Adams RN (1917–1920); Herbert W. Warden Sr. (1920–1921); Raphael E. Belilios (1921–1922); Dr. Robert Hale Ellis (1922–1925); Eugene Overton (c.1925–1942); US Navy (1942–1946); James K. Baird (1946–1947); H. Hanlon & J. Hanlon (1947–1951); William K. Pratt (1953–1954); Dwyn Wen Cruising Club Inc. (1954–1955); Ted C. Kistner (1955–1957; 1959–1960); Carlton Peterson (1957–1959); Byron J. Walters (1961–1969); Leonard H. Parsons (1972–1974); Travel Services (1974–1977); John R. Guthrie (1977–1984)
- Builder: Philip & Sons Ltd, Dartmouth
- Launched: 12 May 1906
- Completed: 1906
- Home port: Nosy Be, Madagascar
- Fate: Sank on 4 January 2014 off Dzaoudzi, Mayotte

General characteristics
- Type: Schooner
- Displacement: 170 tonnes
- Length: LOA: 39 m (128 ft); LOD: 32 m (106 ft)
- Beam: 6.10 m (20 ft 0 in)
- Draught: 3.81 m (12 ft 6 in)
- Propulsion: Single screw propeller

Dwyn Wen was a British built schooner active throughout the 20th century, before sinking near Dzaoudzi, Mayotte in 2014.

== History ==
The ship was built in 1906 for James Hartley Burton of Fryars (grandson of James Burton) by the Dartmouth shipyard of Philip & Son Ltd to the design of Alexander Richardson. The name "Dwyn Wen" is Celtic, derived from the patron saint of lovers in Wales. The vessel was a high-end schooner with a teak deck and two masts, boasting nearly 400 m^{2} (4,300 sq ft) of sail. It was designed for luxury yachting around England and was registered as a "Sailing Yacht." The interior featured fine walnut burl furniture and copper artwork.

On her maiden voyage, Burton sailed her to New Zealand and proceeded to travel the globe extensively over the next few years.

In 1924, the yacht was sold and left Weymouth for Hong Kong on 8 August, where it became a luxury cruise ship, sailing the Pacific during the Roaring Twenties.

During World War II, the yacht was requisitioned by the US Navy as an "auxiliary schooner" and was renamed USS Dwyn Wen (IX-58). It participated in several operations, including the capture of a Japanese submarine.

After the war, the schooner was returned to Eugène Overton and operated cruises between Hawaii and French Polynesia. It also took part in a scientific expedition in 1963, documented by the then-owner's wife, Marge Bradner.

By the late 1960s, the yacht passed into the hands of Dr. Robert Hale Ellis, who undertook a 42-day journey aboard the vessel.

In 1977, the ship was bought by John Guthrie, an adventurer and treasure hunter, who took it to the Western Indian Ocean (Zanj Sea). In 1985, the ship underwent several modifications. With Nosy Bé (in Madagascar) as its new home port, Guthrie and his family sailed throughout the Indian Ocean in search of sunken wrecks and treasures.

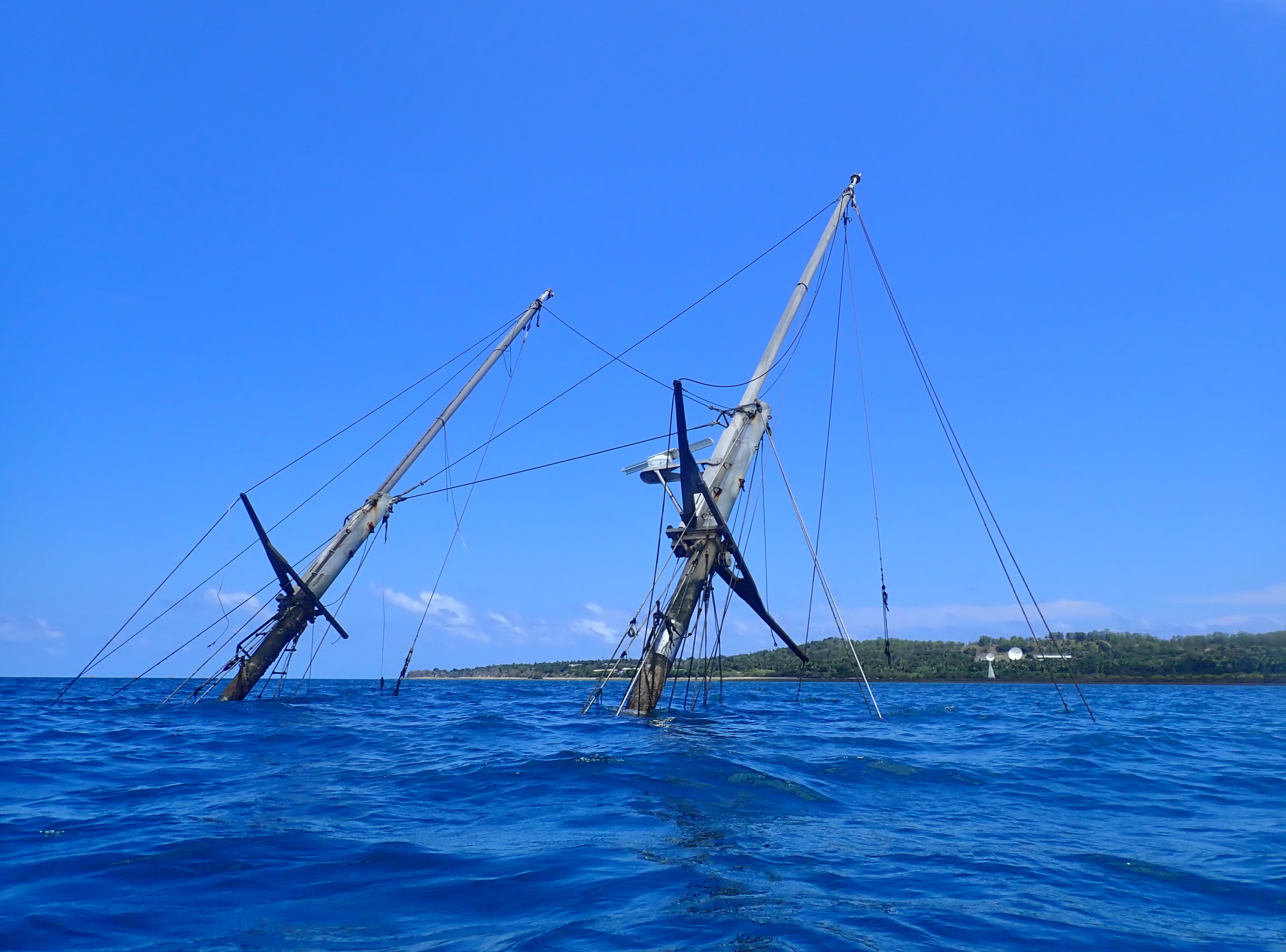
The wreck of Dwyn Wen at Mayotte, 2018

By the end of the 1990s, the vessel required repairs and was left abandoned, anchored off Mayotte, near the Badamiers sandbank. In 2004, the Dwyn Wen was heavily damaged during a storm. Ten years later, the elements had taken their toll, sinking the ship in January 2014, leaving only the two masts and part of the rigging above water.

== Legacy ==
The wreck has become a popular diving site for local divers in Mayotte, hosting a rich variety of marine life.

Wreck location off Dzaoudzi, Mayotte

== See also ==
- List of schooners
- Dwyn Wen (IX-58) on NavSource Online: Service Ship Photo Archive
