= Open top buses in Torbay =

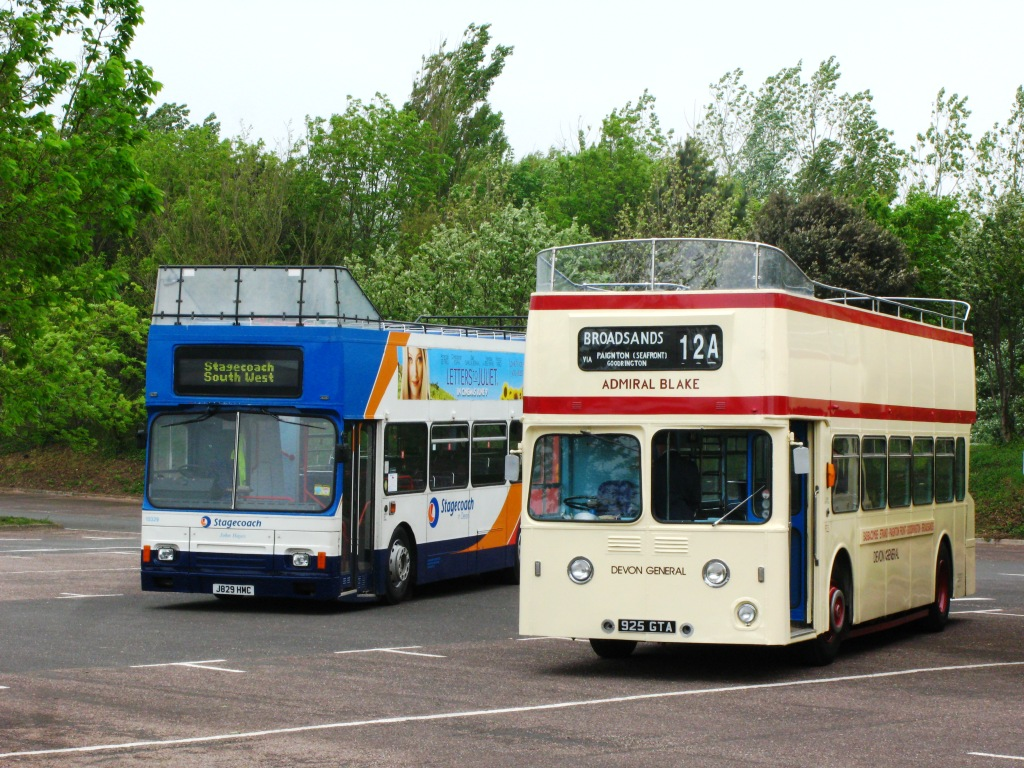
Two generations of open top bus in Torbay. Stagecoach Devon Scania 15329 John Hayes (left) and Devon General "Sea Dog" Atlantean 925 Admiral Blake.

Devon General first operated open top buses in Torbay in 1919 but reintroduced open top buses on tourist routes in 1955. New buses were introduced in 1961 which were known as 'Sea Dogs' because of the names they were given, but these were later replaced by those of 'Warships'.

== History ==
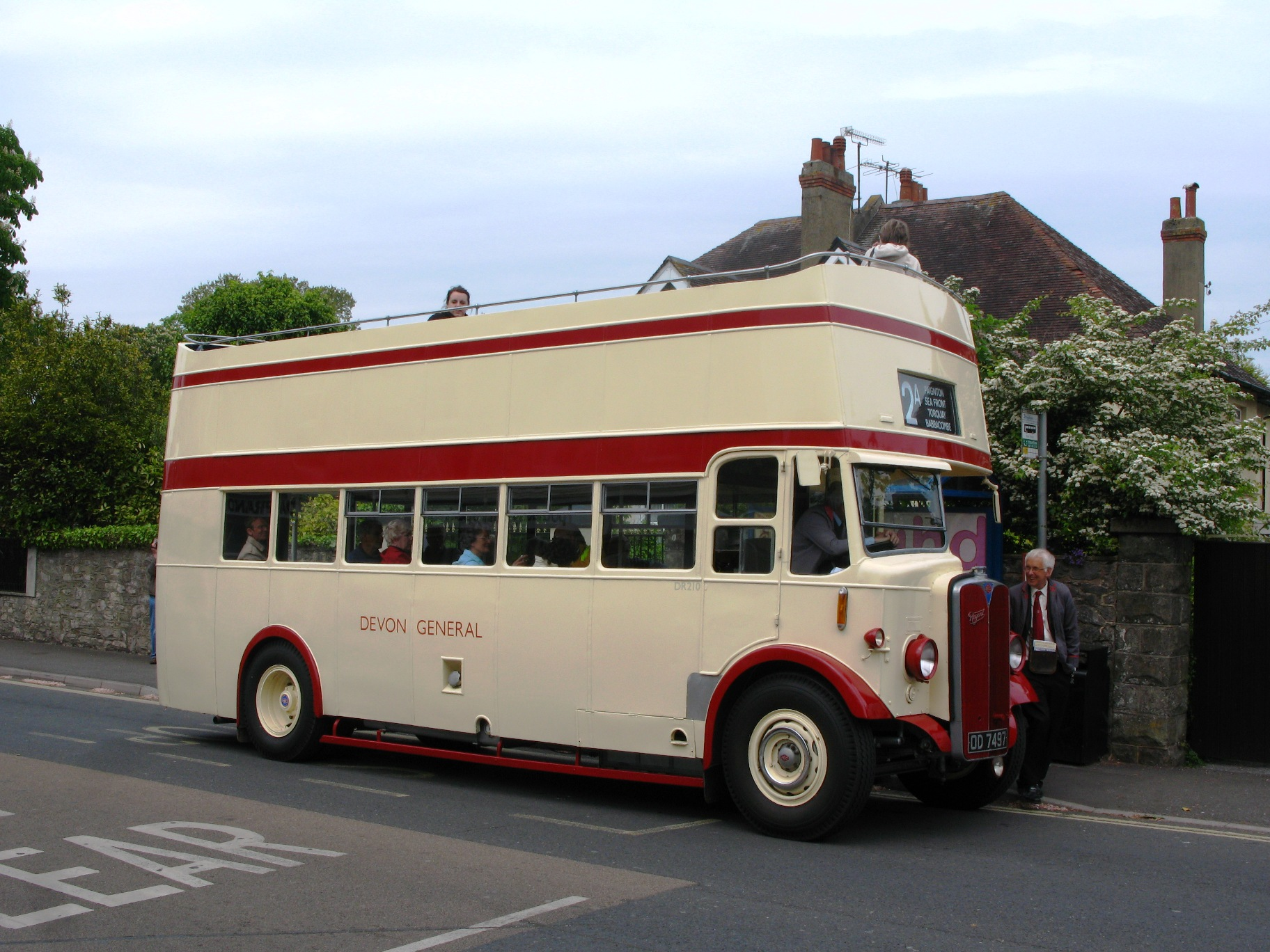
One of the buses converted in 1955

A service of open top trams was introduced by the Torquay Tramways in 1907 on a network around Torquay that included Beacon Quay, St Marychurch and Babbacombe. The following year saw an additional route along Torbay Road which terminated near Torquay railway station, then in 1911 it was extended to Paignton. The Devon General Omnibus and Touring Company started operations in south Devon in 1919 with two bus routes from Exeter to Torquay. These were operated with the usual open top buses of the era. In 1922 Torquay Tramways bought Devon General, although it was operated as a subsidiary and the motor buses already owned by the tramway company were transferred to the omnibus company. The tram network was closed in January 1934.

In the 1930s a few seaside resorts started to see open top buses operated as tourist attractions on their seaside roads. More resorts started such services in the years following World War II. In 1955 five old buses had their roofs removed for services in Torbay and one more was converted for Exmouth, another resort served by Devon General. They entered service on 19 June and a new sea front route was started on 19 July. These proved a success and so a larger fleet of new buses were delivered for service in 1961. They were launched at a naming ceremony on 11 May 1961. These were 'convertible' buses that could operated as open tops during the summer and with roofs during the remainder of the year, although after the first winter they were usually stored during the winter as putting the roofs on caused some damage. It took half an hour to fit or remove a roof using the mechanism that had worked a bus washing machine which had recently been superseded. When not in use the roofs were stored on three mobile racks made from old bus chassis from which the bodies had been removed.

Devon General was privatised in 1986 and became a part of Transit Holdings. This company preferred to operate minibuses and the open top fleet was reduced to just one vehicle. This was transferred to a new Bayline operation, which covered services in Torbay and Newton Abbot, in 1992.

Bayline was sold to the Stagecoach Group in 1996, and became part of the new Stagecoach in Devon operation in 2003. Stagecoach brought a revival of large buses instead of minibuses, and a larger fleet of open top buses was established.

== Routes ==
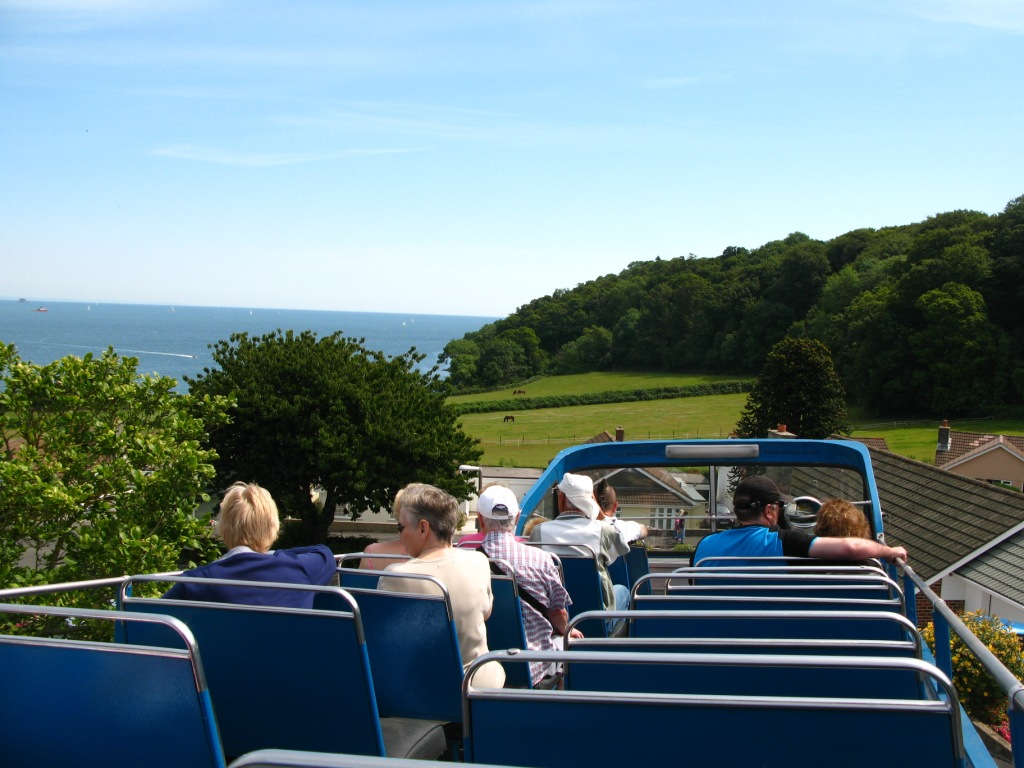
The view from the top of a bus at Broadsands

The first route to be introduced in 1955 was the 12A from St Marychurch through Babbacombe, Torquay, Paignton and Goodrington to Broadsands. To reach Paignton's sea front at Preston the bus had to pass under a very low railway bridge. A licence for the route was only granted on condition that buses would come to a stop before passing under the bridge, the conductor would then have to instruct passengers on the top deck to remain in their seats and then stand at the top of the stairs to see that they did.

From 1959 a second route was operated. The 12C followed the same route as the 12A from St Marychurch to Goodrington but then continued to Churston and Kingswear instead of turning down to the sea front at Broadsands.

The larger fleet of "Sea Dogs" available for the 1961 season allowed two further routes to be added. One was the 12B, which was already operating with conventional buses between Brixham and Kingswear. The second was a new 12D which followed the usual route from Babbacombe to Goodrington then continued through Churston to Brixham. Devon General routes were renumbered in 1975 which saw the sea front services numbered from 120, and additional buses allowed a Torquay to Dawlish Warren service to be offered the following year.

Today just two seasonal services are operated by different operators, with a third offering a scenic tour from Torquay.

Service	Route	Operator
122	Hoburne Devon Bay holiday park to Babbacombe	Stagecoach South West
Round Robin Tour	Paignton to Totnes	Dart Pleasure Craft
–	Sightseeing tour	English Riviera Sightseeing Tours

Seasonal open top services on route 122 operate from Hoburne Devon Bay holiday park to Babbacombe but closed top buses operate all year round from South Devon College through Paignton and St Marychurch to Dawlish Warren along a similar route to the 122.

== Vehicles ==
=== First buses ===
Devon General's first buses were AEC YC type with roofless double-deck bodies typical at the time. A second-hand AEC B-type was bought from the London General Omnibus Company in 1920 but was rebuilt after a few months. The Torquay Tramways purchased six AEC K-type double deck buses in 1921 which were transferred to the Devon General fleet the following year. Double deck buses delivered from 1929 were fitted with roofs and by 1932 the open top buses had been sold or rebuilt as single deck vehicles.

Fleet	Registration	Chassis	Name	In service	Operator
1	T 6942	AEC YC	Sir Francis Drake	1919– ca.1928	Devon General
2	T 6944	AEC YC	Sir Walter Raleigh	1919– ca.1927	Devon General
3	T 6946	AEC YC	Sir John Hawkins	1919–1926	Devon General
11	LF 8399	AEC B		1920–1921	Devon General
13	TA 1004	AEC K		1921–1926	Torquay Tramways
14	TA 1005	AEC K		1921–1926	Torquay Tramways
15	TA 1006	AEC K		1921–1926	Torquay Tramways
16	TA 1168	AEC K		1921–1926	Torquay Tramways
17	TA 1169	AEC K		1921–1926	Torquay Tramways
18	TA 1170	AEC K		1921–1926	Torquay Tramways
71	T 8328	AEC B		1926–1932	Devon General
72	T 6946	AEC YC		1926–1932	Devon General

=== Devon General ===
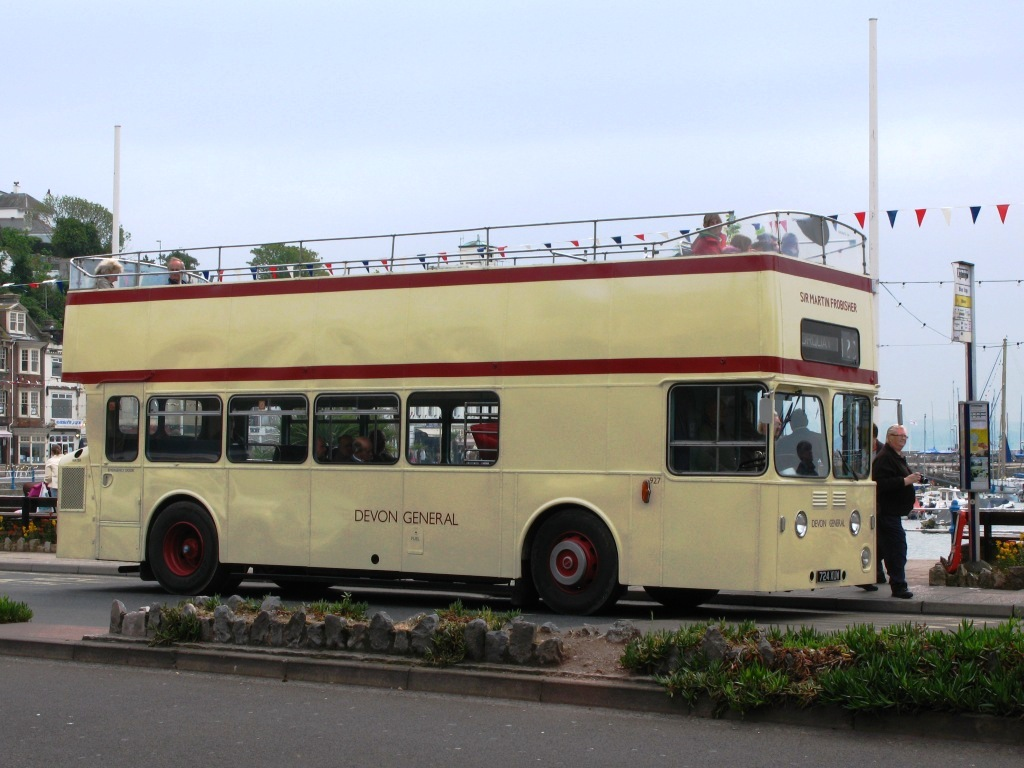
927 Sir Francis Drake

The six old buses rebuilt to open top form in 1955 were 21-year-old AEC Regent Is with bodies by Short Brothers. These were replaced by nine Leyland Atlanteans with convertible Weymann bodies in 1961. These were all given the names of historic sailors and known as "Sea Dogs". In 1976 two AEC Regent Vs with Willowbrook bodies had their roofs removed and were added to the open top fleet.

The Sea Dogs were replaced in 1978 by nine new Bristol VRTs with 74 seat Eastern Coach Works convertible bodies. Two of the VRTs were allocated to Southern National when Western National's Somerset and Dorset operations were divested in 1983 but five continued to operate at Torbay until the end of the 1990 season. After this a limited open top service was operated with just one bus.

Fleet	Registration	Chassis	Name	In service	Comments
203	OD 7490	AEC Regent		1955–1961	
205	OD 7492	AEC Regent		1955–1961	
210	OD 7497	AEC Regent		1955–1961	Operating for Nostalgic Travel in Newton Abbot.
218	OD 7505	AEC Regent		1955–1961	Initially based at Exmouth.
219	OD 7506	AEC Regent		1955–1961	
224	AUO 90	AEC Regent		1955–1961	
507	507 RUO	AEC Regent V	Prince Regent	1976–1978	Operating with Chepstow Classic Buses
508	508 RUO	AEC Regent V	Regency Princess	1976–1978	Preserved
925	925 GTA	Leyland Atlantean	Admiral Blake	1961–1977	To Western National Admiral Hardy in 1977 (see below).
926	926 GTA	Leyland Atlantean	Sir Francis Drake	1961–1975	To Western National (see below).
927	927 GTA	Leyland Atlantean	Sir Martin Frobisher	1961–1978	To Southern National as Admiral Hardy, now operating with by Chepstow Classic Buses.
928	928 GTA	Leyland Atlantean	Sir Humphrey Gilbert	1961–1983	
929	929 GTA	Leyland Atlantean	Sir Richard Grenville	1961–1983	
930	930 GTA	Leyland Atlantean	Sir John Hawkins	1961–1983	
931	931 GTA	Leyland Atlantean	Sir Thomas Howard	1961–1983	Previously Preserved by Rubicon Classic Travel, Bristol. Preserved by the Barrow Transport Museum Trust Limited since 2022.
932	932 GTA	Leyland Atlantean	Earl Howe	1961–1983	
933	933 GTA	Leyland Atlantean	Sir Walter Raleigh	1961–1982	
934	VDV 134S	Bristol VRT	Golden Hind	1978–1983	Became Southern National Thomas Hardy in 1983 now preserved near Bristol by North Somerset Coaches.
935	VDV 135S	Bristol VRT	Triumph	1978–2001	Renamed Exeter in 1987, now used by a catering company in Leicestershire.
936	VDV 136S	Bristol VRT	Revenge	1978–1991	Renamed Torbay in 1987, it is now used for cutting trees by East Yorkshire Motor Services.
937	VDV 137S	Bristol VRT	Victory	1978–1983	Transferred to Western National, now preserved by West Country Historic Omnibus and Transport Trust.
938	VDV 138S	Bristol VRT	Warspite	1978–1992	Renamed Illustrious in 1987, now in service with East Yorkshire Motor Services.
939	VDV 139S	Bristol VRT	Renown	1978–1992	Renamed Ark Royal in 1987. Sold to East Yorkshire Motor Services but exported to Italy in 2009.
940	VDV 140S	Bristol VRT	Invincible	1978–1992	Sold to East Yorkshire Motor Services but exported to Italy in 2009.
941	VDV 141S	Bristol VRT	Illustrious	1978–1983	Transferred to Western National, now preserved by Cornwall Bus Group.
942	VDV 142S	Bristol VRT	Hermes	1978–1983	Became Southern National Lawrence of Arabia in 1983, now operating with Chepstow Classic Buses.

=== Western National ===
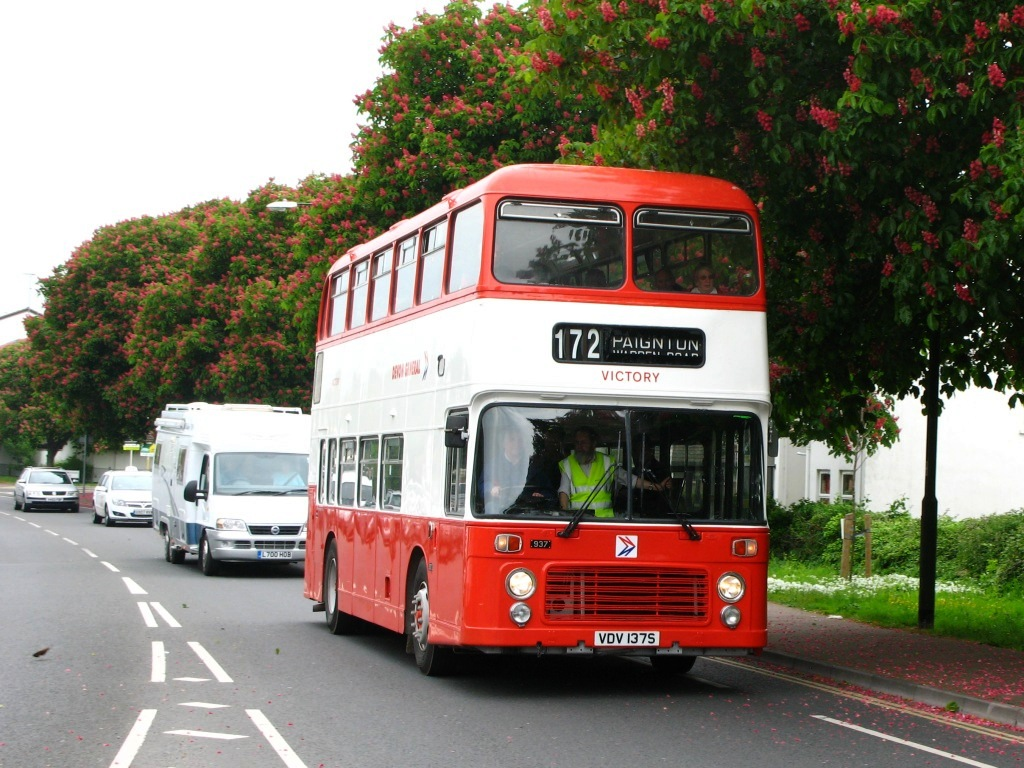
937 Victory (in winter configuration)

From 1971 Devon General became part of Western National but services around Torbay continued to operate in the old name and buses were sometimes moved between the fleets for short-term loans or on a more permanent basis. Two rare Bristol LDLs in the Western National fleet had their tops removed from 1972/3 for operation at Penzance and one of these was swapped in 1975 for Sir Francis Drake, and the other in 1977 for Admiral Blake. When the nine "Warship" VRTs were ordered for Devon General, two more were ordered for Western National. Both Atlanteans and VRTs also operated seasonal services at Weymouth. Western National's usual livery for open top buses was white and green, although Sir Francis Drake retained its red and white scheme.

Fleet	Registration	Chassis	Name	At Torquay	Comments
925	925 GTA	Leyland Atlantean	Admiral Blake		Now privately owned and used for leisure purposes around Torbay.
926	926 GTA	Leyland Atlantean	Sir Francis Drake		Preserved in Eastleigh.
1935	VDV 752	Bristol LDL	Admiral Boscawen	1975–1978	Now with Quantock Motor Services.
1936	VDV 753	Bristol LDL	Sir Humphry Davy	1977–1978	Now with Quantock Motor Services.
943	VDV 143S	Bristol VRT	Ark Royal		Sold to Badgerline in 1993, exported to Italy in 2010.
944	VDV 144S	Bristol VRT	Vanguard		Sold for scrap in 2001.

=== Stagecoach ===
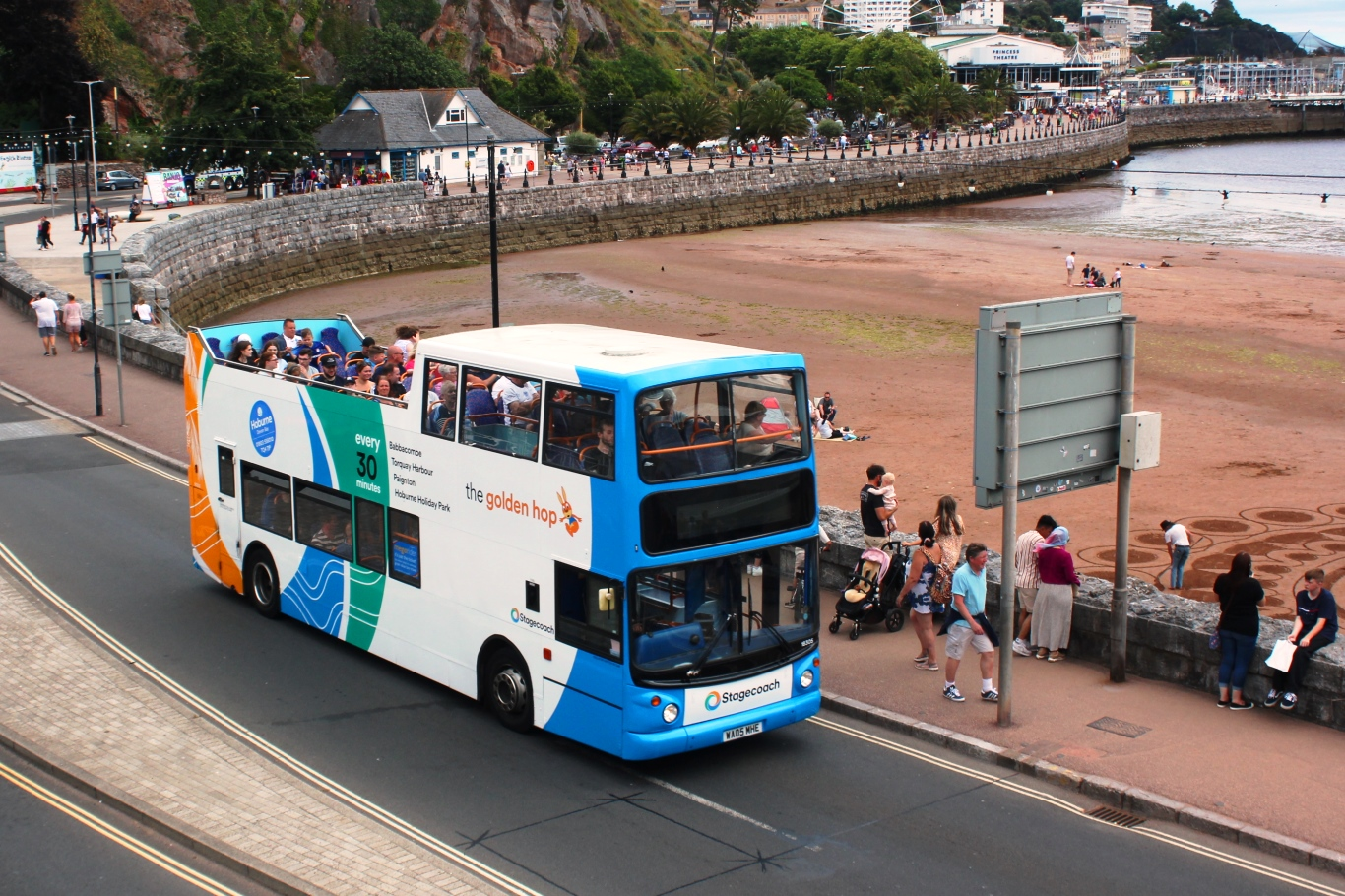
18305 (WA05 MHE), an Alexander ALX400, repainted for the 2022 season

By 1996, when Devon General was sold to the Stagecoach Group, the open top fleet at Torbay had been reduced to just one vehicle, but the new owners quickly boosted this by drafting in additional Bristol VRs from other parts of the group. The first two (936 and 937) came from Sussex Coastline in 1996 and three more (932 to 934) arrived in 1998 from Bluebird in Scotland but came without their roofs. A heritage vehicle, in the shape of Leyland Titan PD1 LRV 992 was also sent from Portsmouth to Torbay and was often used on scheduled services alongside the Bristol VRs.

Most of the Bristol VRs were withdrawn after the 1999 season, although 936 and 937 were sold to Dart Pleasure Craft to operate services in connection with their boats on the River Dart. Eight Scania N113s were then transferred from London. Their roofs were removed on arrival but five (numbers 15322 – 15326) were done in such a way as to be convertible back to roofed buses. and they generally operate in this form, open top services being in the main provided by 15327–15329. They are all named and, like the Leyland Atlanteans of 1961, are named after British sailors. The Scania's were withdrawn from use on 3 November 2013 (The closing day of Devon Cliffs holiday park), 15329 being the last in service. They were replaced by an Alexander ALX400-bodied Dennis Trident 2.

Fleet	Registration	Chassis	Body	Name	At Torbay	Comments
932	UWV 605S	Bristol VRT	Eastern Coach Works	–	1998–1999	Scrapped in 2000
933	UWV 608S	Bristol VRT	Eastern Coach Works	–	1998–1999	Exported to the United States in 2000
934	UWV 609S	Bristol VRT	Eastern Coach Works	–	1998–1999	Exported to Egypt in 2002
935	VDV 135S	Bristol VRT	Eastern Coach Works	Ark Royal	1977–2001	Used by a catering company in Leicestershire until 2016
936	UWV 604S	Bristol VRT	Eastern Coach Works	Illustrious	1996–2000	Operated by Dart Pleasure Craft until 2016
937	UWV 614S	Bristol VRT	Eastern Coach Works	Invincible	1996–2000	Operated by Dart Pleasure Craft until 2016; now preserved
15322	J822 HMC	Scania N113DRB	Alexander RH	Sir Alexander Cochrane	2000–2010	Now a mobile children's play centre in Glasgow as of 2014
15323	J823 HMC	Scania N113DRB	Alexander RH	Sir James Saumarez	2000–2010	Sold to City Sightseeing in Paphos, Cyprus
15324	J824 HMC	Scania N113DRB	Alexander RH	Sir John Borlase Warren	2000–2011	Scrapped in 2011
15325	J825 HMC	Scania N113DRB	Alexander RH	Sir Philip Bowes Vere Brook	2000–2011	Last operated with 2-Way Travel in Scunthorpe until 2020
15326	J826 HMC	Scania N113DRB	Alexander RH	Edward Pellow	2000–2010	Sold to Farm Bus of Staffordshire, then scrapped in 2017
15327	J827 HMC	Scania N113DRB	Alexander RH	Sir Home Popham	2000–2010	Scrapped in 2010
15328	J828 HMC	Scania N113DRB	Alexander RH	Sir Sidney Smith	2001–2012	Scrapped in 2014
15329	J829 HMC	Scania N113DRB	Alexander RH	John Hayes	2000–2013	Scrapped in 2014
15665	WA10 GHG	Scania N230UD	Alexander Dennis Enviro400	Laura Stephenson	2019–present	Formerly named Julie Emma. Transferred from Stagecoach Yorkshire after losing its roof in a crash in Sheffield
17701	ML02 RWO	Dennis Trident	Alexander ALX400	–	2014–2022	Transferred from Stagecoach Manchester; now preserved
18186	MX54 LPN	ADL Trident	Alexander ALX400	–	2016–2024, 2025-present	Formerly named Swash Buckle the Pirate Parrot. Transferred from Stagecoach Manchester; Spent a season on Stagecoach Yorkshire's Peak Sightseer service in 2024
18303	WA05 MGX	ADL Trident	Alexander ALX400	–	2017–2024	Formerly named Chirpy the Cricket, Now in use on Stagecoach Yorkshire's Peak Sightseer service
18304	WA05 MHJ	ADL Trident	Alexander ALX400	–	2017–2024	Formerly named Cango the Kangaroo, Now in use on Stagecoach Yorkshire's Peak Sightseer service
18305	WA05 MHE	ADL Trident	Alexander ALX400	–	2017–2024	Formerly named Porter the Penguin, Now in use on Stagecoach Yorkshire's Peak Sightseer service
18306	WA05 MHF	ADL Trident	Alexander ALX400	–	2016–2024	Formerly named Gary the Rabbit, Withdrawn in 2024 as a source of spare parts
18307	WA05 MGY	ADL Trident	Alexander ALX400	–	2017–2023	Formerly named Freddie the Frog, Scrapped in 2024
19571	WA59 FWT	ADL Enviro400	Alexander Dennis Enviro400	–	2018–present	
19658	WA60 FHP	ADL Enviro400	Alexander Dennis Enviro400	–	2025–present	Addition for the 2025 season, to cover vehicles sent to Stagecoach Yorkshire

=== Independent operators ===
Wallace Arnold kept an open top Leyland PD3 at Torquay for many years. It was used on local tours and shuttle services in connection with its longer distance operations. It even travelled to Lisbon on one occasion. Dart Pleasure Craft, trading as 'Rail River Link' started services in 2000 using Bristol VRTs (two of which were obtained from Stagecoach Devon). More recently Devonian Motor Services and English Riviera Tours have introduced a wider variety of bus types on new routes. One of Devon General's former "Sea Dogs" is in the Devonian fleet.

Operator	Fleet no.	Registration	Chassis	Name	Comments
Dart Pleasure Craft	1	UWV 614S	Bristol VRT	Frankie	New to Southdown Moor Services. Withdrawn 2016
Dart Pleasure Craft	2	UWV 604S	Bristol VRT		New to Southdown Motor Services. Withdrawn
Dart Pleasure Craft	3	WTU 467W	Bristol VRT		New to Crosville Motor Services. Withdrawn 2016
Dart Pleasure Craft	4	VDV 138S	Bristol VRT		Former Devon General bus, withdrawn 2016
Dart Pleasure Craft	10	Y812 TGH	Volvo B7TL		Open top from 2017
Dart Pleasure Craft	12	Y827 TGH	Volvo B7TL		Open top from 2017
Devonian Motor Services	925	MSJ 499	Leyland Atlantean	Admiral Blake	Former Devon General "Sea Dog"
Devonian Motor Services	934	GJZ 9571	Leyland Atlantean	Black Prince	
Devonian Motor Services	935	A146 OFR	Leyland Olympian	White Lady	
English Riviera Sightseeing Tours	–	BYX 304V	MCW Metrobus		Sold
English Riviera Sightseeing Tours	–	JTD 395P	Daimler Fleetline		Sold
English Riviera Sightseeing Tours	–	FFY 403	Leyland PD2/3		In service
Wallace Arnold	–	BUF 425C	Leyland PD3	Uncle Wally	No longer at Torbay

== See also ==
- Open top buses in the United Kingdom
  - Open top buses in Weston-super-Mare

== Sources ==
- Folkard, Leslie (2007). Devon General: a fascinating story. Devon General Society. ISBN 978-0-9555514-0-6.
