= MV Karina =

Former Isle of Man passenger vessel

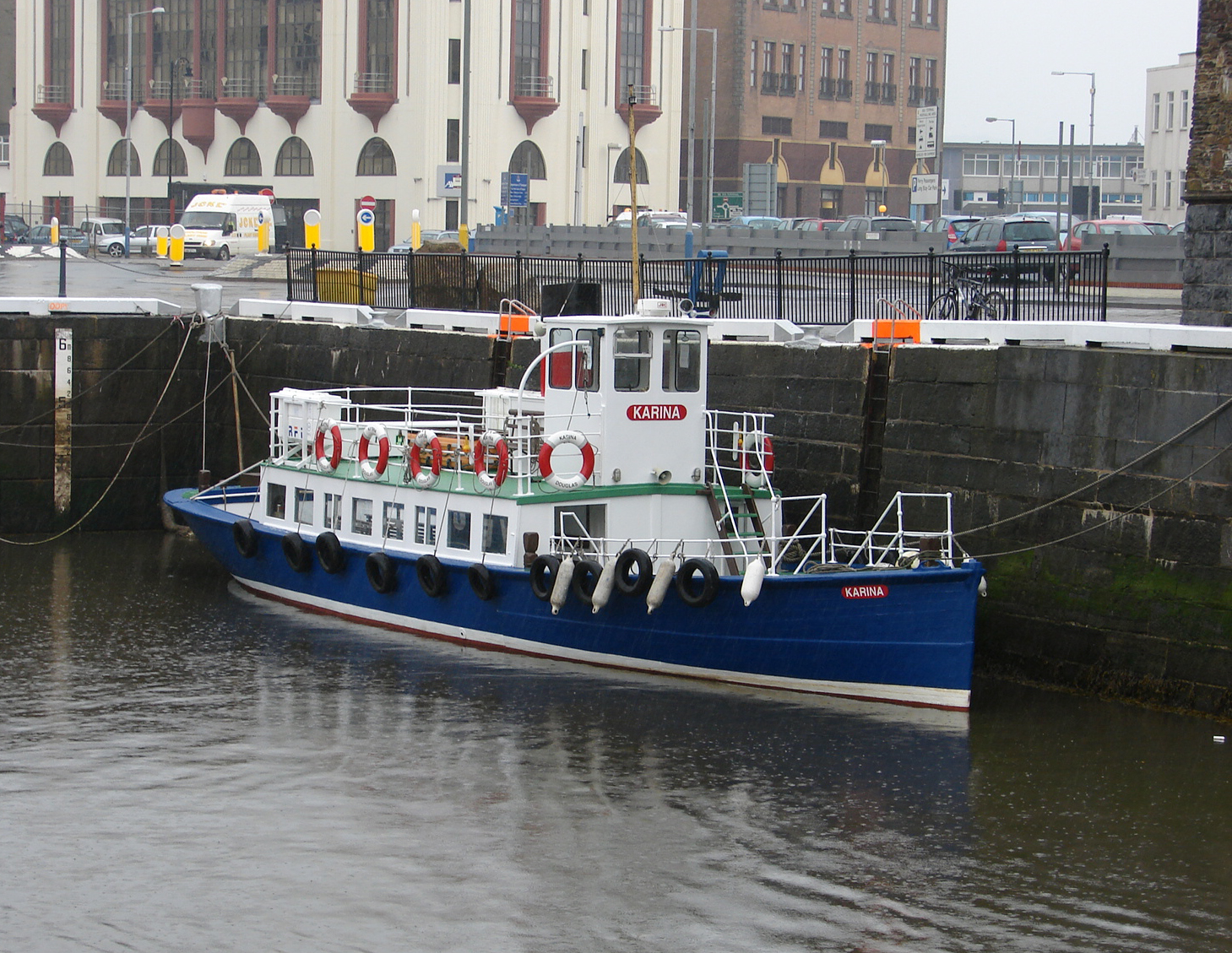
- MV Karina in Douglas Harbour

History

United Kingdom
- Name: May Queen; Eastern Belle; Totnes Princess; Karina
- Owner: Oreston & Turnchapel Steamboat Company (1946); Millbrook Steamboat & Trading Company (1957); Plymouth Boat Cruises (1985); GH Riddalls & Sons (1988); Dart Pleasure Craft (2000); Laxey Towing Company (2001)
- Route: Plymouth (1946); River Dart (1988); Isle of Man (2001)
- Builder: Philip and Son, Dartmouth, Devon
- Cost: £5,900
- Launched: 1946
- Sponsored by: Mrs C.C. Elford

General characteristics
- Type: Single-screw motor vessel
- Tonnage: 20
- Length: 66 ft (20 m) LOA
- Beam: 15 ft (4.6 m)
- Draught: 5.7 ft (1.7 m)
- Decks: 2
- Propulsion: Gardner
- Capacity: 100 passengers

MV Karina is a single screw passenger vessel, which formerly operated from Douglas, Isle of Man for the Laxey Towing Company. She operated on a selection of cruises along the Manx coast. She is registered on the National Register of Historic Vessels, certificate number 1893.

Built using carvel-construction with planking laid over oak frames, her dimensions are LOA 66 ft, breadth 14.9 ft, draft 5.7 ft, and freeboard 3 ft. The diesel engine is a Gardner, developing 127 bhp at 1,500 rpm, giving a service speed of 9 knots with more in reserve.

== History ==
She was built in 1946 by Philip and Son of Dartmouth, Devon, England, as the MV May Queen for the Oreston and Turnchapel Steamboat Co (OTSC). She was occasionally used on their ferry route from Plymouth to Oreston via Turnchapel, but mainly on cruises on the River Tamar. In 1957 the OTSC was wound up, and she was sold to the Millbrook Steamboat & Trading Company for £3,500, was renamed the MV Eastern Belle and was used on similar excursions, as well as a relief boat on the Cremyll Ferry. She remained with the Millbrook Company after she was taken over by Dart Pleasure Craft, though she was occasionally used on the River Dart services from Dartmouth. In 1985 Dart Pleasure Craft withdrew from the Plymouth area, and MV Eastern Belle was sold to Plymouth Boat Cruises, for whom she operated for the next three years.

In 1988 she was sold to GH Riddalls & Sons of Dartmouth, renamed MV Totnes Princess and painted in their 'Red Cruisers' colours of red hull and white superstructure. She operated on all of their River Dart services, including the Dartmouth to Totnes route and circular cruises from Dartmouth. in 2000 the Riddalls operation was bought by Dart Pleasure Craft, and MV Totnes Princess was laid up in Old Mill Creek, near Dartmouth. She remained in Red Cruisers colours, and did not operate for Dart Pleasure Craft. In 2001 she was bought by the Laxey Towing Company of the Isle of Man, renamed MV Karina and operated out of Douglas. Under the command of local shipmaster, Captain Stephen Carter, the MV Karina's primary operation was to provide pleasure cruises for visitors. She was also made available for private functions and charters.

The Karina suffered some slight damage during a storm over the 2017–2018 winter, although by this time Carter had already decided to conclude the summer cruises at the end of the 2018 season. Rather than undertake the necessary repairs, it was decided to place the vessel up for sale. The Karina was purchased by a concern in West Africa where it is intended that she will operate wildlife cruises on a river in The Gambia.
