= River Link (Devon) =

Ferry, cruise boat and bus operator, based in Devon

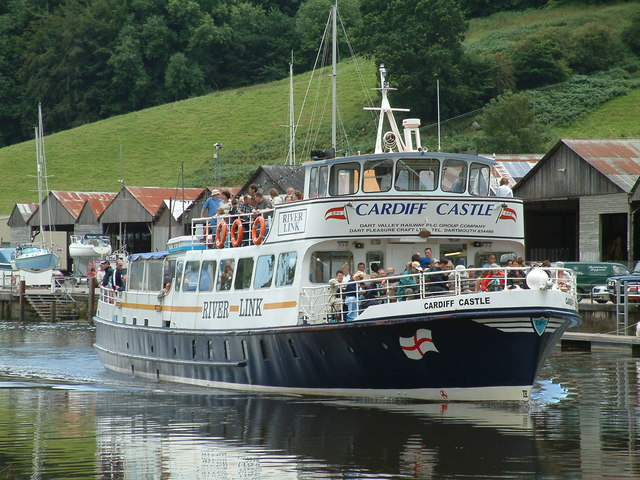
MV Cardiff Castle on a river cruise at Totnes

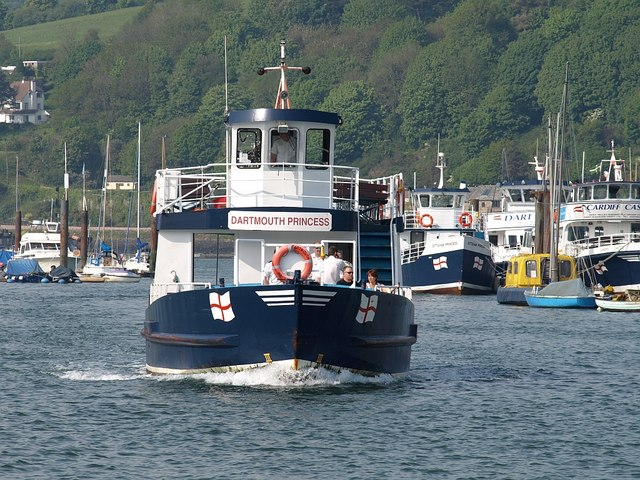
MV Dartmouth Princess operating on the Dartmouth Passenger Ferry. Three sister ships in the River Link fleet can be seen moored to the right.

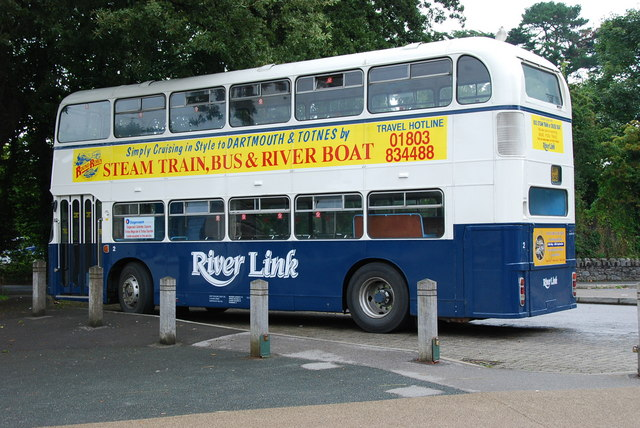
An ECW bodied Bristol VRT/SL3 seen near the Steamer Quay in Totnes

River Link is a ferry, cruise boat, and bus operator, based in Devon, England. The company is owned by Dart Valley Railway plc, who also own and operate the Dartmouth Steam Railway.

== Services ==
River Link operates the Dartmouth Passenger Ferry, which connects the terminus of the steam railway at Kingswear station to the waterfront at Dartmouth, on the opposite bank of River Dart. It also operates river and coastal cruises from Dartmouth, including a cruise the length of the tidal Dart to the Steamer Quay in Totnes.

The railway between Paignton and Kingswear, the ferry from Kingswear to Dartmouth, and the river cruise from Dartmouth to Totnes form three segments of a heavily promoted round-trip known as the Round Robin. In order to close the loop, River Link operates a bus service, often using open top buses, between Totnes and Paignton.

== Current fleet ==
Dart Pleasure Craft currently operates a fleet of eight vessels.

- Kingswear Castle

Kingswear Castle is on long-term loan from the Paddle Steamer Preservation Society. She was built in 1924 at Philip and Sons shipbuilders, using components from an older vessel of the same name. She primarily operates the one hour harbour cruises from Dartmouth, making occasional trips to Totnes. She was out of service for the 2022 season, while undergoing a major refit, but was expected to return for 2023. She re-entered service in June 2024, and is the only coal-fired paddle steamer operational in Britain.

- Cardiff Castle

The largest vessel in the fleet, carrying 400 passengers. Built in 1964 for the River Dart Steamboat Company, she was operated for the Millbrook Steamboat and Trading Company out of Plymouth from 1977. In 1985, she returned to the Dart, and has operated for Dart Pleasure Craft ever since. Presently mainly used on the Totnes service.

- Dart Explorer

A modern catamaran, carrying 300 passengers and built for the company in 1991 as Devonair Belle. She is mainly used on the Dartmouth Day Cruise service, as well as the one hour harbour cruise, and also operates most of the private charters.

- Dartmouth Castle

Built in 1947 by Philip & Son Ship Builders and Engineers, she was previously operated by the Millbrook Steamboat and Trading Company. Although she was originally intended to be built as a paddle steamer, she was fitted with twin diesel engines just before completion. She now operates on the River Dart, mostly on the hour harbour cruises, with occasional trips to Totnes, and as an extra vessel on the Dartmouth passenger ferry.

- Dart Venturer

Originally built as Plymouth Venturer for Plymouth Boat Cruises in 1982, this 300 passenger vessel ran for them until 2002, when it was "swapped" with Dart Pleasure Craft's smaller Plymouth Belle. She normally works the Western Lady Ferry service between Torquay and Brixham.

- Dittisham Princess

Built as the flagship of G.H. Riddalls and Sons' fleet in 1995, this 181 passenger vessel was taken over in 2000. She normally works the Western Lady Ferry service between Torquay and Brixham.

- Dartmouth Princess

Built as the Devon Belle II in 1990, she joined the G.H. Riddalls fleet in 1995. Since being taken over by Dart Pleasure craft in 2000, she has become the main ferry on the short Dartmouth-Kingswear route.

- Kingswear Princess

Built in 1978 at Conyer Marine in Kent as Twin Star II for the Ford factory ferry in Dagenham, the Kingswear Princess was bought by the Dartmouth Riverboat Company in 2010. She is now used in ferry service in tandem with Dartmouth Princess.

== See also ==
- Open top buses in Torbay
