= Laxey Towing Company =

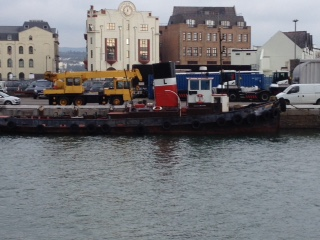
- Laxey Towing Company tug Wendy Ann, berthed at the Office Berth, Douglas Harbour
- Company type: Privately held company
- Industry: Specialised Marine Salvage, Pilotage, Harbour Services, Transportation
- Founded: circa 1978
- Headquarters: Douglas, Isle of Man
- Key people: Captain Stephen Patrick Carter.
- Website: www.iompleasurecruises.com

The Laxey Towing Company Ltd is a privately owned marine salvage company incorporated in the Isle of Man. Its registered office is Clovenstones Cottage, Baldrine, with its company offices situated at 30, North Quay, Douglas, Isle of Man. The company operates under the managerial directorship of Captain Stephen Carter, providing pilotage facilities for the Port of Douglas and has over many years operated a wide variety of services throughout the harbours of the Isle of Man. Up to 2017 it also operated summer coastal cruises on board the pleasure cruiser, MV Karina.

The Laxey Towing Company has also been involved with various salvage operations including the administration and eventual disposal of the wreck of the Scottish scallop dredger, Solway Harvester.

Its primary area of operation covers a sizeable part of the eastern segment of the Irish Sea from Douglas, Isle of Man; to Liverpool Bay, North Wales and Anglesey, the Fylde and Cumbrian coasts, the Solway Firth and southwest Scotland.

Formerly Captain Carter was the senior pilot for the Port of Douglas before his retirement in July, 2023. His final duty in post involved his piloting the Isle of Man Steam Packet Company's new-build Ro-pax ferry Manxman into Douglas upon her arrival following her voyage from the Hyundai Mipo Dockyard, Ulsan, South Korea.

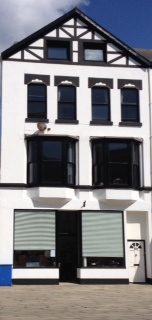
Laxey Towing Company Headquarters. North Quay, Douglas.

== History ==
The Laxey Towing Company has its origins in the late 1970s and initially was involved with light marine work with its original tug Sunrush, as well as providing angling services with its utility boat, the twin-screwed Hopeful Lad.

The company's most challenging operation in its early years centered on the Manx Line linkspan which broke away from its moorings during a severe easterly storm in December 1978. The linkspan was adrift in the outer harbour during the course of which it caused considerable damage to the Victoria Pier. The operation to make the situation safe involved the Sunrush, which was on station for a considerable period whilst attempts were made to secure the linkspan, which at one stage was in danger of coming into contact with the Douglas Sea Terminal. Finally the linkspan was secured, and was then taken into the sheltered inner harbour thus preventing any further damage from occurring.

Subsequently the linkspan was taken under tow by a tug from United Towing in order for repairs to be carried out. Once the linkspan was repaired it was reattached to its mooring position at the No. 1 Berth in Douglas Harbour.

By this time it was widely accepted that the operations in the Port of Douglas were severely affected during periods of strong easterly wind, and work began on a new breakwater to afford greater shelter to the port in 1980. The Laxey Towing Company were to be heavily involved in the course of construction, servicing the construction barges and assisting with the deepening of the approach channel.

It was generally accepted that the Sunrush was becoming obsolete, and so the fleet was augmented by the more suitable Union, with the two vessels working in unison. It was the situation however that the Sunrush required replacement, and was subsequently sold with the larger tug Salisbury being introduced as a replacement circa 1982. As part of the breakwater construction another tug, Cabot, was chartered, however that vessel's suitability for the operation appeared open to question.

It was during 1982 that the Isle of Man Steam Packet Company withdrew its last passenger steamer Manxman, which had used assistance from both Laxey Towing Company tugs during the course of berthing at Douglas. On her final departure from her home port on the evening of 4 September 1982, Manxman, was given a "guard of honour" by the company tugs as well as receiving rousing salutes from both vessels.

It was also during the early part of the 1980s that the Laxey Towing Company expanded its sea-going cargo services, operating from numerous ports around the northern area of the Irish Sea to Douglas and Castletown. Larger sea-going barges were acquired which were also able to use the shallow water port of Castletown, a fact which was very much to the advantage of coal merchants GMS Fuels which found the service of great use in supplying their Douglas and Balthane depots.

This period also saw Captain Carter invest in road-going heavy haulage vehicles, which were operated under the trading name S.P. Carter, Baldrine. These vehicles included a Scammell heavy transporter, an AEC Matador as well as a traction engine. Also at this time a new company was formed; Bulk Cargo Services, with the intention of providing comprehensive stevedore services.

In April 1985, the Isle of Man Steam Packet Company acquired a new vessel, the highly unsuitable Mona's Isle which it employed on its Douglas - Heysham schedule. The Mona's Isle encountered significant trouble berthing at Douglas, and so again the tugs of the Laxey Towing Company were called upon to render assistance with both the Union and Salisbury involved in the operation. Subsequently after only six months in operation, Mona's Isle was withdrawn from service in October 1985.

Later that year, in November 1985, the coaster Sulby River ran aground in Ramsey Bay after departing the port. The Laxey Towing Company successfully salvaged the vessel after she had lain aground for several days.

As the decade continued shipments of coal to the Isle of Man began to decline, and a period of consolidation was undertaken by the company during which more specialised tasks were pursued as the Laxey Towing Company sought to establish itself in niche related markets, and into the 1990s this diversification continued.

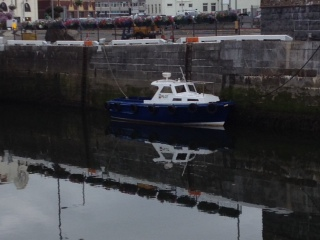
Douglas Pilot vessel MV Girl Mary.

Until 1994, the operation of the Douglas pilot launch had been the responsibility of General Marine Services Ltd, a company which had worked closely with the Laxey Towing Company on numerous collaborations over a period of many years.

Coupled to the Douglas operation, it is often the case that during periods of strong northwesterly wind, operations into and out of the Port of Liverpool are prone to difficulty, with the transferring of pilots between vessels proving particularly hazardous. It is during such periods that it is routine for the Liverpool Pilots to be boarded at the pilot station off Douglas Head, and again this operation was undertaken by General Marine Services with the pilot boat Girl Mary.

At this time General Marine Services underwent a period of restructuring, the consequence of which was the pursuit of a more core related business. As a result of this, pilotage services into and out of the Port of Douglas, coupled with the Liverpool Pilot operation were subsequently undertaken by the Laxey Towing Company together with the ship berthing services which had also been operated by General Marine Services, and part of this included the acquisition of the Girl Mary.

== Current operation ==
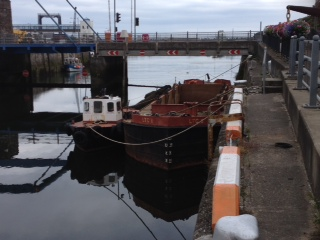
Laxey Towing Company workboat Lonan and slurry barge, berthed at the South Quay, Douglas

The Laxey Towing Company still provides pilotage services to the Port of Douglas and on occasion the Port of Liverpool.

Allied to this, the company still undertakes a wide and varied operation ranging from harbour maintenance in the form of dredging to offering tender services to the numerous cruise liners which now visit Douglas.

== Historic operations ==
=== MV Karina ===
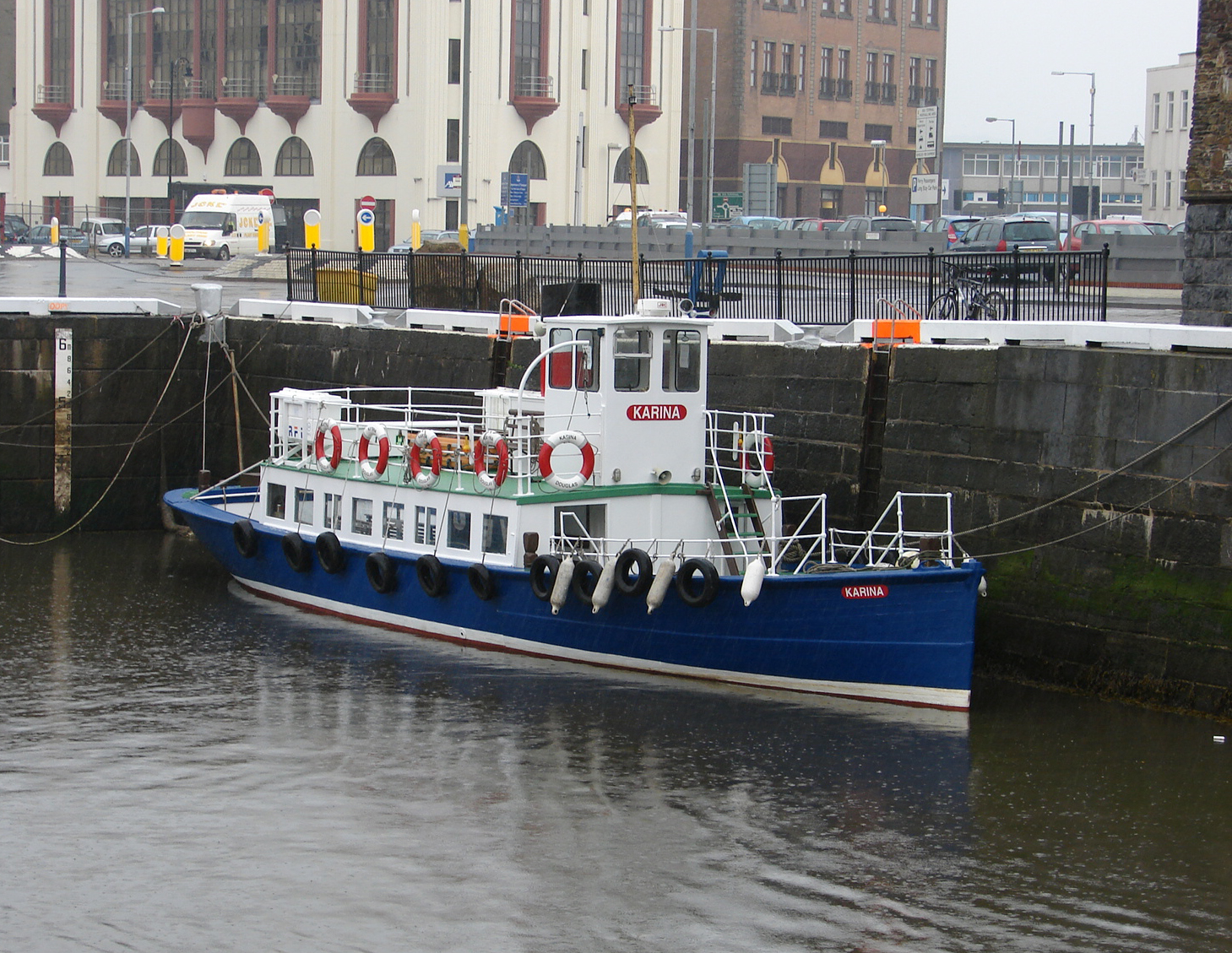
MV Karina berthed at the Double Corner, Douglas.

In 2001 the Laxey Towing Company set about re-establishing a service predominately aimed towards tourists to the Isle of Man, with the re-introduction of coastal cruises during the summer visiting season. Captain Carter was no stranger to this service, being part of a generation of experienced Douglas boat operators. Captain Carter undertook the service personally, sharing his wealth of local knowledge during the course of the cruise. The re-introduction of this part of the Manx Tourist Industry proved popular with visitors and locals alike. The end of the 2017 tourist season saw the termination of the service, and the Karina was subsequently sold to an operator in The Gambia.

=== Solway Harvester ===
Following the subsequent raising of the Scottish scallop dredger the Solway Harvester, the vessel lay tied up at Douglas Harbour during a protracted and laborious legal wrangle. Finally in November 2013 work began on scrapping the vessel, with the work undertaken by the Laxey Towing Company. A somewhat fraught operation followed, however work was completed in January 2014, 14 years after the vessel foundered.

== Gallery ==
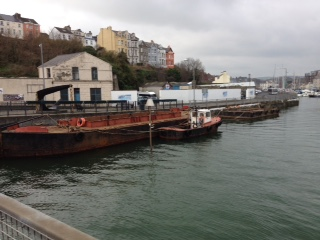
LTC utility boat Lonan, slurry barge and pontoon.

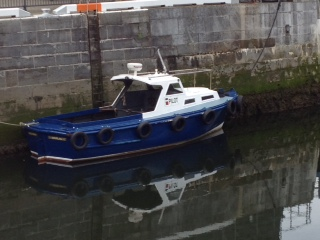
Douglas Pilot Launch MV Girl Mary.

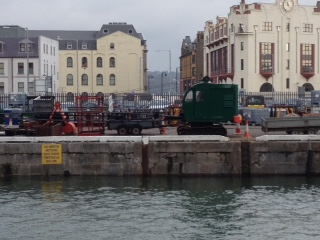
Laxey Towing Company dredging crane pictured at Douglas Harbour.

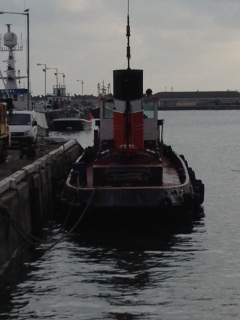
Stern view of tug Wendy Ann.
