= Millbrook Steamboat and Trading Co. =

The Millbrook Steamboat & Trading Company was a ferry operator on the River Tamar between Devon and Cornwall in England. It was started in 1894, and initially operated a ferry route from Millbrook in Cornwall to Plymouth. It expanded, and eventually became the largest river boat operator in the Plymouth area. From 1943 it operated the Cremyll Ferry.

The company also operated bus services on the Rame Peninsula in Cornwall. The bus services were eventually taken over by Western National.

In 1980 the company was sold to Dart Pleasure Craft. In 1985 the new owners pulled out of operations in the Plymouth area, and the company closed.

== Fleet list ==
Name	Built	Company service	Notes
SS Despatch	1884	1894–1900?	
SS Cornubia	1895	1895–1921	Used almost entirely on the Millbrook ferry
SS Devonia	1896	1896–1918?	Excursion steamer, sometimes used on Millbrook ferry
PS Britannia	1900	1900–1937	Excursion & ferry services
SS Iolanthe	1887	1900–1909?	
PS Hibernia	1903	1903–1928	Excursion steamer
PS Brunel	1905	1909–1916	Excursion steamer, originally from Thames service
MV Manna / Devon Belle	1922	1927–1979	River excursions. Renamed Devon Belle 1936.
MV Lady Elizabeth	1924	1930–1979	Various services
PS Whitsand Castle	1903	1932–1935	Unsuccessful Millbrook Ferry service
MV Tamar Belle	1927	1932?–1959	Millbrook & Cremyll Ferry
MV Western Belle	1935	1935–1985	River and coastal excursions
MV Southern Belle	1925	1946–1985	River excursions
MV Northern Belle	1926	1946–1985	Cremyll Ferry
MV Eastern Belle	1946	1957–1985	River excursions
MV Plymouth Belle	1961	1961–1985	Cawsand Ferry
MV Dartmouth Castle	1948	1975–1977	Returned to Plymouth from time to time between 1980 and 1985
MV Cardiff Castle	1964	1977–1985	Occasionally returned to Plymouth after 1977
Edgecumbe Belle	1959	1979–1985	Cremyll & Drakes Island Ferry
MV Queen Boadicea II	1936	1980?–1985	Drakes Island Ferry
