= Philip and Son =

Former shipbuilding company in Kingswear, Devon

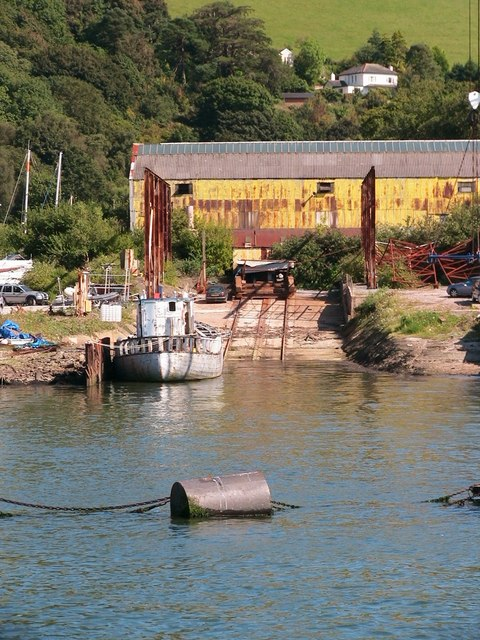
- Philip and Son boatyard
- Type: Public limited company
- Industry: Shipbuilding
- Predecessor: William Kelly
- Founded: 1858
- Founder: George Philip
- Defunct: October 1999
- Fate: Defunct
- Successor: Noss Marina Limited
- Headquarters: Kingswear, Devon, England

Philip and Son (also Philip & Son) was a shipbuilder in Kingswear, near Dartmouth, Devon, England. Operating from 1858 until the late 1990s, the company provided employment opportunities for nearly 141 years for many people of Dartmouth. It was Dartmouth's last industrial shipyard. A documentary film, Philip and Son, A Living Memory, presents the story of the industrial shipyard from its beginning to its eventual closure.

== Early history ==
William Kelly began modernizing Dartmouth's Sandquay yard in the 1800s. George Philip (d. November 1874, aged 61 years) left Aberdeen for Dartmouth in 1854, becoming Kelly's foreman shipwright, and managing three slipways at Sandquay. With Kelly's retirement in 1858, Philip took over the yard. Shortly afterwards, Philip's son Alexander (nickname, Alec; d. 1899) entered the business. In 1874, Alexander inherited the yard. In the 1880s and 1890s, Philip & Son collaborated with Simpson, Strickland and Company of Noss Shipyard on recreational craft production.

Alexander died in 1899, leaving the yard to his sons, George Nowell Philip and John Nowell Philip. G.N. Philip became managing director, and was assisted by his brother, J.N. Philip and his brother-in-law, John Jules Sautter (d. 1951). In 1905, the business became a limited liability company. Its 1908 advertisement in International Marine Engineering stated that the company produced steam and sailing yachts; passenger and cargo steamers; tugs, steam and motor launches; admiralty launches and pinnaces; as well as all classes of main and auxiliary machinery and boilers.

Philip & Son took over Noss Works from Simpson, Strickland in 1918, and within two years, they opened a machine shop at Noss. During these years, Philip & Son specialized in the construction of tugboats, first in wood and later steel. By 1923, Swan, Hunter and Wigham Richardson, Ltd. had a controlling share in Philip and Son, Ltd. In the mid-1920s, the shipyard began construction of coastal tankers, ferries and excursion boats, while in the next decade, in addition to ships, boats, and barges, the company produced kits for overseas assembly of small crafts. In 1934, after the death of G. N. Philip, Sautter became the company's managing director. It became a public limited company in 1937.

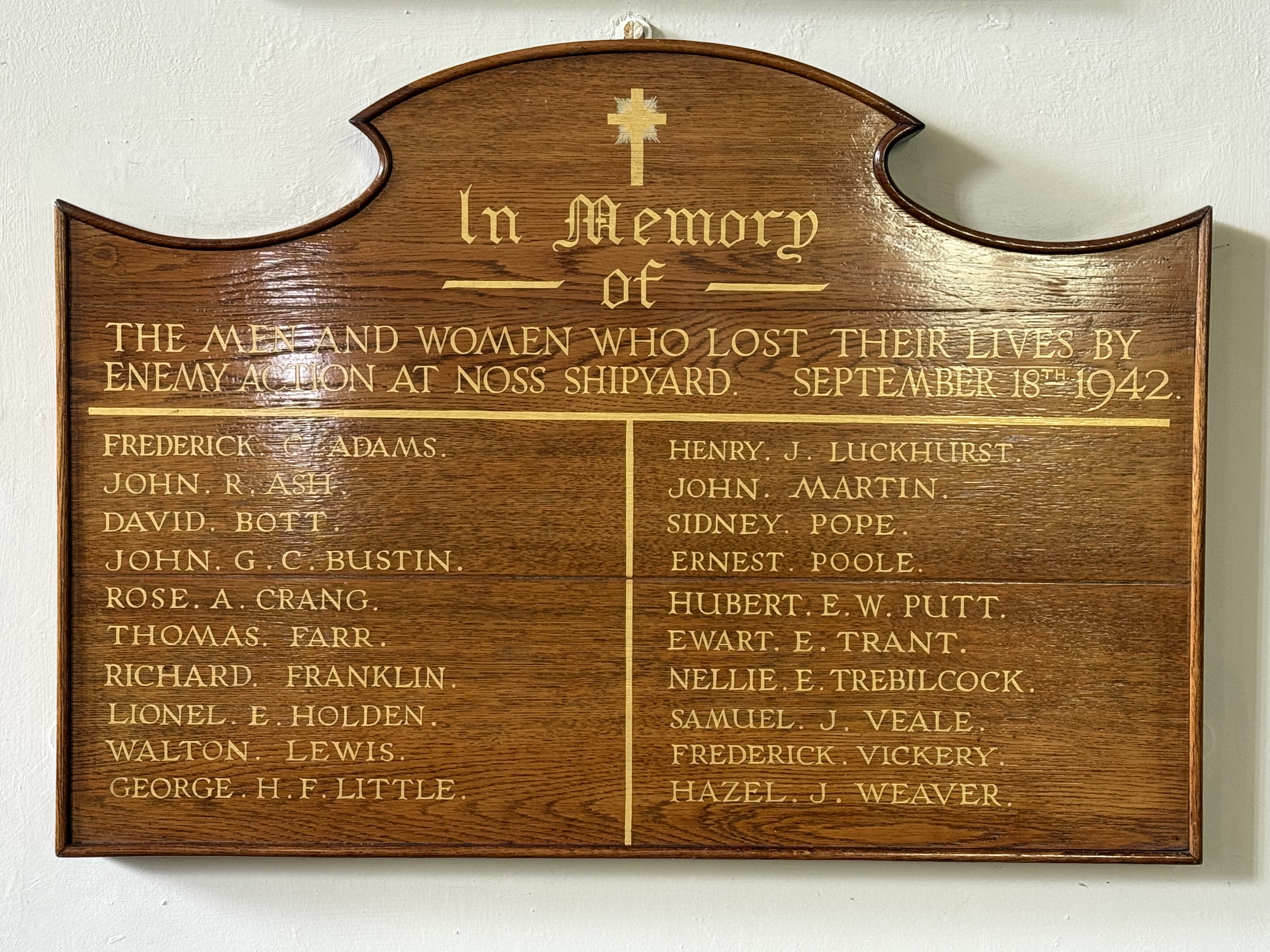
Memorial in the Church of St Thomas of Canterbury, Kingswear to those killed by enemy action at the shipyard on 18 September 1942

Prior to World War II, the company worked on fully non-magnetic research on an Admiralty ship; it was launched in April 1939. Soon after the war started, further research work on the ship was discontinued (after the war, the project was abandoned) and the shipyard concentrated on Admiralty work related to the war effort. To this end, 230 steel and wood vessels, corvettes, wooden minesweepers and air-sea rescues launches for the air force were built. During this period, the yard also repaired existing crafts. During a bombing of Dartmouth by Luftwaffe bombs on 18 September 1942, the Philip & Son shipyard was hit and 20 employees were killed. Two students of the Naval college were also killed. The bombs not only hit the shipyard at Noss but also the Dartmouth Harbour, sinking lighter aircraft in mid-air. The company managed to operate, however, even after the attack. The general manager was awarded M.B.E., in appreciation of his dedicated efforts to start production within 48 hours after the bombing. Frank Little could not identify his own brother's body after the bomb had hit the yard.

== Later years ==
The building program prospered in the years after the war. Sautter retired in 1947 after working for Philip &Son for almost half a century. In 1950, the directors were T. Wilton (chairman), J. A. Philip (Managing), H. G. Philip, J. J. Sautter, and G. M. Turnbull. In the 1950s, it built coasters, tankers, ferries, tugs, as well as cargo and passenger ships for foreign concerns. John Alexander Philip (b. 1896) (Shipyard Manager, 1923–42; director, 1930; assistant managing director, 1942–47; managing director, 1947) became chairman in 1957. The shipyard and subsidiary companies experienced a change in 1965 and in 1969. By 1981, the company's specializations had turned to repairing ships, steel fabrication, and marine engineering. Bob Weedon, who began his career at the shop floor, was works manager in 1996, and became a member of the board of directors. D.R. Wills was managing director in 1996. Ship and boat building were discontinued in October 1999. The shipyard site is currently owned by Noss Marina Limited, which operates a marina.

A documentary film Philip and Son, A Living Memory, made with the support of the new owners of the Noss Marina by Totnes film-maker Chris Watson (of Smith and Watson Productions) and journalist and writer Phil Scoble and premiered in 2009, presents the story of the industrial shipyard from its beginning in the 1880s to its eventual closure in the 1990s (caused by differences with trade unions and decline in the British shipbuilding industry). The film was sponsored by Noss Marina (now a leisure marina) to retain the yard as a heritage site. Many of the former employees of the firm enthusiastically participated in making the film and expressing their experiences with the firm.

== Ships built ==
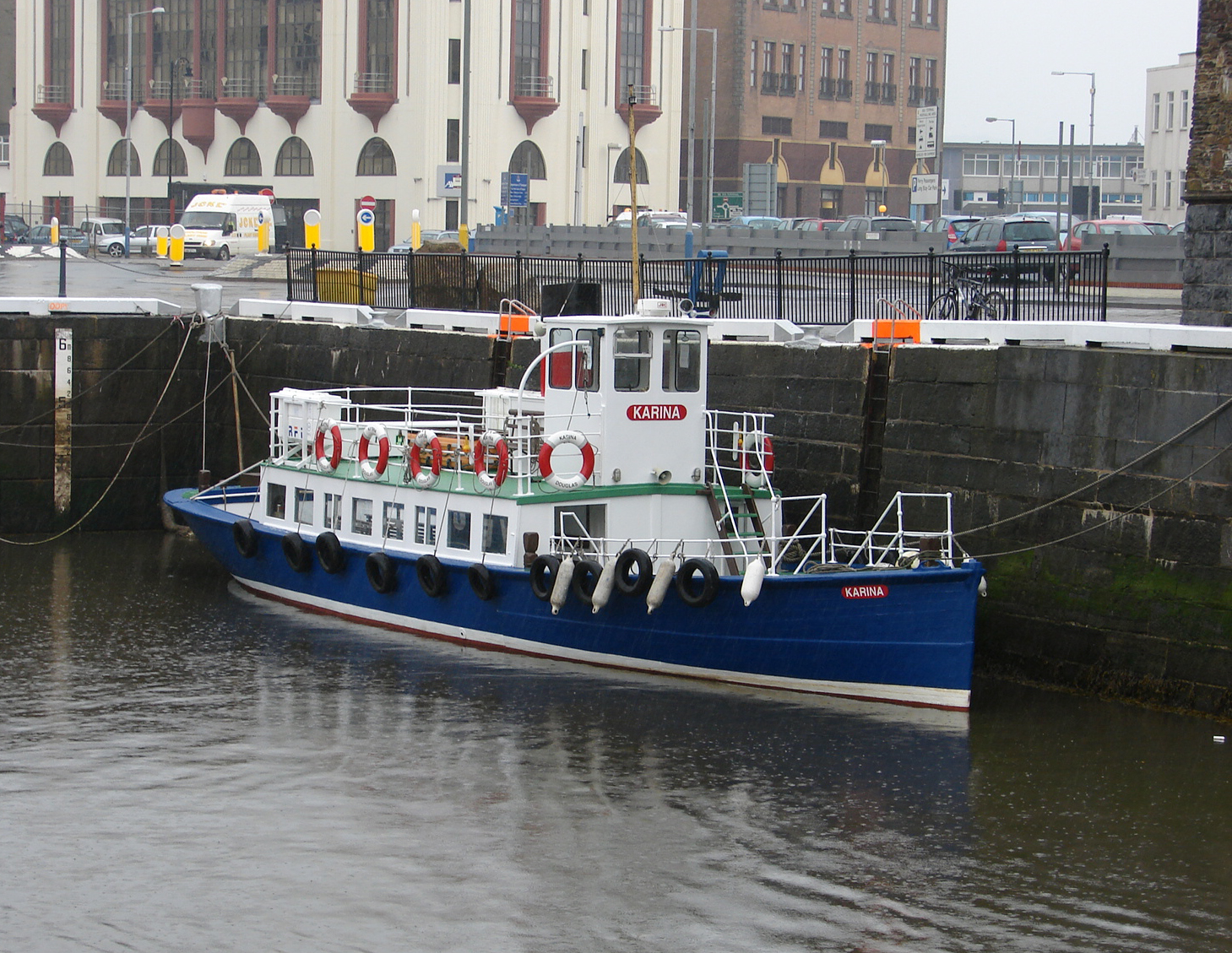
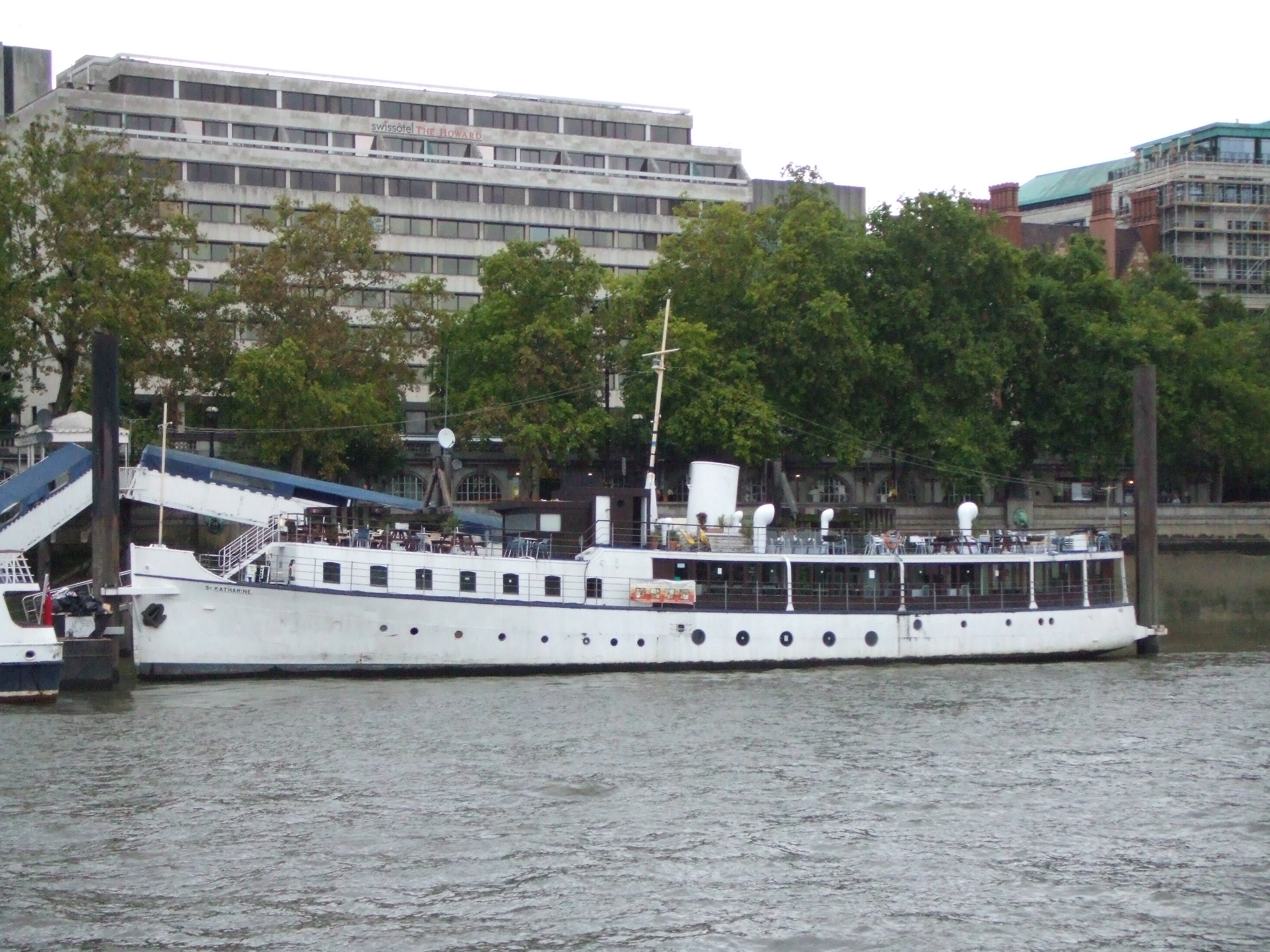
Left: MV Karina. Right: St Katherine
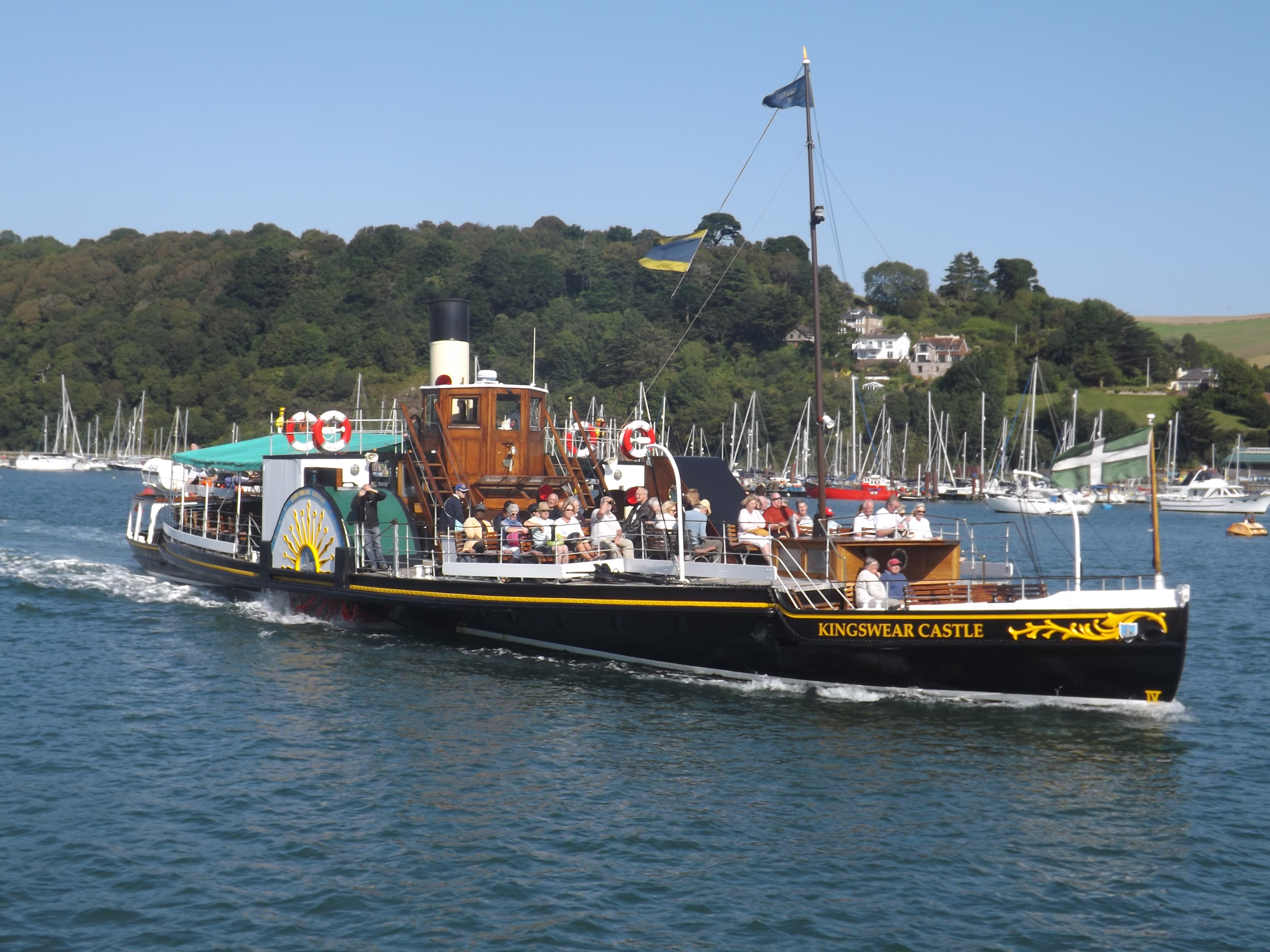
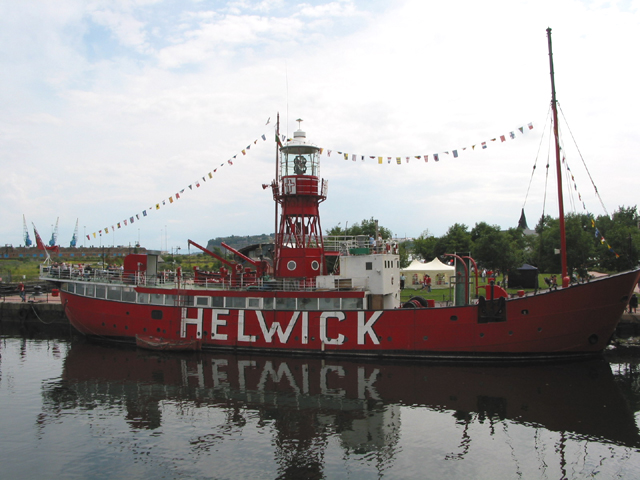
Left: PS Kingswear Castle. Right: Lightship 2000

The yard during 141 years (1858 to 1999) of existence built historic naval vessels (of thousands of tonnage), lightships (with a light tower on a boat), and Chay Blyth's yacht British Steel which was used for a round the world voyage in 1970–71. Some of the vessels built at Philip & Son include:

- Lightship 2000
- Light Vessel 11
- Light Vessel 13, Bar
- Light Vessel 18, Ex Trinity House
- Light Vessel 21
- Light Vessel 23, Bar
- Light Vessel 88
- Light Vessel 89, The Wash
- Light Vessel 91, Humber
- Light Vessel 94, Morecambe Bay
- MV Dartmouth Castle
- MV Karina
- MV Lady Wakefield
- PS Kingswear Castle
- British Steel
- Light Vessel 16, Colne Light
- MV Edmund Gardner
- Egremont
- HSL 3963 Crebe
- Ione lll
- MV Royal Iris of the Mersey
- MV Snowdrop
- Jaymac
- Senorita
- St Katherine
- Tern IV – powered sailing yacht launched in 1924 for Dr. Claud Worth
- Alzavola – powered sailing yacht launched as Gracie III in 1924 and twin to Tern IV
- Dwyn Wen
- Trinity
- RV Sarsia

Trinity House lightvessels kept their 'build' number but their name could be changed after withdrawal from station and being allocated to a new station off the English or Welsh coasts. Of 26 built by the firm, No.18, of revolutionary design, was delivered in July 1958 for stationing off the Pembrokeshire coast in Wales and being named St Govan. Its predecessor, of conventional Trinity House format, was named St Gowan. Many surviving 2-masted lightvessels latterly had their aft mast removed and instead, a helicopter deck was fitted and such have survived on some older unmanned TH lightvessels still in service.
