= MV Cardiff Castle =

Twin screw passenger ship operated in the United Kingdom

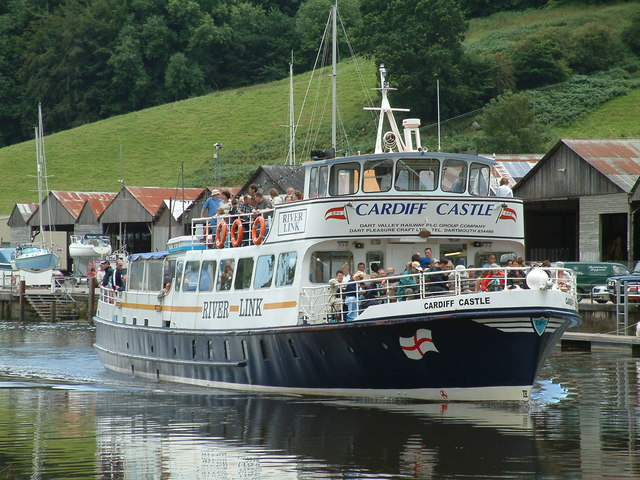
- MV Cardiff Castle at Totnes in River Link colours

History

United Kingdom
- Name: MV Cardiff Castle
- Namesake: Cardiff Castle in Cardiff, UK
- Owner: River Dart Steamboat Co Ltd (1964); Millbrook Steamboat & Trading Co Ltd (1977); Dart Pleasure Craft Ltd(1985)
- Route: River Dart (1964); Plymouth (1977); River Dart (1985)
- Builder: Bolson, Poole, UK
- Cost: £33,000
- Launched: 1964
- Sponsored by: Mrs N.L. Wade
- Refit: 1977
- Identification: IMO number: 8633839
- Status: Operating on the River Dart between Dartmouth and Totnes

General characteristics
- Type: Twin-screw motor vessel
- Tonnage: 115 GRT
- Length: 100 ft (30 m) LOA
- Beam: 21 ft (6.4 m)
- Draught: 3.5 ft (1.1 m)
- Depth: 8.3 ft (2.5 m)
- Decks: 3
- Propulsion: Twin Glennifer Diesels
- Speed: 9 Kts
- Capacity: 400 passengers

The MV Cardiff Castle is a twin screw passenger vessel, operating on the River Dart in South Devon, UK, mainly on the cruise / ferry route between Dartmouth and Totnes, but also on circular cruises from Dartmouth, for Dart Pleasure Craft Ltd.

== History ==
MV Cardiff Castle was built in 1964 for the River Dart Steamboat Co Ltd (RDSC) by Bolson's of Poole. She was a near sister of Conway Castle and was built to replace Totnes Castle. She was originally fitted with Totnes Castle's wheelhouse on a flying bridge structure above her main (open) passenger deck. She also had a lounge on the lower deck. She operated passenger services on the Dart until 1977; by that time, she was the last passenger vessel owned by RDSC. In 1977, she was sold to Millbrook Steamboat & Trading Co Ltd, then the largest operator of cruises from Plymouth. They rebuilt her to her current condition, with a large deckhouse on the main deck, and open deck seating above, behind a new wheelhouse. The bar is still located on the lower deck. In 1980, the Millbrook Company and all of its vessels were bought by Dart Free Houses Ltd, parent company of Dart Pleasure Craft Ltd. In 1985, the Millbrook operation was wound up and there were various transfers of vessels between the fleets of different south Devon companies. Cardiff Castle returned to the Dart, and can now be seen operating regularly on her original route from Dartmouth to Totnes.
