= MV Humphrey Gilbert =

Single-screw passenger vessel

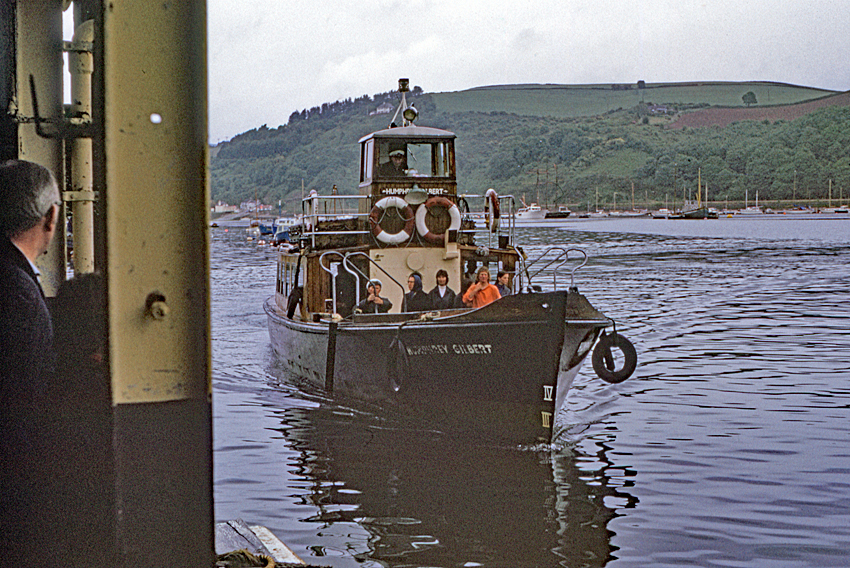
- MV Humphrey Gilbert in 1973

History

United Kingdom
- Name: MV Humphrey Gilbert; MV Edgcumbe Belle
- Namesake: Sir Humphrey Gilbert
- Owner: British Railways (1957); Dartmouth Borough Council (1972); South Hams District Council (1974); St Mawes Ferry Co Ltd (1976); British Railways (1977); Meridian Line Cruises (1978); Millbrook Steamboat & Trading Co Ltd (1979); Dart Pleasure Craft Ltd (1985); Plymouth Boat Trips (2017)
- Route: Dartmouth–Kingswear (1957); Laid up (1976); Plymouth (1979); Dartmouth–Kingswear (1985); Cremyll Ferry (2013)
- Ordered: 1956
- Builder: Blackmore & Sons Bideford
- Launched: 1957
- Renamed: MV Edgcumbe Belle
- Home port: Plymouth
- Status: Operating on the River Tamar between Admirals Hard and Cremyll

General characteristics
- Type: Single-screw motor vessel
- Tonnage: 34.65t
- Length: LOA 57.9 ft (17.6 m) LWL 56 ft (17 m)
- Beam: 13.4 ft (4.1 m)
- Draft: 4.9 ft (1.5 m)
- Decks: 2
- Installed power: Doosan L136 (160hp)
- Speed: 11 Knots
- Capacity: 128 Passengers
- Crew: 2

The MV Edgcumbe Belle is a single screw passenger vessel, operating from Plymouth, Devon, UK to Cremyll for Plymouth Boat Trips.

== History ==
The Dartmouth–Kingswear Passenger Ferry is primarily used to link the town of Dartmouth with the railway station on the other side of the River Dart at Kingswear. It has long been operated by the railway companies, who maintained a 'station' at the Dartmouth side of the river, with no tracks; instead, passengers boarded the ferry to Kingswear, and thence the train towards Paignton.

In 1954 British Railways, the then-operator of the ferry, decided that their present vessel, the SS Mew, was too expensive to operate, and decided to replace her with a smaller and cheaper motor vessel.

They chartered first the MV Lady Elizabeth and then the MV Western Belle from the Millbrook Steamboat & Trading Co Ltd of Plymouth. The former vessel was unsuitable for the route; however, the latter appears to have been quite successful, although there were complaints about the use of a Plymouth vessel, when suitable vessels were available from Dartmouth, so the MV Western Belle was replaced by the River Dart Steamboat Co Ltd's MV Seymour Castle.

In 1956, British Rail finally ordered two motor vessels of their own from Blackmore & Sons of Bideford, North Devon. They were named MV Adrian Gilbert and MV Humphrey Gilbert, after two famous local explorers from Greenway House. In 1972 British Railways closed the railway from Goodrington to Kingswear. The ferry route, and vessels, passed into local authority ownership, first Dartmouth Borough Council, then South Hams District Council. In 1976 the ferry was taken over by Dart Pleasure Craft Ltd, but both vessels were sold to the St Mawes Ferry Co, for service from Falmouth, Cornwall to St Mawes. They were deemed unsuitable, however, and there is some doubt as to whether they ever left the Dart.

The Humphrey Gilbert was seen and photographed in BR 'Rail Blue' livery at Weymouth Harbour in June 1977. British Rail repurchased them for use on the River Thames on the Gravesend–Tilbury Ferry. Again they were deemed unsuitable, and both were re-engined and sold. MV Adrian Gilbert was sold to Dart Pleasure Craft, and returned to the Dartmouth-Kingswear Ferry. MV Humphrey Gilbert was laid up in Newhaven, East Sussex, and in 1978 was sold to Meridian Line Cruises of Greenwich on the River Thames, but remained laid up.

In 1978 Humphrey Gilbert was purchased by the Millbrook Steamboat and Trading Co, renamed MV Edgcumbe Belle and used on the Plymouth–Drake's Island ferry, also relieving on the Cremyll Ferry from time to time. She remained with the Millbrook Company after it was taken over by Dart Pleasure Craft Ltd, but in 1985 Dart Pleasure Craft withdrew from the Plymouth area, and MV Edgcumbe Belle returned to the Dart, and joined her sister on the Dartmouth–Kingswear ferry. In 1996 the Adrian Gilbert was again sold to operate on the St Mawes ferry, and was replaced by the MV Kingswear Belle. In 2000 Dart Pleasure Craft Ltd bought G.H. Riddalls and Sons' fleet, and introduced the former Riddalls vessel Dartmouth Princess on the Kingswear ferry. MV Edgcumbe Belle was used on a new service to Greenway Quay, where the National Trust had opened Agatha Christie's house and gardens to the public (incidentally, this house was previously the home of the Gilbert family, after which the vessel was originally named). This service was later withdrawn and Dart Pleasure Craft instead market the Greenway Ferry Company's similar service. MV Edgcumbe Belle is now back as the relief boat on the Kingswear ferry, and sees considerable operation on the route, as the MV Kingswear Belle now appears to receive little use.

Dart Pleasure Craft Ltd is now owned by Dart Valley Railway plc, owners of the Paignton and Dartmouth Steam Railway, so the ownership and operation of the vessel have come full circle, and once again passengers from Dartmouth buy their train tickets to include the ferry to Kingswear.

In 2013 following the sinking of the MV''Northern Belle'' the Edgcumbe Belle transferred Ownership to Tamar Cruising, where it operated as the [Cremyll Ferry] following the sale of Tamar Cruising to Plymouth Boat Trips, the MV Edgcumbe Belle, continues its daily work as the Cremyll Ferry under its current operator - Plymouth Boat Trips.
