= Seymour Castle =

River boat

History

United Kingdom
- Name: Seymour Castle (1938–1972); Scomber (1972–1977); Southern Comfort of Plymstock (1977–1982); Dartmothian (1982–1997); Devon Belle (1997–present)
- Owner: River Dart Steamboat Co Ltd (1938–1972); Tony & Hillary Soper (1972–1977); KT Bridge (1977–1982); G.H. Riddalls and Sons (1982–1997); KJ Bridge (1997–1999); Thames River Cruises (1999–present)
- Route: River Dart (1938); Plymouth (1972); River Dart (1982); Plymouth (1997); River Thames (1999)
- Builder: Ferris and Blank
- Cost: £2,079
- Launched: 1938
- Refit: 2000
- Status: In service

General characteristics
- Type: Twin-screw motor vessel
- Length: 60 ft (18 m) LOA
- Beam: 14.67 ft (4.47 m)
- Draught: 3.5 ft (1.1 m)
- Decks: 2
- Propulsion: Twin diesels
- Capacity: 100 passengers

MV Seymour Castle is a river boat sailing for Thames River Cruises of Reading, England as the MV Devon Belle. She is registered by National Historic Ships on the National Register of Historic Vessels, certificate number 1955, and is one of the surviving "Little ships of Dunkirk" from the Dunkirk evacuation in 1940.

== Design ==
Seymour Castle was built to a typical river boat design, with a lower deck, fully enclosed saloon with bar and an open deck above, fitted with a canopy. The large forward open deck, and small open deck at the stern are around halfway between the two levels. The wheelhouse is located on the upper deck. She was built with large windows for the full length of her lower saloon. These were replaced with rather small portholes during her time as MV Scomber but were restored during her time as Dartmothian.

== History ==
The ship was built for the River Dart Steamboat Co Ltd by Ferris and Blank of Creekside Boatyard near Dartmouth, Devon. She was the largest vessel ever built by this yard, which specialised in the construction of motor yachts and rowing boats, and was built of local oak frames, with pitch pine planking. She only had one year in service before the declaration of World War II. In May 1940, she travelled to the Dover Straits to assist in the Dunkirk Evacuation and remained in Admiralty service in the Folkestone area until the end of the war, when she returned to the Dart.

In 1972, with reducing traffic on the Dart, she was sold to the naturalist and writer Tony Soper, who gave her a major refit, with a new wheelhouse, portholes replacing her cabin windows and a saloon equipped for lectures. She was also equipped with beam trawl, plankton nets, charts, books and microscopes for passenger use. She was used on wildlife spotting cruises from Plymouth and Dartmouth, including a number of six-day cruises under charter to the National Trust, with passengers spending nights ashore in hotels. In 1977, she returned to conventional cruises, based out of Plymouth, for KT Bridge, under the name MV Southern Comfort of Plymstock.

In 1982, she returned to the Dart, under the ownership of G.H. Riddalls and Sons, was renamed MV Dartmothian, and resumed her Dartmouth to Totnes sailings and circular cruises from Dartmouth. Following the introduction of the MV Dartmouth Princess in 1994 and the MV Dittisham Princess in 1995, she saw little use, and was sold to KJ Bridge, and renamed the MV Devon Belle, resuming the "dockyard and warships" cruises from Plymouth Hoe.

In 1999, MV Devon Belle was sold to Thames River Cruises of Caversham, Berkshire, near Reading on the River Thames. She underwent a major restoration, during which she returned to Dunkirk as part of the 2000 Dunkirk reunion. She now operates trips to Mapledurham House and circular cruises.
