= BPA =

BPA may refer to:

== Organizations ==
=== Companies ===
- BPA Worldwide, an American company that audits circulation figures for mass media
- Banca Privada d'Andorra
- Blue Panorama Airlines, ICAO code
- British Pipeline Agency, a joint venture between BP Oil UK and Shell UK
- Bush Pilot Airways (a.k.a. Air Queensland), a former Australian airline

=== Associations ===
- Boardgame Players Association
- British Parking Association
- British Parachute Association
- British Paralympic Association
- British Paediatric Association
- British Philosophical Association
- British Pyrotechnists Association
- Metropolitan Black Police Association, a body representing Black and Asian members of the Metropolitan Police in London, United Kingdom

=== Other organizations ===
- Bangladesh Police Academy
- Bonneville Power Administration, a U.S. power authority
- Bradford Park Avenue A.F.C., an association football club
- British Paramedic Association, a former title of the College of Paramedics, a professional body for paramedics in the UK
- British Podcast Awards
- Bureau of Pensions Advocates, a semi-independent unit of Veterans Affairs Canada that provides legal support to Vets and RCMP
- Busan Port Authority
- Business and Professionals Alliance for Hong Kong, a pro-establishment political party in Hong Kong
- Business Professionals of America, a career and technical student organization that is headquartered in Columbus, Ohio

== Science and technology ==
- Bisphenol A, a carbon-based synthetic compound used in the manufacture of certain plastics
- Bloodstain pattern analysis, a technique in forensic science
- Beta-Nitropropionic acid, a mycotoxin
- Branch prediction analysis, in cryptography
- Business process automation
- Boronophenylalanine, a chemical used in neutron capture therapy of cancer

== Other uses ==
- Beaumont-Port Arthur metropolitan area
- Beaulieu Park railway station (station code), Essex, England
- Brighton Port Authority, an alias for musician Norman Cook (born 1963), better known as Fatboy Slim
- Oracle BPA Suite, Business Process Analysis software

== See also ==
- PBA (disambiguation)
