= PBA =

PBA may refer to:

== Places ==
- Province of Buenos Aires, a province in Argentina

=== Facilities and structures ===
- Pine Bluff Arsenal, Jefferson County, Arkansas, USA; a military installation near the city of Pine Bluff
- Pinnacle Bank Arena, a sports arena in Lincoln, Nebraska, USA
- PeoplesBank Arena, a sports arena in Hartford, Connecticut, USA

== Transportation ==
- Thalys PBA, trainsets of the SNCF TGV Réseau

=== Aviation ===
- Provincetown-Boston Airlines (IATA airline code: PT; ICAO airline code: PBA) USA; defunct
- PB Air (IATA airline code: 9Q; ICAO airline code: PBA) Thailand; defunct

== Organizations ==
- Advertising Board of the Philippines, formerly the Philippine Board of Advertising
- Palm Beach Atlantic University
- Police Benevolent Association, or Patrolmen's Benevolent Association
- PBA Partylist, or Puwersa ng Bayaning Atleta, a political party in the Philippines

=== Sports leagues ===
- Philippine Basketball Association
- Professional Bowlers Association, a professional tenpin bowling organization in the United States
  - PBA Tour, an American professional bowling competition

== Other uses ==
- Lead-Acid Battery (PbA)
- Partial-birth abortion or intact dilation and extraction
- Peroxybenzoic acid
- Phone Book Access, a Bluetooth profile
- Photopolymerization-based signal amplification, an immunoassay method
- Pre-boot authentication
- Probability bounds analysis, a mathematical method of risk analysis
- Pseudobulbar affect, the pathological expression of laughter, crying, or smiling
- Project bank account

== See also ==
- BPA (disambiguation)
