= Humphrey Gilbert (disambiguation) =

Humphrey Gilbert (1539–1583) was an English adventurer, colonialist and MP at the court of Elizabeth I.

Humphrey Gilbert may also refer to:

- Humphrey Gilbert (cricketer) (1886–1960), Indian-born English cricketer
- CCGS Sir Humphrey Gilbert, Canadian Coast Guard icebreaker, renamed Polar Prince

== See also ==
- MV Humphrey Gilbert
