= Dawnus =

British construction company

- Industry: Construction
- Founded: 2001
- Defunct: March 2019
- Fate: Placed into administration
- Headquarters: Swansea, Wales
- Number of employees: 700 (2019)

Dawnus was a British construction company. Established in 2001 the company grew rapidly in the early 2000s, but went into administration in 2019. The company had operations in the United Kingdom and West Africa.

== History ==
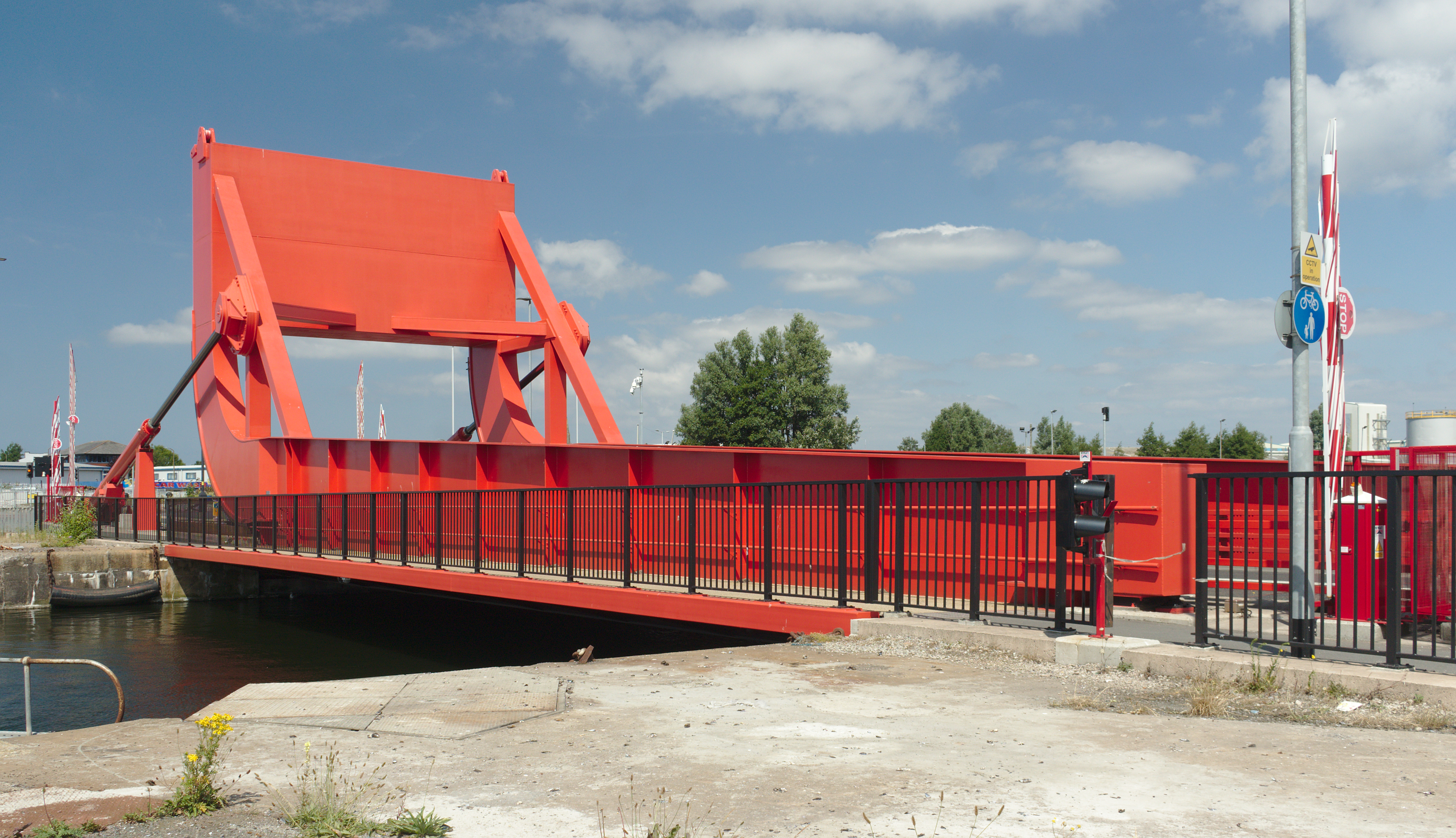
Tower Road Bridge

Dawnus was founded as a contractor in 2001 and had its headquarters at Swansea, Wales. The company name is Welsh for "gifted". Its turnover grew rapidly, reaching £2 million in 2002, £8 million in 2003, £16.5 million in 2004, £31 million in 2005, £43 million in 2006 and £64 million in 2007. Afterwards turnover stabilised at around £60-70 million. Changes in its board of directors led to further growth with the company achieving a turnover of £135 million in 2011, peaking at £176 million in 2012. During this period the company was named the South Wales Evening Post Business of the Year and appeared in the Sunday Times Profit Track 100. In 2014 the company stated that almost half of its work was carried out overseas, through its subsidiary Dawnus International Ltd. It had a particularly large presence in West Africa providing infrastructure for mining operations; at this point it employed 250 expatriates and 1,000 locals in Sierra Leone. These works were affected by the 2014 Ebola outbreak, which resulted in losses of around £15 million.

In 2017 Dawnus reported losses on £1.4 million in its annual accounts and had no cash on hand. This reflected losses due to insolvent clients, legal costs and a dispute over a £7 million hotel contract in Poole, Dorset. Dawnus had incurred a 30-week delay in that contract when a high-voltage power cable was struck during piling works due to incorrect utilities drawings. In November 2018 the company bought back and cancelled 12,000 shares owned by its directors, a move that was investigated following the company's collapse. In December 2018 Dawnus sought fresh investment or a sale of the business. The company received interest from 23 potential investors and 52 buyers but only two of these made offers, one withdrawing soon afterwards and the remaining party withdrawing after carrying out due diligence.

Projects built by Dawnus include the £10 million Kingston College Creative Industries Centre (2015), refurbishment of the A548 Foryd Bridge in Rhyl (2015) and construction of the Tower Road Bridge at Alfred Dock in Birkenhead (2018).

== Collapse ==
Following further losses from a flood defence contract in Cardiff and in a Welsh government schools construction programme, Dawnus collapsed into administration in March 2019. Works immediately ceased on their projects from 12 March, which led to some traffic issues such as a roads scheme in Manchester where four excavators and a lorry were left blocking the highway. Other projects abandoned included three schools in Powys, Wales.

At the time of its collapse Dawnus owed around £70 million in unsecured debt, including £40.4 million to trade creditors, £5 million to employees and £3 million to Her Majesty's Revenue and Customs. A further £10 million was owed to secured creditors including around £1.5 million to the Welsh government and £1.3 million to Lloyds Bank. The Welsh Government claim stemmed from the outstanding capital on a £3.5 million loan it had made in 2016 to assist the company with cashflow problems.

The administrators, Grant Thornton, determined that Dawnus had around £16 million in assets at the time of its collapse and a further £21 million owed to them by debtors. While payments were made to the secured creditors by May 2020 the administrators did not anticipate being able to make any payments to unsecured creditors. Some unsecured creditors recouped money by stealing equipment belonging to Dawnus, removing trackers and disrupting traffic in the process. The collapse of Dawnus led to the loss of 700 jobs. Ken Skates, the Welsh Government's Minister for Economy, Transport and North Wales, stated that about 455 Welsh suppliers had been affected by the company's collapse and that around £6m was owed to businesses in its supply chain. The collapse, which has been compared with the collapse of construction business Carillion plc in 2018, led to calls for the Welsh government to extend its use of project bank accounts (whereby funds paid by the client are ringfenced and not given directly to the main contractor) to projects below the £2 million threshold adopted in 2018.
