= Star Fireworks =

Fireworks company

- Formerly: Bracknell Fireworks
- Industry: Fireworks
- Founded: 1971
- Headquarters: Bracknell, Berkshire, England
- Area served: United Kingdom
- Products: Professional firework displays and drone shows

Star Fireworks is a British company that stages professional fireworks displays and special effects for events. It specializes in providing choreographed firework sequences for film and television use. It was formed in 1971. It was known as Bracknell Fireworks until the name of the company was changed in 2005. Its main offices are in Bracknell, Berkshire.

== Awards ==
In 2013, Star Fireworks won the British Firework Championships Champion of Champions competition in Plymouth, Devon, in which previous winners from the past six years are invited to compete. The company was also crowned British Champions in 2010. In 2008, they won the British Firework Championships Northern heat in Salford, Greater Manchester and placed second in the main competition. The company has also won or been runner-up in various other UK firework competitions.

== Professional memberships and associations ==
Star Fireworks are members of the British Pyrotechnists Association (BPA). The company directors are Members of the Institute of Explosives Engineers.

== Representation of the UK fireworks industry ==
Company staff are noted for their heavy involvement in representing the UK professional fireworks display industry in the UK and in Europe. Andy Hubble, a director of Star Fireworks, has acted as a consultant and media representative to the British Government's former Department of Trade and Industry (DTI), on its firework safety campaign, from 1995 to 2005. He chaired the British Pyrotechnists Association from 2008 to 2010 and a second term from 2013 to 2016, with a third term from 2020 to 2023, sitting on various Government committees concerning professional fireworks and explosives safety and control in the UK. Andy has sat on the Council of the Institute of Explosives Engineers since 2016. He has represented UK interests as part of a multi-national team producing harmonized firework regulations across the EU sitting on the European Committee for Standardization (CEN) Technical Committee for Category 4 Fireworks (professional fireworks) and represented UK professional fireworks display interests in Brussels. He is also a regular columnist for Fireworks (magazine) magazine and the Journal of the Institute of Explosives Engineers.

Company director Andy Hubble has been the commentator for the British Firework Championships in Plmyouth since 2021.

In 2013 Star Fireworks took action when changes in the European Pyrotechnic Directive threatened their business and others with closure, gaining the support of local Member of Parliament (MP) Dr Phillip Lee and the Consumer Affairs Minister Jo Swinson MP who, with the industry, found a solution to the problem.

== Drone Shows ==
In 2023 the directors started a sister company called Star Symphony Drone Shows specialising in drone displays. The company provides drone shows throughout Europe including shows that combine fireworks and light show drones together.
