= Fantastic Fireworks =

British company that stages large-scale fireworks displays

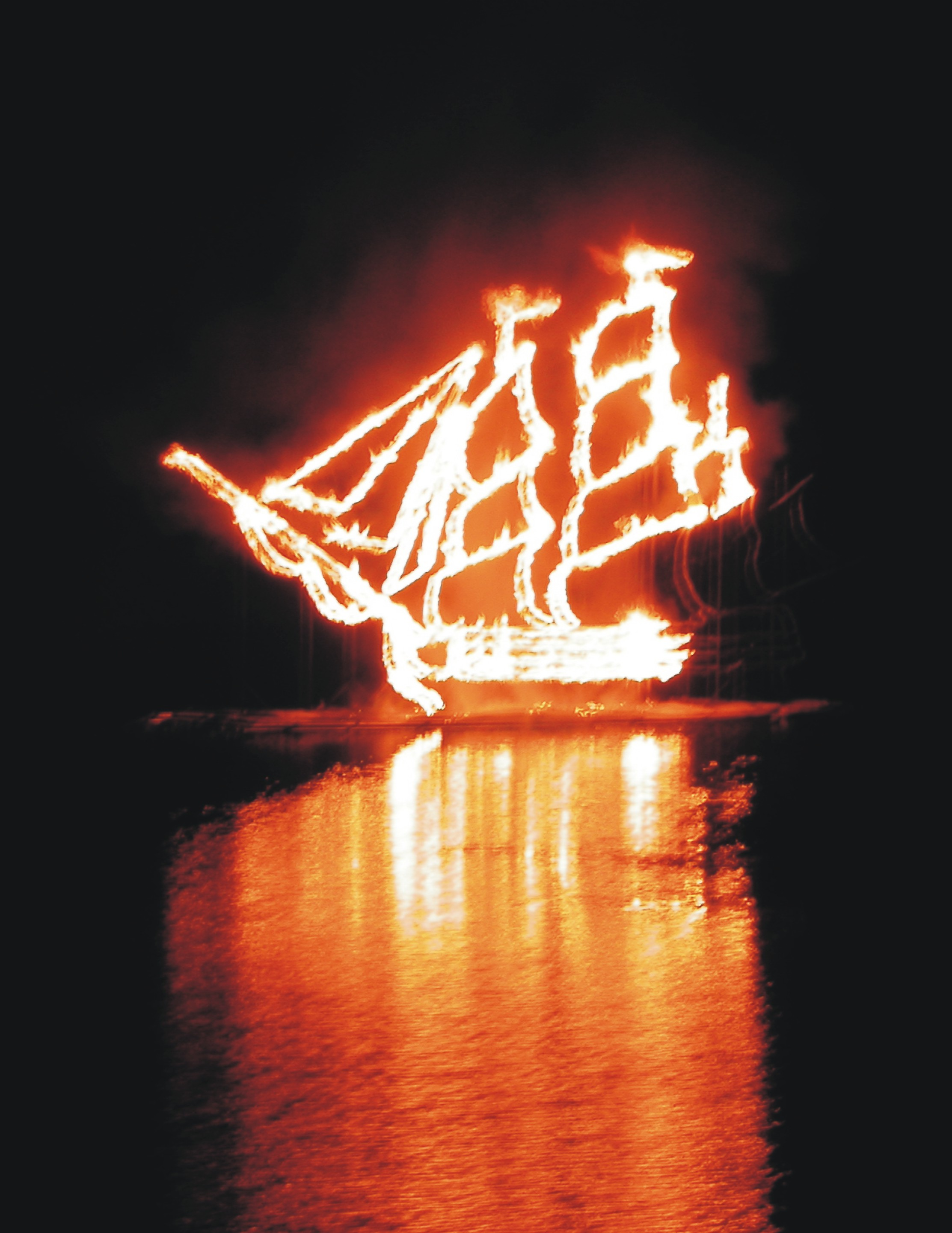
Fire sculpture created by Fantastic Fireworks to celebrate the 200th anniversary of the Battle of Trafalgar.

Fantastic Fireworks is a British fireworks company that stages party and wedding fireworks displays in UK and Europe. It was founded in 1985 and is based in Pepperstock. In 2025 it celebrated its 40th anniversary as the UK's longest established single owner fireworks company.

== Awards and recognitions ==
Fantastic Fireworks are twice winners of the British Fireworks Championship (1997 and 2015) and have been recognized for the quality of their fireworks displays. In 2006, they earned an entry in the Guinness World Records for a rocket launch in Plymouth, Devon that involved 56,645 rockets being set off in thirty seconds. In 1997, it was the first winner of the British Fireworks Championship. In 2015, the company won the title for a second time. Fantastic Fireworks has won the Best Visual Spectacular category of the Event Production Awards for its production of Jeff Wayne's Musical Version of The War of the Worlds.

== Fireworks Training School ==
Fantastic Fireworks set up and runs Britain's first Fireworks Training School. Offered are courses covering both domestic (Category 3) and professional (Category 4) fireworks. The latter include the British Pyrotechnists Association (BPA) Firer and Senior Firer qualification.

== Professional Memberships and Associations ==
Fantastic Fireworks is a member of the BPA (British Pyrotechnists Association).
