= Pusan Newport International Terminal =

Port in Busan, South Korea

Coordinates: 35°06′14″N 129°04′44″E

The logo

Pusan Newport International Terminal (PNIT) is a new port constructed in Busan, in South Korea; it is a joint venture between PSA International and Hanjin.

The port has three deepwater berths, 1.2 km of quay, and a capacity of 2 million TEU; it opened in March 2010.

The port is positioning itself as a trans-pacific transshipment hub.

== See also ==
- Busan Port Authority
