= Mount Batten =

Area of Plymouth, Devon

Coordinates: 50°21′34″N 4°07′47″W

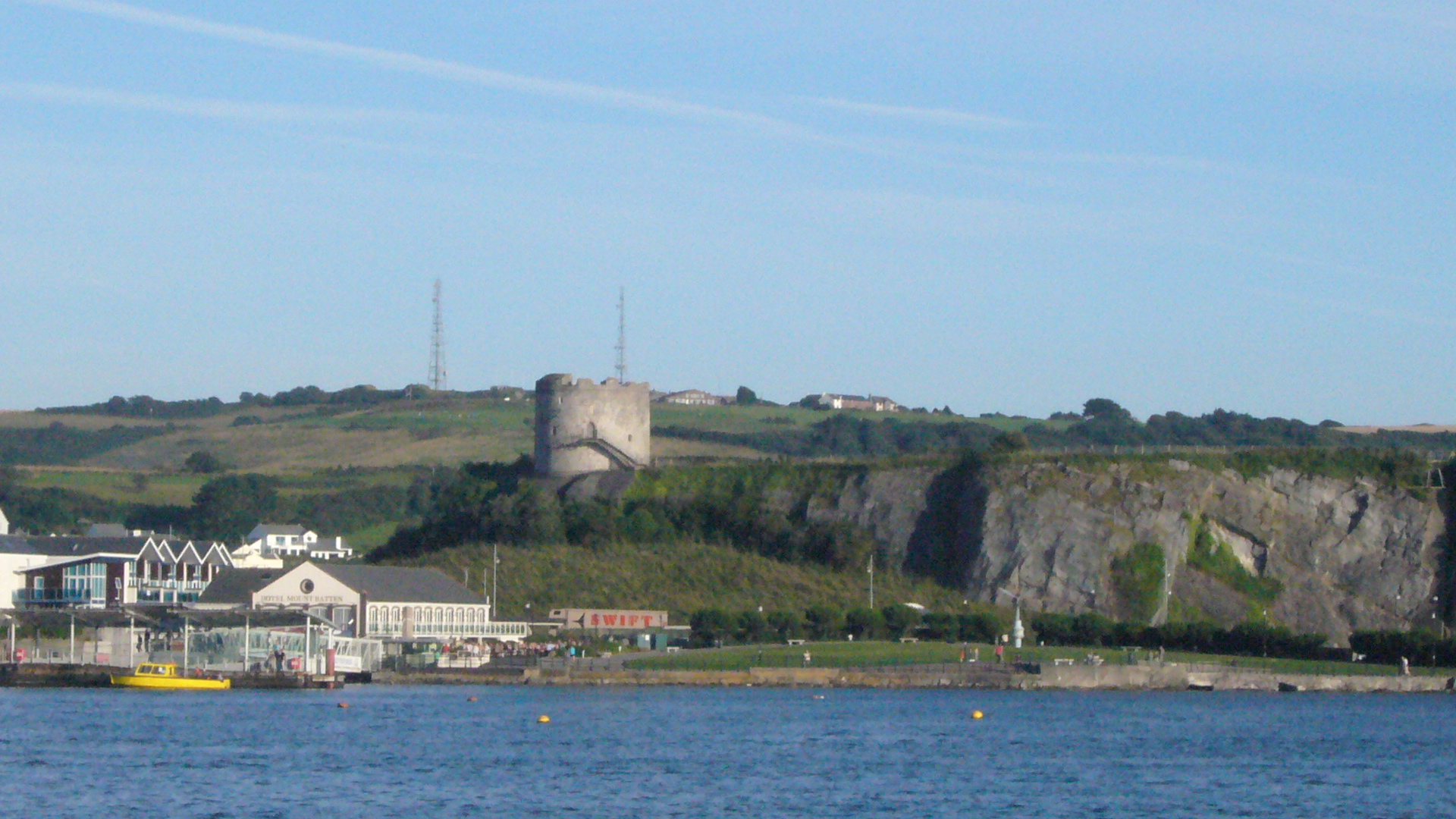
Mount Batten from Plymouth Hoe

Mount Batten is a 24-metre (79 ft)-tall outcrop of rock on a 600-metre (2,000 ft) peninsula in Plymouth Sound, Devon, England, named after Sir William Batten (c.1600–1667), MP and Surveyor of the Navy. It was previously called How Stert.

After some redevelopment which started with the area coming under the control of the Plymouth Development Corporation for five years from 1993, the peninsula now has a marina and centre for sea sport.

The Mount Batten Breakwater (also referred to as Cattewater Breakwater and, incorrectly, Mount Batten Pier) to the west doubles as a breakwater for the Cattewater and Sutton Harbour. It was built in 1881 by the Cattewater Commissioners and subsequently refurbished by the Plymouth Development Corporation opening formally in 1995. The unveiling of the plaque by opening of a temporary curtain during the 1995 re-opening ceremony was done so by 10-year-old Tim Fulfit, who was a pupil selected from the local Hooe Primary School.

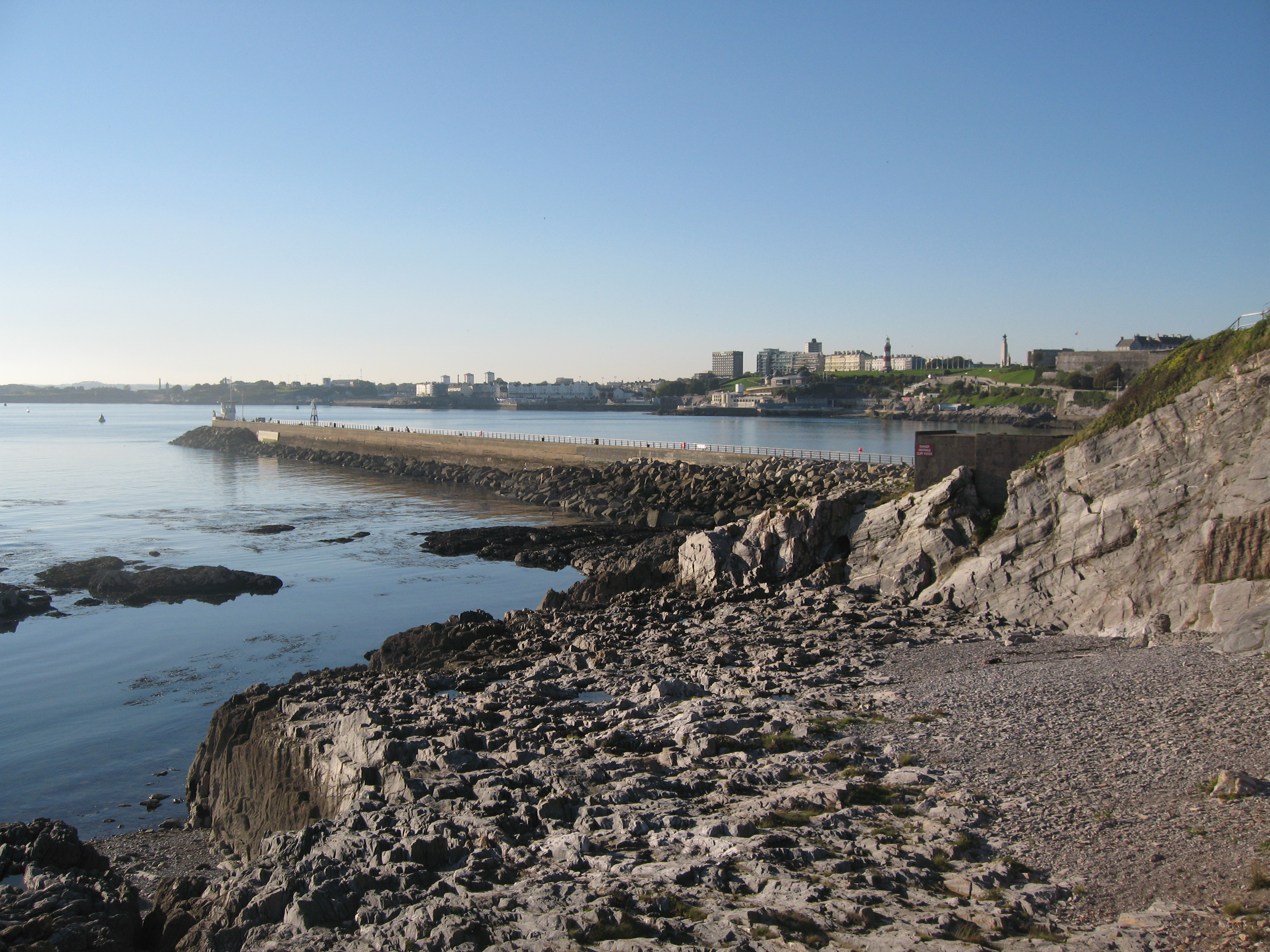
Mount Batten breakwater

== History ==
=== Early history ===
According to excavations reported by Barry Cunliffe in 1988, Mount Batten was the site of the earliest trade with Europe yet discovered in Bronze Age Britain, operating from the late Bronze Age, peaking in the late Iron Age Britain and continuing in operation throughout the Roman era. It appears to have been the primary route of entry to Bronze Age Britain for large quantities of continental commodities such as wine, and is therefore a speculative candidate for the trading centre of 'Ictis' reported by Diodorus Siculus and for the 'Tamaris' of Ptolemy's Geographia. Three fine British-made bronze mirrors were excavated on the peninsula, among many other ancient finds, but were lost in the Plymouth Blitz.

=== Coastal erosion ===
Before the Plymouth Breakwater was completed in 1841 and the Mount Batten Breakwater in 1881, the Mount Batten peninsula was subject to significant coastal erosion. In the 17th century, maintenance of the Cattewater required annual removal of silt and rubble which was dumped on the south side of Mount Batten. However, in 1633 and 1634 the Mount Batten isthmus was breached. A sea wall was built to resolve the problem but it wasn't until the breakwaters were built that the problem was finally solved.

=== Mount Batten Tower ===
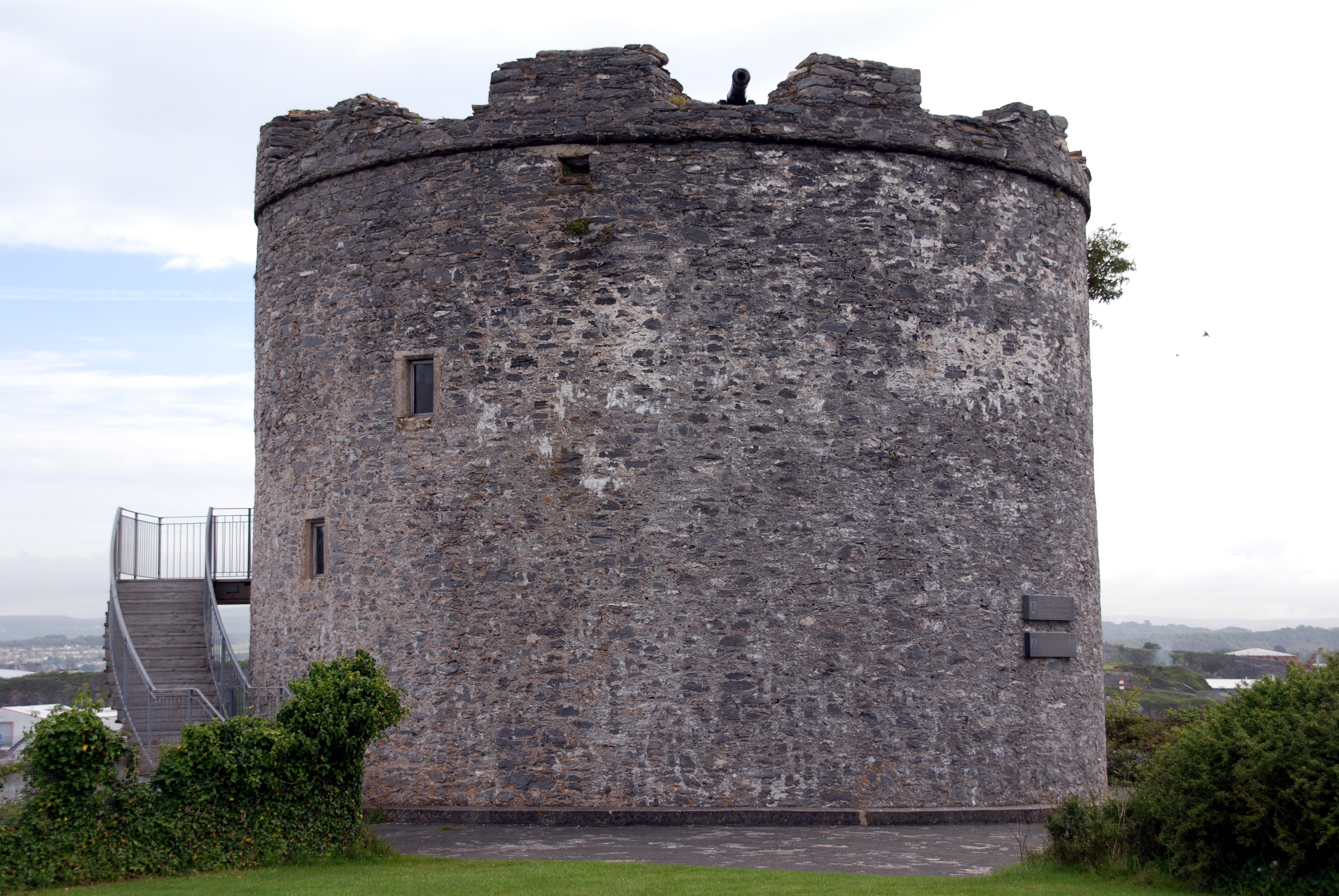
Mount Batten Tower

In the later Middle Ages, Mount Batten became an important defensive point for the developing settlement at Plymouth Harbour, providing a field of fire from across the other side of the Cattewater, the channel connecting the old town to the sea. In 1652, Mount Batten Tower, a circular artillery fort 30 feet (9 m) high, was built here. It is a Scheduled Ancient Monument.

=== Maritime incidents ===
In 1973, a short distance from Mount Batten, the Cattewater Wreck was discovered during dredging. Subsequent survey and excavation work indicated that the wreck was of a 200–300 ton merchantmen believed to have been lost in the early 16th Century. It has the distinction of being the first wreck to be protected under the Protection of Wrecks Act 1973. On 16 February 1811, the frigate HMS Amethyst wrecked on the ground near Cony Cliff Rocks, Mount Batten. Eight seamen lost their lives.

=== Quarrying at Mount Batten ===
There was extensive quarrying at Mount Batten between 1839 and the mid-1860s. Stones from the quarry were used for building steam yards at HMNB Devonport. The quarrying substantially changed the local landscape and threatened the Mount Batten Tower. Following a petition from 53 leading citizens to the Admiralty, Lord Morley, the landowner, imposed restrictions on quarrying thereby saving the tower.

=== Mount Batten Breakwater ===
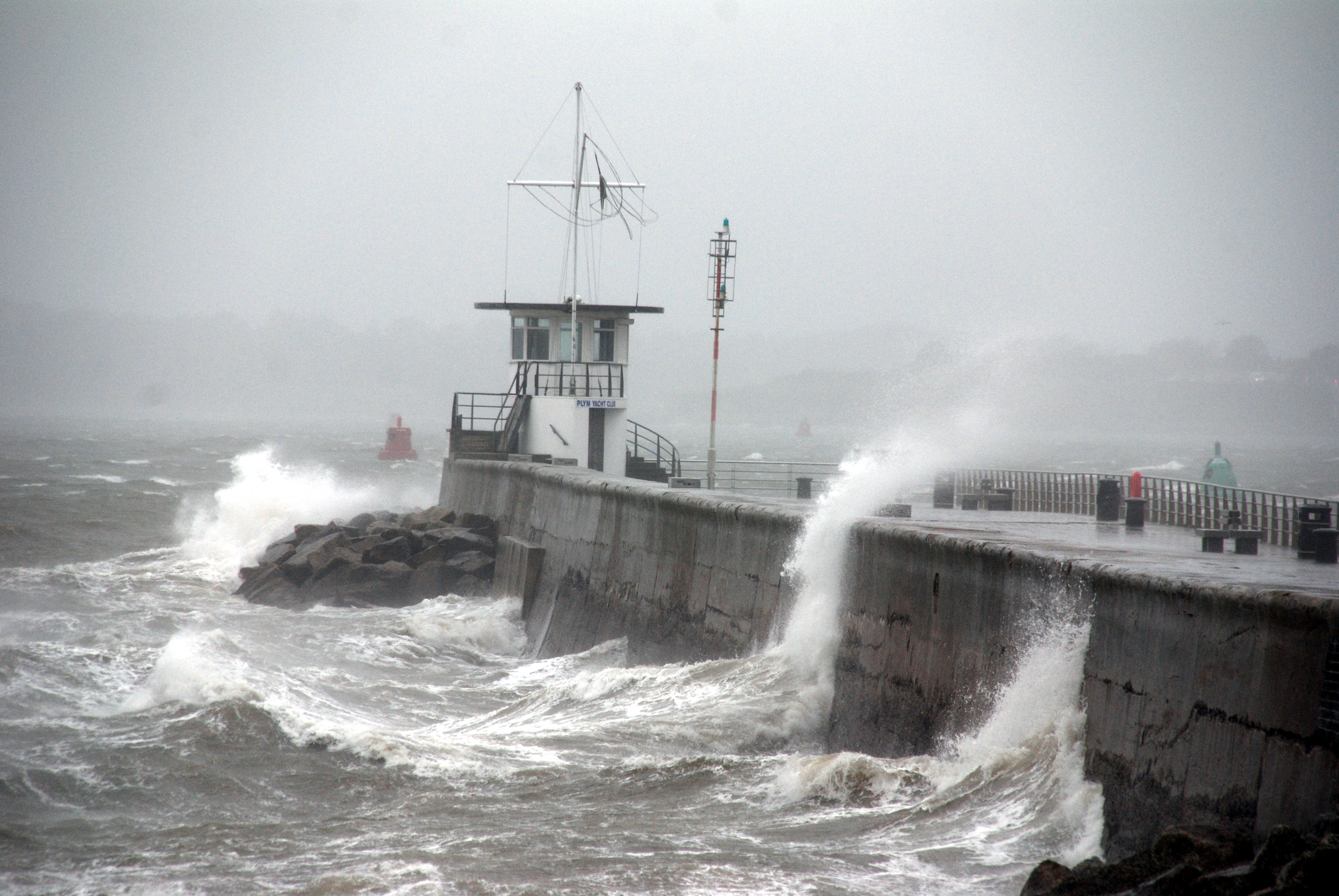
Mount Batten Breakwater during storm

Work on the Mount Batten Breakwater (also referred to as Mount Batten Pier and Cattewater Breakwater) started in 1878 and was completed in 1881 at a total cost of £20,000. It is 915 feet (279 m) long, and its foundations are 20 feet (6 m) below the low tide mark. The breakwater was promoted by the Cattewater Commissioners who were responsible for shipping in the area. During the air-station years the breakwater was closed to the public and used, for a period, to store flying boats. In 1995 the breakwater was refurbished and re-opened to the public.

The breakwater is a popular site for local anglers and for those watching ships using the Plymouth Sound. Boats in the Fastnet and Americas Cup, can also be viewed. In August each year, the breakwater is used for the British Firework Championships.

=== Early tourism ===
The coastal walk to Jennycliff and local inns, originally built to service those working on the quarries, helped make Mount Batten an increasingly popular destination for Plymothians. During one bank holiday in 1906, some 10,000 visitors took the ferry to the area. This fledgling tourist industry came to an abrupt end when the area was closed to the public.

=== The air-station years (1913–1986) ===
Seaplane trials first took place around Mount Batten as early as 1913 and an air-station was subsequently developed. A local commemorative display poster cites the following names and years for the air station:

- 1913–1918 as RNAS Cattewater
- 1918–1928 as RAF Cattewater
- 1928–1986 as RAF Mount Batten

Between 1917 and 1945, with some gaps, it was a flying boat base for both the Royal Air Force and the Royal Navy. The RAF operated search and rescue launches from the base. T. E. Lawrence was stationed there under the moniker Aircraftsman Shaw.

Shorts Sunderland flying boats of the Royal Australian Air Force operated from RAF Mount Batten during World War II, taking part in the Battle of the Atlantic. The RAF finally left in 1986.

=== Recent history ===
The former RAF Mount Batten site was transferred to the Plymouth Development Corporation in 1992.

In 1999, the Mount Batten Sailing and Watersports Centre opened on the site of the former sergeants' mess. The peninsula is also home to a small residential community with 22 houses, Spinnaker Quay, dating from 2001.

== Sources ==
- Hepper, David J. (1994). British Warship Losses in the Age of Sail, 1650-1859. Rotherfield: Jean Boudriot. ISBN 0-948864-30-3.
