= Plymouth Dome =

Former museum and tourist attraction in Devon, England

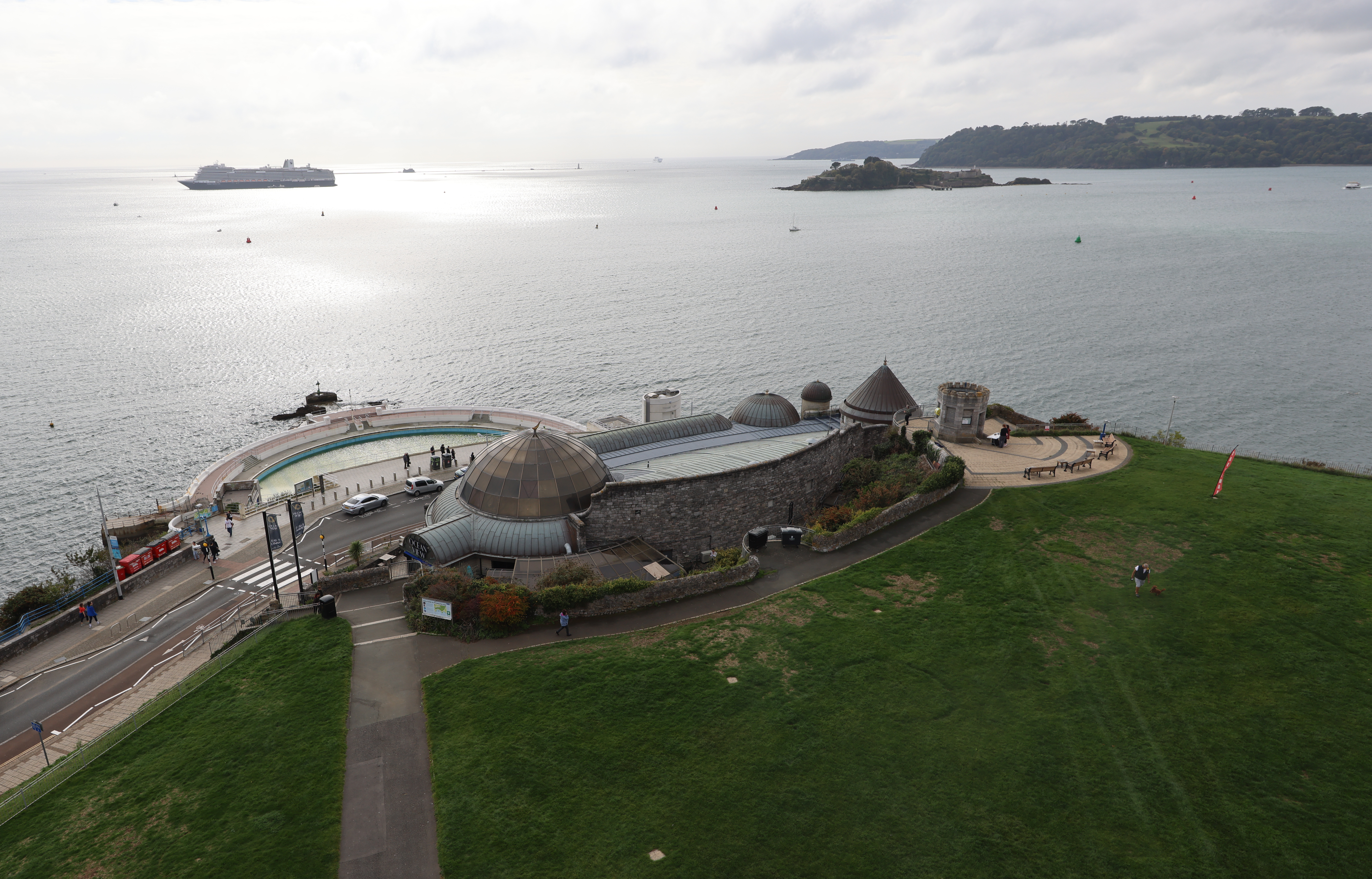
- Seen in 2022 as The Dome

- Location within Plymouth

General information
- Location: Plymouth Hoe, Plymouth, United Kingdom
- Coordinates: 50.36383°N 4.14203°W
- Current tenants: Inns of Cornwall and Devon
- Completed: 20 July 1988

Plymouth Dome is a restaurant which was a former museum and visitor attraction on Plymouth Hoe, Plymouth, Devon. The museum opened in 1989 and closed in 2006. The museum had a variety of themed galleries covering the history of Plymouth as well as two observation galleries overlooking Plymouth Sound. The current tenants opened Ocean View Bar and Dining at The Dome in 2021.

== History ==
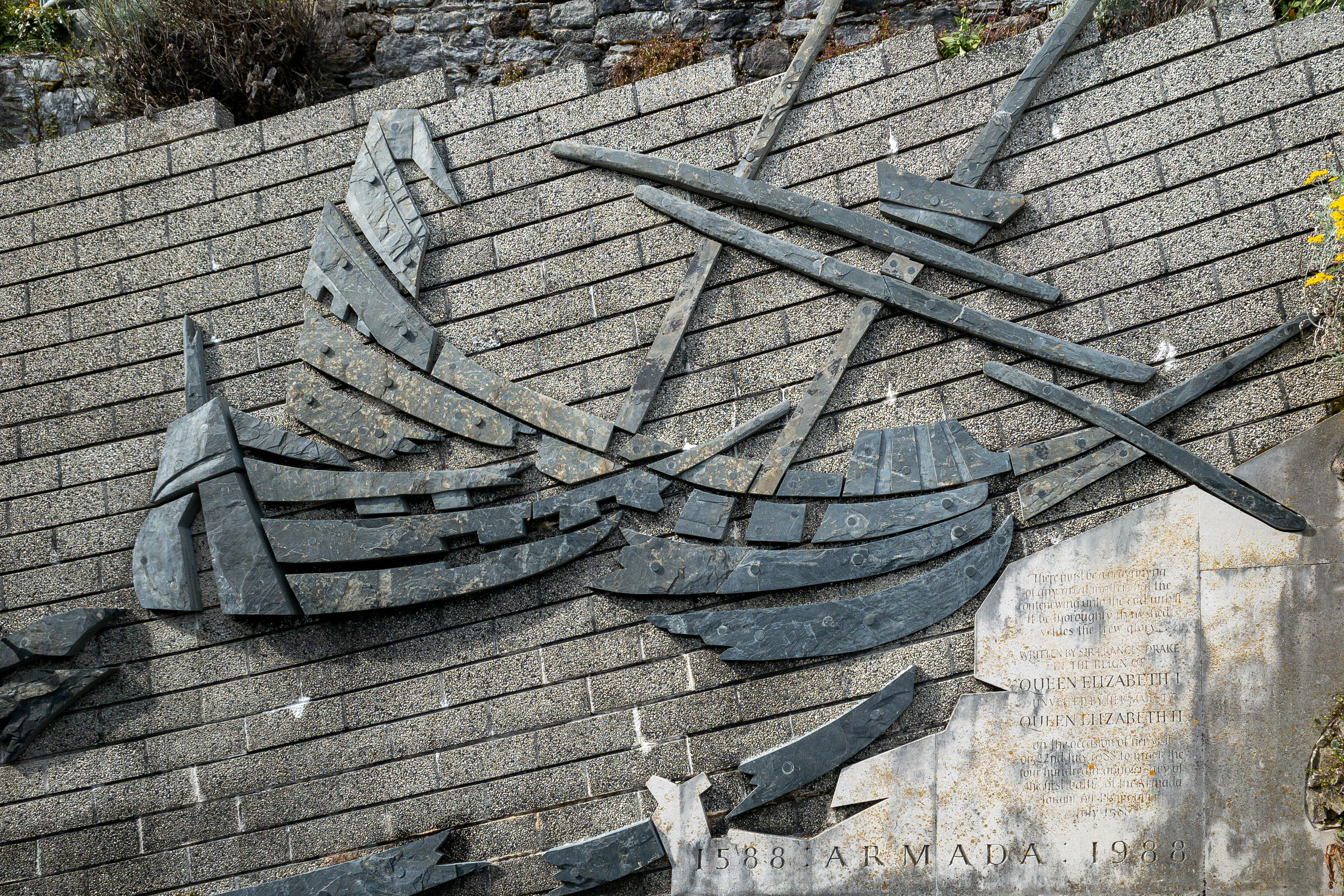
Plaque unveiled by Queen Elizabeth II on 20 July 1988 beside Plymouth Dome

=== Opening ===
Plymouth Dome was built in 1988, and although it was not opened to the public until 1989, Queen Elizabeth II visited the building on 20 July 1988, during which she unveiled a plaque to commemorate the 400th anniversary of the first battle of the Spanish Armada. An official opening followed in November by diplomat and academic Bryce Harland, the then-High Commissioner for New Zealand.

=== Lease to Wykeham Group ===
In 2004, it was revealed by The Independent that the museum attracted 60,000 visitors a year. However, in 2006, falling visitor numbers led Plymouth City Council to consider the attraction's future. In March, Plymouth City Council agreed to lease the building to the Wykeham Group, who were to invest £750,000 in creating a restaurant within an exhibition area in the building. However, the plans never came to fruition, and the Plymouth Dome subsequently closed.

=== Rhodes @ The Dome ===
The building remained empty for over five years. In late 2011, it was announced that celebrity chef Gary Rhodes intended to reopen it as a restaurant. Although originally due to open in late 2012, the £1.5 million restaurant Rhodes @ The Dome opened in January 2013. Rhodes ended his association with the restaurant in January 2016 and it was re-branded as "The Dome".
