= PS Guide =

History
- Name: 1869–1888: P.S. Guide; 1888–1897: S.S. Jubilant
- Operator: 1869–1872: Dartmouth Steam Packet Company; 1872–1875: West Cornwall Steam Ship Company; 1877–1883: Jackson and Ford of London and Milford; 1883–1888: Joseph Lawson of South Shields; 1888–1897: John and David Morris, Pelaw Main
- Port of registry: (United Kingdom)
- Builder: Havey and Company, Hayle
- Launched: 7 September 1869
- Out of service: 29 November 1897
- Fate: Lost in a gale

General characteristics
- Tonnage: 160 gross register tons (GRT)
- Length: 97.7 ft (29.8 m)
- Beam: 19.8 ft (6.0 m)
- Draught: 9 ft (2.7 m)
- Installed power: 70 hp
- Propulsion: Single cylinder steam engine.

PS Guide was a passenger vessel built for the Dartmouth Steam Packet Company in 1869.

== History ==
She was built by Harvey and Company of Hayle and launched on 7 September 1869 by Miss Alice Vincent. Her owners, the Dartmouth Steam Packet Company intended her as a powerful steam tug boat, and a passenger vessel for the summer trade in trips to the Channel Islands and France.

She was sold to the West Cornwall Steam Ship Company in 1872 when they lost both of their vessels and kept in service until 1875.

She was sold to Jackson and Ford of London and Milford in 1877, then Joseph Lawson of South Shields in 1883. In 1888 she was resold to John & David Morris, Pelaw Main and was reconstructed and converted to screw by Abbot & Co of Gateshead and renamed Jubilant. On 27 November 1897 it sailed from Maldon for the Tyne and its fate is unknown. In February 1898 it was assumed that the vessel was lost in the gale of 29 November 1897.
