= Plymouth Hoe =

Public space in Plymouth, England

Coordinates: 50°21′52″N 4°8′32″W

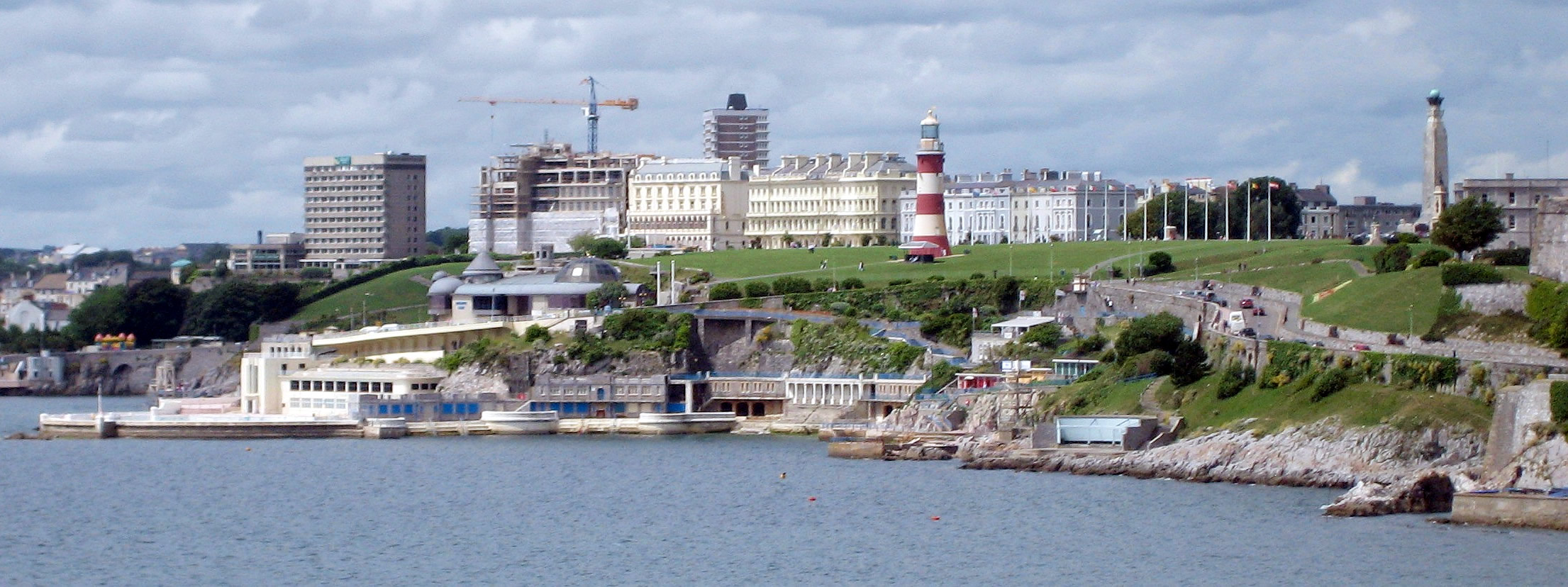
Plymouth Hoe from Mount Batten in 2006

Plymouth Hoe, referred to locally as The Hoe, is a large south-facing open public space in the English coastal city of Plymouth, Devon.

The Hoe is adjacent to and above the low limestone cliffs that form the seafront and commands views of Plymouth Sound, Drake's Island, and across the Hamoaze to Mount Edgcumbe in Cornwall. The name derives from the Anglo-Saxon word hoh, a sloping ridge shaped like an inverted foot and heel (a term that survives in a few other placenames, notably Sutton Hoo).

== History ==
John Lucas, sergeant, had 8d. for cutting Gogmagog.

— An audit book of 1514.

Until the early 17th century large outline images of the giants Gog and Magog (or Goemagot and Corineus) had for a long time been cut into the turf of the Hoe exposing the white limestone beneath. These figures were periodically re-cut and cleaned. No trace of them remains today, but this likely commemorates the Cornish foundation myth, being the point – Lam Goemagot, 'the Giant's Leap' – from which the Giant was cast into the sea by the hero Corineus.

Plymouth Hoe is perhaps best known for the probably apocryphal story that Sir Francis Drake played his famous game of bowls here in 1588 while waiting for the tide to change before sailing out with the English fleet to engage with the Spanish Armada. The British Library holds a 1591 Spry map of Plimmouth from this era.

A Tudor fortress guarded the neck of water between the eastern Hoe and Mount Batten and some sheer granite and limestone cannon points remain, however in the late 1660s, following The Restoration, a massive star-shaped stone fortress known as the Royal Citadel, was constructed to replace it. Its purpose was to protect the port and probably also to intimidate the townsfolk who had leaned towards Parliament during the Civil War. It remains occupied by the military.

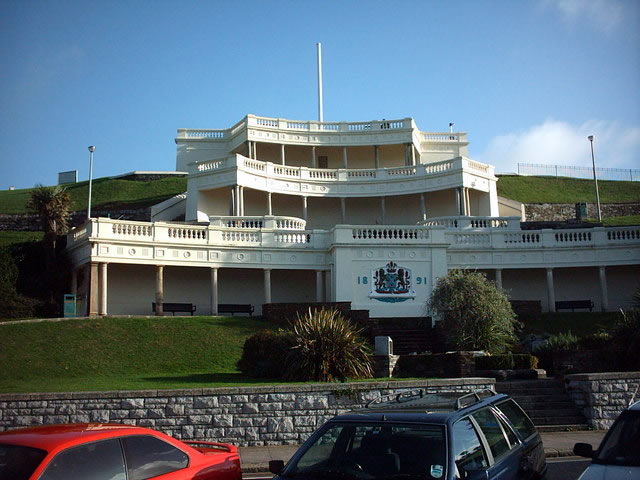
The Belvedere

From 1880 there was a popular bandstand on the Hoe. It was removed for scrap metal during the Second World War and never rebuilt. A three-tier belvedere built in 1891 survives; it was built on the site of a camera obscura, probably built in the 1830s, which showed views of the harbour. Below this site was the Bull Ring (now a memorial garden), and a grand pleasure pier, started in 1880, which provided a dance hall, refreshments, promenading and a landing place for boat trips. The pier was destroyed by German bombing in World War II.

There is an imposing series of Victorian terraces to the west of the naval memorial which previously continued to the Grand Hotel and, until it was destroyed by bombing, the grand clubhouse of the Royal Western Yacht Club. The club then merged with the Royal Southern and occupied that club's older premises which it had created from the regency public steam baths by the basin at West Hoe before the rejuvenated club moved in the late 1980s to Queen Anne Battery.

== Landmarks ==
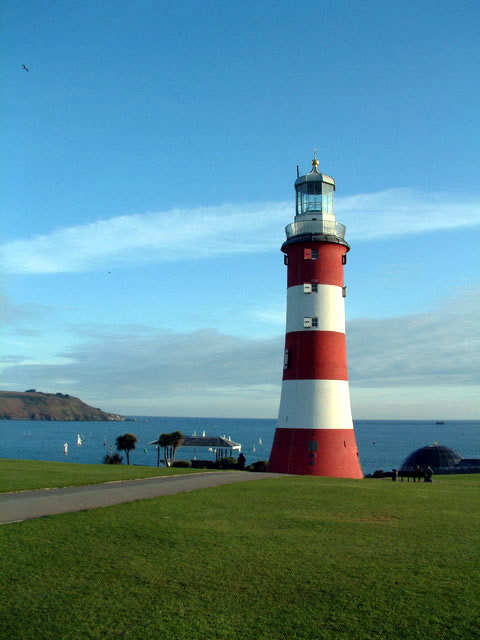
Smeaton's Tower, as re-erected on Plymouth Hoe

A prominent landmark on the Hoe is Smeaton's Tower. This is the upper portion of John Smeaton's Eddystone Lighthouse, which was originally built on the Eddystone Rocks, located 14 miles (22.5 km) to the south, in 1759. It was dismantled in 1882 and moved, stone by stone, to the Hoe where it was re-erected.

Smeaton's Tower overlooks Tinside Lido, a 1930s outdoor pool or lido which sits upon the limestone shoreline at the base of the cliff. Most of the works to create the swimming areas and Madeira Road were carried out to make work for the local unemployed during the Depression.

A statue of Sir Francis Drake by Joseph Boehm (a copy of the original in his home town of Tavistock) was placed here in 1884 to commemorate him. There are also several war memorials along the northern side of the Hoe. The largest commemorates the Royal Naval dead of the two world wars; its central obelisk is by Robert Lorimer and was unveiled in 1924, while the surrounding sunken garden was added by Edward Maufe in 1954. The Armada Memorial was opened in 1888 to celebrate the tercentenary of the Spanish Armada.

The Hoe also includes a long broad tarmacked promenade (currently a disabled motorists' car park) which serves as a spectacular military parade ground and which is often used for displays by Plymouth-based Royal Navy, Royal Marines, the Army garrison, as well as for travelling funfairs and open-air concerts.

Set into the shape of the southern sea facing fortifications of the Royal Citadel is the Citadel Hill Laboratory of the Marine Biological Association of the UK, which also houses the Sir Alister Hardy Foundation for Ocean Science. Below and to the east, perched on the rocky foreshore is the clubhouse of the Royal Plymouth Corinthian Yacht Club.

== Tourism ==
The Hoe is a popular area for Plymothians and visitors. There is always a great deal of activity on the water, including frequent warship movements, ferries going and coming from France and Spain, fishing trawlers and a swarm of larger and smaller sailing boats. The Fastnet yacht race ends here. The annual two-day British Firework Championships attracts tens of thousands of spectators.

For forty years, there has been controversy about development on the edges of the Hoe green space. The erection of two discount hotel chain buildings, one at the southern end of Armada Way and the other at the Sound end of Leigham Street, contrast with their Victorian surroundings. The former Grand Hotel has been converted into apartments and the long derelict yacht club site has now been filled by a modern block of flats.

The Plymouth Dome, a turreted and domed building, built into a small old quarry site above Tinside as an historical theme tourist attraction, failed to obtain sufficient funding and closed in 2006, despite having been visited by 2.3 million people. Between 2013 and 2016 it was a restaurant owned by celebrity chef Gary Rhodes.

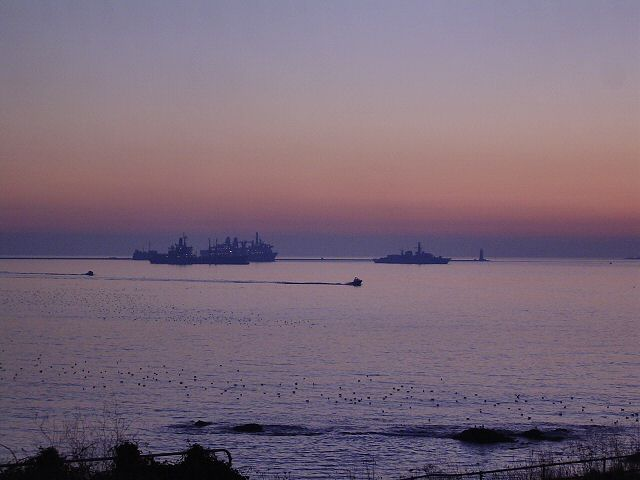
The view from the Hoe at sunset, showing Plymouth Sound and the Breakwater

== Tombstoning ==
In the early 21st century Plymouth Hoe became notorious for the practice of tombstoning, which involves leaping feet-first into the sea from any accessible high point. This caused a number of serious injuries and deaths, leading to the dismantling of seafront diving boards and closure of parts of the waterfront to discourage the activity.

== See also ==
- Hooe, Plymouth, a small suburb of Plymstock located beside Hooe Lake.
