= Dittisham Princess =

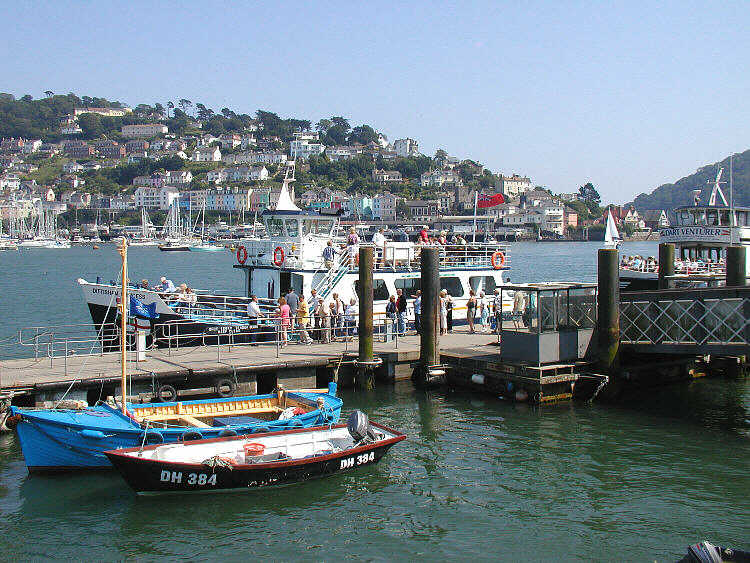
- MV Dittisham Princess alongside Dartmouth Town Pontoon in River Link colours

History

United Kingdom
- Name: Dittisham Princess
- Namesake: Dittisham
- Owner: GH Riddalls & Sons (1995); Dart Pleasure Craft (2000)
- Route: River Dart (1995)
- Launched: 1995
- Home port: Dartmouth
- Status: In active service

General characteristics
- Type: Twin-screw motor vessel
- Length: 70 ft (21 m) LOA
- Decks: 2
- Propulsion: Twin Gardner 6LX diesel engines
- Capacity: 181 passengers

MV Dittisham Princess is a twin screw passenger vessel, operating on the River Dart in South Devon, England. She is mainly used for the Western Lady Ferry in Torbay, as well as charters, winter services and as a relief vessel, on the cruise/ferry route between Dartmouth and Totnes, and on circular cruises from Dartmouth, for Dart Pleasure Craft.

== Design ==
Dittisham Princess is a steel twin-deck passenger vessel. The main deck is flush, with a short raised foredeck to provide additional seaworthiness. There is a fully enclosed saloon with bar and toilets on the main deck, with a large open deck on the upper deck along with the wheelhouse, accessed by external stairways both forward and aft. There are further open passenger decks forward and aft on the main deck. Her twin Gardner engines are located in the hull underneath the bar area of the passenger accommodation.

== History ==
She was built for GH Riddalls & Sons in 1995 to replace the MV Dartmothian. In 2000 the Riddalls fleet was bought by Dart Pleasure Craft and she was transferred to their fleet, with her former red hull painted blue. She is the newest vessel in the Dartmouth Riverboats fleet, and primarily works the Western Lady ferry service in Torbay. In the winter months, she typically works winter Harbour Cruises in Dartmouth, due to her fully enclosed saloon area.

== Livery ==
When built the Diitisham Princess appeared in 'Red Cruisers' livery, of red hull, white boot topping, green anti-fouling and white superstructure. She now is painted in 'Dartmouth Riverboats' livery of dark blue hull, white boot topping, red antifouling, and white superstructure with the words 'Western Lady Ferry' in yellow. Riddalls tried various combinations of red and white for the raised bow section. It is now mainly white, with the blue paint raised slightly from the level of the main deck.
