= Cremyll Ferry =

Ferry route in England

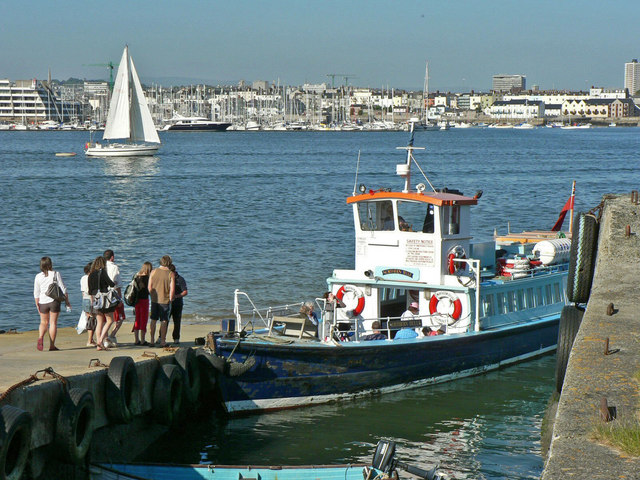
The Cremyll Ferry

The Cremyll Ferry is a foot passenger ferry across the Hamoaze (the estuary of the River Tamar) from Admirals Hard in Stonehouse, Plymouth, Devon to Cremyll in Cornwall. It is operated by Plymouth Boat Trips, and runs approximately every 30 minutes, with an 8-minute crossing time.

== History ==
The ancient ferry route dates back to at least the 11th century. For hundreds of years the route was worked with rowboats, and with horseboats for carrying livestock, carts and cargo. In 1511 the Mount Edgecumbe family took control of the ferry; they would keep control for over 400 years.

The original crossing was from Devil's Point to Barnpool. The route from there on the Cornish side took travellers close to the eventual site of Mt Edgcumbe House and then by a path still deeply cut into the hillside leading to the north side of Maker Church. The inconvenience of this route to the Edgcumbes was met by shifting the western terminal of the ferry to Cremyll about 1730. It would be reasonable to suppose that the road continued then as now to the westward outside the park. For the attendant effect on West Stonehouse, see below. When the Royal William Yard was built the eastern terminal was moved from Devil‟s Point to Admiral‟s Hard.

The Cremyll passage was arduous and dangerous by reason of the current in the days of oar and sail. Cecilia Fiennes in her “Journey to Cornwall 1698” says:

“From Plymouth I went one mile to Crilby Ferry which is a very hazardous crossing passage by reason of three tides meeting. Had I known the danger before, I would not have been very willing to have gone it, not but this is the constant way most people goe and saves several miles riding. I was at least an hour going over and it was about a mile, but indeed in some places, notwithstanding there was 5 men rowed and I set my own men to row also, I do believe that we made almost not a step of the way for a quarter of an hour, but blessed by God I came safely over; but those ferry boats are so wet and the sea is always so cold to be upon that I never fail to catch cold in a ferry boat as I did this day, having two more ferries to cross, tho‟ none so bad or half so long as this. Thence to Millbrook, 2 miles, and went all along by the water and had the full view of the dockyards”.

In 1885 the first steam ferry was introduced, followed by a further six steam launches, culminating in the long running vessels, the second SS Armadillo and SS Shuttlecock which were introduced in 1924 and 1926.

In 1945 the ferry was taken over by the Millbrook Steamboat & Trading Co Ltd, who rebuilt both of the ferries as motor vessels, renaming the SS Armadillo MV Northern Belle, which continued on the Cremyll Ferry route. The SS Shuttlecock was renamed MV Southern Belle, and was used on excursions. During the Millbrook company period many of the other vessels of their fleet were used as relief vessels to the MV Northern Belle.

In 1985 the Millbrook company withdrew from the Tamar, and the Cremyll Ferry was transferred to Tamar Cruising, who also bought the MV Northern Belle and the MV Queen Boadicea II from Dart Pleasure Craft Ltd, the former parent of the Millbrook Company. Tamar Cruising built two new vessels for cruising from the Mayflower Steps in Plymouth: the MV Plymouth Sound and the MV Plymouth Sound II, though the latter vessel was sold in 1996. The MV Queen Boadicea II was sold in 1991. The fleet was increased to three again in 1998 with the purchase of MV Tamar Belle, formerly the MV Look Ahead II. She was replaced by the MV Queen of Helford in 2004, which also took the name Tamar Belle. All of these vessels were and are mainly used for cruising and providing relief services on the ferry. MV Northern Belle continues as the main ferry, after 85 years in service.

The ferry was operated by Tamar Cruising from 1985 to 2017. In 2008 Plymouth City Council decided to retender the crossing, and Tamar Cruising lost the contract to rivals Sound Cruising, who refurbished Plymouth Belle for the job. Just days before the operation was due to transfer to the new operator, Plymouth City Council announced that Tamar Cruising would continue to run it while an investigation took place into the fairness of awarding the tender to Sound Cruising. Eventually Tamar Cruising won the right to retain the crossing, and was awarded a new seven-year contract starting in June 2010, using a newly overhauled Northern Belle.

The company used Tamar Belle as the reserve vessel on the crossing. The new tender involved a recast clockface timetable, with boats running every half-hour. Additional sailings were added in the evenings, and the enhanced summer timetable was altered to begin earlier, and end later in the season. Fares were also reduced. Tamar Cruising were awarded the right to run the Cremyll Ferry until June 2017.

In 2013, the MV Northern Belle was badly damaged in a collision with a Royal Navy landing craft and was permanently taken out of service. It was replaced by the return of the Edgcumbe Belle which is still in service as the regular ferry, under the current operator Plymouth Boat Trips.

== Current service ==
The Cremyll Ferry was taken over by Plymouth Boat Trips in 2017. It continues to run its popular service using the MV Edgcumbe Belle, with backup ferry vessels MV Island Princess, MV Tamar Belle (II), MV Plymouth Sound and MV Plymouth Princess (II).

The MV Edgcumbe Belle continues to run the daytime service year round, operating for around 12 hours a day before handing over to the MV Tamar Belle (II) in the evening during the summer months. The extended summer running times mean that the ancient ferry route is now available up to nearly 16 hours a day during peak season - completing up to 60 daily crossings between the 2 regular service vessels.

== Fleet list ==
=== Steam period ===
Name	Built	Company service	Notes
SS Dodo	1884	1885 - 1910?	
SS Ferryboat	1883	1884?- 1907	
SS Shuttlecock (I)	1885	1885–1910	
SS Armadillo (I)	1886	1886–1924	
SS Carrier (I)	1889?	1889–1927	
SS Shuttlecock (II)	1924	1924–1946	Converted to the MV Southern Belle in 1946
SS Armadillo (II)	1926	1926–1946	Converted to the MV Northern Belle in 1947

=== Millbrook Steamboat & Trading Company period ===
MV Northern Belle	1926	1946–1985	Converted from the Armadillo, regular ferry
MV Tamar Belle	1927	1946–1959	Relief ferry
MV Lady Elizabeth	1924	1946–1979	Relief ferry
MV Eastern Belle	1946	1957–1985	Relief ferry
MV Edgcumbe Belle	1957	1979–1985	Relief ferry

=== Tamar Cruising period ===
MV Edgcumbe Belle	1957	2013–2017	Regular ferry
MV Northern Belle	1926	1985–2013	Regular ferry
MV Queen Boadicea II	1936	1985–1991	Excursions and relief ferry
MV Plymouth Sound	1987	1987–2017	Excursions and relief ferry
MV Plymouth Sound II	1990	1990–1996	Excursions
MV Tamar Belle (I)	1960	1998–2004	Excursions and relief ferry, formerly MV Look Ahead II
MV Tamar Belle (II)	1960	2004 – 2017	Excursions and relief ferry, formerly MV Queen of Helford

=== Plymouth Boat Trips (Current Operator) ===
MV "Edgcumbe Belle"	1957	2017–present	Regular daytime ferry, Formerly MV "Humphrey Gilbert", built by British rail for dartmouth foot ferry. Along with sister ship MV "Adrian Gilbert".
MV Plymouth Sound	1987	2017–present	Excursions and relief ferry
MV Island Princess	1961	2017–Present	Royal Willam Yard to Saltash Ferry during daytime and backup for Cremyll Ferry
MV Tamar Belle (II)	1960	2022 – present	Royal Willam Yard ferry during daytime, Summer Cremyll ferry in evenings and Backup boat for main ferry, formerly MV Queen of Helford
MV Plymouth Princess (II)	1997	2019 – present	Full Time summer Cawsand Ferry and occasional Backup boat for Cremyll Ferry, formerly MV Rivermaid Kingsbridge to Salcombe Ferry.

== See also ==
- Torpoint Ferry
