= MV Lady Wakefield =

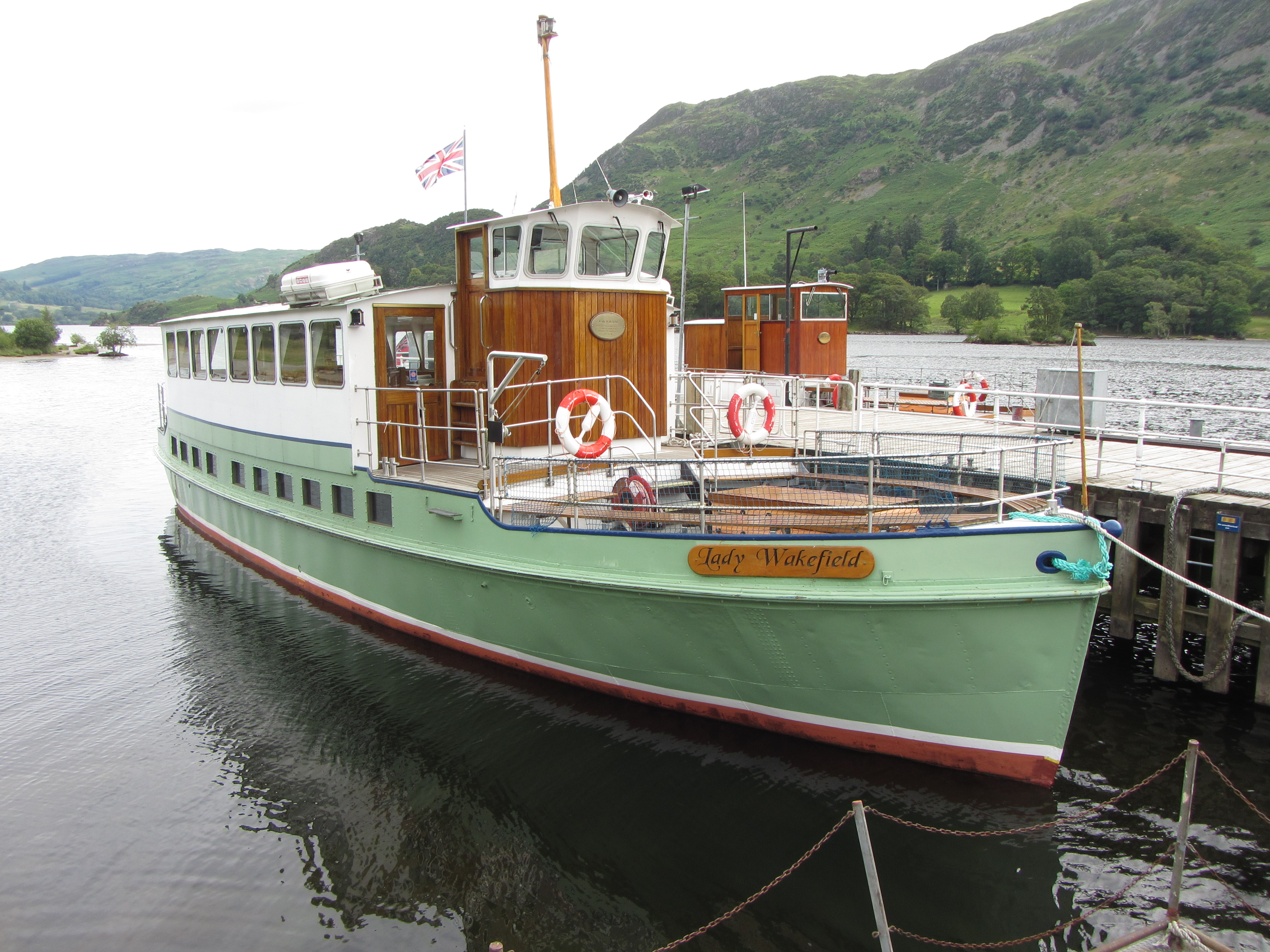

History

United Kingdom
- Name: Berry Castle; Golden Cormorant; Totnes Castle; Lady Wakefield
- Namesake: Berry Pomeroy Castle
- Owner: River Dart Steamboat Co Ltd (1949); Discover Galapagos Ltd (1972); Dart Pleasure Craft Ltd (1976); Plymouth Boat Cruises (1985); Ullswater 'Steamers' (2006)
- Route: River Dart (1949); Various (1972); River Dart (1977); Plymouth (1985); Ullswater (2006)
- Builder: Philip and Son, Dartmouth, Devon
- Launched: 1949
- Status: Operating on Ullswater

General characteristics
- Type: Twin-screw motor vessel
- Tonnage: 50 GT
- Length: 67 ft (20 m) LOA
- Beam: 16.5 ft (5.0 m)
- Depth: 5.5 ft (1.7 m)
- Decks: 2
- Propulsion: Diesel
- Capacity: 150 passengers

MV Lady Wakefield is a twin screw passenger vessel, operating between Glenridding, Howtown and Pooley Bridge on Ullswater in the Lake District for Ullswater Navigation and Transit Co, marketed as Ullswater 'Steamers'.

== History ==
The ship was built in 1949 by Philip & Son of Dartmouth, Devon, United Kingdom as the MV Berry Castle for the River Dart Steamboat Co Ltd (RDSC). She was named after Berry Pomeroy Castle, which is located a few miles from the River Dart and was the third vessel in the fleet to bear the name. MV Berry Castle was used on the company's River Dart services from Dartmouth and Totnes in South Devon. In 1972 she was sold to Discover Galapagos Ltd, to be fitted out for diving in Honduras. This project failed and she was operated on the Medway by Discover Galapagos as the MV Golden Cormorant. In 1976 she returned to the Dart, owned by the RDSC's successor: Dart Pleasure Craft Ltd, and was renamed MV Totnes Castle.

In 1985 Dart Pleasure Craft, which had previously bought the Millbrook Steamboat & Trading Co Ltd of Plymouth, withdrew its services from the Plymouth area, and in the process, MV Totnes Castle was sold to Plymouth Boat Cruises. She operated cruises from Plymouth. During her time in Plymouth she gained additional enclosed accommodation in the form of a large deckhouse on the former open deck behind her wheelhouse. In 2006 she was sold to Ullswater Navigation and Transit Company, and moved to Ullswater, involving an overland journey to this land-locked lake. She was renamed MV Lady Wakefield.

On 6 December 2015 Lady Wakefield suffered damage while moored at Pooley Bridge pier during Storm Desmond. She started to take on water, and was rescued by being run aground the following day. On 12 May 2016, MV Lady Wakefield was rolled back into the water after being beached for five months, and docked for repair.

== Gallery ==
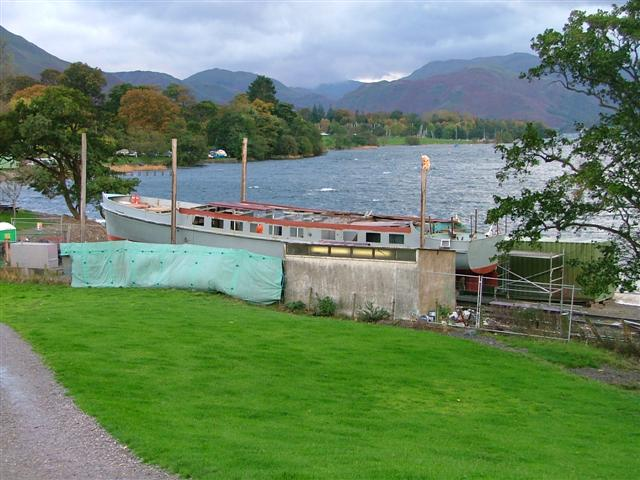
Lady Wakefield before entering Ullswater service

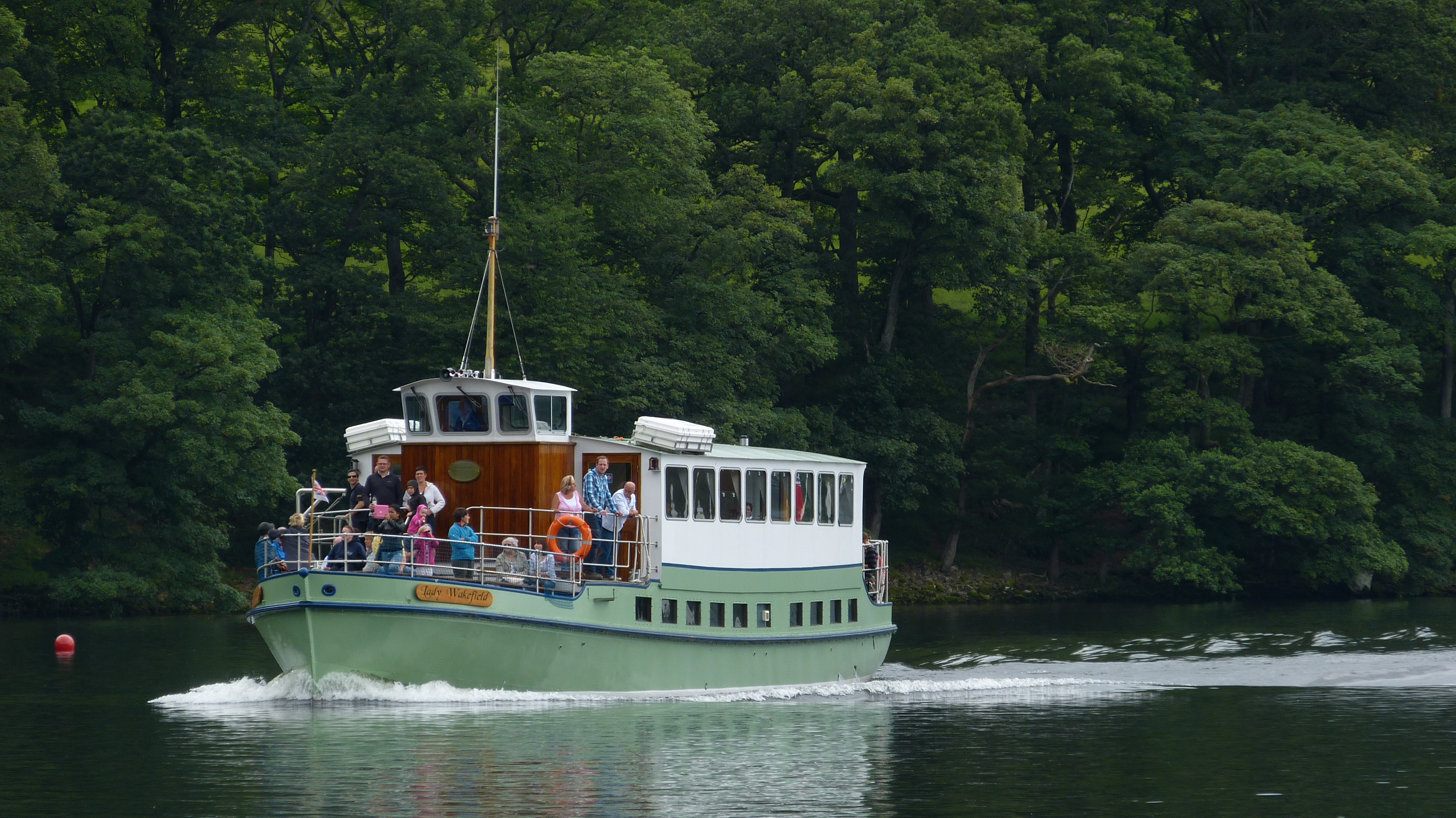
Lady Wakefield approaching Howtown

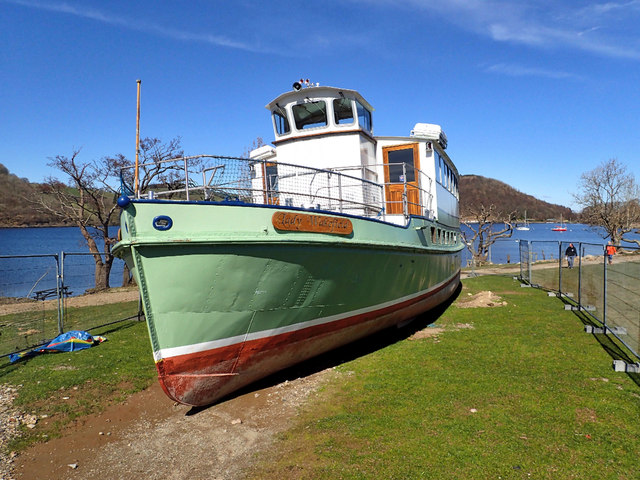
Lady Wakefield beached by Storm Desmond
