= River Dart Steamboat Co =

Ferry and excursion boat operators

River Dart Steamboat Company Limited
- Type: Private
- Industry: Transport
- Predecessor: Dartmouth & Torbay Steam Packet Co. Ltd
- Founded: Dartmouth, Devon, United Kingdom (1906)
- Founder: Charles Seale Hayne
- Defunct: 1976
- Fate: Renamed River Dart Boat and Leisure Co. Ltd
- Successor: River Dart Boat & Leisure Co. Limited
- Headquarters: Dartmouth, Devon, United Kingdom
- Area served: South Devon
- Products: River Dart ferry services
- Parent: Evans & Reid Investment Co Ltd (1952–1976)
- Subsidiaries: Devon Star Shipping Co Ltd (1961–1964)

The River Dart Steamboat Co Ltd (RDSC) and its predecessors, the Dartmouth Steam Packet Company and the Dartmouth and Torbay Steam Packet Company, were the major ferry and excursion boat operators on the River Dart in South Devon for 120 years, until the company's demise in 1976. The company was famous for its distinctive paddle steamers, which were a familiar sight on the river until the late 1960s.

== Routes ==
The diagram on the right illustrates the network of routes operated by the company and its predecessors.

=== Dartmouth–Totnes ===
The premier route of the company, this route operated year-round until 1929, thereafter being a summer only service. This route was around 10 miles long, and the journey time was an average of 75 minutes, though journey times of less than an hour were possible before the introduction of a 6 knot speed limit. Calls were made en route at Dittisham Pier, and off Duncannon, where passengers for Stoke Gabriel and Cornworthy embarked by small rowing boat. Totnes is tidal, and so the ferry could only run at high tide. In its early years the service was a true ferry, connecting Dartmouth with the markets and main line station at Totnes, and carried mail until 1929. As the years went by, it became more of a tourist cruise service.

=== Other routes ===
From time to time the company experimented with operating other ferry services. These either closed, or were taken over by other operators.

==== Dartmouth–Greenway ====
For the brief period between the Dartmouth and Torbay Railway reaching Brixham Road Station in 1861 and Kingswear in 1864, a regular connecting ferry service was run four times per day between Dartmouth and Greenway Quay, where the steamers were met with a horse-drawn omnibus to the station at Brixham Road.

==== Dartmouth–Kingswear ====
On 16 August 1864 the Dartmouth and Torbay Railway reached Kingswear, across the river from Dartmouth. The Act of Parliament incorporating the railway gave the railway company the right to operate the ferry to Dartmouth. The route was a short 5 minute crossing; from the pontoon adjacent to Kingswear station, to Dartmouth Pontoon, where an unusual station was built, with ticket office and porters, but no track. Initially the ferry was leased to the Dartmouth Steam Packet Company, who built the PS Newcomin and the doubled ended PS Dolphin for the route. In 1901, the Great Western Railway (GWR) took over the running of the Kingswear Ferry, and purchased the Dolphin. As the GWR only owned one passenger vessel on the Dart, relief steamers continued to be provided by the River Dart Steamboat Company until 1957

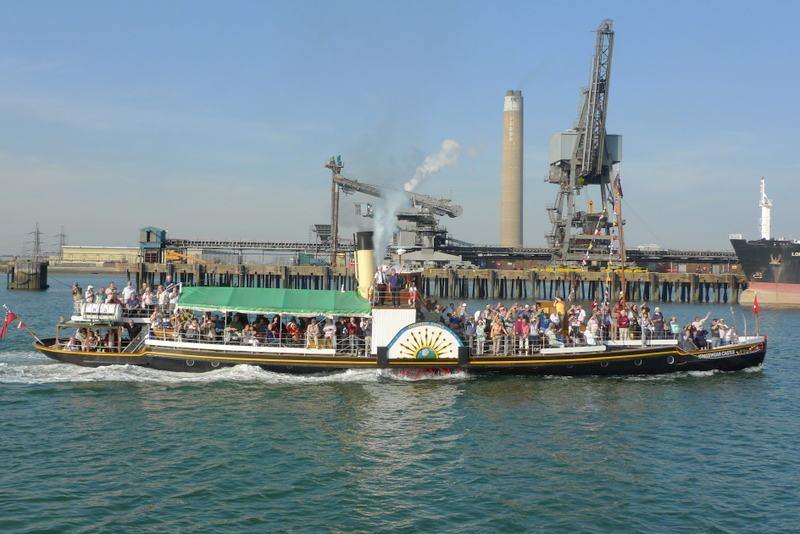
PS Kingswear Castle, the last remaining operational RDSC steamer, in service from Chatham

==== Dittisham–Greenway ====
This short route across the Dart was operated by local boatmen for most of it history, but the River Dart Steamboat Company operated it during the Second World War.

==== Coastal and cross-channel routes ====
In the early years of the company, attempts were made to run long distance excursions from Dartmouth, to the Channel Islands, St Malo, Weymouth, Plymouth and other ports of the south coast using the PS Pilot. On the arrival of the railway, the PS Eclair was purpose-built for a weekly cross-channel service, departing from Dartmouth each Monday night, and calling at Guernsey and Jersey en route to St Malo, arriving on Tuesday. The following day she would return, again via Jersey and Guernsey, arriving at Dartmouth on Saturday. These sailings were unsuccessful and ended with the sale of the Eclair in 1868.

== History ==
=== Dartmouth Steam Packet Co Ltd ===
In 1856 John Moody and Charles Seale Hayne established a Dartmouth–Totnes steamboat service. The first vessel in the fleet was the purpose-built PS Louisa, a 90-foot paddle steamer built at Deptford on the River Thames in 1856. Two years later, two additional paddle steamers were acquired second hand – the PS Mary for the Totnes run, and PS Pilot for towage work in Dartmouth harbour. In 1859 the company was incorporated under the name the Dartmouth Steam Packet Company. The new company bought all of the shares of the Louisa and a majority of the shares in the Pilot in 1859; with the Mary returning to South Shields. For the next few years, the Pilot, having been refitted as a full-time passenger boat, ran coastal and cross-channel trips, in addition to the normal services.

Seale Hayne's primary commercial interest was the establishment of the Dartmouth and Torbay railway, so when this railway reached Brixham Road, the company operated the connecting ferry service to Greenway. This service was changed to run to Kingswear in 1864, when the railway reached its terminus, and a new steamer was built for the route: the PS Newcomin. In 1865 the company took delivery of the largest ever Dartmouth-based passenger steamer – the 180-foot-long PS Eclair, This steamer was purpose-built for cross-channel services to the channel islands, which were operated in connection with the railway, but the service was unsuccessful, and the Eclair was sold in 1868.

The Louisa was broken up in 1868, when only 12 years old. Her replacement in 1869 was the double ended paddle steamer Dolphin, designed for the short Kingswear route, with the Newcomin now being used on the Totnes route. Also built in the same year was PS Guide, a wooden-hulled tug. In 1871 the formerly competing steamer PS Dartmouth was acquired, giving the Dartmouth Steam Packet Company a monopoly of all of the river's passenger services. From 1872, therefore, the Dartmouth-Totnes service was run by the Newcomin, Dartmouth and Pilot, with the Dolphin on the Kingswear ferry and the Guide chartered out to the West Cornwall Steam Ship Company, as a replacement for their wrecked SS Little Western. She returned to the Dart in 1876.

=== Dartmouth and Torbay Steam Packet Company ===
In 1877 a new syndicate, the Dartmouth and Torbay Steam Packet Company, took over the fleet from Seale Hayne's company. The Guide was immediately sold, followed by the Pilot two years later. In their place came two small screw steamers – the SS Hauley and SS Nimble. In 1879 the Dartmouth was replaced by the trend-setting paddle steamer Berry Castle whose basic design was followed for the next 44 years. In 1883 a further screw-steamer, the SS Dart, was purchased, and in the following year the Newcomin was replaced by the first PS Dartmouth Castle.

Following this period of fleet modernisation were ten years of stability, with the two 'castles' on the Dartmouth–Totnes run, the Dolphin on the Kingswear ferry, and the three screw steamers assisting. At this time the single fare to Totnes was one shilling in the saloon, or ninepence in the forecabin. In 1893 the Dart was sold, and a new paddle steamer: the first PS Totnes Castle entered service. Designed for the winter run, this vessel was smaller than the other paddle steamers, and was flush-decked. The Hauley was sold in 1898.

=== The Edwardian years ===
In 1901 the Kingswear ferry lease was due for renewal, and the Great Western Railway decided to operate the service themselves, purchasing the Dolphin for the purpose. The 'Torbay' element in the company's name was therefore no longer relevant, and in 1904, the company was renamed the River Dart Steamboat Company. At the same time another paddle steamer was added to the fleet: the first Kingswear Castle. In 1906 the company was incorporated. It appears that the Nimble was not transferred to the incorporated company, so its fleet consisted of the four 'castle' class paddle steamers.

In 1907 the first PS Dartmouth Castle was replaced by a similar vessel of the same name. In 1912 the Totnes Castle was sold, two years later her replacement the PS Compton Castle entered service. This steamer was the first to have her deck extended out over her paddle sponsons, in the style which would become typical of the Dart paddlers.

=== World War One ===
Initially there was little effect on the company services following the declaration of war, though later the service was reduced and the company's oldest steamer, PS Berry Castle, was laid up, and broken up in 1917. It is worth noting that the Dartmouth–Totnes service was still a ferry route, and a Royal Mail service at this stage.

=== Between the wars ===
In 1922, the company introduced their first motor vessel, the first MV Berry Castle, a 60-foot-long, twin paraffin engined vessel. The small MV Dittisham Castle was introduced in the same year, to operate a shuttle service from Dartmouth to her namesake village. The following year, two new paddle steamers: the second Totnes Castle and second PS Kingswear Castle were ordered to the same design as the Compton Castle. The second Kingswear Castle inherited the engines from the first, which became an isolation hospital ship at Dartmouth, before being burnt at Fleet Mill Quay to avoid contamination. In 1926, a third motor vessel entered service – the MV Clifton Castle.

There then followed a long period of stability, with the PS Dartmouth Castle, PS Compton Castle, PS Totnes Castle and PS Kingswear Castle running the main Totnes service, MV Dittisham Castle on the Dittisham shuttle. The MV Berry Castle and MV Clifton Castle operated the winter services, and additional services in the summer.

In 1938 a new vessel, the MV Greenway Castle, was built, but went to the Thames shortly afterwards. A further new vessel, MV Seymour Castle, entered service in the following year.

=== World War Two ===
Unlike the First World War, all excursion traffic stopped immediately following the declaration of war. The Totnes Castle was used briefly as a Liberty boat at Devonport Dockyard, and during 1941 operated a limited summer service to Totnes in full peacetime colouring. She also, along with the Kingswear Castle, occasionally relieved on the Kingswear Ferry. Compton Castle was used by the Admiralty as an ammunition carrier. The Seymour Castle was requisitioned by the Admiralty, and used for marking swept channels at Ramsgate. She also took part in the Operation Dynamo to Dunkirk. The Clifton Castle was also sold to the Crown, whilst the MV Dittisham Castle was sold to the Dartmouth Coaling Company. The Berry Castle and Dartmouth Castle were laid up in Old Mill Creek for the duration of the war, by the end of the War Dartmouth Castle was in such poor condition that she never sailed again, and her remains are still in the creek.

=== The postwar years ===
After the war the company was left with only the three paddle steamers and the MV Seymour Castle. The work of rebuilding the fleet commenced with the construction of the MV Dartmouth Castle in 1948, and the MV Berry Castle the following year.

In 1952, following the death of the managing director: John Tolman two years earlier, the company was taken over by Evans & Reid Investment Co Ltd of Cardiff. The new company valued the three motor vessels at a collective £17,311, whilst the three steamers were valued at a scrap value of just £797. Nevertheless, the service ran unchanged until 1961, when a controlling interest was bought in the Devon Star Shipping Co Ltd, operators of the MV Torbay Prince from Torquay. This interest was sold three years later.

After the 1962 season the PS Compton Castle was refused a passenger certificate, and was replaced with a new motor vessel: the MV Conway Castle. The following year the PS Totnes Castle also required major work, and was replaced with a sister to the Conway Castle, the MV Cardiff Castle. The final steamer PS Kingswear Castle remained in service until the end of the 1965 season, when she was sold to the Paddle Steamer Preservation Society.

=== Decline ===
Despite having a modern fleet of five motor vessels, the company continued to decline in the late 1960s, with various factors including the sinking of the Torrey Canyon, poor weather and unemployment contributing to poor seasons. In a diversification, two pilot boats were bought for chartering. MV Berry Castle and MV Seymour Castle were sold after the 1972 season, and the 1974 season was to be the company's last as an operator of pleasure boats. The following year saw the introduction of a new operator on the river: Dart Pleasure Craft, who introduced three motor vessels from the River Thames. The MV Dartmouth Castle was sold in 1975 to Millbrook Steamboat & Trading Co Ltd of Plymouth, who also bought the last RDSC vessel, MV Cardiff Castle in 1977, the MV Conway Castle having been sold earlier in the year.

After the closure of passenger services the company was renamed River Dart Boat and Leisure Co Ltd. It still survives today as part of Evans & Reid Investment Co Ltd, with its activities listed as development and sale of real estate. The diagram below illustrates the transfer of vessels between the various ferry companies of South Devon during the following years.

South Devon Ferries 1972–1987
This table shows the transfer of passenger vessels between various operators in South Devon, caused by the demise of the River Dart Steamboat Company (RDSC) and Millbrook Steamboat and Trading Company (MSTC), and the formation of Dart Pleasure Craft (DPC), Plymouth Boat Cruises (PBC) and Tamar Cruising (TC).
Vessel	1972	73	74	75	76	77	78	79	80	81	82	83	84	85	86	87
Conway Castle	River Dart Steamboat Co						River Severn									
Seymour Castle	RDSC		Various								Riddalls					
Berry Castle	RDSC	Various				Dart Pleasure Craft								PBC		
Dartmouth Castle	RDSC				MSTC		Dart Pleasure Craft									
Cardiff Castle	River Dart Steamboat Co						MSTC							Dart Pleasure Craft		
Humphrey Gilbert	Dartmouth Council				Various			MSTC						Dart Pleasure Craft		
Adrian Gilbert	Dartmouth Council				Var	Dart Pleasure Craft										
My Queen	River Thames				Dart Pleasure Craft									PBC	Riddalls	
Queen Boadiciea	River Thames				Dart Pleasure Craft						MSTC		Scrapped			
Queen Boadiciea II	River Thames				Dart Pleasure Craft									Tamar Cruising		
Plymouth Sound	Newbuilding															TC
Northern Belle	Millbrook Steamboat & Trading Co													Tamar Cruising		
Western Belle	Millbrook Steamboat & Trading Co												Dart Pleasure Craft			
Plymouth Belle	Millbrook Steamboat & Trading Co													Dart Pleasure Craft		
Eastern Belle	Millbrook Steamboat & Trading Co												DPC	PBC		Riddalls
Southern Belle	Millbrook Steamboat & Trading Co													PBC		
Devon Belle	Millbrook Steamboat & Trading Co							River Fal								
Lady Elizabeth	Millbrook Steamboat & Trading Co							Kingsbridge Estuary								
Plymouth Princess	River Thames									Plymouth Boat Cruises						
Plymouth Venturer	Newbuilding										Plymouth Boat Cruises					
Queen of Helford	River Fal			Riddalls												
Vessel	1972	73	74	75	76	77	78	79	80	81	82	83	84	85	86	87

== The River Dart paddle steamer ==
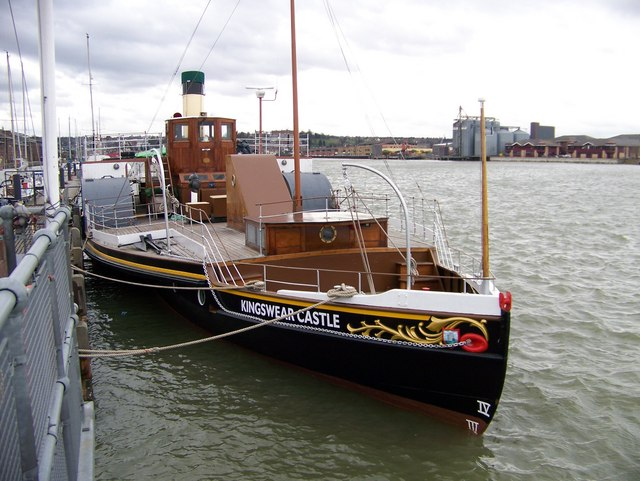
PS Kingswear Castle, showing the classic lines of a River Dart paddle steamer

PS Berry Castle was the first of a series of paddle steamers specifically designed for River Dart service. They were a maximum length of 108 feet, in order to allow them to swing in the river at Totnes. Each was fitted with a two-cylinder compound engine (PS Bery Castle and the first PS Dartmouth Castle had two-cylinder oscillating engines), located forward of the boiler.

Passenger accommodation was located in saloons both forward and aft of the engine room. Open passenger decks were situated above the saloons, with small cockpits at the bow and stern. On the PS Compton Castle and later vessels the deck was widened over long sponsons to the edge of the paddle boxes, and a flying after deck was provided above the aft cockpit. The second PS Dartmouth Castle was later refitted with these features.

The one paddle steamer built to a differing design was the first PS Totnes Castle, which was smaller, and flush-decked, as she was designed mainly for the winter service.

== Fleet list ==
Name	Built	Company service	Notes
PS Louisa	1856	1856–1868	
PS Mary	1852	1858–1859	
PS Pilot	1852	1877–1879	Long distance excursions including Channel Islands
PS Newcomin	1864	1877–1884	
PS Eclair	1865	1865–1868	Long distance excursions including Channel Islands
PS Guide	1869	1869–1877	
PS Dolphin	1869	1877–1901	Double ended Paddle Steamer built for Kingswear Ferry. Sold to GWR in 1901.
PS Dartmouth	1856	1877–1881	
SS Hauley	1877	1877–1898	
SS Nimble	1878	1879–1910	
PS Berry Castle (I)	1880	1880–1917	
SS Dart	1883	1883–1893	
PS Dartmouth Castle (I)	1885	1885–1907	
PS Totnes Castle (I)	1894	1894–1912	Winter Boat for Totnes Service
PS Kingswear Castle (I)	1904	1904–1924	Engines and some other components re-used in construction of PS Kingswear Castle II
PS Dartmouth Castle (II)	1907	1907–1947	
PS Compton Castle	1914	1914–1964	Moored in Truro since 1982, after 14 years in Kingsbridge and 4 years in Looe; sank in May 2023 and to be demolished.
MV Berry Castle (II)	1921	1922–1947	
MV Dittisham Castle	1922	1922–1947	Dartmouth–Dittisham Ferry
PS Totnes Castle (II)	1923	1923–1964	
PS Kingswear Castle (II)	1924	1924–1967	Now owned by the Paddle Steamer Preservation Society and operated under charter by the Dartmouth Steam Railway and Riverboat Company on the River Dart
MV ''Clifton Castle''	1926	1926–1942	
MV Greenway Castle	1937	1937–1938?	
MV Seymour Castle	1938	1938–1973	
MV Dartmouth Castle (III)	1948	1948–1975	Sold to Millbrook Steamboat & Trading Co Ltd but now owned by Dartmouth Steam Railway and Riverboat Company and operating on the River Dart
MV Berry Castle	1948	1948–1975	
MV Conway Castle	1963	1963–1977	Now operating on the River Severn, based at Upton-on-Severn
MV Cardiff Castle	1964	1964–1977	Sold to Millbrook Steamboat & Trading Co Ltd but now owned by Dartmouth Steam Railway and Riverboat Company and operating on the River Dart

== RDSC vessels today ==
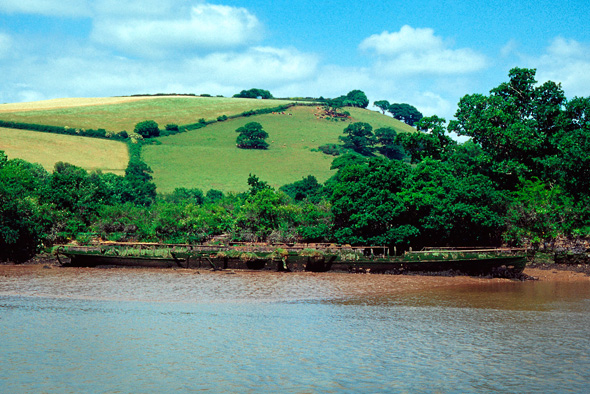
The remains of the first PS Kingswear Castle

The remains of two RSBC paddle steamers can still be seen on the Dart. the first PS Kingswear Castle was burnt in 1924 after being used as a fever hulk, and beached on the bank of the Dart south of Totnes at Fleet Mill Quay. Her remains (pictured) can still be seen today, from a boat on the river. The second PS Dartmouth Castle was laid up in Old Mill Creek, near Dartmouth for the Second World War, and never returned to service. Her remains now form a retaining wall in the creek.

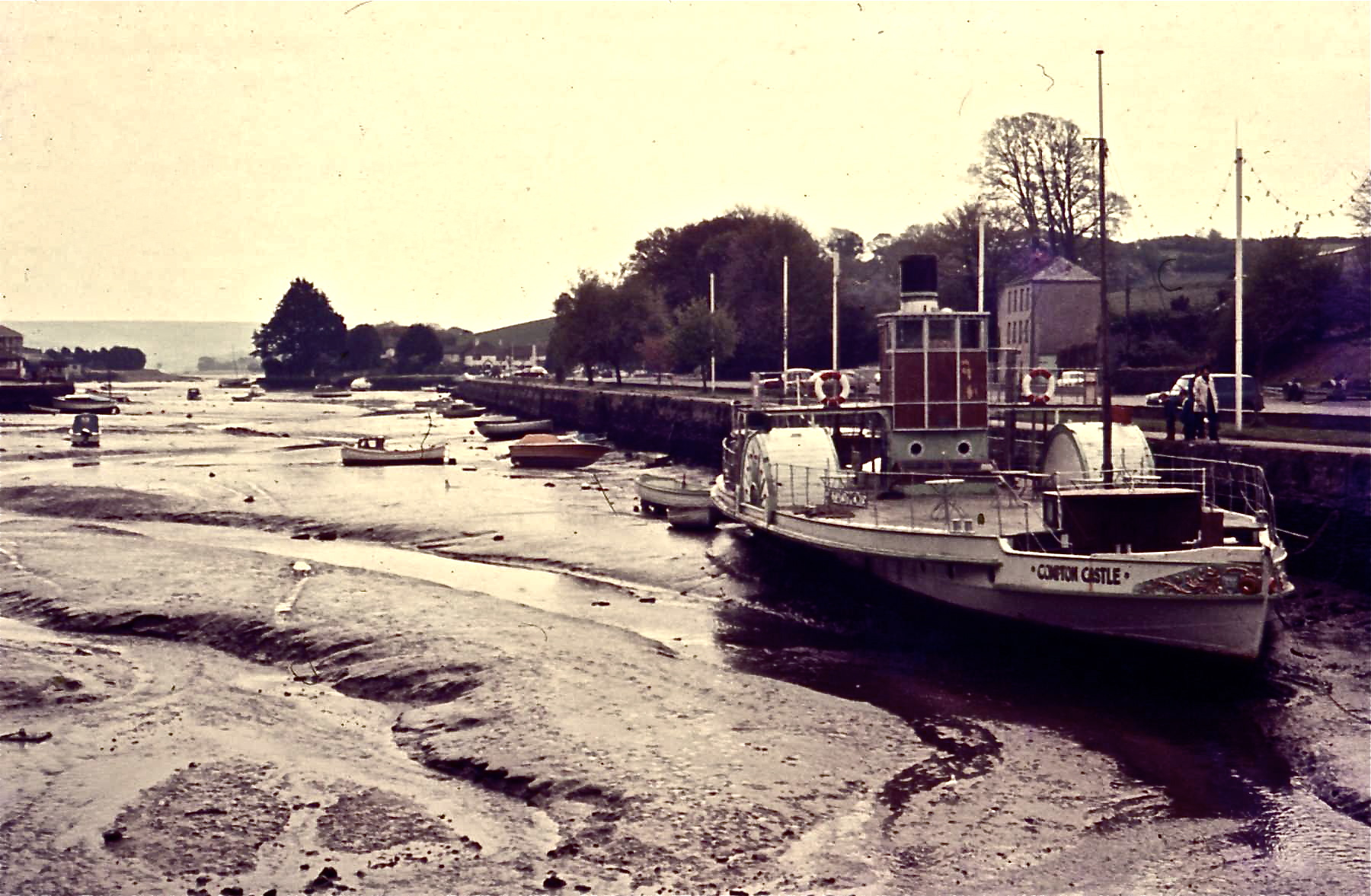
PS Compton Castle in 1974, then a cafe at Kingsbridge

The PS Compton Castle was used for a succession of ventures after being sold by the RDSC, including periods as cafes in Kingsbridge and Truro. She has also been a floating flower shop at Truro, but bears little resemblance to her original condition. Her engines have fared rather better, having survived in museum condition on the Isle of Wight, at Blackgang Chine . In 2015 the engines were acquired by the Paddle Steamer Preservation Society and are currently in store.

The second PS Kingswear Castle is the best preserved of all of the company's vessels, being owned by the Paddle Steamer Preservation Society. The society operated her out of Chatham Dockyard on the River Medway in full passenger service from 1985 until 2012. Since 2013 the society has chartered her to the Dartmouth Steam Railway and Riverboat Company who operate her back on her home waters of the River Dart.

With the exception of the first MV Berry Castle, all of the larger RDSC motor vessels are still in service. All have had major alterations, with the addition of a deck house saloon of various designs, with the exception of the MV Seymour Castle, which remains in original condition. The MV Cardiff Castle is in service on the River Dart for Dart Pleasure Craft, whilst The MV Dartmouth Castle is laid up at Torquay. The MV Conway Castle is operating on the River Severn for Severn Leisure Cruises. The MV Seymour Castle (now named Devon Belle) and the MV Clifton Castle are operating on the Thames, for Thames Rivercruise of Reading and Colliers Launches of Richmond respectively. Finally, the MV Berry Castle, renamed MV Lady Wakefield, is operating on Ullswater in the Lake District for Ullswater Steamers.

== Livery ==
The early steamers had a black hull and cabin sides and a black funnel. On the incorporation of the company in 1906, the funnel colour was changed to yellow, with a black top. Wheelhouses and companionways, where fitted were of varnished wood. Early motor vessels also followed this livery, though none were fitted with funnels. By the time of the introduction of the MV Dartmouth Castle of 1948, the motor vessels had their hulls and cabin sides painted white.

== Nomenclature ==
Early steamers had a variety of names, two interesting ones being PS Newcomin, named after Thomas Newcomen, an early steam engine pioneer, and SS Hauley, named after John Hawley, a fourteenth-century privateer.

Most of the vessels built for the company had names ending with 'Castle'. Of these, Dartmouth and Kingswear Castles are the pair of small fortifications which protect the mouth of the River Dart from attack by sea. Totnes Castle is a Norman motte and bailey castle, high above the town of Totnes, whilst Compton Castle is a fortified manor house some 6 kilometres (3.7 mi) to the northeast of the river. Berry Castle refers to Berry Pomeroy Castle, a ruin some 3.5 kilometres (2.2 mi) to the northeast of the Dart, whilst Greenway Castle is a house at Greenway, home to the Gilbert family, and later to Agatha Christie.

The other castles are somewhat more esoteric. There is no such place as Seymour Castle, but the Seymour family owned both Totnes and Berry Pomeroy castles. Clifton is an ancient part of the town of Dartmouth, so Clifton Castle may refer to Dartmouth Castle, or to Bayard's Cove Fort, a small fortification nearer the town centre, designed to be a second line of defence for the town. There is no Dittisham Castle; this name simply indicated the vessel's normal destination.

The final two vessels of the company broke with tradition, and were named after Cardiff Castle and Conway Castle, both large castles in Wales, reflecting the company's Welsh ownership.
