= British Firework Championships =

Annual fireworks competition held in Plymouth, England

Coordinates: 50°21′34″N 4°08′07″W

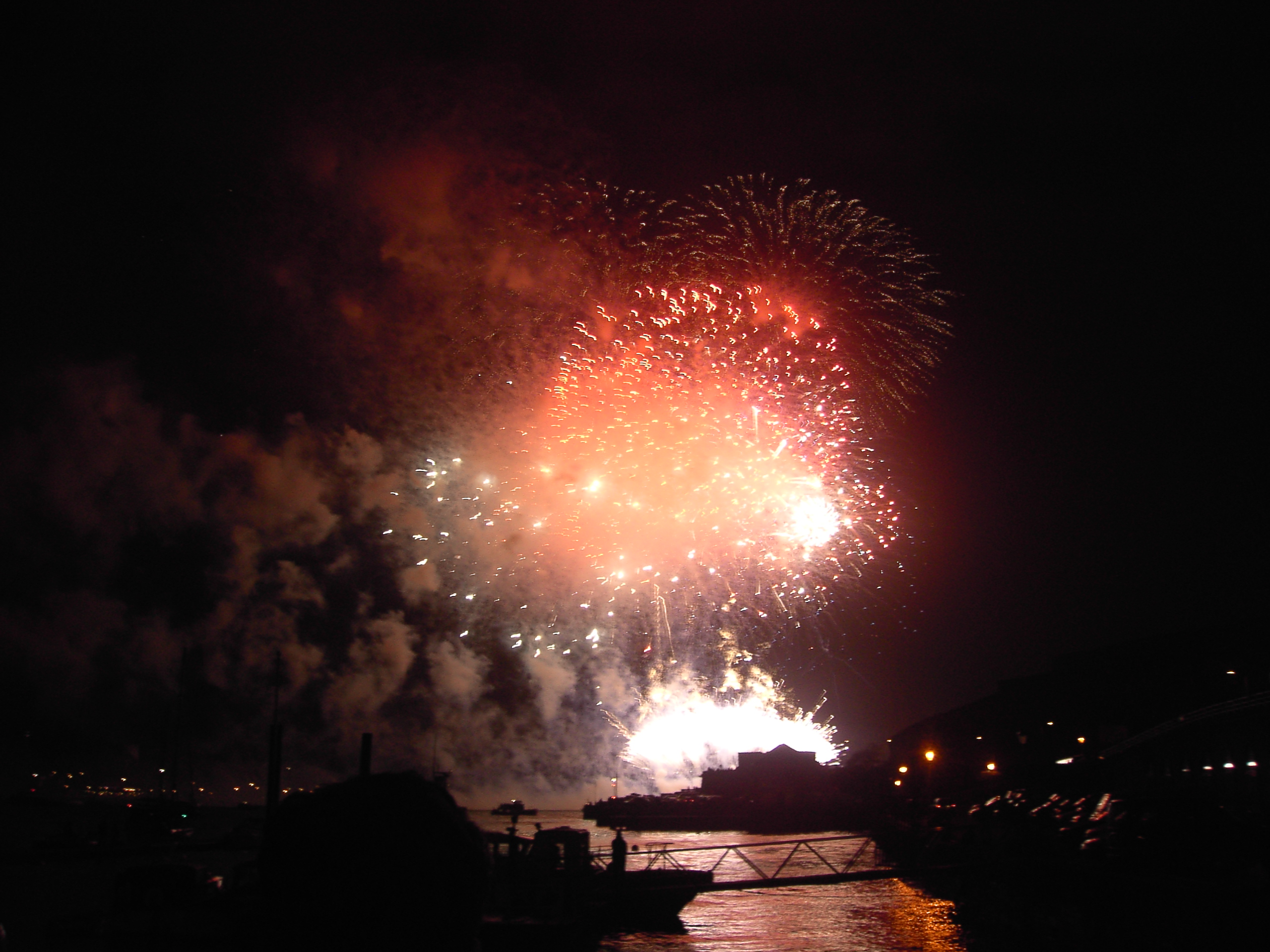
- British Firework Championships in Plymouth
- Begins: 9.30pm
- Ends: 10.15pm
- Frequency: Annually
- Locations: Mount Batten Breakwater, Plymouth, United Kingdom
- Inaugurated: 1997
- Attendance: 200,000+
- Website: http://www.britishfireworks.co.uk/

The British Firework Championships or National Firework Championships is an annual competition held in Plymouth, Devon, England, every August where judges review fireworks displays from professional fireworks companies and select the best examples.

It is watched by more than 200,000 people annually and is one of the largest non-ticketed events held in the South–West of the UK.

== History ==
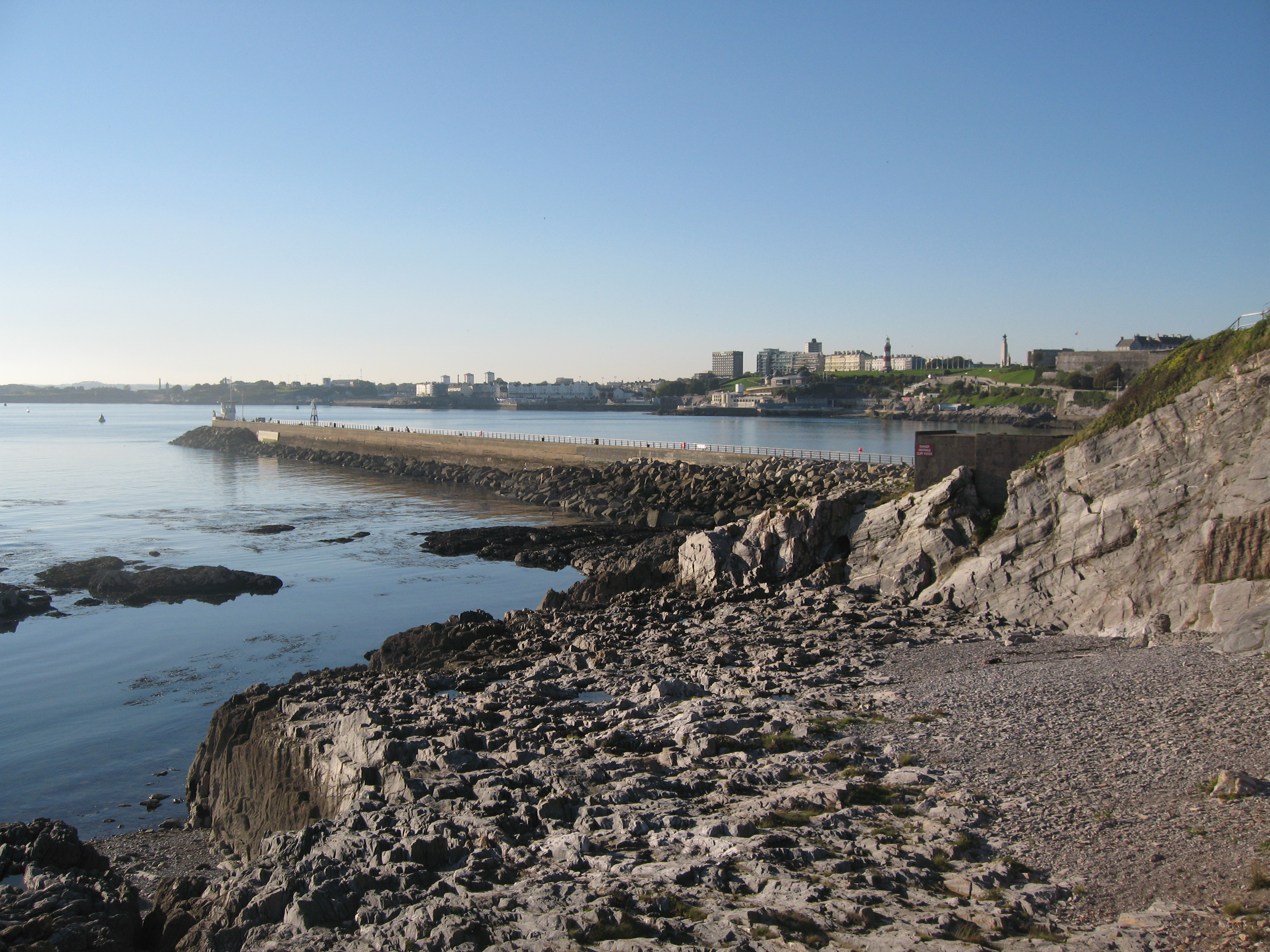
The event takes place on the Mount Batten breakwater each year

The competition was first held in 1997. Competitors set up their displays on the Mount Batten Breakwater which is closed to the public for the duration of the competition. The competition rules place restrictions on budget, duration and amount of ordinance that can be used for each display.

As part of the event's tenth anniversary in 2006, eight prior winners were invited to take part in a Champion of Champions competition. A lecturer from the University of Plymouth, Roy Lowry, attempted to break the world record of the highest number of rockets fired simultaneously with 55,000.

In 2012, no winner was declared due to bad weather in Plymouth. The 2013 event was a 'Champion of Champions' with the six previous winners being invited. This was postponed from 2012. Star Fireworks being crowned Champion of Champions.

2019 was expected to be a 'Champion of Champions' event, but only two of the winning companies from the 2013 - 2018 competitions accepted to take part.

Due to concerns about managing social distancing during the COVID-19 pandemic, the event was cancelled in 2020.

== Winners ==
- 1997: Fantastic Fireworks
- 1998: Northern Lights Fireworks
- 1999: Happy Dragon Fireworks
- 2000: Pyro 1
- 2001: Shellscape Pyrotechnics
- 2002: Shellscape Pyrotechnics (second win)
- 2003: Jubilee Fireworks
- 2004: Alan Hillary Pyrotechnics now Reaction Fireworks
- 2005: MLE Pyrotechnics
- 2006, Champion of Champions winner: Jubilee Fireworks (second win)
- 2007: Selstar Fireworks
- 2008: Pendragon Fireworks
- 2009: Phoenix Fireworks
- 2010: Star Fireworks
- 2011: MLE Pyrotechnics (second win)
- 2012: No winner declared due to bad weather.
- 2013, Champion of Champions winner: Star Fireworks (second win)
- 2014: Blitz Fireworks
- 2015: Fantastic Fireworks (second win)
- 2016: Gala Fireworks
- 2017: Selstar Fireworks (second win)
- 2018: Illusion Fireworks
- 2019: 1st Galaxy Fireworks were named as the 2019 winners and Selstar were named as The Champion of Champions.
- 2020: Cancelled due to COVID-19 pandemic
- 2021: Aurora Fireworks Ltd
- 2022: sonic fireworks
- 2023: Skyburst the Firework Co.
- 2024: BBB Fireworks
- 2025: Selstar Fireworks (third win).
- 2026: AJ Pyrotechnics
