= Busan Port Authority =

Government agency of South Korea

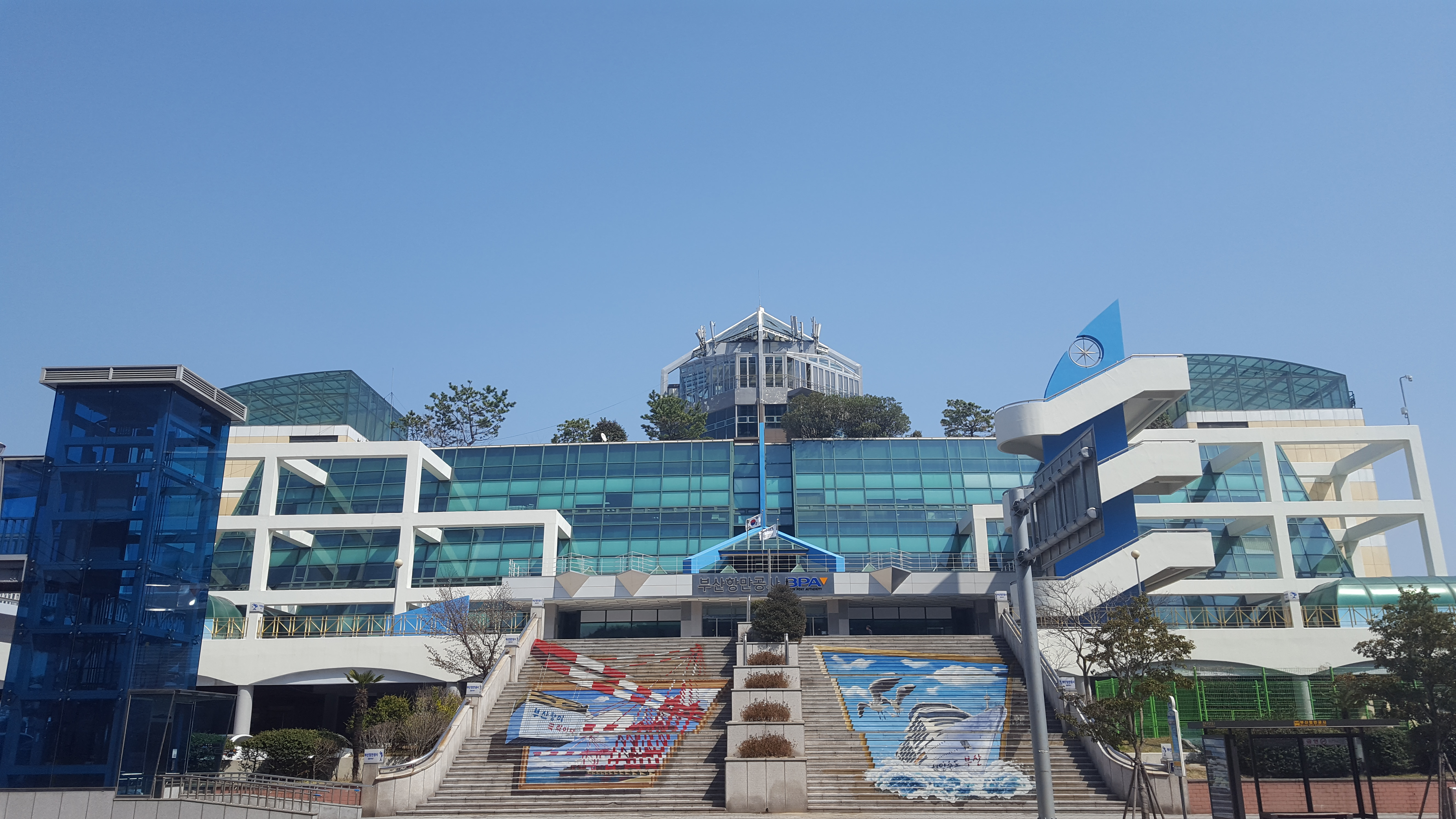
Busan Port Authority in 2018.

The Busan Port Authority is the governing body of the South Korean port of Busan. They are responsible for the maritime and seaport trade and is the leading seaport in the country.

== See also ==
- Pusan Newport International Terminal
