= British Pyrotechnists Association =

The British Pyrotechnists Association (BPA) is the trade body that represents the majority of professional firework display companies in the United Kingdom. The Association is committed to maintaining high standards amongst its members, whose activities include the manufacture, importation, sale, transportation, training and use of display fireworks both by members of the public and professionals.

As a central representative body the British Pyrotechnists Association encourages the highest standards with respect to safety, on-site practice and performance of fireworks displays by its members and members of the general public. The Association is a central source of information on all questions relating to the display industry and is responsible for maintaining close liaison with the appropriate authorities on all matters concerning the manufacture, storage, transportation and exhibition of display fireworks. It also considers, makes recommendations, or takes other necessary action on all related aspects of UK and European legislation governing professional fireworks and related products.

Members of the Association sit on a number of Health and Safety Executive and Local Government enforcement committees, along with European committees concerned with the harmonisation of fireworks related legislation throughout the European Community.

== Firer's examination scheme ==
In 2003 the British Pyrotechnists Association introduced a Firer’s training scheme for its members, to help set a common standard of safety and knowledge throughout the professional display industry. The scheme requires candidates to undertake a course of training in accordance with a detailed syllabus, after which they sit an exam. Successful candidates are then issued with a BPA Firer’s identification card to show that they have undertaken the training course and passed the exam. The Association maintains a register of firers on its website that can be checked by anyone wanting to verify the authenticity of BPA Firer’s identification.

Although there is no statutory requirement in the United Kingdom for professional display operators to be licensed or to have received any training, many local authorities and organisations will only allow companies and individuals to work for them who have achieved the BPA qualification.

There are two levels of achievement in the scheme. Level 1 is for all personnel involved in setting up and firing professional firework displays, and the higher Level 2 is for professional firework displays managers and supervisors. The scheme is based on a sound knowledge of the hazards associated with:

- Firework types
- Firework effects
- Fireworks in transport
- Rigging techniques
- Site design
- Firing methods
- Fallout considerations
- Disposal

In addition to the training and examination, each candidate is required to maintain a log book of their firework display experience. The log book can be used to verify that display personnel have the necessary practical experience, in a variety of display environments, to complement their formal training.
