= G.H. Riddalls and Sons =

G.H. Riddalls and Sons was a passenger boat operator on the River Dart, in South Devon, England. It operated on the route from Dartmouth to Totnes, on circular cruises from Dartmouth and also ran the ferry service from Dartmouth to Dittisham. The boats were painted with red hulls and white superstructures, and were marketed as the "Red Cruisers".

In 2000 the company was acquired by Dart Valley Railway plc, operators of the Dartmouth Steam Railway, who already owned Riddalls main competitor, Dart Pleasure Craft. Riddalls newer vessels were merged into the Dart Pleasure Craft fleet, and painted in "River Link" colours, dark blue hulls and white superstructures, whilst the older vessels of both fleets were sold. The Dittisham ferry service was not included in the deal, and was run for several years by David A Riddalls Trading (D.A.R.T), until it too was taken over by Dart Pleasure Craft in 2008.

== Fleet List ==
Name	From	To	Notes
MV Heart's Content			
MV Queen of Helford	197?	1994	
MV Dartmothian	1982	1997	
MV Totnes Princess	1985	2000	Sold by Dart Pleasure Craft to Laxey Towing Company of the Isle of Man
MV My Queen	1987	2000	Sold by Dart Pleasure Craft to operate on the River Exe
MV Dartmouth Princess	1994	2000	Transferred to Dart Pleasure Craft fleet
MV Dittisham Princess	1995	2000	Transferred to Dart Pleasure Craft fleet
