= MV Devon Belle II =

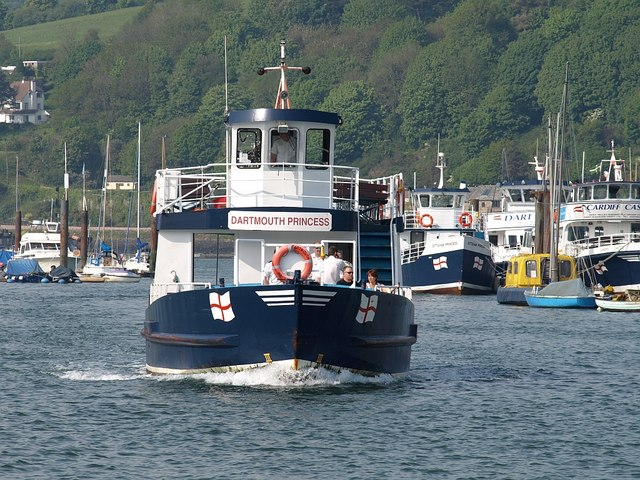
- Dartmouth Princess in River Link colours

History

United Kingdom
- Name: Devon Belle II; Dartmouth Princess
- Namesake: Dartmouth in South Devon, UK
- Owner: K J Bridge (1990); G.H. Riddalls and Sons (1994); Dart Pleasure Craft Ltd(2000)
- Route: Plymouth (1990); River Dart (1994); Dartmouth-Kingswear Ferry (2001)
- Launched: 1990
- Status: In service

General characteristics
- Type: Single-screw motor vessel
- Length: 60 ft (18 m) LOA
- Decks: 2
- Propulsion: Diesel
- Capacity: 156 passengers

MV Dartmouth Princess is a single screw passenger vessel, operating on the River Dart in South Devon, United Kingdom. She is mainly used on the Dartmouth Passenger Ferry service from Dartmouth to Kingswear, where she runs year-round as the main vessel.

== History ==
The ship was built as MV Devon Belle II for K J Bridge of Plymouth, where she operated from West Hoe Steps. In 1994 she was sold to G.H. Riddalls and Sons of Dartmouth. She was used on their cruises from Dartmouth to Totnes, and on circular cruises from Dartmouth. Shortly after being bought by Riddalls, her superstructure was extended to the stern. In 2000 the Riddalls fleet was bought by Dart Pleasure Craft Ltd and she was transferred to their fleet, with her former red hull painted blue. She was placed on the Dartmouth-Kingswear ferry, which operates in conjunction with the steam trains of the Paignton and Dartmouth Steam Railway which is owned by the same company.

== Design ==
MV Dartmouth Princess is a steel twin-deck passenger vessel. The main deck is slightly lower than the gunwale, so she has a forward well deck, with a partially enclosed saloon aft with bar and toilets on the main deck. The aft part of the saloon has a removable fabric roof, and is open to the stern. There is a large open deck on the upper deck along with the wheelhouse, accessed by an external stairway forward.
