= Project bank account =

A project bank account is a means of paying sub-contractors in a construction project directly from the funds made available by the construction client instead of from the earnings or funds of the prime contractor. The UK Government promotes the use of project bank accounts (PBAs) in major construction projects.

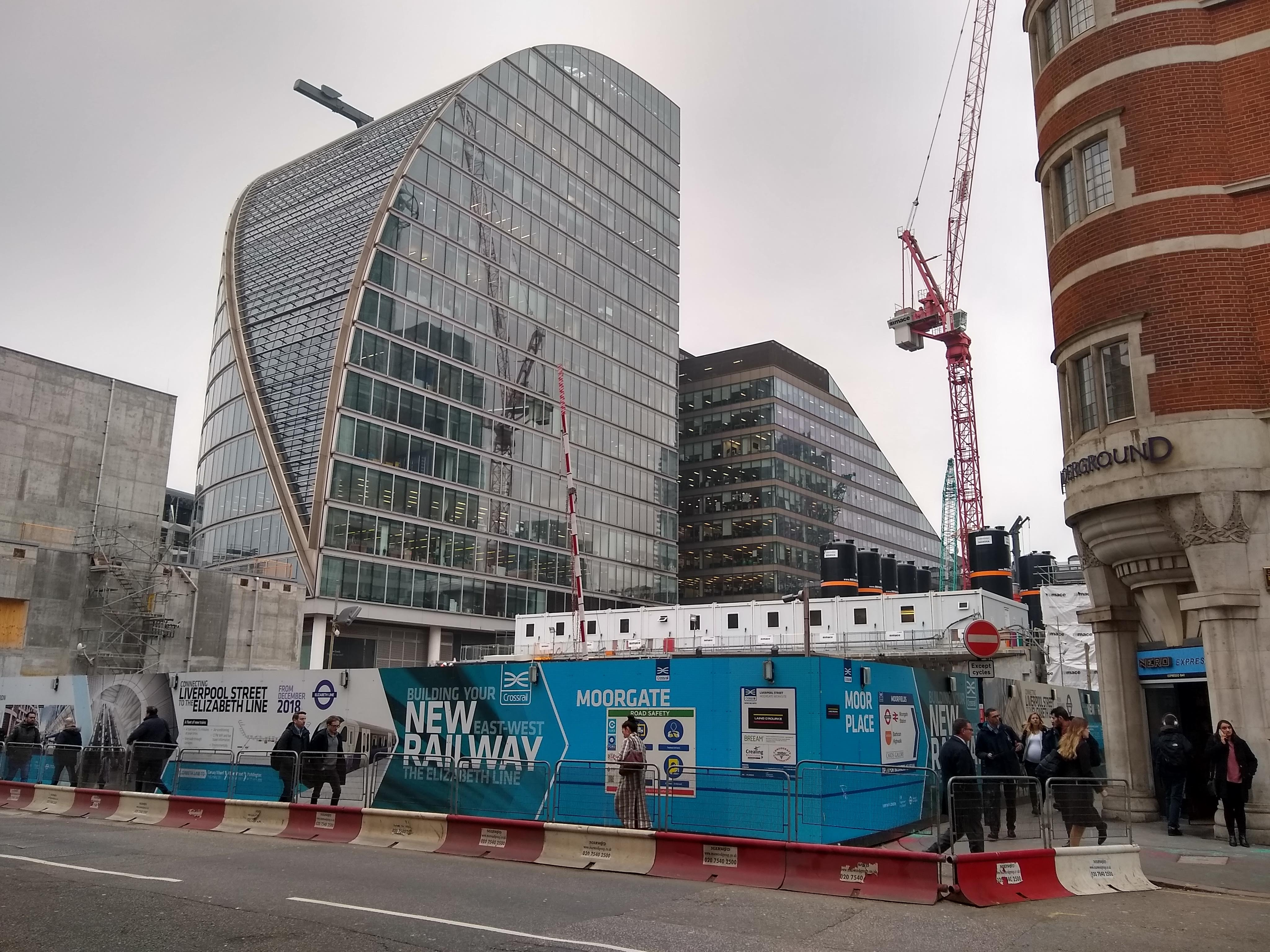
Construction of the Crossrail link with Liverpool Street station at Moorgate, November 2018

UK Government guidance describes a PBA as "a ring-fenced bank account from which payments are made directly and simultaneously to a lead contractor and members of the supply chain. Through faster payments, those lower down the supply chain benefit from that cash-flow".

John M. Stevens, Director of Dodd Group, an electrical and mechanical services sub-contractor, reflects that "without doubt this has to be the way forward for our industry if the current payment culture is to be eradicated". PBAs help eliminate the excuses for late or reduced payment, the burdens on overhead costs and the programme delays as a result of disputes and resultant insolvencies, which often result in small and medium sized enterprises being hardest hit.

A UK Government briefing document published in 2012 identified the Crossrail project, the Highways Agency and the Ministry of Defence as users of the PBA approach to payments. Barclays Bank and the Bank of Scotland were identified as financial institutions supporting use of PBAs. The Joint Contracts Tribunal (JCT) provides documentation to support the use of a PBA involving the client, prime contractor and sub-contractors. Crossrail refers to its use of PBAs as a feature of its "legacy learning" for future projects whose partners want to implement the process.
