= Windswept =

Windswept may refer to:

- Windswept (song), a song performed by Bryan Ferry
- Windswept (Steuben, Maine), the summer house of writer Mary Ellen Chase
- Windswept (novel), a book by Mary Ellen Chase
- Windswept Acres-Powers House
- Windswept Farm
- Windswept House: A Vatican Novel
- Nematoceras dienemum, also known as the "windswept helmet orchid"
