= PS Scotia (1847) =

Steam paddle passenger vessel

History
- Name: 1847–1863: Scotia; 1863: General Banks; 1863–1864: Fanny and Jenny
- Owner: 1847–1859: Chester and Holyhead Railway; 1859–1861: London and North Western Railway; 1861–1864: Unknown
- Operator: 1847–1858: Chester and Holyhead Railway; 1858–1859: Scilly Isles Steam Navigation Company; 1859–1861: London and North Western Railway; 1861–1864: Unknown
- Port of registry: (United Kingdom)
- Route: Holyhead-Kingstown
- Ordered: January 1847
- Builder: Money Wigram, Blackwall Yard
- Launched: 14 September 1847
- Out of service: 1864

PS Scotia was a steam paddle passenger vessel that ran between Wales and Ireland from 1847 to 1861, and then became an American Civil War blockade runner. Renamed General Banks, then Fanny and Jenny, she ran aground in February 1864 attempting to reach Wilmington, North Carolina.

== History ==
In January 1847, the Chester & Holyhead Railway Company ordered four steamers, from four different shipbuilders, to commence an Irish Sea service between Holyhead, Anglesey and Kingstown, near Dublin. Scotia was launched by Money Wigram & Sons at their Blackwall Yard, London on 14 September 1847, and engined by Maudslay, Sons and Field of Lambeth.

From 1858 to 1859 she was loaned to the Scilly Isles Steam Navigation Company until their new ship the Little Western was ready.

She was transferred in 1859 to the London & North Western Railway Company.

== American Civil War ==
At Liverpool in December 1861, she was sold as a blockade runner and she made four runs and on the fifth attempting to reach Charleston she was captured by the Federals on 24 October 1862 at Bull's Bay, South Carolina.

By 23 January 1863, she had been sold and was registered at New York as General Banks. By then end of 1863 she had again been sold a number of times and ended up registered at Nassau as Fanny and Jenny.

She made two more runs against the Blockade but was driven ashore by the USS Florida on Wrightsville Beach, Masonboro Inlet, North Carolina on 10 February 1864.
