= List of shipwrecks in October 1874 =

The list of shipwrecks in October 1874 includes ships sunk, foundered, grounded, or otherwise lost during October 1874.

== 1 October ==
List of shipwrecks: 1 October 1874
Ship	State	Description
Argonaut	United Kingdom	The barque foundered in a typhoon 50 nautical miles (93 km) east of Formosa. All nineteen people on board were rescued by a French barque. She was on a voyage from Swansea, Glamorgan to Yokohama, Japan.
Bertha	France	The barque ran aground at Cap-Haïtien, Haiti and was severely damaged.
Charles	Sweden	The ship was driven ashore near "Oestley" She was on a voyage from Helsinki, Grand Duchy of Finland to Kalmar. She was refloated and resumed her voyage.
Saba	Italy	The brig foundered in the Atlantic Ocean. Her crew were rescued by Belle of Lagos (United Kingdom). Saba was on a voyage from New York, United States to Limerick, United Kingdom.
Surprise	United Kingdom	The schooner was driven ashore and wrecked at Kessingland, Suffolk.
Wallachia	United Kingdom	The schooner ran aground on the Schwartzonen Sand, in the North Sea. She was on a voyage from Lybster, Caithness to Altona, Germany.

== 2 October ==
List of shipwrecks: 2 October 1874
Ship	State	Description
Cavalier	United Kingdom	The ship ran aground at Liverpool, Lancashire. She was on a voyage from Quebec City, Canada to Liverpool. She was refloated and taken in to the River Mersey.
Crighton	United Kingdom	The steamship ran aground at "Ottchakoff", Russia. She was on a voyage from Odesa to Nicolaieff. She was refloated the next day with the assistance of a tug and taken in to Nicolaieff.
Dee, Hawkesbury, Jane, Limehouse, Ready and Tilbury	United Kingdom	The tug Ready was towing the barges Dee, Hawkesbury, Jane, Limehouse and Tilbury in the Regent's Canal through Regent's Park when Tilbury exploded and was obliterated with the loss of her three crew, also destroying the Macclesfield Bridge. Limehouse sank; her crew survived. The other barges were damaged. The keel of Ready ended up embedded in a house 300 yards (270 m) from the site of the explosion. At least two buildings were destroyed and many others were severely damaged. London Zoo sustained damage. A number of animals were killed and several birds escaped due to broken glass.
Ebenezer	United Kingdom	The ship sank at South Shields, County Durham.
Invincible	United Kingdom	The fishing yawl was run down and sunk by a schooner off Scarborough, Yorkshire. Her crews were rescued by the yawls Nonpareil and Thetis (both United Kingdom).
Isabella, and John and Eliza	United Kingdom	The ship Isabella collided with the sloop John and Eliza (United Kingdom off St. Bees Head, Cumberland and was beached. John and Eliza was also beached. She was on a voyage from Barrow-in-Furness, Lancashire to Workington, Cumberland.
Mariner	United Kingdom	The schooner was abandoned in the North Sea (54°24′N 4°16′E). Her crew were rescued by the steamship Commissarat (Russia). Mariner was on a voyage from Harburg, Germany to Arbroath, Forfarshire.
Mary Cole	United Kingdom	The brigantine was driven ashore near Workington.
Richard Brown	United Kingdom	The ship was driven ashore at Portrush, County Antrim. She was refloated the next day.
Salus	United Kingdom	The ship was driven ashore at Whitehaven, Cumberland with the loss of a crew member. Also reported ashore at Workington.
Unnamed	United Kingdom	The ship was wrecked on the Isle of Whithorn, Wigtownshire with the loss of a crew member.

== 3 October ==
List of shipwrecks: 3 October 1874
Ship	State	Description
Alexandra	United Kingdom	The smack departed from West Hartlepool, County Durham for Glückstadt, Germany. No further trace, presumed foundered with the loss of both crew.
Isabella Wilson	United Kingdom	The schooner departed from Leith, Lothian for Harburg, Germany. No further trace, presumed foundered with the loss of all five crew.
Otto	Russia	The ship was driven ashore at "Areby". She was on a voyage from Riga to Grangemouth, Stirlingshire, United Kingdom. She was refloated on 7 October and taken in to Kalmar.
United Brothers	New Zealand	The 50-ton schooner beached at Papakaio Point, 8 kilometres (5.0 miles) north of Oamaru after taking on water during a heavy sea. She became a complete wreck.

== 4 October ==
List of shipwrecks: 4 October 1874
Ship	State	Description
Comet, or Courier	United Kingdom	The steamship struck the Plough Seat Rock. She put in to Berwick upon Tweed, Northumberland in a leaky condition and sank there. She was refloated on 7 October. Subsequently taken in to the River Tyne for repair.
Unnamed	France	The lugger was driven ashore at North Somercotes, Lincolnshire. She was refloated.

== 5 October ==
List of shipwrecks: 5 October 1874
Ship	State	Description
Ermenegilda Danovara	Flag unknown	The ship put in to Pernambuco, Brazil on fire and was scuttled. She was on a voyage from Cardiff, Glamorgan, United Kingdom to Valparaíso, Chile. She was later refloated.

== 6 October ==
List of shipwrecks: 6 October 1874
Ship	State	Description
Annie Barker	United Kingdom	The ship ran aground at Crosby, Lancashire. She was on a voyage from Paraíba, Brazil to Liverpool, Lancashire. She was refloated with assistance from the tug Dandy (United Kingdom) and taken in to Liverpool in a leaky condition.
Annie Frost	United Kingdom	The ship collided with the paddle steamer Tynwald ( (United Kingdom of Great Britain and Ireland) Isle of Man) in the River Mersey and was damaged. Annie Frost was on a voyage from Liverpool to Madras, India.
Isis	United Kingdom	The ship was driven ashore at "Foova". She was on a voyage from Porto, Portugal to London. She was refloated and resumed her voyage.
Maid of Erin	United Kingdom	The schooner was driven ashore and wrecked at Portavogie, County Down. She was on a voyage from Workington, Cumberland to Dublin.
Maypocho	United Kingdom	The ship was sighted in the Pacific Ocean whilst on a voyage from Liverpool to Valparaíso, Chile. No further trace, presumed foundered with the loss of all 21 people on board.
Meteor	Canada	The steamship was lost at the entrance to the Strait of Canso. She was on a voyage from Sydney, Nova Scotia to Summerside, Newfoundland Colony.
Neptune	Norway	The ship was driven ashore on the east coast of Öland, Sweden. She was on a voyage from Kronstadt, Russia to Christiania. She was refloated and taken in to Kalmar, Sweden.
Queen	United Kingdom	The brigantine was abandoned in the North Sea. She was on a voyage from Hamburg, Germany to South Shields, County Durham. She was subsequently towed in to "Lohnestranden".
Sir William Pulteney	(United Kingdom of Great Britain and Ireland) Guernsey	The brig was wrecked on the Newcombe Sand, in the North Sea off the coast of Suffolk. Her fifteen crew were rescued by the Kessingland Lifeboat Bolton ( Royal National Lifeboat Institution) and a yawl. Sir William Pulteney was on a voyage from South Shields to Cherbourg, Manche, France.
Uncle Joe	United Kingdom	The ship was driven ashore at the mouth of the River Avon. She was on a voyage from Bristol, Gloucestershire to Key West, Florida, United States.
Violette	France	The schooner was driven ashore and wrecked in Mount's Bay. Her crew were rescued. She was on a voyage from Nantes, Loire-Inférieure to Newport, Monmouthshire, United Kingdom.
Wave	United Kingdom	The ship was driven ashore on Gullholmen, Norway with the loss of two of her crew. She was on a voyage from Christiania to a British port.

== 7 October ==
List of shipwrecks: 7 October 1874
Ship	State	Description
Capiolani	Flag unknown	The barque was wrecked on a reef off Oeni Island. All nineteen people on board reached the island in boats. They were rescued on 10 October by the full-rigged ship Horsa (United Kingdom). Capiolani was on a voyage from Brisbane, Queensland to San Francisco, California, United States.
Caroline Louise	Norway	The brig was driven ashore at Farsund. She was refloated and found to be leaky.
Dart	United Kingdom	The schooner was driven ashore and wrecked at Southwick, Sussex.
Earl St. Vincent	United Kingdom	The schooner was driven ashore and wrecked in South Ardwell Bay, Wigtownshire. Her crew were rescued. She was on a voyage from Londonderry to Creetown, Wigtownshire.
Janet Jacob	Netherlands	The ship ran aground near Farsund. She was on a voyage from Memel, Germany to "Stornziel".
Lionne	France	The schooner foundered off Cape Finisterre, Spain. Her crew were rescued.
Marathon	United States	The fishing schooner foundered in the Grand Banks of Newfoundland with the loss of all but two of her crew. The survivors were rescued from a boat on 14 October by the steamship Greece (United Kingdom).

== 8 October ==
List of shipwrecks: 8 October 1874
Ship	State	Description
Bloomer	United Kingdom	The schooner was driven ashore at Dromore Point, County Down. She was on a voyage from Whitehaven, Cumberland to Belfast, County Antrim. She was refloated and taken in to Dromore.
Concord	United Kingdom	The ship ran aground at Falsterbo, Sweden. She was on a voyage from West Hartlepool, County Durham to Danzig, Germany. She was refloated and taken in to Copenhagen, Denmark for repairs.
Elizabeth	United Kingdom	The ship was wrecked in the Sound of Islay. Her crew were rescued. She was on a voyage from the Orkney Islands to Campbeltown.
Enterprise	United Kingdom	The ship was driven ashore and wrecked at Rauma, Grand Duchy of Finland. Her crew were rescued. She was on a voyage from West Hartlepool, County Durham to Pori, Grand Duchy of Finland.
Euploea	Germany	The barque ran aground and was wrecked at Farsund, Norway. Her crew were rescued. She was on a voyage from Memel to Newcastle upon Tyne, Northumberland, United Kingdom. She was refloated and towed in to Farsund.
Flying Childers	United Kingdom	The tug sank at Belfast.
Mochrum Lass	United Kingdom	The ship was driven ashore in the Bay of Luce. Her crew were rescued. She was on a voyage from Workington, Cumberland to Portwilliam, Wigtownshire.
Rover	(United Kingdom of Great Britain and Ireland) Isle of Man	The sloop deoarted from Whitehaven, Cumberland for Peel. Subsequently foundered with the loss of all three crew. Wreckage from the ship washed up at Jurby.
Thistle	United Kingdom	The sloop departed from Whitehaven for Ramsey, Isle of Man. No further trace, presumed foundered with the loss of all hands.
Titus	United Kingdom	The Mersey Flat sank at Liverpool, Lancashire. She was on a voyage from Garston to Liverpool.
Tonia	Norway	The brig was driven ashore and wrecked at Farsund. She was on a voyage from Fredrikstad to Antwerp, Belgium.
Vesuvius	Netherlands	The steamship ran aground in the Meuse at Brouwershaven, Zeeland. She was on a voyage from Kronstadt, Russia to Rotterdam, South Holland. She was refloated on 30 October and taken in to Rotterdam for repairs.
Unnamed	United Kingdom	The ship was driven ashore in Luce Bay.

== 9 October ==
List of shipwrecks: 9 October 1874
Ship	State	Description
Constantino Lapante	Russia	The full-rigged ship was run into by the steamship Northfield (United Kingdom) and sank at "Kavak".
Gertrude	United Kingdom	The brig ran aground on the Jordan Flats, in Liverpool Bay. Her crew were rescued by the steamship Prince of Wales and the Liverpool Lifeboat. Gertrude was on a voyage from Runcorn, Cheshire to Marseille, Bouches-du-Rhône, France. She was refloated and towed in to the River Mersey.
Glenroy	United Kingdom	The steamship was driven ashore 30 nautical miles (56 km) south of Suez, Egypt.
Grand Duchess	United Kingdom	The ship was wrecked at Saugor, India. Her crew were reported missing. she was on a voyage from Liverpool, Lancashire to Calcutta, India.
Jessie Ann	United Kingdom	The schooner ran aground and sank at Ayr.
John and Henry	United Kingdom	The schooner was driven ashore at the Point of Ayre, Isle of Man. She was on a voyage from Whitehaven, Cumberland to Swansea, Glamorgan. She was refloated on 14 October and taken in to Ramsey, Isle of Man.
Lavinia	Flag unknown	The schooner was driven ashore on Öland, Sweden. She was on a voyage from Norrköping, Sweden to Antwerp, Belgium. She was refloated and put back to Norrköping in a leaky condition.
Munin	United Kingdom	The steamship sprang a leak and was beached at Rock Ferry, Cheshire. She was on a voyage from Gothenburg, Sweden to Liverpool, Lancashire. She was refloated the next day and taken in to Garston, Lancashire.
Rientse	Germany	The brig ran aground near Tønsberg. She was on a voyage from Middlesbrough, Yorkshire, United Kingdom to Stettin.
Shandon	United Kingdom	The ship was driven ashore and wrecked on Anticosti Island, Nova Scotia, Canada. Her crew were rescued by Abram Young ( Canada). Shandon was on a voyage from Glasgow, Renfrewshire to Quebec City, Canada.

== 10 October ==
List of shipwrecks: 10 October 1874
Ship	State	Description
Christian	United Kingdom	The schooner was driven ashore near Glengad Head, County Mayo.
Duke of Wellington	United Kingdom	The barque put in to Bowmore, Islay in a waterlogged condition. She was on a voyage from Onega, Russia to Liverpool, Lancashire. She was taken in to for Liverpool by the tug Fiery Cross (United Kingdom) on 14 October.
Falcon	United Kingdom	The schooner was abandoned off Inchcape, Fife. Her crew were rescued by the pilot cutter Dee (United Kingdom). Falcon was on a voyage from Sunderland, County Durham to Cullen, Moray.
Haas	Norway	The brig ran aground at Porto, Portugal. She was on a voyage from Quebec City, Canada to Porto.
Joven Thomas	Portugal	The barque ran aground at Porto. She was on a voyage from New York to Porto.
St. Helena	France	The barque was wrecked at "Haelloe". She was on a voyage from Calais to Drøbak, Norway.
Swan	United Kingdom	The Mersey Flat sank off Bromborough, Cheshire.
Wave	United Kingdom	The smack sprang a leak and foundered off Lamlash, Isle of Arran. Her crew were rescued. She was on a voyage from Belfast, County Antrim to Greenock, Renfrewshire.
Whitby	United Kingdom	The brigantine ran aground at Orfordness, Suffolk. She was on a voyage from Goole, Yorkshire to London. She was refloated and found to be leaky.
Unnamed	Flag unknown	The schooner capsized 20 nautical miles (37 km) south east by east of Gorgona Island, Italy.

== 11 October ==
List of shipwrecks: 11 October 1874
Ship	State	Description
Arconera	Germany	The ship ran aground 16 nautical miles (30 km) south of Pillau. She was refloated and taken in to Pillau.
Carmania	United Kingdom	The ship was sighted whilst on a voyage from Liverpool, Lancashire for Valparaíso, Chile. No further trace, presumed foundered with the loss of all hands.
Emulous	New Zealand	The ship ran aground north of Oamaru and was wrecked.
Louisa	United Kingdom	The steamship ran aground at Ryde, Isle of Wight. She was on a voyage from Bône, Algeria to Dunkirk, Nord, France. She was refloated the next day.
Swan	United Kingdom	The Mersey Flat sank off Bromborough, Cheshire.

== 12 October ==
List of shipwrecks: 12 October 1874
Ship	State	Description
Aurora	United Kingdom	The steamship ran aground at Maassluis, South Holland, Netherlands. She was on a voyage from London to Rotterdam, South Holland. She was refloated and subsequently taken in to Rotterdam.
Beecher Stowe	United Kingdom	The barque struck a sunken wreck and was damaged. She was on a voyage from South Shields, County Durham to Barcelona, Spain. She put back to South Shields in a leaky condition.
Deutsche Kaiser	Germany	The steamship ran aground at the Tre Kronor Battery, Malmö, Sweden. She was on a voyage from Saint Petersburg, Russia to London, United Kingdom. She was refloatted and put in to Copenhagen, Denmark for examination.
Ellida Johanne	Sweden	The ship collided with Johanna Catharina (Sweden) and foundered. Her crew were rescued Ellida Johanne was on a voyage from an English port to Trelleborg.
Glenearn	United Kingdom	The steamship was driven ashore near "Abooderage Point", Egypt. She was on a voyage from London to Singapore, Straits Settlements.
Ida	Russia	The ship was run into by the steamship Vendsyssel (Belgium in the Humber and was damaged. She was on a voyage from Oulu, Grand Duchy of Finland to Hull, Yorkshire, United Kingdom. She was taken in to Hull in a waterlogged condition.
Marie Bertha	Norway	The brig was driven ashore at Vardø.
Maud	United Kingdom	The steamship ran aground off Farø, Denmark. She was on a voyage from Kronstadt, Russia to London.
Minna	United Kingdom	The steamship was driven ashore at Roches Point, County Cork. She was refloated.
Sumus	United Kingdom	The steamship ran aground in the Maas. She was on a voyage from Middlesbrough, Yorkshire to Rotterdam.

== 13 October ==
List of shipwrecks: 13 October 1874
Ship	State	Description
Eliza Jones	United Kingdom	The brig drove ashore at Blyth, Northumberland. She was on a voyage from Hamburg, Germany to Sunderland, County Durham.
Hannah	United Kingdom	The ship was driven ashore at Cézembre, Ille-et-Vilaine, France.
Huntley-Berner	United Kingdom	The barque was driven ashore and wrecked at Lågskär, Åland, Grand Duchy of Finland with the loss of four of her crew. She was on a voyage from Swinemünde, Germany to Gävle, Sweden.
Kaituna	New Zealand	The 47-ton ketch left Akaroa for Oamaru with a crew of four and was last seen off Banks Peninsula. Wreckage thought to have been from the Kaituna was later found off Le Bons Bay, Banks Peninsula, suggesting that she foundered shortly after leaving Akaroa.
Norah Greame	United Kingdom	The ship departed from the River Mersey for Bombay, India. No further trace presumed foundered with the loss of all hands.
Unnamed	Flag unknown	The schooner ran aground in Liverpool Bay.
Unnamed	Flag unknown	The brigantine ran aground on the West Hoyle Bank, in Liverpool Bay.

== 14 October ==
List of shipwrecks: 14 October 1874
Ship	State	Description
Candahar, and Kingsbridge	United Kingdom	The full-rigged ships collided in the English Channel 10 nautical miles (19 km) off The Lizard, Cornwall. Kingsbridge foundered with the loss of eleven of the 31 people on board. She was on a voyage from London to Sydney, New South Wales. Candahar was severely damaged. She was on a voyage from London to Melbourne, Victoria. She put in to Falmouth, Cornwall in a severely leaky condition.
Elizabeth	United Kingdom	The ship was driven ashore at St. Ubes, Portugal.
Ellida	United Kingdom	The steamship ran aground on the Noorsgrund, in the Baltic Sea and was wrecked. Her crew were rescued. She was on a voyage from Luleå, Sweden to London.
Familieus Horab	Flag unknown	The brig was driven ashore on the coast of Suffolk, United Kingdom.
James McGee	United Kingdom	The ship sprang a leak and was beached at Campbeltown, Argyllshire. She was on a voyage from Ardrossan, Ayrshire to Belfast, County Down.
Mary	United Kingdom	The schooner was run into by the barque Bella (United Kingdom) and sank in the Bristol Channel off Lundy Island, Devon. Her crew were rescued by Bella. Mary was on a voyage from Bristol, Gloucestershire to Topsham, Devon.
Posie	United Kingdom	The brigantine struck the Ringfad Rocks, off the coast of County Down and sank. Her crew were rescued. She was on a voyage from Ardglass, County Down to Sagua La Grande, Cuba.
Theda	German Empire	The ship sank at Larvik, Norway. Her crew were rescued.
Tyra	Denmark	The schooner was driven ashore at Egersund, Norway.

== 15 October ==
List of shipwrecks: 15 October 1874
Ship	State	Description
Alfreda, and Volunteer	United Kingdom	The steamship Thames (United Kingdom) collided with the Thames barge Alfreda whilst avoiding a collision with the Thames barge Sisters (United Kingdom) in the River Thames at Erith, Kent. Alfreda sank with the loss of all four people on board. Thames then collided with the Thames barge Volunteer, which also sank. Her crew survived.
Alert	United Kingdom	The fishing smack was run down and sunk in the North Sea by the full-rigged ship Edeith ( Canada) with the loss of two of her six crew. Survivors were rescued by Edeith.
China	United Kingdom	The steamship caught fire at Hong Kong.
Emanuel	Denmark	The schooner was abandoned in the North Sea. She was on a voyage from Riga, Russia to Grangemouth, Stirlingshire, United Kingdom. She came ashore at Lemvig on 5 December.
Evening Star	India	The ship was wrecked at Saugor with the loss of all but three of her crew. She was on a voyage from Calcutta to Moulmein, Burma.
Maria	Italy	The brig foundered at sea with the loss of eleven of her thirteen crew. Survivors were rescued by an American vessel. She was on a voyage from New York, United States to Constantinople, Ottoman Empire.
Susan E Voorhis	United States	The schooner was driven ashore at Diamond Harbour, India. She was on a voyage from Calcutta to Boston, Massachusetts. She was refloated on 28 October.
Tunstall	United Kingdom	The steamship ran aground on the Kralsand, in the North Sea. She was on a voyage from Cuxhaven, Germany to Sunderland, County Durham.

== 16 October ==
List of shipwrecks: 16 October 1874
Ship	State	Description
Buccleuch	United Kingdom	The brig was driven ashore near Ceuta, Spain. She was on a voyage from Antwerp, Belgium to Livorno, Italy. She was refloated and taken in to Gibraltar.
Dunkerquois	France	The steamship was driven ashore on Sandø, Norway. She was on a voyage from Dunkirk, Nord to Kronstadt, Russia.
Evening Star	United Kingdom	The ship foundered at Saugor, India in a typhoon with the loss of all but eleven of her crew.
Gesine	Germany	The lighter ran aground and sank at Bremerhaven.
Grand Duchess	United Kingdom	The ship foundered near the mouth of the Hooghly River in a typhoon with the loss of all hands.
Marquis	United Kingdom	The steamship ran aground in the River Usk. She was on a voyage from Bristol, Gloucestershire to Newport, Monmouthshire.
Melton	United Kingdom	The smack ran aground off Saltfleet, Lincolnshire.
St. Mirren	United Kingdom	The barque departed from Troon, Ayrshire for Demerara, British Honduras. No further trace, presumed foundered with the loss of all seventeen crew.

== 17 October ==
List of shipwrecks: 17 October 1874
Ship	State	Description
Eglantine Esther	France	The brig struck the wreck of Parisine (Flag unknown) off Colón, United States of Colombia and was abandoned. Her crew were rescued.
Hermoso Habañero	Spain	The brig was driven ashore and wrecked near Brook, Isle of Wight, United Kingdom. Her eight crew were rescued by the Brook Lifeboat George and Anne ( Royal National Lifeboat Institution). Hermoso Habañero was on a voyage from Cienfuegos, Cuba to Bremen, Germany.
Lorenzo	United Kingdom	The steamship ran aground off the Poolbeg Lighthouse, Dublin. She was on a voyage from Falmouth, Cornwall to Dublin.
Mark That	United Kingdom	The schooner was driven ashore 2 nautical miles (3.7 km) north of Newbiggin-by-the-Sea, Northumberland. Her crew were rescued. She was on a voyage from Hamburg, Germany to Sunderland, County Durham.
Mary Jane	United Kingdom	The schooner was driven ashore at Rosscarbery, County Cork.
Merlin	United Kingdom	The schooner was run into by the paddle steamer Earl Spencer (United Kingdom) and sank in the Irish Sea. Her three crew were rescued by Earl Spencer. Merlin was on a voyage from Carmarthen to Liverpool, Lancashire.
Norma	United Kingdom	The full-rigged ship sprang a leak and was abandoned in the Grand Banks of Newfoundland. Her crew were rescued by the barque Hercules (Norway). Norma was on a voyage from a British port to Miramichi, New Brunswick, Canada.
Try Again	United Kingdom	The ship was sighted off Helsingør, Denmark whilst on a voyage from Narva, Russia to Dundee, Forfarshire. No further trace, presumed foundered with the loss of all hands.
William Lindsay	United Kingdom	The ship was abandoned 9 nautical miles (17 km) off the Tuskar Rock. Her crew were rescued. She was on a voyage from Leith, Lothian to Bombay, India. She subsequently foundered off Wexford.

== 18 October ==
List of shipwrecks: 18 October 1874
Ship	State	Description
Annie	United Kingdom	The brig ran aground on the West Hoyle Bank, in Liverpool Bay. She was refloated with the assistance of the Point of Ayr Lifeboat.
Go Ahead	Germany	The barque caught fire off Cape Sestos, Ottoman Empire. She was on a voyage from Liverpool, Lancashire, United Kingdom to Constantinople, Ottoman Empire. She was towed in to the Dardanelles, where she was scuttled. Go Ahead was refloated and towed in to Copenhagen.

== 19 October ==
List of shipwrecks: 19 October 1874
Ship	State	Description
Alma	United Kingdom	The ship was driven ashore at "Hammerbak". She was on a voyage from Hull, Yorkshire to Stockholm, Sweden.
Annechina Hermina	Netherlands	The koff was wrecked near Thisted, Denmark. Her crew were rescued. She was on a voyage from Memel, Germany to Leeuwarden, Friesland.
Industry	United Kingdom	The ship was destroyed by fire. Her crew took to the boats; they were rescued the next day by the barque Citaos (Flag unknown). Industry was on a voyage from the River Tyne to Bombay, india.
King Leopold	United Kingdom	The steamship departed from South Shields, County Durham for Pillau, Germany. Last sighted 15 nautical miles (28 km) east of Tynemouth Castle, Northumberland. Presumed subsequently foundered with the loss of all twenty crew.
Transit	United Kingdom	The steamship caught fire at Grimsby, Lincolnshire. She was on a voyage from Dieppe, Seine-Inférieure, France to Grimsby.
Vine	United Kingdom	The ship ran aground in the Menai Strait. She was on a voyage from Liverpool, Lancashire to Caernarfon. She was refloated and found to be leaky.

== 20 October ==
List of shipwrecks: 20 October 1874
Ship	State	Description
Budget	United Kingdom	The schooner was run into by a brig and sank at Greenock, Renfrewshire. Her crew were rescued.
Dolphin	United Kingdom	The yacht was driven ashore and wrecked at Broughty Ferry, Forfarshire.
Dunrobin	United Kingdom	The schooner was abandoned off Peterhead, Aberdeenshire. Her five crew were rescued by the Peterhead Lifeboat. She was on a voyage from Leith, Lothian to Wick, Caithness.
Elizabeth and Margaret	United Kingdom	The ship was sighted off Flamborough Head, Yorkshire whilst on a voyage from Middlesbrough, Yorkshire to Newport, Monmouthshire. No further trace, presumed foundered with the loss of all hands.
Euxine	United Kingdom	The ship was driven ashore in the Clyde at Helensburgh, Dunbartonshire.
Flying Fish	United Kingdom	The yacht was driven ashore and wrecked at Broughty Ferry.
Maria	United Kingdom	The smack was driven ashore and wrecked at Lynmouth, Devon.
Marinham	United Kingdom	The barque was abandoned by her crew.
Reindeer	United Kingdom	The schooner sank off Bardsey Island, Pembrokeshire. Her crew were rescued. She was on a voyage from Port Dinorwic, Caernarfonshire to London.
Taurus	United Kingdom	The schooner was wrecked at Hythe, Kent.
Viceroy	United Kingdom	The steamship departed from Hull, Yorkshire for Kronstadt, Russia. No further trace, presumed foundered with the loss of all 25 crew.
Wild Rose	United Kingdom	The tug was blown onto the Black Middens, in the North Sea off the coast of County Durham. She was refloated.
William and Ann	United Kingdom	The ship was driven ashore and wrecked near Portreath, Cornwall. Her crew were rescued.
William and Mary	United Kingdom	The sloop was driven ashore and wrecked at Porthleven, Cornwall. Her crew were rescued. She was on a voyage from Porthleven to Plymouth, Devon.
Four unnamed vessels	United Kingdom	Two wherries were blown out to sea from North Shields, one of them sank. Tow other wherries sank at North Shields.

== 21 October ==
List of shipwrecks: 21 October 1874
Ship	State	Description
Adgillas	United Kingdom	The barque sprang a leak and foundered in the Irish Sea 18 nautical miles (33 km) off the Morecambe Bay Lightship ( Trinity House) with the loss of a crew member. Survivors reached the lighstship in the longboat and were rescued on 23 October by Prince Charlie (United Kingdom).
Aid	United Kingdom	The brig ran aground on the Shoebury Sand, in the Thames Estuary. She was on a voyage from South Shields, County Durham to London. She was refloated with the assistance of a tug.
Ailsa, and Annie Ada	United Kingdom	The barque Ailsa was driven from her moorings at Ayr. She collided with the schooner Annie Ada. Both vessels were severely damaged.
Albertine, and Sunbeam	United Kingdom	The schooners were driven together at Gourock, Renfrewshire and were both severely damaged.
Anna	Germany	The ship was damaged in a gale at Gourock.
Anna Lazzarevich	Austria-Hungary	The brig caught fire off Cape Helles, Ottoman Empire and was towed in to the Dardanelles. She was on a voyage from Marseille, Bouches-du-Rhône, France to Constantinople, Ottoman Empire.
Ann Lovitt	United Kingdom	The ship was driven ashore at Ardrossan, Ayrshire.
Antelope, and Florence Treat	United Kingdom	The barque Florence Treat was driven from her moorings at Glasgow, Renfrewshire. She collided with the paddle steamer Gael, the steamship Arklow, the ship Guy Fawkes, the steamships Laurel and Albion, the ships Wasp, Inveraray Castle and Cygnet, the schooner Eneas, the ships Atlas (all United Kingdom) and Morning Star ( Canada) and the schooner Antelope, which was severely damaged.
Assyria	Canada	The barque was driven from her moorings at Glasgow and collided with the schooner Ellida (Denmark), the brig Eugene (France), the steamship Severn and the ship Earl of Carlisle (both United Kingdom).
Audax	United Kingdom	The ship was driven ashore at Helensburgh, Dunbartonshire.
Belle Star	Canada	The brigantine was partley abandoned off Troon. Five of her eight crew were rescued by the Troon Lifeboat, three remaining aboard. She was subsequently driven ashore at Troon, Ayrshire. She was on a voyage from Londonderry, United Kingdom to Troon.
Bessemer	United Kingdom	The paddle steamer was driven ashore at Hull, Yorkshire. She was refloated.
Bridget Smith	United Kingdom	The schooner was driven into the brig Caroline Henrika (Germany) and sank at Greenock. Her crew were rescued by Caroline Henrika. Bridget Smith was refloated on 24 December and taken in to Greenock for repairs.
Britannia	United Kingdom	The brig was driven ashore near Shoreham-by-Sea, Sussex.
British India	United Kingdom	The full-rigged ship broke from her moorings at North Shields, Northumberland, collided with the schooner Boyne, the tugs British Warrior, Lass O'Gowrie, Rapid, Test, West Dock (all United Kingdom) and training ship HMS Castor (Royal Navy) and ran aground on the Low Lights Sands, in the North Sea off the coast of Northumberland. She was refloated with the assistance of a number of tugs and towed in to North Shields.
Boyne	United Kingdom	The schooner was run into by the full-rigged ship British India and broke from her moorings at North Shields. She subsequently ran aground on the Low Lights Sands. She was refloated with the assistance of a number of tugs and towed in to North Shields.
Caledonia	United Kingdom	The smack was driven onto the Dorling Sandbank, off the coast of Argyllshire.
Camden	United Kingdom	The schooner was abandoned off Portrush, County Antrim. Her four crew were rescued by the Portrush Lifeboat.
Camelia	United Kingdom	The smack was driven ashore at Campbeltown, Argyllshire.
Caroline	Sweden	The schooner was driven ashore at Fredrikshavn, Denmark. SHe was on a voyage from Kristiansand, Norway to Randers, Denmark.
Chusan	United Kingdom	The paddle steamer struck the Crinan Rock, off the coast of Ayrshire and broke in two with the loss of fifteen of the 52 people on board. Six of the survivors were rescued by the Ardrossan Lifeboat. The forward section was taken in to Ardrossan; the stern section sank. Chusan was on a voyage from Waterford to Glasgow, or from Glasgow to Shanghai, China. The stern section was refloated on 5 May 1875.
Cognac Packet	United Kingdom	The brig capsized at Jarrow, County Durham. She was later righted.
Commerce	United Kingdom	The brigantine foundered in the North Sea off Flamborough Head, Yorkshire. Her crew were rescued.
Crown Jewel, and Star of Hope	United States; United Kingdom	The barque Crown Jewel was driven into the brig Star of Hope in The Downs. Both vessels were severely damaged. Crown Jewel was on a voyage from New York to Bremen, Germany.
Den Raske Bonde	Norway	The ship foundered off Marstrand, Sweden. Her crew were rescued. She was on a voyage from Newcastle upon Tyne to Randers.
Devonshire	United Kingdom	The brig ran aground off Deal, Kent. She was refloated and taken in to The Downs.
Dunrobin	United Kingdom	The schooner was abandoned off the coast of Aberdeenshire. Her six crew were rescued by the Peterhead Lifeboat.
Dunvegan Castle	United Kingdom	The steamship was driven ashore at Dunvegan, Isle of Skye, Outer Hebrides. She was on a voyage from Glasgow to Dunvegan. She heeled over and sank on 21 November during an attempt to refloat her. She was refloated on 1 September 1875. Dunvegan Castle departed from the Isle of Skye under tow on 24 October 1875, arriving at Greenock, Renfrewshire a week later. Subsequently repaired and returned to service.
E. C. White	United Kingdom	The brigantine was driven ashore and wrecked 1 nautical mile (1.9 km) north of Laxey, Isle of Man with the loss of four of her seven crew. She was on a voyage from Lisbon, Portugal to Ardrossan.
Eli	Russia	The schooner ran aground on the Low Lights Sands. She was refloated with the assistance of a number of tugs and towed in to North Shields.
Eliza Ann	United Kingdom	The Mersey Flat was struck by the rotating propeller of Republic (United Kingdom), and capsized in the River Mersey off Tranmere, Cheshire. Her crew were rescued. Eliza Ann was subsequently taken in to Tranmere.
Ellida	Sweden	The schooner was driven ashore on "Ragoe". She was on a voyage from Stockholm to Loviisa, Grand Duchy of Finland. She was refloated with assistance and resumed her voyage.
Emma	Flag unknown	The brig capsized at Cardiff, Glamorgan, United Kingdom.
Emma Eden	(United Kingdom of Great Britain and Ireland) Guernsey	The schooner ran aground on the Barnard Sand, in the North Sea off the coast of Suffolk and was wrecked. Her six crew were rescued by the Kessingland Lifeboat Bolton ( Royal National Lifeboat Institution). Emma Eden was on a voyage from Newcastle upon Tyne, Northumberland to Guernsey.
Euxine	United Kingdom	The full-rigged ship was driven from her moorings at Greenock. She collided with HMRC Sylph ( Board of Customs) and was subsequently anchored at Ardmore.
Franklin	Norway	The barque was driven ashore at Park Point, Caernarfonshire, United Kingdom. Her twelve crew were rescued. She was on a voyage from New York to Liverpool, Lancashire, United Kingdom.
Frederick	United Kingdom	The Mersey Flat was driven ashore and sank at Hoylake, Cheshire. Her crew were rescued.
George	United Kingdom	The brigantine was driven ashore 2 nautical miles (3.7 km) north of Workington, Cumberland. She was on a voyage from Drogheda, County Louth to Workington.
George	United Kingdom	The ship was driven ashore at Irvine, Ayrshire.
George Booth	United Kingdom	The ship was driven ashore at Helensburgh.
Georgina	United Kingdom	The brigantine was driven from her moorings at Ayr. She capsized and was wrecked.
Glenville	United Kingdom	The barquentine ran aground on the Barnard Sand. She was on a voyage from Sunderland, County Durham to Messina, Sicily, Italy. She was refloated with assistance from the Lowestoft Lifeboat and the tug Rainbow (United Kingdom) and towed in to Lowestoft, Suffolk. Being severely leaky, she was beached.
Golden Gleam	United Kingdom	The schooner was beached at Ayr.
Haabet	Denmark	The yacht was driven ashore at Jerup.
Harriet	United Kingdom	The schooner was driven ashore at Helensburgh. She caught fire the next day and was burnt out.
Hope	United Kingdom	The sloop was driven ashore and caught fire in Gare Loch.
Immanuel	Norway	The schooner was driven ashore at Jerup. She was on a voyage from Sunderland to Aarhus, Denmark.
James	United Kingdom	The ship was driven ashore at Cairnryan, Wigtownshire. She was on a voyage from Ardrossan to Belfast, County Antrim.
Josephine	France	The schooner sank at Girvan, Ayrshire with the loss of all hands.
Kate	United Kingdom	The brig was driven ashore and wrecked near Trelleborg, Sweden. She was on a voyage from Memel, Germany to Belfast and/or Drogheda, County Louth.
Lalla Rookh	United Kingdom	The yacht was driven ashore and wrecked in Gare Loch.
Liberal	United Kingdom	The brigantine was wrecked on the Woolpack Sands, in The Wash off Hunstanton Norfolk. Her five crew were rescued by the Hunstanton Lifeboat. She was on a voyage from Poole, Dorset to Wisbech, Cambridgeshire.
Linnfern	United Kingdom	The schooner was driven ashore at Airnish Point, Isle of Lewis, Outer Hebrides. She was on a voyage from Riga, Russia to Liverpool. She was refloated.
Louis A. Surette	United Kingdom	The brigantine was driven against the quayside at Ayr and was severely damaged.
Maju	United Kingdom	The barque sank about 12 miles (19 km) west of Stornoway, Isle of Lewis in a gale with the loss of all 24 crew. She was on a voyage from Dundee, Forfarshire to Rangoon, British Burma. She was identified when seven bodies, three lower masts and a piece of the vessel's stern were washed ashore.
Maranham	United Kingdom	The barque was run into by the schooner Isabel (United Kingdom) at Greenock and was wrecked. Her crew were rescued by Isabel. Maranham was on a voyage from Glasgow to Port Natal, Cape Colony. She was towed in to Greenock by the tug Stork (United Kingdom).
Margaret Potter	United Kingdom	The ship was driven ashore at the mouth of the River Philorth, Aberdeenshire. She was on a voyage from Rosehearty, Aberdeenshire to Harburg, Germany. She subsequently broke up.
Mary and Jane	United Kingdom	The smack was lost in Loch Eriboll. Her crew were rescued. She was on a voyage from Thurso, Caithness to Stornoway.
Mary	United Kingdom	The paddle steamer broke in two and sank in the Atlantic Ocean (46°28′N 8°11′W) with the loss of three her nineteen crew. Survivors were rescued by the brig Widar (Norway) and the brigantine Lophena ( Canada). Mary was on a voyage from Glasgow to Trinidad.
Moir	United Kingdom	The schooner was abandoned off Kinnaird Head, Aberdeenshire. Her five crew were rescued by the Fraserburgh Lifeboat Charlotte ( Royal National Lifeboat Institution). Moir was on a voyage from Portsoy, Aberdeenshire to Newcastle upon Tyne. She was subsequently driven ashore and wrecked at Fraserburgh.
Ocean	United Kingdom	The schooner was driven ashore and severely damaged on Holy Island, in the Firth of Clyde. She was refloated.
Pandora	United Kingdom	The schooner ran aground and sank on the Barnard Sand. Her five crew were rescued by the Southwold Lifeboat and a tug. She was on a voyage from Hartlepool, County Durham to Portsmouth, Hampshire.
P. J. Nevius	United Kingdom	The ship was driven against the quayside at Ayr and was severely damaged.
Quebec	United Kingdom	The brig was driven from her moorings at North Shields and was damaged.
Reine, or René	France	The full-rigged ship was driven ashore on Burial Isle, County Down, United Kingdom. She was on a voyage from Ardrossan to Saint-Malo, Ille-et-Vilaine.
Sevogal	Germany	The brig was driven ashore and wrecked at Lemvig. She was on a voyage from Piteå, Sweden to Hull.
Sourabaya	United Kingdom	The floating dock was driven ashore at Helensburgh. She was refloated on 24 December and towed to Greenock for repair.
St. George	Russia	The lighter struck an anchor and sank at Taganrog.
St. Tudwall	United Kingdom	The ship was driven ashore near Porthdinllaen, Caernarfonshire.
Sudwall	United Kingdom	The steamship was driven ashore at Port William, Wigtownshire.
Triumph	United Kingdom	The steamship was driven out to sea from the River Tyne with only two crew aboard. They managed to take her back into the River Tyne.
Tya	Sweden	The steamship ran aground at Kalmar. She was on a voyage from Kalmar to Stockholm.
Uncas	Norway	The brigantine was driven ashore at Girvan. Her nine crew were rescued by the Girvan Lifeboat. She was on a voyage from Stavanger to Venice, Italy.
Venture	United Kingdom	The smack was driven ashore and severely damaged at Campbeltown.
Wein Hohenfelde	Germany	The ship was driven onto the Canada Wall. She was on a voyage from Truxillo, British Honduras. She was refloated with assistance from the tug Great Emperor (United Kingdom) and towed in to Liverpool.
Wild Rose	United Kingdom	The paddle tug was driven ashore at Tynemouth, Northumberland. She was refloated.
Unnamed	United Kingdom	The schooner collided with a brig and sank at Greenock, Renfrewshire.
Unnamed	United Kingdom	The ship foundered in the North Sea off Cullercoats, Northumberland with the loss of all hands.
Two unnamed vessels	Flags unknown	The brigs ran aground on the Maplin Sands, in the North Sea off the coast of Essex.
Unnamed	Flag unknown	The ship ran aground on the Gordon Flats, in Liverpool Bay.
Unnamed	Flag unknown	The ship ran aground on the Little Burbo Bank, in Liverpool Bay.
Two unnamed vessels	United Kingdom	A gabbart and a yacht were driven ashore in Gare Loch.
Unnamed	United Kingdom	The schooner was driven ashore at Helensburgh.
Unnamed	United Kingdom	The schooner was driven ashore on Jura.
Unnamed	United Kingdom	The schooner was driven ashore at Kilmin, Argyllshire.
Unnamed	United Kingdom	The barque was driven ashore in Malltraeth Bay. Her crew survived.
Unnamed	(United Kingdom of Great Britain and Ireland) Isle of Man	The fishing lugger was driven ashore at Port Erin. She was refloated.
Unnamed	United Kingdom	The schooner was driven ashore at Campbeltown .
Unnamed	United Kingdom	The schooner was wrecked on the Voglesand, in the North Sea off the German coast.
Two unnamed vessels	Flags unknown	The ships were driven ashore at Fredrikshavn.
Unnamed	United Kingdom	The barque foundered in the North Sea 40 nautical miles (74 km) off the British coast with the loss of all hands.

== 22 October ==
List of shipwrecks: 22 October 1874
Ship	State	Description
Albert'	Germany	The ship was driven ashore at the Little Orme Head, Caernarfonshire, United Kingdom. Her crew were rescued. She was on a voyage from Corpus Christi, Texas, United States to Liverpool, Lancashire, United Kingdom.
Agnes	United Kingdom	The fishing smack was driven ashore and wrecked in Loch Hourn.
Annette	Norway	The ship was driven ashore at Larvik, Norway.
Antwerpen	Belgium	The tug collided with the steamship Gassendi (United Kingdom) and sank in the Scheldt at Antwerp.
Brick	United Kingdom	The ketch was abandoned in the North Sea off the coast of Aberdeenshire. Her three crew were rescued by the Fraserburgh Lifeboat.
Colleen Bawn	United Kingdom	The steamship was beached near Liverpool with assistance from the tugs Lord Athlumney and Universe. She was on a voyage from Drogheda, County Louth to Liverpool.
Curlew	United Kingdom	The smack was driven ashore on the Holy Isle, in the Firth of Clyde. She was on a voyage from Glasgow, Renfrewshire to Belfast, County Antrim.
Elizabeth	United Kingdom	The schooner was driven ashore on Islay. Her crew were rescued. She was on a voyage from Carrickfergus, County Antrim to Ballysadare, County Sligo.
Frederic and Annie	Denmark	The schooner foundered off the coast of Essex, United Kingdom. Her crew survived. She was on a voyage from Aarhus to Rochester, Kent, United Kingdom.
Hampshire	United Kingdom	The steamship collided with the steamship Prinds Soltykoff (Flag unknown) and sank at Cardiff, Glamorgan.
Harkaway	United Kingdom	The brig was driven ashore near Shoreham-by-Sea.
Hey Mi Nannie	United Kingdom	The smack was driven ashore on the Holy Isle.
Hoffnung	Flag unknown	The brig was driven ashore and wrecked at Larvik.
Indien	France	The brig was driven ashore and wrecked at Wells-next-the-Sea, Norfolk, United Kingdom. Her six crew were rescued by the Wells Lifeboat. She was on a voyage from Newcastle upon Tyne, Northumberland to Bordeaux, Gironde.
Janet	United Kingdom	The fishing smack sank in Loch Duich. Her crew survived.
Janet Thomas	United Kingdom	The fishing smack sank at Kyleakin, Isle of Skye. Her crew were rescued.
Jessie Catherine	United Kingdom	The fishing smack was driven ashore in Loch Hourn.
Judith Milbanke	United Kingdom	The ship collided with the barque Enterprise (Norway) and sank off Harwich, Essex. Her crew were rescued by Enterprise. Judith Milbanke was on a voyage from Whitby, Yorkshire to London.
Lady Fielding	United Kingdom	The schooner was driven ashore on the coast of Argyllshire opposite the Holy Isle. She was refloated on 31 October.
Lene Marie	Denmark	The schooner was driven ashore at Egmond aan Zee, North Holland, Netherlands. Her crew were rescued. She was on a voyage from Narva, Russia to Schiedam, South Holland, Netherlands.
Lord Howe	United Kingdom	The ship was driven ashore and wrecked at Shoreham-by-Sea.
Louise Charlotte	United Kingdom	The ship was driven ashore and severely damaged near Tønsberg, Norway. She was refloated.
Maggie	United Kingdom	The steam yacht was driven ashore at Drumfin, Isle of Mull. She was refloated and taken in to Tobermory.
Sarah M. Smith	United Kingdom	The barque ran aground on Taylor's Bank, in Liverpool Bay. She was on a voyage from Saint John's, Newfoundland Colony to Liverpool, or from Galveston, Texas to Barrow-in-Furness, Lancashire. She was refloated with the assistance of the tug Kingfisher (United Kingdom) and towed in to Liverpool.
Unnamed	Flag unknown	The ship was driven ashore in the Nieuw Diep.
Unnamed	United Kingdom	The hospital ship sank at Lowestoft, Suffolk.
Three unnamed vessels	United Kingdom	The fishing smacks were driven ashore in Loch Hourn.
Unnamed	United Kingdom	The fishing smack sank in Loch Hourn.
Unnamed	United Kingdom	The fishing boat was wrecked on Shapinsay, Orkney Islands.
Two unnamed vessels	United Kingdom	The schooners were driven ashore in Water Sound, Orkney Islands.
Unnamed	United Kingdom	The barque was driven ashore in Widewall Bay.

== 23 October ==
List of shipwrecks: 23 October 1874
Ship	State	Description
Alert	United Kingdom	The schooner ran aground and was wrecked on the Menem Sand, in the Elbe near Cuxhaven, Germany.
Alpha	United Kingdom	The schooner ran aground on the Robben Platte, in the North Sea off the German coast. She was refloated on 12 November and assisted in to the Geeste.
Caroline	United Kingdom	The ship was driven ashore. She was on a voyage from Cardiff, Glamorgan to Copenhagen, Denmark. She was refloated and put back to Cardiff in a leaky condition.
Curlew	United Kingdom	The schooner was driven ashore at Lindisfarne.
Gertrude	Germany	The schooner was driven ashore and wrecked on Terschelling, Friesland, Netherlands. Her crew were rescued. She was on a voyage from Riga, Russia to Harlingen, Friesland.
Helene Gesina	Netherlands	The schooner was abandoned in the North Sea. Her crew were rescued. She was on a voyage from Riga to Delfzijl, Groningen.
Johanna Elizabeth	Netherlands	The ship was driven ashore and wrecked at Lemvig, Denmark. Her crew were rescued. She was on a voyage from Narva, Russia to Harlingen, Friesland.
Juno	United Kingdom	The ship was severely damaged in a typhoon. She was on a voyage from Hong Kong to Yantai, China. She put back to Hong Kong but was consequently condemned.
Marequita	Germany	The barque was abandoned 50 nautical miles (93 km) east of the Dogger Bank. Her ten crew were rescued by the smack England's Glory (United Kingdom).
Mary Rosanna	United Kingdom	The schooner was deiven ashore at Rhubegg Point, Renfrewshire.
Nicholas Smith	United Kingdom	The brig was driven ashore at Bawdsey, Suffolk. She was on a voyage from Hartlepool, County Durham to London. She was refloated and taken in to Harwich, Essex in a leaky condition.
Skandia	Denmark	The schooner caught fire and was beached on "Gillsholm". She was on a voyage from an English port to Copenhagen.
Stourbridge	United Kingdom	The ship was driven ashore at Egmond aan Zee, North Holland, Netherlands. Her crew were rescued. She was on a voyage from Macduff, Aberdeenshire to Rotterdam, South Holland, Netherlands.
Van Dyck	France	The barque ran aground on the Haaks Sandbank, in the North Sea off the Dutch coast and was severely damaged. She was on a voyage from Riga, Russia to Havre de Grâce, Seine-Inférieure She was refloated and taken in to the Nieuw Diep.
Two unnamed vessels	United Kingdom	A smack and a schooner were driven ashore at Lindisfarne.

== 24 October ==
List of shipwrecks: 24 October 1874
Ship	State	Description
Alberdina	Germany	The brig was driven ashore at Borkum. Her crew were rescued.
Alegro	Norway	The barque was wrecked near Mandal with the loss of all but one of her crew. She was on a voyage from Boulogne, Pas-de-Calais, France to Drammen.
Alliance	Germany	The brig was taken in to Tønning in a sinking condition. She was on a voyage from Riga, Russia to Hartlepool, County Durham, United Kingdom.
Alpha	Germany	The ship ran aground on the Robbenplatte. Her crew were rescued. She was on a voyage from Königsberg to Brake.
Andrea Padrea	Italy	The brig was beached at Cagliari, Sicily. She was on a voyage from Bône, Algeria to Philadelphia, Pennsylvania, United States. She was refloated on 25 October.
Caroline	Denmark	The schooner was abandoned in the North Sea. Her crew were rescued. She was on a voyage from Bandholm, Denmark to Hull, Yorkshire, United Kingdom.
Clara	Germany	The ship put into Gothenburg, Sweden in a waterlogged condition. She was on a voyage from Newcastle upon Tyne, Northumberland, United Kingdom to Swinemünde.
Cyclop	Netherlands	The steamship was discovered abandoned in the Baltic Sea by the steamship Hermann (Germany). She was taken in tow but sank at 11°00′N 17°40′E).
Dr. Hansen	Flag unknown	The brig was driven ashore in the Strait of Lemaire. Her crew were rescued. She was on a voyage from the Rio Grande to Valparaíso, Chile. She was a total loss.
Eberhardine	Germany	The ship was driven ashore at Lemvig, Denmark. Her crew were rescued. She was on a voyage from Arendal, Norway to Großefehn.
Harriet	United Kingdom	The schooner was driven ashore at Greenock, Renfrewshire.
Helene	Sweden	The steamship foundered off Lemvig with the loss of all on board, about 21 lives. She was on a voyage from Gävle to Hull.
Hendrika	Netherlands	The ship was driven ashore on Spiekeroog, Germany. She was on a voyage from Saint Petersburg, Russia to Harlingen, Friesland.
Henriette	Norway	The barque was driven ashore at "Vilsen". She was on a voyage from Tevedestrand to London, United Kingdom.
Ida	Germany	The ship was driven ashore near Lemvig. Her crew were rescued. She was on a voyage from Norway to Vegesack.
Ivestone	United Kingdom	The brig capsized in the Skaggerak. Her eight crew were rescued the next day by Otto Linco (Germany). Ivestone was on a voyage from Kotka, Grand Duchy of Finland to an English port. She was taken in to Strömstad, Sweden in a derelict condition on 26 October.
Julie	Norway	The schooner was driven ashore near Lemvig. Her crew were rescued. She was on a voyage from Riga, Russia to Harlingen.
Lucerne	United States	The ship struck the Ariadne Rocks and was damaged. Being leaky, she was beached. She was on a voyage from Russell to Niuzhuang, China.
Lucy Frances	United Kingdom	The ship was driven ashore near Harlingen. She was on a voyage from Oulu, Grand Duchy of Finland to Harlingen.
Margaret	United Kingdom	The ship ran aground at Campbeltown, Argyllshire. She was on a voyage from Paisley, Renfrewshire to Belfast, County Antrim.
Meta et Max	Flag unknown	The ship ran aground on the Stillsand. She was on a voyage from Härnösand, Sweden to Hull. She was refloated and towed in to Strömstad, Sweden.
Prestatyn	United Kingdom	The ship ran aground and sank at Ellesmere Port, Cheshire. She was refloated.
Suez	Italy	The brig ran aground at "Galala Point", Ottoman Empire. She was on a voyage from Cardiff, Glamorgan, United Kingdom to Constantinople, Ottoman Empire. She was refloated and towed in to Gallipoli, Ottoman Empire.
Valkyrien	Sweden	The ship ran aground in the Flekkefjord. She was on a voyage from Hudiksvall to London. She was refloated and taken in to Kristiansund, Norway in a leaky condition.
Unnamed	United Kingdom	The schooner was driven ashore in the Holy Loch.
Unnamed	Russia	The coaster was run into by the steamship Quito (United Kingdom) and sank in the Gulf of Finland with the loss to two of the five people on board. Survivors were rescued by Quito.
Unnamed	Flag unknown	The barque foundered in the North Sea off Filey, Yorkshire.

== 25 October ==
List of shipwrecks: 25 October 1874
Ship	State	Description
Active	United Kingdom	The schooner was wrecked on the Annot Bank, off Montrose, Forfarshire. Her five crew were rescued by the Montrose Lifeboat Mincing Lane ( Royal National Lifeboat Institution ). Active was on a voyage from Sunderland, County Durham to Montrose.
Ambassador	United Kingdom	The ship was abandoned in the Dogger Bank. Her ten crew were rescued by the smack Vulcan (United Kingdom). Ambassador was on a voyage form Danzig, Germany to London. She came ashore at Lemvig, Denmark on 11 November.
Ellen	Sweden	The schooner was discovered derelict at sea and was beached at Thisted, Denmark.
Galeed	United Kingdom	The steamship ran aground in the Danube.
Glenathron, and Zena	United Kingdom	The steamship Zena collided with the barque Glenathron in the River Mersey and was beached. She was on a voyage from Gibraltar to Liverpool, Lancashire. Glenathron was beached at Tranmere, Cheshire. She was on a voyage from Liverpool to Valparaíso, Chile. She was refloated the next day and towed in to Liverpool.
Glenfaba	(United Kingdom of Great Britain and Ireland) Isle of Man	The schooner was driven ashore at Kirk Bride. She was on a voyage from Whitehaven, Cumberland to Peel. She became a wreck on 29 October.
Hugh Taylor	United Kingdom	The steamship ran aground in the Danube.
Jean Campbell	United Kingdom	The schooner sank at Belfast, County Antrim. She was refloated on 29 October.
Lily	Norway	The brig ran aground at Scarborough, Yorkshire. She was on a voyage from Porsgrund to Hull, Yorkshire. She was subsequently condemned and dismantled.
Marmion	United Kingdom	The ship departed from the River Tyne for Buenos Aires, Argentina. No further trace, presumed foundered with the loss of all hands.
Oceanus	Netherlands	The ship ran aground. She was on a voyage from Probolinggo, Netherlands East Indies to a Dutch port. She was refloated and towed in to Jakarta, Netherlands East Indies in a leaky condition.
Orwell	United Kingdom	The steamship ran aground at Redgate Hard. She was on a voyage from Harwich, Essex to Ipswich, Suffolk. She was refloated and completed her voyage.
Otolita	Denmark	The schooner was driven ashore at Thisted in a capsized condition.
Penelope	Sweden	The ship was abandoned in the North Sea. Her crew were rescued by Charlotte (Flag unknown). Penelope was on a voyage from Pori, Grand Duchy of Finland to Cartagena, Spain. Subsequently discovered derelict, she was taken in to "Blaavand Oxby Strand".
Ranger	United Kingdom	The smack was driven ashore and wrecked at Atherfield, Isle of Wight. Her crew were rescued. She was on a voyage from Llanelly, Glamorgan to Southampton, Hampshire.

== 26 October ==
List of shipwrecks: 26 October 1874
Ship	State	Description
'Alster, and Annie	United Kingdom	The steamships collided in the Humber and were both severely damaged. Alster was on a voyage from Antwerp, Belgium to Hull, Yorkshire. Annie was on a voyage from Antwerp to Goole, Yorkshire.
Antje	Netherlands	The ship was abandoned in the North Sea. All on board were rescued by Jacoba Lucretia (Netherlands). Antje was on a voyage from Hammerfest, Norway to Rotterdam, South Holland.
Askoy	United States	The ship ran aground on the Korsa Reef, in the Baltic Sea off the Swedish coast. She was on a voyage from New York to Stockholm, Sweden. She was refloated and taken in to Stockholm for repairs.
Betty	Sweden	The schooner ran aground on the Stoney Binks, in the North Sea off the mouth of the Humber. She was on a voyage from Cimbritshamn to Skutskär. She was refloated and assisted in to Grimsby, Lincolnshire, United Kingdom in a waterlogged condition.
Christian	Sweden	The schooner was wrecked at "Hollandswaders", Sweden with the loss of three of her crew. She was on a voyage from Hartlepool, County Durham, United Kingdom to Höganäs, Sweden.
C. P.	France	The barque was wrecked in Struys Bay with some loss of life. She was on a voyage from Bimlipatam, India to Marseille, Bouches-du-Rhône.
Eendraght	Netherlands	The galiot was driven ashore on the west coast of Jutland.
Heinrich III	Germany	The schooner was driven ashore and wrecked on Læsø, Denmark.
Jeanne	France	The steamship was wrecked at Deva, Spain. Her crew were rescued She was on a voyage from Bayonne, Pyrénées-Atlantiques to Gijón, Spain.
Margaretha Henderika	Netherlands	The schooner was driven ashore and wrecked on Amrum, Germany. She was on a voyage from Danzig, Germany to Amsterdam, North Holland. She was refloated on 29 October and towed in to Wyk auf Föhr, Germany.
Margarethe	Germany	The ship was driven ashore on Anholt, Denmark. She was on a voyage from Peterhead, Aberdeenshire, United Kingdom to Stettin.
Pierre Desirée	United Kingdom	The smack capsized and sank at Plymouth, Devon, United Kingdom.
Simcoe	United Kingdom	The ship ran aground in the Clyde at Greenock, Renfrewshire.
Seevogel	Germany	The brig was driven ashore and wrecked at Larvik, Norway. She was on a voyage from Piteå, Sweden to Hull.
Windsor Castle	United Kingdom	The steamship caught fire at sea and put in to A Coruña, Spain. She was on a voyage from London to the Cape of Good Hope, Cape Colony.

== 27 October ==
List of shipwrecks: 27 October 1874
Ship	State	Description
Aleppa	United Kingdom	The steamship ran aground at Syros, Greece. She was on a voyage from Liverpool, Lancashire to Constantinople, Ottoman Empire. She was refloated the next day and resumed her voyage.
Alphonso	Sweden	The ship was driven ashore at Vardø, Norway with the loss of a crew member. She was on a voyage from Söderhamn to London, United Kingdom.
Folke	Netherlands	The schooner struck a sunken rock in the Gulf of Squillace and was damaged. She was on a voyage from Antwerp, Belgium to Trieste. She put in to Malta on 5 November in a leaky condition.
Grandville	France	The ship struck the wreck of Kerschel (Flag unknown) at Maldonado, Uruguay and was wrecked. She was on a voyage from Bordeaux, Gironde to Buenos Aires, Argentina.
Lema	France	The steamship was lost off Cape Finisterre, Spain. Her crew were rescued.
William and Ann	United Kingdom	The schooner was driven ashore and wrecked in Mount's Bay.

== 28 October ==
List of shipwrecks: 28 October 1874
Ship	State	Description
Amelia	United Kingdom	The steamship ran aground on the Crow Rock, off the coast of Pembrokeshire. Some of her crew were taken off by the pilot boat No. 6 (United Kingdom). The Milford Haven Lifeboat rescued eight others. Amelia was on a voyage from Liverpool, Lancashire to Cardiff, Glamorgan. She broke in two and was a total loss.
Constantine	United Kingdom	The steamship ran aground at Höganäs, Sweden. She was on a voyage from Cardiff to Copenhagen, Denmark. She was refloated and resumed her voyage.
Henry	United Kingdom	The schooner foundered off Carnsore Point, County Wexford. Her crew reached shore in a boat. She was on a voyage from Wexford to Gloucester.
Mariquita	Germany	The barque foundered in the North Sea 50 nautical miles (93 km) east of the Dogger Bank. Her crew were rescued by the smack England's Glory. Mariquita was on a voyage from South Shields, County Durham, United Kingdom to Hamburg.
Mary S. Parker	United States	The barque was wrecked on the coast of Patagonia, Argentina. Her crew were rescued by Rossalls (United Kingdom). Mary S. Parker was on a voyage from New York to Callao, Peru.
Palestine	United Kingdom	The barque was abaondoned in the North Sea. Her crew were rescued by the steamship Iceland (United Kingdom). Palestine was on a voyage from Quebec City, Canada to South Shields.
Truant	United Kingdom	The ship departed from Dartmouth, Devon for Saint John, New Brunswick, Canada. No further trace, presumed foundered with the loss of all hands.

== 29 October ==
List of shipwrecks: 29 October 1874
Ship	State	Description
Cordelia	United Kingdom	The ship ran aground on the Salthouse Bank, in the Irish Sea off the coast of Lancashire. She was on a voyage from Dieppe, Seine-Inférieure, France to Runcorn, Cheshire. She was refloated and taken in to Lytham St. Annes, Lancashire in a leaky condition.
Leopard	United Kingdom	The steamship ran aground on the Krautsand, in the North Sea off the German coast. She was on a voyage from Hamburg, Germany to Hull, Yorkshire.
Lily	United Kingdom	The ship sank at Scarborough, Yorkshire. She was on a voyage from Porsgrund, Norway to Scarborough.
Lotta Bernard	United States	The paddle steamer foundered in Lake Superior with the loss of two of the fifteen people on board.
Opgaen de Sol	Norway	The ship was driven ashore at Horten.
Terlings	United Kingdom	The steamship was driven ashore at Sunderland, County Durham. She was on a voyage from Seaham, County Durham to Sunderland. She was refloated on 31 October.
Tilsit	Sweden	The steamship was driven ashore at "Snagbeck". She was on a voyage from Stockholm to Wolgast, Germany.
Trackfuglen	Norway	The ship was driven ashore at Horten.
Vavelet	Norway	The ship was driven ashore at Horten.
Young Mary	United Kingdom	The ship was driven ashore and wrecked at Speeton, Yorkshire. Her crew were rescued. She was on a voyage from Sunderland, County Durham to Wisbech, Cambridgeshire.
Unnamed	(Qing dynasty) Qing Navy	The gunboat foundered off the coast of Taiwan in a typhoon with the loss of all seventy crew.

== 30 October ==
List of shipwrecks: 30 October 1874
Ship	State	Description
Betsey	United Kingdom	The fishing smack sprang a leak and sank off Walton-on-the-Naze, Essex. Her crew survived.
Creole	France	The lugger foundered 2 nautical miles (3.7 km) north east of Trevose Head, Cornwall, United Kingdom. Her crew were rescued. She was on a voyage from Neath, Glamorgan, United Kingdom to Pontorson, Manche.
Eliza	United Kingdom	The schooner ran aground on the Cutler Sand, in the North Sea off the coast of Essex. She was on a voyage from Rouen, Seine-Inférieure, France to Newcastle upon Tyne, Northumberland. She was refloated and assisted in to Harwich, Essex in a severely leaky condition.
John Sauber	Germany	The steamship ran aground at Sunderland, County Durham, United Kingdom. She was on a voyage from Sunderland to Hamburg. She was refloated and resumed her voyage.
Karen	Denmark	The brigantine was driven ashore at Hurst Castle, Hampshire, United Kingdom. She was on a voyage from Hamburg, Germany to Lagos. She was refloated with the assistance of the tug Fiery Dragon (United Kingdom) and towed in to Cowes, Isle of Wight, United Kingdom.
Kelpie	United Kingdom	The brigantine ran aground at Great Yarmouth, Norfolk. She was on a voyage from South Shields, County Durham to London. She was refloated with the assistance of a tug and taken in to Great Yarmouth in a severely leaky condition.
Königsunde	Netherlands	The ship was discovered derelict in the North Sea. She was taken in to "Blaavand Oxby Strand".
Marie Stuart	United Kingdom	The steamship ran aground on the South Carr Rock, off the coast of Fife. She was refloated.
Mary Fenwick	United Kingdom	The schooner was driven ashore and wrecked on "Wrangelsholm", in the Baltic Sea. Her crew were rescued. She was on a voyage from Kotka, Russia to London.
Mersey	United Kingdom	The ship ran aground at Wicklow.
Quicksilver	United Kingdom	The schooner sprang a leak and was abandoned 3 nautical miles (5.6 km) off the Mumbles, Glamorgan. Her crew were rescued by at tug, which towed Quicksilver in to the Mumbles.
Sophia and Isabella	United Kingdom	The ship was wrecked at Clacton-on-Sea, Essex.
Sparrowhawk	United Kingdom	The smack foundered in the North Sea. Her crew were rescued.

== 31 October ==
List of shipwrecks: 31 October 1874
Ship	State	Description
Adolphe	Germany	The ship was wrecked at Wissant, Pas-de-Calais, France. She was on a voyage from Hamburg to Valparaíso, Chile.
Alfredo	Spain	The barque collided with the steamship Alicante (Spain) and sank off Sagua la Grande, Cuba with the loss of a crew member.
Kong Oscar	Flag unknown	The ship ran aground in the New Inlet. She was on a voyage from Swansea, Glamorgan, United Kingdom to New York, United States. She was refloated and found to be leaky.
Live Oak	United Kingdom	The barque was driven ashore at "Zervi", Greece. She was refloated and taken in to Syros, Greece.
Naiad	United Kingdom	The schooner collided with the steamship Robin Hood (United Kingdom) in the Bristol Channel. Naiad was on a voyage from Runcorn, Cheshire to Newport, Monmouthshire. She was towed in to the Mumbles, Glamorgan by Robin Hood, sinking at the bows.
Seagull	United Kingdom	The steamship ran aground at Rotterdam, South Holland, Netherlands. She was refloated on 2 November.
Ville des Couets	France	The chasse-marée was driven ashore at Dungeness, Kent, United Kingdom. Her three crew were rescued by the Dungeness Lifeboat David Howlett ( Royal National Lifeboat Institution). She was on a voyage from Newcastle upon Tyne, Northumberland, United Kingdom to Seville, Spain. She was refloated with assistance from the tug Victory (United Kingdom) and taken in to Dover, Kent.
Violet	United Kingdom	The steamship ran aground at the entrance to Telegouia Bay. She was on a voyage from Bergen, Norway to Nicholaieff, Russia.

== Unknown date ==
List of shipwrecks: Unknown date in October 1874
Ship	State	Description
Acapulco	United States	The steamship ran aground at Panama City, United States of Colombia. She was on a voyage from New York to Panama City.
Achates	United Kingdom	The ship was driven ashore at Jonesport, Maine, United States. She was on a voyage from Pictou, Nova Scotia, Canada to Pembroke. She was a total loss.
Adler	Germany	The steamship was lost off the coast of "Kinshui".
Admiral Fitzroy	United Kingdom	The ship caught fire in the Atlantic Ocean and was abandoned before 14 October. Her crew were rescued.
Alexander Hall	United Kingdom	The ship ran aground in the Saint Lawrence River at Rivière-du-Loup, Quebec, Canada. She was on a voyage from Dundee, Forfarshire to Quebec City. She was refloated in late October.
Anglia	United Kingdom	The steamship was driven ashore on the coast of Northumberland. Thirteen passengers were taken off by the Hauxley Lifeboat.
Annette	Germany	The koff collided with a steamship and was abandoned in the North Sea. Her crew were rescued. She was on a voyage from Memel to Brake.
Assineboine	United Kingdom	The ship was wrecked on Langlade Island. She was on a voyage from Miramichi, New Brunswick, Canada to Glasgow, Renfrewshire.
Augustin	France	The ship was driven ashore 10 nautical miles (19 km) from Dénia, Spain. Her crew were rescued. She was on a voyage from Marseille, Bouches-du-Rhône to Guadeloupe.
Balder	United Kingdom	The ship capsized in the North Sea before 28 October.
Brodrene	Norway	The brig capsized. Her crew were rescued. She was towed in to Kristiansund.
Camano	United Kingdom	The ship arrived at Odesa, Russia from Liverpool, Lancashire on fire. The fire was extinguished.
Cambria	New Zealand	The 43-ton schooner left Port Chalmers on 9 October for Timaru. She and her five crew were not seen again. It is likely that she foundered in a storm which hit on 12–13 October.
China	United Kingdom	The steamship was damaged by fire at Hong Kong, China.
Congo	United Kingdom	The steamship ran aground in the Cameroon River. She was refloated eight days later.
County of Perth	United Kingdom	The ship was destroyed by fire at sea. Twenty-one of her 30 crew were rescued, nine were reported missing. She was on a voyage from the Clyde to Calcutta, India.
Die Sonne	Germany	The schooner was driven ashore near Fraserburgh, Aberdeenshire, United Kingdom. She was on a voyage from Dundee, Forfarshire to Fraserburgh. She was later refloated and taken in to Fraserburgh.
Emilia	France	The ship was driven ashore at "Isador". She was on a voyage from Buenos Aires, Argentina to Marseille.
Ennerdale	United Kingdom	The steamship ran aground in the Red Sea. She was on a voyage from Liverpool to Bombay, India. She was refloated and resumed her voyage, arriving at Bombay on 4 November.
Etna	Canada	The ship was abandoned in the Atlantic Ocean before 7 October. She was on a voyage from Saint John, New Brunswick to Matanzas, Cuba.
Flibberty	United Kingdom	The ship was wrecked at Port Dauphiné, Madagascar.
Galgo	United Kingdom	The steamship was wrecked on the coast of Brazil.
Generoso C.	Italy	The barque ran aground on the English Bank, in the River Plate and was abandoned by her crew. She was on a voyage from Cardiff, Glamorgan, United Kingdom to Montevideo, Uruguay.
George Peabody	United States	The ship ran aground in the Mississippi River. She was on a voyage from Charleston, South Carolina to the Southwest Pass.
Germania	Germany	The ship was driven ashore near Burgsvik, Gotland, Sweden. She was on a voyage from Riga, Russia to Stockholm, Sweden. She was refloated and resumed her voyage.
Giovanno R.	Austria-Hungary	The barque foundered in the Mediterranean Sea off Saint-Laurent-de-la-Salanque, Pyrénées-Orientales, France. She was on a voyage from Trieste to Cette, Hérault, France.
Gomez II	Portugal	The ship was driven ashore. She was on a voyage from Bangor, Maine, United States to Saint Vincent. She was refloated and taken in to New Bedford, Massachusetts, United States in a leaky condition.
Grand Master	United Kingdom	The ship was wrecked in the Java Sea. Her crew were rescued. She was on a voyage from "Zebu", Spanish East Indies to Liverpool.
Grandville	France	The ship struck the wreck of Kertschel (Flag unknown) at Maldonado, Uruguay and was wrecked. Her crew were rescued. She was on a voyage from Bordeaux, Gironde to Maldonado.
Griffon	France	The schooner was driven ashore and sank at "Habblingbo".
Hannah	United Kingdom	The brig was driven ashore at Cape Espichel, Portugal. Her crew were rescued.
Hermann	Germany	The sbrig capsized in the North Sea before 27 October. Her crew were rescued. She was on a voyage from Riga to an English port. She was subsequently discovered by the steamship Stettin (Flag unknown) and towed in to Leith, Lothian, United Kingdom.
Janetta	Austria-Hungary	The barque was abandoned in the Atlantic Ocean a sinking condition. Her crew were rescued by Jenny Queirolo (Flag unknown).
Johannes Bray	Flag unknown	The ship was abandoned in the North Sea. Her crew were rescued. She was towed in to Whitby, Yorkshire.
Julia	United Kingdom	The ship was driven ashore. She was on a voyage from Onega, Russia to Liverpool. She was refloated and take in to "Wardsoe" in a leaky condition.
Kiasiena	Denmark	The ship was abandoned in a sinking condition. Her crew were rescued. She was on a voyage from Liverpool to the Faroe Islands.
Kosmopoliet II	Russia	The ship capsized at Rotterdam, South Holland, Netherlands.
Langan	United Kingdom	The ship was wrecked on Anticosti Island, Nova Scotia, Canada. She was on a voyage from Liverpool to Quebec City.
Lucerne	United Kingdom	The ship struck the Ariadne Rocks, in Chinese waters and was beached.
Mary Ann	United Kingdom	The schooner ran aground on the Goodwin Sands, Kent. She was refloated with assistance from the Walmer Lifeboat and taken in to Ramsgate, Kent.
Max Emil	Germany	The schooner was driven ashore in "Roinaldsfjord". She was on a voyage from Gävle, Sweden to Newcastle upon Tyne, Northumberland, United Kingdom. She was refloated and found to be leaky.
Meike Cornelia	Netherlands	The ship was towed in to Fredrikshavn, Denmark in a waterlogged condition.
Mermaid	Barbados	The ship was abandoned at sea. Her crew were rescued. Also reported ashore at "Vauchin", Martinique.
Mogul	United Kingdom	The ship was destroyed by fire at sea. Her crew survived. She was on a voyage from Liverpool to San Francisco, California, United States.
Moreno	France	The steamship ran aground at Rio de Janeiro, Brazil. She was on a voyage from Rio de Janeiro to Havre de Grâce, Seine-Inférieure. She was declared a total loss. She capsized and sank on 21 October.
Moss Trooper	United Kingdom	The ship caught fire in the Atlantic Ocean and was abandoned before 14 October. Her crew were rescued.
Nancy	United Kingdom	The ship was driven ashore on East Bimini, Bahamas before 19 October. She was on a voyage from Campeche, Mexico to a European port. She was refloated and resumed her voyage.
New England	United States	The ship was wrecked on the coast of Labrador, Newfoundland Colony before 8 October.
Niger	France	The steamship ran aground in the Gironde and was damaged. She was on a voyage from Brazil to Bordeaux, Gironde. She was refloated.
Orconera	Flag unknown	The steamship was driven ashore at "Grezhano". She was refloated on 11 October and taken in to "Grezhano" .
Penelope	Sweden	The ship was abandoned in a sinking condition. Her crew were rescued by Charlotte (United Kingdom). She was on a voyage from Pori, Grand Duchy of Finland to Cartagena, Spain.
Rambler	Canada	The barque was driven ashore at Richmond, Maine, United States. She was on a voyage from Pictou, Nova Scotia to Boston, Massachusetts, United States.
Rose de Mai	France	The schooner sprang a leak and foundered off Arcachon, Gironde. Her crew were rescued.
Rjukan	Denmark	The ship was wrecked on Dead Island. She was on a voyage from Hull, Yorkshire, United Kingdom to Quebec City.
Scawfell	United Kingdom	The barque ran aground off Bohol, Spanish East Indies. She was on a voyage from Manila to "Zebu", Spanish East Indies. She was refloated and towed in to Zebu in a leaky condition.
Sif	Norway	The ship was driven ashore at "Alandskaf". She was on a voyage from Härnösand, Sweden to London, United Kingdom. She was refloated and taken in to Öregrund, Sweden in a severely leaky condition.
Stephensons	United Kingdom	The steamship ran aground at Yeni-Kale, Russia. She was refloated.
Susannah Johanna	United Kingdom	The ship was destroyed by fire in the Atlantic Ocean. Her crew were rescued. She was on a voyage from South Shields, County Durham to Acheen, Netherlands East Indies.
Tegner	United States	The ship was wrecked at "Doboy". She was on a voyage from "Doboy" to Savannah, Georgia.
Thora	Denmark	The brig was wrecked in the Los Roques archipelago, Venezuela. Her crew were rescued.
Tif	Norway	The ship was driven ashore in the Sea of Åland. She was on a voyage from Härnösand, Sweden to London. She was refloated and taken in to Öregrund, Sweden in a severely leaky condition.
Undine	United Kingdom	The ship was driven ashore in Caffa Bay. She was refloated.
Vesta	Norway	The brig collided with the barque Riga (Netherlands) and was abandoned at sea. Vesta was on a voyage from Aberdeen, United Kingdom to Tvedestrand.
Ville de Marseille	France	The steamship was lost off "Cape Torenana". Her crew were rescued.
Voloscano	France	The ship was abandoned by her crew. She was on a voyage from Bordeaux to Cardiff. She was subsequently taken in to Le Verdon-sur-Mer, Gironde.
Walker Hall	United Kingdom	The barque ran aground at Constantinople, Ottoman Empire. She was on a voyage from the Sea of Azov to an English port. She was refloated with the assistance of a tug and taken in to Constantinople.
Wave Queen	South Australia	The barque was wrecked in Rivoli Bay.
Waverley	United Kingdom	The steamship ran aground near Helsingør, Denmark She was on a voyage from Riga to Leith.. She was refloated and taken in to Helsingør.
Witch of the Seas	United Kingdom	The ship foundered. Her crew were rescued. She was on a voyage from London to Port Alfred, Cape Colony.
