= Lyonesse =

Mythical sunken land, part of England

- Tristan and Iseult location
- Genre: Arthurian legend

In-universe information
- Type: Fictional country
- Character: Tristan

Lyonesse (pronounced /liːɒˈnɛs/ lee-uh-NESS) is a kingdom which, according to legend, consisted of a long strand of land stretching from Land's End at the southwestern tip of Cornwall, England, to what is now the Isles of Scilly in the Celtic Sea portion of the Atlantic Ocean. It was considered lost after being swallowed by the ocean in a single night. The people of Lyonesse were said to live in fair towns, with over 140 churches, and work in fertile, low-lying plains. Lyonesse's most significant attraction was a castle-like cathedral. It is sometimes spelled Lionesse.

Lyonesse is mentioned in Arthurian legend, specifically in the tragic love-and-loss story of Tristan and Iseult. It was the home of the hero Tristan (one of the Knights of the Round Table), whose father Meliodas was king of Lyonesse. After the death of Meliodas, Tristan became the heir of Lyonesse, but he was never to take up his inheritance because the land sank beneath the sea while he was away at his uncle King Mark's court in Cornwall. In later traditions, Lyonesse is said to have sunk beneath the waves in a single night, but stories differ as to whether this catastrophic event occurred on 11 November 1099, or 10 years earlier. According to one legend, the people of Lyonesse had committed a crime so terrible that God took his revenge against them and their kingdom. The exact nature of the crime is never specified, but the legend tells of a horrific storm that occurred over the course of a single night, resulting in an enormous wave that swallowed the kingdom.

== The sole survivor ==
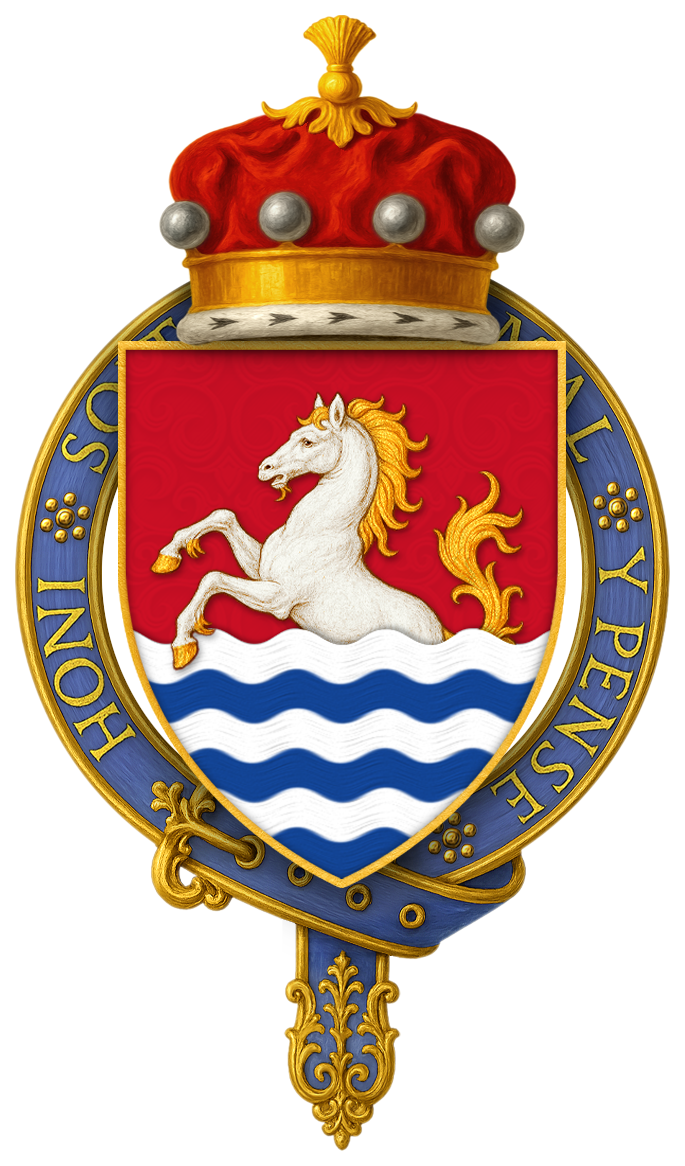
Trevelyan arms depicting the white horse

Local Cornwall village tourism guides offer stories of a man who escaped the storm and a subsequent wave while riding a white horse. Apparently, the horse lost one of its shoes during the escape. The rider's name is thought to be Trevelyan (or Trevilian). The rider had been out hunting during the day and had fallen asleep under a tree. Trevelyan was awoken by a horrible noise and raced across the land to higher ground. This story is linked to local Cornish families who have used the image of three horseshoes as part of their armorial bearings for generations. One family in particular goes by the name Vyvyan, and is one of Cornwall's oldest families; they also have a crest of a white horse and claim to be descendants of the sole survivor, Trevelyan. The Vyvyan family claims that Trevelyan was the last governor of the lost kingdom before Lyonesse was swallowed by the ocean.

Today, many myths and legends continue to arise about Lyonesse without physical evidence. Included among these legends are tales of local fishermen who claim that on calm days, one can still hear the bells of the many churches softly ringing in the seas off the west Cornish coast. Local fishermen also claim that they have caught glass, forks, and wood in their fishing nets.

== The Lyonesse Project ==
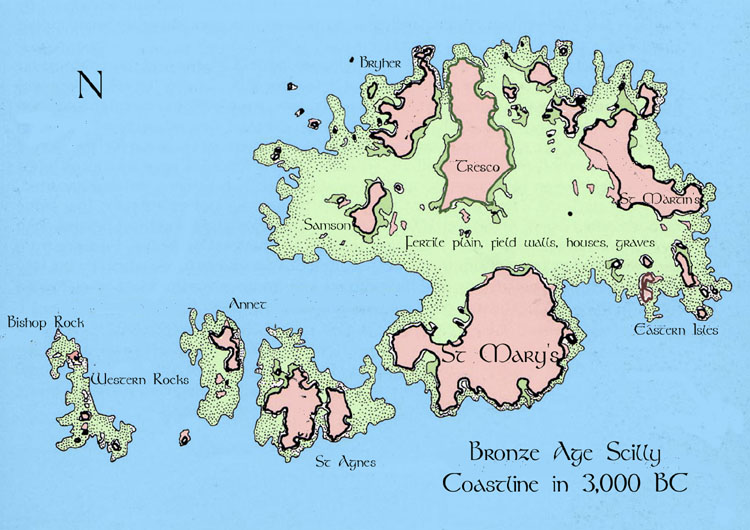
Isles of Scilly in 3 000 BCE: With the lower sea level, most of the archipelago formed one large island with a central plain.

A 2009–2013 joint study titled The Lyonesse Project: A Study of the Coastal and Marine Environment of the Isles of Scilly was commissioned by English Heritage and carried out by the Historic Environment Projects, Cornwall Council, with a team of academics, local experts, and enthusiasts "to reconstruct the evolution of the physical environment of the Isles of Scilly during the Holocene, the progressive occupation of this changing coastal landscape by early peoples, and their response to marine inundation and changing marine resource availability".

The project found that much of the story of Lyonesse can be "dismissed as fantasy"; legends and memories of submergences are common throughout coastal northwestern Europe. However, the study did conclude that the Isles of Scilly were once a single large island, separated into smaller islands by the rapid rise of the sea. Stone walls have been found under the water in the vicinity of the Isles of Scilly, which support the findings that sea level rises affected the towns of the area, although whether they are evidence of buildings or the remains of medieval fish traps remains unclear.

== Lyonesse in Arthurian legend ==
In medieval Arthurian legend, no references are made to the sinking of Lyonesse, because the name originally referred to a still-existing place. Lyonesse is an English alteration of French Léoneis or Léonois (earlier Loönois). The French Prose Tristan appears to place Léonois beside Cornwall.

In English adaptations of the French tales, Léonois, now "Lyonesse", becomes a kingdom closely associated with the Cornish region, though its exact geographical location remained unspecified. The name for the legendary lost land between Land's End and Scilly was based on the old Cornish name: Lethowsow. This derives from the Cornish name for the Seven Stones Reef, on the reputed site of the lost land's capital and the site of the notorious wreck of the Torrey Canyon. The name means 'the milky ones', from the constant white water surrounding the reef.

Alfred, Lord Tennyson's Arthurian epic Idylls of the King describes Lyonesse as the site of the final battle between King Arthur and Mordred (King Arthur's nephew and illegitimate son). One passage in particular references legends of Lyonesse and its rise from (and subsequent return to) the ocean:

Then rose the King and moved his host by night
And ever pushed Sir Mordred, league by league,
Back to the sunset bound of Lyonesse—
A land of old upheaven from the abyss
By fire, to sink into the abyss again;
Where fragments of forgotten peoples dwelt,
And the long mountains ended in a coast
Of ever-shifting sand, and far away
The phantom circle of a moaning sea.

== Analogues in Celtic mythology ==
The legend of a sunken kingdom appears in Cornish, Breton and Welsh mythologies. In Christian times, it came to be viewed as a sort of Cornish Sodom and Gomorrah, an example of divine wrath provoked by unvirtuous living. A Breton parallel is found in the tale of the Cité d'Ys or Ker Ys, similarly drowned as a result of its debauchery, with a single virtuous survivor, King Gradlon, escaping on a horse. According to Welsh legend, the kingdom of Cantre'r Gwaelod in Cardigan Bay was drowned due to the drunkard negligence of its prince, Seithenyn, who allowed the sea to sweep through the floodgates.

The tale of Lyonesse is sometimes suggested to represent an extraordinary survival of folk memory of the flooding of the Isles of Scilly and Mount's Bay near Penzance when the sea levels rose during the Bronze Age. For example, the Cornish name of St Michael's Mount is Karrek Loos y'n Koos – literally "the grey rock in the wood", suggesting that the bay was once a forest. According to local tourism guides in the region, Lyonesse was once connected to the west of Cornwall and is firmly rooted in Cornwall's traditions and mythology. Cornish people around Penzance still get occasional glimpses at extreme low water of a sunken forest in Mount's Bay, where petrified tree stumps become visible adjacent to the Celtic Sea. John of Worcester, a famous English monk and chronicler, wrote in 1099 that St Michael's Mount (now an island in Mount's Bay) was five or six miles from the sea, enclosed in a thick wood. The importance of the maintenance of this memory can be seen in that it came to be associated with the legendary Brython hero Arthur, although the date of its inundation is actually c. 2500 BC.

== Cultural references ==
=== In poetry ===
- Tristram of Lyonesse (1882) is an epic poem by Algernon Charles Swinburne.
- When I Set out for Lyonnesse (1914) is by Thomas Hardy. An edition published in 1932 adds the year 1870 to the title, a reference to Hardy's trip to St Juliot, where he met his first wife Emma Gifford. The poem said Lyonnesse is "a hundred miles away"; the straight-line distance from St Juliot to Dorchester is 97 miles.
- Sunk Lyonesse (1922), by Walter de la Mare
- The Lost Land (1926) is a poem about Lyonesse that Arthur Gilchrist Brodeur and Farnham Bishop wrote and included in their Arthurian novel, The Altar of the Legion. The Lost Land was later quoted in a letter (dated May 26th, 1936) from C. L. Moore to H. P. Lovecraft.
- Lyonnesse (1962), by Sylvia Plath
- Lyonnesse (2021), by Penelope Shuttle

=== In literature ===
- Dawn in Lyonesse is a 1938 short novel by Mary Ellen Chase.
- Edith Oliver writes about a vision of Lyonesse in her 1938 autobiography, Without Knowing Mr Walkley.
- The Lyonesse Trilogy is a group of three novels by Jack Vance.
- Lyonesse: The Well Between the Worlds (2009) and Lyonesse: Dark Solstice (2010) are two children's books by Sam Llewellyn.
- The 2012 manga series The Seven Deadly Sins is set in the kingdom of Liones, which is placed in the north of Britannia.

=== In film ===
- The 1965 film City Under the Sea (also known as War-Gods from the Deep) is set in the remnants of an undersea kingdom off Cornwall, which one character presumes to be Lyonesse.
- In the 1995 film First Knight, Guinevere, before her marriage to King Arthur, rules as 'Lady of Lyonesse'.

=== In music ===
- "Lyonesse", a song by Cornish folk composer Richard Gendall, appears as the title track of the 1982 album by Brenda Wootton.
- "When I Set out for Lyonnesse" is a setting of Hardy's poem by English composer Gerald Finzi in his 1936 song cycle Earth and Air and Rain
- "Lyonesse", a track on instrumental post-rock band 65daysofstatic's third album The Destruction of Small Ideas.
- "The Bells of Lyonesse", a song by German progressive metal band Subsignal, which appears on their 2018 album La Muerta.

=== In transport ===
- SS Lyonesse was a steam ferry of the West Cornwall Steam Ship Company.
- Lyonesse: Great Western Railway Bulldog class steam locomotive no. 3361
- Lyonnesse: Southern Railway King Arthur class steam locomotive no. 743
- Lyonnesse: British Railways standard class 5 steam locomotive no. 73113.

== See also ==
- Matter of Britain
- Kitezh
- Doggerland
