= Earl of Arran =

Earl of Arran may refer to:

- Earl of Arran (Scotland), a title in the Peerage of Scotland
- Earl of Arran (Ireland), a title in the Peerage of Ireland
- PS Earl of Arran (1860), a steamship 1860–1871

== See also ==
- Earl of Arran and Cambridge
- Earl of Arran's Regiment of Cuirassiers
