= SS Lady of the Isles =

History
- Name: 1875–1940: S.S. Lady of the Isles
- Operator: 1875–1905: West Cornwall Steam Ship Company; 1905–1929: Western Marine Salvage Company, Penzance; 1929–1938: Captain Harry Simpson, Penzance; 1938–1940: Royal Navy
- Port of registry: (United Kingdom)
- Builder: Harvey and Company, Hayle
- Launched: 15 March 1875
- Fate: Mined 3 October 1940

General characteristics
- Tonnage: 162 gross register tons (GRT)
- Length: 130.5 ft (39.8 m)
- Beam: 18.5 ft (5.6 m)
- Draught: 10.5 ft (3.2 m)
- Installed power: 180 hp
- Propulsion: Compound engines of 45 hp nominal with a surface condenser
- Speed: 12 mph
- Capacity: 90 passengers

SS Lady of the Isles was a passenger vessel built by Harvey and Company, Hayle for the West Cornwall Steam Ship Company in 1875.

== History ==
The Lady of the Isles was launched by Miss Denbigh, daughter of the secretary of the shipbuilder Harvey's of Hayle on 15 March 1875. She was 135 feet (41 m) long and 162 gross register tons (GRT). She had a fore cabin accommodating thirty passengers, and a saloon for sixty. She was fitted with a donkey engine to work a steam-winch, which in turn could be applied to a windlass.

On 1 September 1904, she struck the Heaver Rock (50.059076°N 5.555695°W). She was beached in Lamorna Cove to stop her from sinking. She was re-floated and repaired and with new boilers.

On 28 May 1905 she had been fitted with additional spars for receiving wireless telegraph messages. She departed from Penzance, but the spar on the foremast collapsed, damaging the lifeboat. After pausing in Sennen Cove, she continued to Scilly.

At the end of 1905 she was sold to Western Marine Salvage Co of Penzance. In 1929 she was purchased by Captain Harry Simpson of Penzance. From 1938 she was employed on salvage cable, and Air Force maintenance, and also continued running at times in conjunction with the Isles of Scilly Steamship Company.

While in the service of the Royal Navy, she struck a magnetic mine and sank off Killigerran Head near Falmouth on 3 October 1940 with the loss of sixteen crew. Three crew survived.
