= John Banfield (snr) =

Ship owner who launched the first steamship service from Penzance to the Isles of Scilly

John Banfield (1827-1887) was a ship owner who launched the first steamship service from Penzance to the Isles of Scilly.

== Life ==
He was born on the Isles of Scilly on 24 August 1827, the son of Francis Banfield (1792-1850) and Ann Mumford (1785-1864)

He was educated by Revd. Marsials in Lille, France and afterwards spent some time in Naples.

He married Ann Laity Andrew (1830-1890), daughter of Nicholas Andrew of Hill Street, Toxteth Park on 3 July 1849 at St John the Baptist’s Church, Toxteth Park, Liverpool and they had the following children:

- Francis Banfield (1852-1914)
- John Banfield (1854-1920)
- Harold Nicholas Andrew Banfield (1856-1858)
- Anne Laity Banfield (1860-1929)
- Ada Maud Mary Banfield (1862-1932)
- Elizabeth Frances Banfield (1865-1937)

He died on 3 November 1887 and was buried in the family vault at St Mary's Church, St Mary's Isles of Scilly. He left an estate valued at £1044 4s. 11.d. (equivalent to £118,700 in 2025).

== Career ==
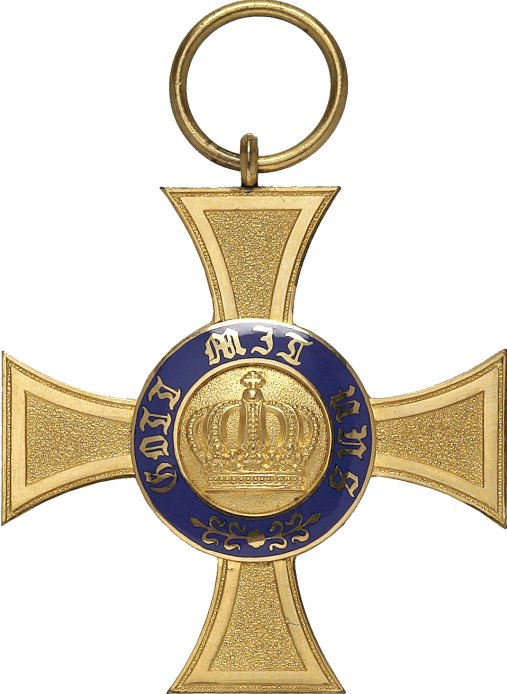
Order of the Crown 4th Class (Prussia)

He was articled to Millett and Borlase in Penzance as a solicitor and notary public, later spending time in London in the offices of Coode, Kingdon and Cotton. In 1849 he was appointed by the Lord Chamberlain as a Master Extraordinary in the High Court of Chancery.

He then returned to the Isles of Scilly to work as ship agent and ship-owner with his father, Francis Banfield. With his brother, Francis Banfield he was appointed agents to Lloyds. John Banfield was a Justice of the Peace for the County of Cornwall. In 1849 Baron Lionel Rothschild appointed him Consular Agent for the Austrian Empire at the Scilly Islands. He was also Vice-consul for the German empire, and Portugal, and consular-agent for Italy and Russia.

In 1875 as a result of his services during the wrecking of the SS Schiller, he was appointed commander of the Order of the Crown 4th Class (Prussia).

In 1858 he was one of the founders of the Scilly Isles Steam Navigation Company and on its failure he became one of the first Directors and principal shareholder of the West Cornwall Steam Ship Company. On the death of Edward Rodd, he became chairman of the company, a position he retained until his death.

In 1885 he started the Mount’s Bay Steamship Company and afterwards the Boskenna Bay and Carbis Bay Steam Ship Company.
