= West Cornwall Steam Ship Company =

English ferry company

- Industry: Passenger transportation Freight transportation
- Founded: 5 February 1870
- Defunct: 1918
- Headquarters: Penzance, Cornwall
- Area served: Isles of Scilly
- Products: Ferry, Freight Vessels
- Services: Ferry Service, Freight Service, Mail

The West Cornwall Steam Ship Company was established in 1870 to operate ferry services between Penzance, Cornwall, and the Isles of Scilly. It became the West Cornwall Steamship Company in 1907 and was wound up in 1917.

== History ==
An advertisement from The Cornish Telegraph 27 July 1870

The company was formed on 5 February 1870, principally by the shareholders in the West Cornwall Railway. The following year it took over the "Little Western" from the Scilly Isles Steam Navigation Company which had been operating on the route since 1858.

An advertisement in The Cornishman newspaper on 25 July 1878 gives the timetable for the Royal Mail Steamers Queen of the Bay and the Lady of the Isles. Depending on ″wind and other circumstances″ there were sailings from Penzance to Scilly on Tuesdays, Thursdays and Saturdays at 11:15 am and from Scilly to Penzance on Mondays, Wednesdays and Fridays at 09:30 am.

Fares were 7s (equivalent to £36.02 in 2025), for the saloon (10s 6d (equivalent to £54.03 in 2025) return) and fore-cabin 5s (equivalent to £25.73 in 2025) (7s 6d (equivalent to £38.59 in 2025) return).

The sailings for the 1878/79 winter service were Penzance for Scilly on Wednesdays and Saturdays at 11:15 am, and leaving Scilly on Mondays and Thursdays at 9:30 am. For the first time, each of the ferries sailed daily (bar Sunday) from either Hugh Town or Penzance in 1879. On Thursday 22 May 1879 the Lady of the Isles made record time for the journey from Hugh Town to Penzance with a time of 3 hours 12 minutes.

The accounts for the year ending June 1881 give the principal items of income at that time. They were: passenger receipts £1,415, fish £1,498, vegetables £263, merchandise £786, towing £106, mail £450 and stores £26. The total revenue was £4,631 (up from £4,232 the previous year) and expenditure was £3,700 (£4,149 the previous year).

On 5 June 1907 the company held a meeting to consider a proposal to wind up the company voluntarily. The Deerhound acquired at a cost of £10,000 had proved to be too expensive a boat for the service and had recently been sold to the Canadian Government for £12,000 (equivalent to £1,248,100 in 2025). The company was acquired by John Banfield, who set up the West Cornwall Steamship Company in 1907. He already operated two steam launches around the islands, Seagull and Siva, to which he added a 120-ton sailing ship, the Golden Light.

The Lyonesse went in for repairs late in 1917 however, her boiler was condemned and she never returned to service. The company continued to offer sailings with small mail steamers until at least March 1918 but was wound up shortly afterwards.

Steam services to the islands were hastily arranged by the Government chartering the Lapwing from a Clyde operator Lapwing was a passenger and cargo vessel built in 1903 by Scott & Sons, Bowling. The contract between the Admiralty and the owner of S.S. Lapwing was due to end after May 1919. The islanders decided to raise £5,000 to meet the expenses to enter into a contract with the vessel’s owners to extend the service for six months with options for nine or twelve if necessary. The islanders also appointed a deputation to interview the directors of the Great Western Railway to see if they might be induced to run a service as the estimated £42,000 costs (equivalent to £1,875,000 in 2025) of a new boat were beyond the means of the islands.

A new company was formed in 1920, the Isles of Scilly Steamship Company which introduced services operated by the Peninnis (ex-HMS Argus).

== Chairmen ==
- Edward Rodd (until 1880)
- John Banfield (snr) 1880-1887
- Thomas Bedford Bolitho 1887-1915

== Vessels ==
=== Little Western ===
The Little Western had been launched in 1858, and transferred from the Scilly Isles Steam Navigation Company to the West Cornwall company in 1871 for the sum of £2,640 (equivalent to £268,863 in 2025). Captain Tregarthen was captain of the Little Western from 1859-1870. He had introduced the first sloop, Ariadne, to service Hugh Town from Penzance in 1849. Tregarthen's Hotel stands on the site of his home and is a Hugh Town icon. Little Western was wrecked on the Wells Reef on 6 October 1872.

=== Earl of Arran ===
The Earl of Arran was a paddle steamer built by Blackwood & Gordon (Yard No. 37) in Paisley in 1860 for service at Ardrossan and the Isle of Arran in Scotland. She moved to Penzance in 1870 but was wrecked in July 1872 on Irishman's Ledge to the west of Nornour. She was 140 feet long and displaced 148 gross registered tons and her rusting boilers can still be seen at low tide on the west shore of Nornour.

=== Guide ===
Guide was a wooden-hulled paddle steamer leased following the loss of the West Cornwall's two ships in 1872. It was built in 1869 for the Dartmouth Steam Packet Company by John Henry Warren for Harvey & Co, Hayle. Length 97.7 feet; Beam 19.8 feet; Depth 9 feet. It has a single-cylinder engine by Harvey of Hayle.

It was kept in service by the West Cornwall Steam Ship Company until 1875.

It was sold to Jackson and Ford of London and Milford in 1877, then Joseph Lawson of South Shields in 1883. In 1888 it was resold to John & David Morris, Pelaw Main and was reconstructed and converted to screw by Abbot & Co of Gateshead and renamed Jubilant. On 27 Nov 1897 it sailed from Maldon for the Tyne and its fate is unknown.

=== Queen of the Bay ===
The paddle steamer Queen of the Bay was built 1867 by Henderson, Colbourn and Company at Renfrew for William Alcock of Morecambe as an excursion paddle steamer with a passenger capacity of 195. She saw service in Morecambe Bay, Lancashire and then transferred to William Allsup of Preston for use at Blackpool in 1872, before being purchased in 1873 and transferred to Penzance in 1875, after being re-boilered by Harvey's of Hayle. She was 131 feet 6 inches, 136 tons and had a single diagonal paddle.

On 7 June 1884, the Queen of the Bay had to return to Hugh Town with engine problems and transfer her passengers and mail to the Lady of the Isles. Later in 1884 and in 1885 she was engaged on a number of charters in the Bristol Channel during the summer season. Due to the growing trade between the mainland and the islands and the expection she would be replaced by a larger and more powerful vessel, she was sold to John Dutton, a merchant of Cardiff in 1885 for £2,250. She was then obtained by John T Hutchins, 1885 in Cardiff, Jessie Laurie, 1886 in Ilfracombe and the Newport & Bristol Channel Excursion Co Ltd. 1889 in Cardiff. She was damaged by fire on 22 May 1894 on the River Usk and sold for scrap.

=== Sir Walter Raleigh ===
In June 1884 the Plymouth tug took the place of the Queen of Bay as a temporary replacement.

=== Gael ===
The PS Gael was an Iron Paddle Steamer built by Robertson & Co. Engineer: Rankin & Blackmore in 1867 for the Campbeltown & Glasgow Steam Packet Joint Stock Company. She was the first ship built by this ship yard. She was 211 ft long, 23.2 ft beam, 10.6 ft deep and could achieve a speed of 16 knots. In 1884 she was sold to the Great Western Railway Company and based at Milford in Wales. She was chartered by the West Cornwall Steam Ship Company in 1887 and 1889 for the season. She returned to Scotland in 1891, based at Oban under the ownership of MacBrayne. There she served Gairloch via Mull, Eigg, Mallaig and Skye until she was broken up in 1924.

=== Lady of the Isles ===
The Lady of the Isles was launched by Harvey's of Hayle in 1875 and worked on the West Cornwall service until 1904. She was repaired and overhauled at Hayle in February 1881.

On 1 September 1904, she struck the Heaver Rock and was beached in Lamorna Cove to stop her from sinking; the passengers had to walk the 4 miles (6.4 km) back to Penzance!. She was re-floated and repaired with new boilers.

From 1905 she was a cable ship for the Royal Navy, and then from 1938 as the salvage vessel for the Western Marine Salvage Co of Penzance, until requisitioned by the Admiralty as an Auxiliary vessel. She was sunk by a mine off Killigerran Head near Falmouth on 3 October 1940. She was 130 feet 6 inches long and 162 tons.

=== Stormcock ===
The Liverpool registered twin-screwed steamer was hired in 1886 as a second boat for the potato and fish season. The 350 ton steamer was described as one of the largest and most powerful tugs, and was capable of 12.5 knots.

=== Lyonesse ===
The Lyonesse was another vessel built by Harvey's of Hayle, this time in 1889 and making her first crossing from Penzance to St Mary's on 17 April 1889. She had a 3-cylinder turbine engine and was 329 gross registered tons, 170 ft long, 25 ft 1in beam, 10 ft 4in depth. Lyonesse was sold in 1918 to Queenstown, as a salvage ship, and returned to Hayle in 1928 to be scrapped by Messrs Ward & Co.

Lyonesse is a legendary area of land reputedly lying beneath the sea between Cornwall and the Isles of Scilly.

=== Melmore ===
From 1904 to 1905 the screw steamer Melmore was in use for a short time.

=== Deerhound ===
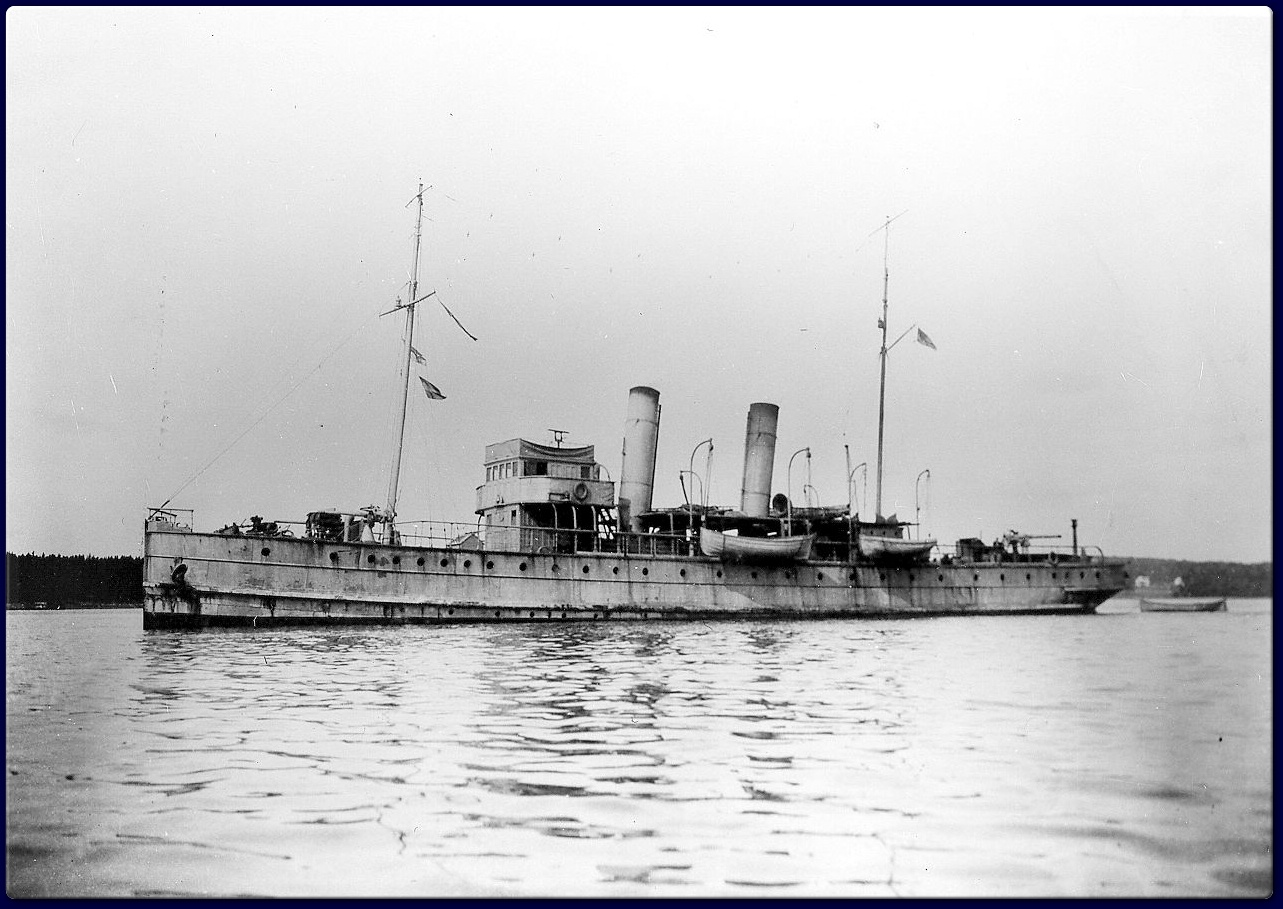
Deerhound as HMCS Lady Evelyn

The Deerhound had worked on the Mersey since being built in 1901, when she was transferred to West Cornwall in 1905. She was sold on to Canada two years later, becoming HMCS Lady Evelyn. She was 189 feet (58 m) long and 483 tons.

Period of operation
Date	1871–1872	1872–1875	1875–1889	1889–1905	1905–1907	1907-1918
Little Western	—					
Earl of Arran	—					
Guide		—				
Queen of the Bay			—			
Lady of the Isles			—	—		
Lyonesse				—	—	—
Deerhound					-	

== See also ==
- Scilly Isles Steam Navigation Company
- Isles of Scilly Steamship Company
