= John Banfield (jun) =

Mayor of Penzance in 1904

John Banfield OCI (1854–1920) was Mayor of Penzance in 1904.

== Life ==
Alverton Vean (now Alverton Manor)

He was born on the Isles of Scilly on 1 September 1854 the son of John Banfield (1827-1877) and Ann Laity Andrew (1830-1890).

He married Mary Evelyn Harvey (1864-1927), daughter of Dr. Harvey of St Just, on 25 June 1889 in Penzance and they had the following children:

- Laura Franes Banfield (1891-1891)
- Ethel Mary Banfield (1893-1974)
- Annie Doris Banfield (1895-1965)
- Loise Banfield

He died on 18 July 1920 at his house Alverton Vean in Penzance and was buried in the Borough Cemetery in Penzance. He left an estate valued at £26,509 13s. 2.d. (equivalent to £1,024,400 in 2025).

== Career ==
He was consular agent for France, Italy and the United States and for many years managed the affairs of the West Cornwall Steam Ship Company.

He was elected in the West Ward of Penzance Town Council in 1895 and served as Mayor in 1904. He stood down from the council in 1911.

In 1919 Victor Emmanuel III King of Italy conferred upon him Kinght of the Order of the Crown of Italy
