= SS Lyonesse =

History
- Name: 1889–1928: S.S. Lyonesse
- Operator: 1889–1919: West Cornwall Steam Ship Company; 1919–1928
- Port of registry: (United Kingdom)
- Builder: Havey and Company, Hayle
- Yard number: 45
- Launched: 2 February 1889
- Out of service: 1928
- Fate: Scrapped 1928 by Thos. W. Ward, Hayle

General characteristics
- Tonnage: 329 gross register tons (GRT)
- Length: 170 ft (51.8 m)
- Beam: 25.1 ft (7.7 m)
- Draught: 10.4 ft (3.2 m)
- Propulsion: Triple-expansion steam engine

SS Lyonesse was a passenger vessel built for the West Cornwall Steam Ship Company in 1875.

== History ==
She was built by Harvey's of Hayle. She was fitted with a turtle back deck, long bridge, promenade quarterdeck, Walker's patent windlass, patent anchors, saloon, fore and aft cabins. The launch was carried out on 2 February 1889 by Mrs Field of Marazion. She was named Lyonesse as it is a country in Arthurian legend said to border Cornwall. In later traditions Lyonesse is said to have sunk beneath the waves some time after the Tristan stories take place, making it similar to Ys and other lost lands in medieval Celtic tales, and perhaps connecting it with the Isles of Scilly. She carried two funnels close together, with black tops.

On 22 June 1900 she hit the rocks at Newford Island whilst departing from St Mary's pier on the Isles of Scilly. She was badly bulged and leaking, but the passengers and mails were safe.

On 2 February 1904 she attempted to alert the inhabitants of St Mary's with her siren of a tidal wave which was engulfing the harbour. The Sheffield Daily Telegraph for 3 February 1904 reports:

About four a.m., about an hour before the tide was at its height, the inhabitants of St. Mary's were aroused by the loud hooting of the syren of the mail steamer Lyonesse. Men hurriedly rushed to discover the cause, and in doing so incurred considerable risk, as huge volumes of water were dashing over the quay, doing damage in every direction, and washing away everything not permanently secured. The steamer in a dangerous position held on to her moorings with the greatest difficulty. A number of small craft were washed out to sea, but were ultimately recovered. The damage done is increased by the fact that the flower season is now in progress. At Bryher, the neighbouring island, seas broke over the flower and potato fields, doing great damage. Happily, the wind was light, or much more serious results would have ensued. The Lyonesse subsequently passed over to Penzance, the passage being difficult on account of the heavy seas. The effects of the tidal wave were felt in Penzance, heavy seas dashing over the promenade, and deluging the streets and houses in the vicinity. Torrential rains were also experienced.

On 23 June 1914 she went to the assistance of the Belgian steamer Gothland which went ashore on the Isles of Scilly.

During bad weather on 27 March 1916, she broke from her moorings on the Isles of Scilly and ran on the beach. She was undamaged and was refloated.

She was sold in 1919 to a salvage ship at Cobh and returned to Hayle in May 1928 to be broken up.
