= Eleanor Duckett =

Philologist and medieval historian (1880–1976)

Eleanor Shipley Duckett
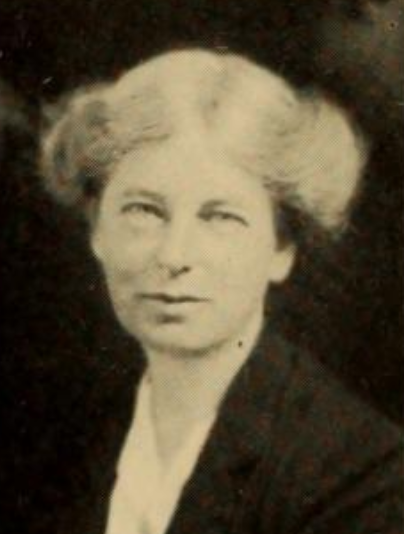
- Eleanor Duckett, from the 1929 yearbook of Smith College
- Born: 7 November 1880; Bridgwater, Somerset, England
- Died: 23 November 1976 (aged 96)
- Education: University of London (B.A., M.A.); Bryn Mawr College (Ph.D.)
- Occupations: Historian, philologist, writer, professor
- Known for: Gateway to the Middle Ages, The Wandering Saints of the Early Middle Ages
- Partner: Mary Ellen Chase

Eleanor Shipley Duckett (7 November 1880, Bridgwater, Somerset, England – 23 November 1976) was an English-born philologist and medieval historian who spent most of her career in the United States. For thirty years, she taught at Smith College (Northampton, Massachusetts). Duckett published a number of books with University of Michigan Press, mainly on European history, religious history, and saints, and was a reviewer for The New York Times Book Review. Initially, Duckett was known for writing accessible historical books on the Middle Ages; later, she acquired a reputation as an authority on early medieval saints. A devout Episcopalian, Duckett was the lifelong companion of novelist Mary Ellen Chase.

== Biography ==
Encouraged by her father to study the classical texts, Duckett worked through her preparatory education in order to attend university. She received her BA (1903) and MA (1904), as well as a degree in pedagogy (1905), from the University of London. She used these degrees to teach the classics at Sutton High School in Surrey until 1907, but then left to resume her own education with a scholarship to Girton College, the first women's college at Cambridge University. In 1911 she passed the Classical Tripos examination, and left Europe on another scholarship for PhD work at Bryn Mawr College, where she received her doctorate in 1914. In part, her move toward the United States was motivated by the lack of respect for women scholars in England. In 1964 she recalled how at Cambridge she showed the manuscript of her first book to "an eminent scholar," who asked her, "Do you want me to judge it on its own merits or as the work of a woman?"

In 1914, Duckett attained a position at Western College for Women in Ohio, and in 1916 began teaching Latin at Smith College, after 1928 as a full professor, where she would remain the rest of her career. In 1926, she met novelist Mary Ellen Chase, who was from Blue Hill, Maine. They lived together until Chase's death in 1973, and were honored by having adjoining halls named for them on the Smith College campus. In 1928 she was named the John M. Greene Professor of Classical Languages and Literature. She retired in 1949 and was named professor emeritus. In 1952, she finally received her doctorate from Girton College on the basis of her four published books on early medieval history. However, she never received a degree for her initial studies at Cambridge. Women were not awarded either full degrees or the benefits of membership at Cambridge until 1948.

After retirement in 1949, Duckett remained an active voice in the history of the Early Middle Ages, and retained a prominent position on campus as an emeritus professor. She kept her office in Neilson Library at Smith, and also spent extended periods researching and lecturing at Cambridge. She traveled the world to lecture, research, and receive honors for her work. Several of her most important publications were written after retirement. She was also very active in St. John's Episcopal Church in Northampton. She lectured there on the saints and the Church Councils, translated hymns, and organized readings of the Epistles.

Duckett continued to write and travel, mostly to Cambridge and Maine, where she and Chase stayed on the coast at a summer house called Windswept, a name which Chase was to use for one of her most popular novels. In 1973, after Chase died, Duckett lost the house in Northampton where she and Chase had lived since the 1920s and entered a nursing home. She died in 1976, and is buried next to Chase, near Windswept.

Eleanor Duckett's academic legacy is her body of work—seventeen full-length volumes, as well as many contributions to scholarly journals and two major encyclopedias. Another legacy stands on the grounds of Smith College. Duckett House is one of two residence buildings added to the campus in 1968. The second building, Chase House, adjoins Duckett, and as its companion honors the contributions of both women to the history of the institution.

== Publications and research interests ==
Duckett began her career as a Latin teacher and philologist, but in the 1920s moved steadily toward the Middle Ages. At this time also, her writing style began to change – possibly under the influence of Chase – toward a more active, accessible, and engaging style, "with considerable wit and sympathetic insight into character." In 1938, she published Gateway to the Middle Ages, which proved an accessible and popular book and established her reputation as a writer for a general audience. Finding more and more popular and scholarly recognition, she continued to cultivate her acquaintance with the scholarly authorities of her time, aided also by her position as a reviewer for The New York Times Book Review.

Duckett received a number of academic honors and awards. From 1926 to 1928 she held the Ottilie Hancock fellowship at Girton College. She accepted honorary degrees from the University of London (1920), Smith College (1949) and St. Dunstan's University (1969). The Pen & Brush Club, an organization devoted to the arts, celebrated her Anglo-Saxon Saints and Scholars as the most distinguished work of non-fiction of 1947. She also obtained an honorary membership in Phi Beta Kappa (1954), an honorary fellowship at Girton College (1958), and two Sophia Smith Fellowships for continuing research by Smith College emeriti (1963 and 1966). In 1964 she gave the Katharine Asher Engel Memorial Lecture at Smith, which was published the following year as Women and Their Letters in the Early Middle Ages.

== Select bibliography ==
- Hellenistic Influence on the Aeneid (Smith College, 1920)
- Latin Writers of the Fifth Century (Henry Holt, 1930)
- Gateway to the Middle Ages (Macmillan, 1938)
- The Book of Hugh and Nancy (Macmillan, 1938) with Eric Milner-White
- Anglo-Saxon Saints and Scholars (Macmillan, 1947)
- Alcuin, Friend of Charlemagne: His World and His Work (Macmillan, 1951)
- Saint Dunstan of Canterbury: A Study of Monastic Reform in the Tenth Century (UK: Collins, 1955; US: W. W. Norton, 1955)
- Alfred the Great and his England (UK: Collins, 1957; US: University of Chicago Press, 1956)
- The Wandering Saints (UK: Collins, 1959; US: W. W. Norton, 1959)
- Carolingian Portraits: A Study in the Ninth Century (University of Michigan Press, 1962)
- Women and Their Letters in the Early Middle Ages (Smith College, 1965) "Engel Lecture"
- Death and Life in the Tenth Century (University of Michigan Press, 1967)
- Medieval Portraits from East and West (London: Sidgwick & Jackson, 1972; US: University of Michigan Press, 1972)
