= Scilly Isles Steam Navigation Company =

Shipping services company

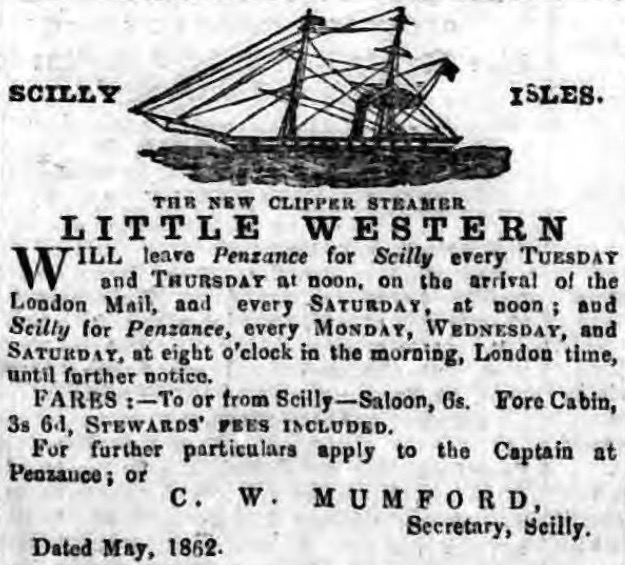
Advert from the Cornish Telegraph 9 July 1862

The Scilly Isles Steam Navigation Company provided shipping services between Cornwall and the Isles of Scilly from 1858 to 1872.

== Company ==
The company was founded in 1858 by John Banfield, Thomas Johns Buxton, William Mumford Hoskin and James Phillips, shareholders in the Little Western Steamship Association.

== Vessels ==
The company operated two vessels.

=== SS Scotia ===
The steamship SS Scotia on loan for a few months in 1858 and 1859.

=== SS Little Western ===
The Little Western was launched at Renfrew from the yard of James Henderson and Son on 4 November 1858. She made her maiden voyage from Penzance to Scilly on 6 December 1858. She was a steam schooner with a two cylinder iron screw. She displaced 115 ( 148 ) tons gross; 67 tons net and was 115ft 9ins in length; 18ft 5 ins in breadth and 9ft 4ins in depth. On the winding up of the company in 1871, the ship was transferred to the West Cornwall Steam Ship Company.

She was wrecked on Southward Wells Reef, off Samson on 6 October 1872 while attempting to give assistance to a disabled brigantine ship, Due Fratelli.

== See also ==
- West Cornwall Steam Ship Company
- Isles of Scilly Steamship Company
