= SS Little Western =

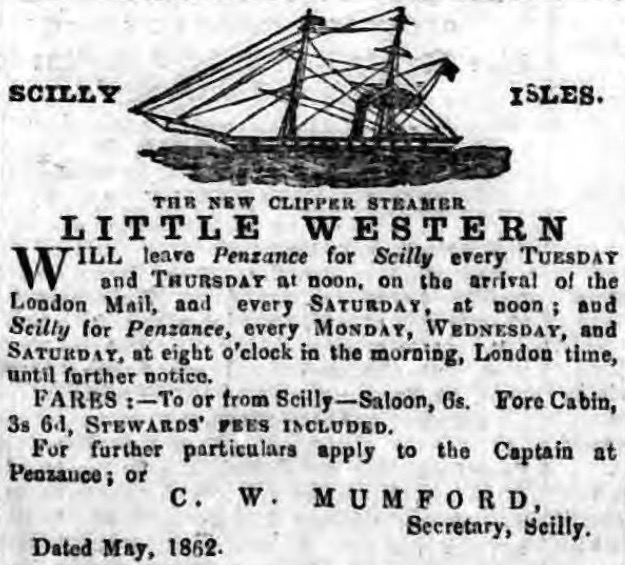

History
- Name: 1858–1872: S.S. Little Western
- Operator: 1858–1871: Scilly Isles Steam Navigation Company; 1871–1872: West Cornwall Steam Ship Company
- Port of registry: (United Kingdom)
- Route: 1860–1868: Ardrossan to Arran; 1871–1872: Penzance to Isles of Scilly
- Builder: James Henderson & Sons
- Yard number: 25
- Launched: 4 November 1858
- Out of service: 6 October 1872
- Fate: Wrecked on Southward Wells Reef

General characteristics
- Tonnage: 105 gross register tons (GRT)
- Length: 115 ft (35 m)
- Beam: 18 ft (5.5 m)

SS Little Western was a passenger vessel operated by the Scilly Isles Steam Navigation Company from 1858 to 1871 and the West Cornwall Steam Ship Company from 1871 to 1872.

== History ==
The Little Western was built by James Henderson and Son at Renfrew as a two cylinder iron screw steam schooner and launched on 4 November 1858.

She was operated from operated by the Scilly Isles Steam Navigation Company from 1858 to 1871. Captain Tregarthen was captain of the Little Western from 1859 to 1870. She transferred from the Scilly Isles Steam Navigation Company to the West Cornwall company in 1871 for the sum of £2,640 (equivalent to £257,000 in 2023).

Only a few weeks after the loss of the company's other ship, the Paddle Steamer Earl of Arran, she was wrecked on Southward Wells Reef, off Samson on 6 October 1872 while attempting to give assistance to a disabled brigantine ship, Due Fratelli.

Approximate position of Little Western's wreck
