= PS Queen of the Bay =

History
- Name: 1867–1894: P.S. Queen of the Bay
- Operator: 1867–1873: Blackpool Lytham and Southport Steam Packet Company; 1873–1885: West Cornwall Steam Ship Company; 1885–1889: Newport and Bristol Channel ExcursionCompany; 1889–????: John T Hutchins
- Port of registry: (United Kingdom)
- Route: 1867–1873: Morecambe Bay; 1873–1894: Penzance to Isles of Scilly
- Builder: Henderson, Coulborn and Company
- Yard number: 91
- Launched: 1867
- Out of service: 22 May 1894
- Fate: Damaged by fire whilst on the River Usk and sold for scrapping

General characteristics
- Tonnage: 138 gross register tons (GRT)
- Length: 131.5 ft (40.1 m)
- Beam: 18.1 ft (5.5 m)
- Capacity: 197 passengers

PS Queen of the Bay was a passenger vessel operated by the West Cornwall Steam Ship Company from 1873 to 1885.

== History ==
She was built by Henderson, Coulborn and Company in Renfrew and launched in 1867. She operated for the Blackpool, Lytham and Southport Steam Packet Company out of Morecambe for five years and then Blackpool for two years. She was sold to the West Cornwall Steam Ship Company in 1873 for £4,600 (equivalent to £514,838 in 2023).

In 1885 she was sold for £2,250 (equivalent to £306,982 in 2023) to the Bristol Channel and was operated by the Newport and Bristol Channel Excursion Company for four year. After a sale in 1889 to another Cardiff owner, she caught fire on the River Usk on 22 May 1894 and was sold for scrap.
