= Dawn in Lyonesse =

1938 novel by Mary Ellen Chase

- UK first edition
- Author: Mary Ellen Chase
- Cover artist: Albert E Barlow
- Language: English
- Publisher: Collins (UK); The Macmillan company (US)
- Publication date: 1938
- Publication place: United Kingdom
- Media type: Print
- Pages: 125 (UK edition)

Dawn in Lyonesse is a 1938 short novel by the American author Mary Ellen Chase, set in the English county of Cornwall. In an introductory note, the author explains that the quotations within the text are taken from various versions, both medieval and modern, of the Tristram romance.

US first edition

== Plot ==
Ellen Pascoe, a working class Cornish woman of 33, had endured a difficult childhood: first in her father's small cottage in a village near Land's End; then in St Ives where she had helped gut and clean the fish brought back by the fishing fleet, helped by her close childhood friend Susan Pengilly; and then, after her father's death, caring for her elderly grandmother in an isolated cottage on Bodmin Moor.

For years she had been intending to marry Derek Tregonny, one of the fishermen, a man severely affected by his wartime experiences 20 years earlier and who had become taciturn and sometimes surly. Their poverty had over the years always prevented them from naming a specific date for their wedding.

When Ellen secures a job as a live-in waitress at a hotel in Tintagel, and Derek unexpectedly finds a local market for his lobsters, the couple at last have sufficient funds, and they decide to marry later that year on Michaelmas Day.

One of the hotel's guests, an American academic, tells Ellen about Lyonesse and Tintagel's mythological past, and encourages her to read the romance of Tristram and Iseult. He investigates a local stone with a hole in it that is reputed to grant the wish of anybody who climbs through, and he offers to climb through on her behalf. She makes a secret wish. As Ellen's knowledge increases and her outlook expands, she feels herself to be awakening and capable of thoughts and ambitions previously unknown to her. She decides to stay in Tintagel, to get Derek a job in the local quarry, and to rent a small cottage nearby. She hopes to be able to enthuse Derek with her new-found outlook and ambitions, but is assailed by doubts and misgivings.

A postcard unexpectedly arrives for her at the hotel. Sent by Susan, it informs her that Derek has drowned. The manager allows Ellen a short period of leave, and she takes the next charabanc to Land’s End where the burial is to take place. On the way, the driver, who does not know of her connection with the dead man, informs her that Derek committed suicide.

After the burial, Ellen goes back with Susan to the house of Derek's mother, who bitterly blurts out that Derek ought to have married one of the two women, rather than being ‘open-handed’ and giving himself to both. Susan stays silent. Later that evening, Susan confesses her ‘wickedness’ in having persuaded Derek to be unfaithful to Ellen. She talks guiltily of the happy times they had had walking in the countryside, with Derek gradually opening up and becoming happier, as if emerging from a prison.

Susan fearfully tells Ellen of the ‘wicked wish’ she had made one day when they had visited the holed stone together, that Derek and Ellen should never marry: a wish that came true. But instead of angrily rejecting Susan, as she had expected, Ellen tells her that she is happy to hear that Derek did not remain shut up in himself, even for a short while. Ellen realises her hopes and visions for Derek had come alive, and she tells Susan that she too had made a wish on the stone that had come true. She invites Susan to join her in Tintagel.

== Critical reception ==
Writing in The Rotarian in 1939, the reviewer William Lyon Phelps considered the author to have created out of Tristan and Iseult and the situation of two ignorant waitresses and a laborer a structure of ineffable grace.

Kirkus Reviews considered the book to be an "effective piece of work, quiet, simple, poetic".

== Adaptation ==
In 1946 the novel was adapted by Thomas Job as a Broadway play entitled Land's End, with Shirley Booth as Susan and Helen Craig as Ellen. According to Booth's biographer, the play "came and went with embarrassing abruptness".
