= Windswept (Steuben, Maine) =

Historic house in Maine, United States

- U.S. National Register of Historic Places
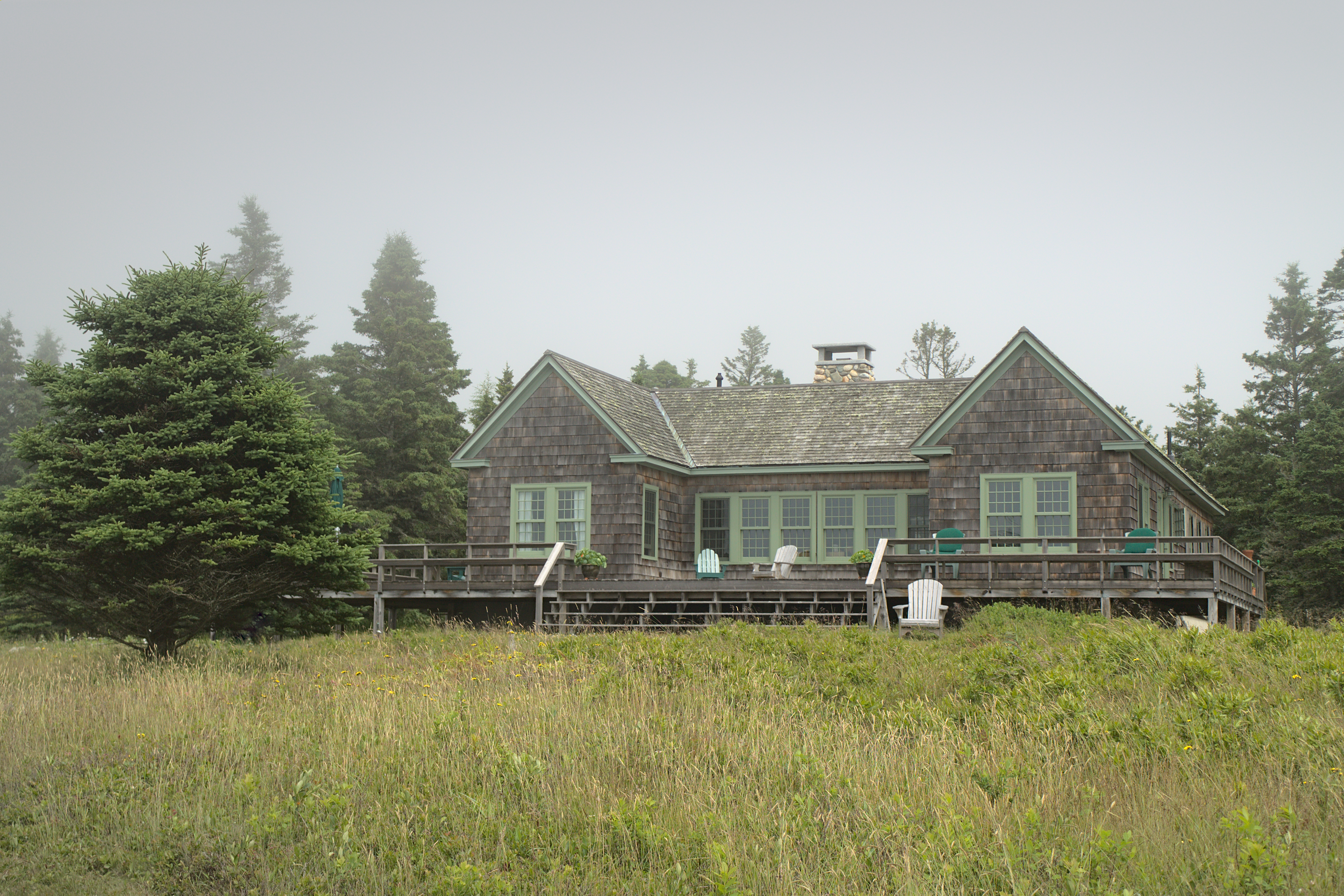
- Windswept from the ocean (west) side

- Location within Maine Location within the United States
- Location: 421 Petit Manan Point Rd., Steuben, Maine
- Coordinates: 44°25′5″N 67°54′45″W
- Area: 5 acres (2.0 ha)
- Built: 1936
- Architectural style: Colonial Revival
- NRHP reference No.: 07000411
- Added to NRHP: May 8, 2007

Windswept is a historic summer cottage at 421 Petit Manan Point Road in Steuben, Maine. Built sometime between 1928 and 1934, it was from 1941 until 1955 the summer home of Mary Ellen Chase (1887-1973), one of Maine's most important regional writers of the period. It was the inspiration for her bestselling work, Windswept. The property was listed on the National Register of Historic Places in 2007.

== Description and history ==
Windswept is located in southern Steuben, a coastal community of Down East Maine. It is on the west side of Petit Manan Point near its southern end, set on 5 acres (2.0 ha) at Yellow Birch Point. The main house is a single story wood-frame structure, consisting of two equal-sized gabled sections set parallel to each other and joined by a cross-gabled hyphen. The structure is oriented facing southwest, about 100 feet (30 m) from the shore, with views over grasses and low blueberry bushes to the Gulf of Maine and the Schoodic Peninsula. A low picket fence creates a courtyard between the wings east of the hyphen, and a wide deck extends across the western facade. The window shutters have pine tree cutouts, and the building exhibits restrained Colonial Revival symmetry. To the northeast of the house is a small barn with attached shed, both of uncertain date. The complex is sheltered to the east by a small copse of trees, through which its access drive passes.

Windswept was built sometime between 1928 and 1934 by G. Horton Glover of Florida, and was part of an ultimately unsuccessful effort to develop Petit Manan Point as a summer destination. Mary Ellen Chase, a Maine native who was then a professor at Smith College and already a well-known regional writer, rented the cottage in 1940, and purchased it the following year. In 1941 her novel Windswept was published, and was an immediate success. Chase's biographers claim that some of her best writing took place here in the following years.

== See also ==
- National Register of Historic Places listings in Washington County, Maine
