= PS Gael =

History
- Name: 1863–1924: PS Gael
- Operator: 1863–1884: Clyde and Campbeltown Steam Packet Joint Stock Company; 1884–1891: Great Western Railway; 1891–1924: David MacBrayne, Glasgow
- Port of registry: (United Kingdom)
- Route: 1867–1884: Campbelltown – Glasgow; 1884–1888: Weymouth – Cherbourg; 1888–1889: Penzance – Isles of Scilly; 1889–1891: General GWR duties; 1891–1914: Glasgow – Oban, Tobermory and Gairloch; 1914–1924: Clyde estuary
- Builder: Robertson and Company, Greenock
- Yard number: 1
- Launched: 9 March 1864
- Completed: 11 February 1867
- Out of service: 1924
- Fate: Scrapped 1924

General characteristics
- Tonnage: 403 gross register tons (GRT)
- Length: 211 ft (64 m)
- Beam: 23.2 ft (7.1 m)
- Draught: 11 ft (3.4 m)
- Installed power: 150 hp
- Propulsion: Rankin and Blackmore 2 Steam Oscillating Haystack Boilers.

PS Gael was a passenger vessel operated by the Great Western Railway from 1884 to 1891

== History ==
This paddle steamer was launched on 9 March 1864 and completed on 11 February 1867 She was named by Miss Minnie Galbraith, daughter of Andrew Galbraith Esq, Johnstone Castle, ex-Provost of Glasgow and spent most of her years in Scotland. She was owned by the Clyde and Campbeltown Steam Packet Joint Stock Company.

She was bought in 1884 and operated by the GWR, mainly on its Weymouth routes but also for a time at Milford Haven and from 1887 to 1889 at Penzance for the West Cornwall Steam Ship Company. In 1891 she returned to the Clyde for duties on routes from Glasgow to Oban, Tobermory and Gairloch.

She was scrapped in 1924.
