= PS Earl of Arran =

Coordinates: 49°57′20″N 6°15′37″W

History
- Name: 1860–1872: P.S. Earl of Arran
- Operator: 1860–1870: Ardrossan Steamboat Company; 1870–1872: West Cornwall Steam Ship Company
- Port of registry: (United Kingdom)
- Route: 1860–1868: Ardrossan to Arran; 1871–1872: Penzance to Isles of Scilly
- Builder: Blackwood and Gordon
- Yard number: 37
- Launched: 25 April 1860
- Out of service: 16 July 1872
- Fate: Wrecked on Nornour

General characteristics
- Tonnage: 148 gross register tons (GRT)
- Length: 140 ft (43 m)
- Beam: 18.5 ft (5.6 m)
- Draught: 8.5 ft (2.6 m)

PS Earl of Arran was a passenger vessel operated by the Ardrossan Steamboat Company from 1860 to 1871 and the West Cornwall Steam Ship Company from 1871 to 1872.

== History ==
She was built by Blackwood and Gordon and launched on 25 April 1860 for the Ardrossan Steamboat Company on the route between Ardrossan and Arran.

She was advertised for sale in 1868 and after being laid up for a while, in early 1870 she was sold to the West Cornwall Steam Ship Company, making a living from towing fishing vessels and also running pleasure cruises from Penzance along the coast. In 1871 she was put on duty providing shipping services between Penzance and the Isles of Scilly.

In 1871 she towed into Penzance an unidentified derelict ship believed to be American, which had four hundred casks of paraffin oil as cargo.

Early in 1872 she was involved with Little Western in recovering property from the wreck of the Delaware which had been wrecked on 20 December 1871 on Mincarlo in the Isles of Scilly.

She was badly damaged after hitting Irishman's Ledge on the east side of Nornour in the Isles of Scilly on 16 July 1872. She just managed to make it to Nornour Brow where she grounded and where her boilers still stand today. The engine-room filled within five minutes, and in ten minutes the saloon was flooded. The captain, using the boats, successfully transferred all 100 passengers and the mail onto Nornour Island. The passengers were returned to Penzance the next day on the Little Western.

The enquiry found that Captain Deason had followed the advice of Stephen Woodcock, who acted as pilot but was unlicensed to do so. The ship was said to have cost the company £3,000 and was insured for only £1,000. The wreck was not retrieved.

Approximate position of Earl of Arran's wreck
