= Mary Ellen Chase =

American educator, scholar, and author (1887–1973)

- Chase in 1933
- Born: February 24, 1887; Blue Hill, Maine
- Died: July 28, 1973 (aged 86); Northampton, Massachusetts
- Education: University of Maine; University of Minnesota
- Occupations: Professor, author
- Partner: Eleanor Duckett
- Writing career
- Notable works: Mary Peters, Silas Crockett, Windswept, The Edge of Darkness
- Notable awards: Constance Lindsay Skinner Award, 1956

Mary Ellen Chase (February 24, 1887 – July 28, 1973) was an American educator, scholar, and author. She is regarded as an important regional New England literary figure of the first half of the 20th century.

== Early life ==
Chase was born in Blue Hill, Maine; her father was an attorney and her mother a homemaker. Early inspiration to become a writer came from her grandmother's stories of her grandfather's decade as a ship's captain, as well as a meeting at age 13 with novelist Sarah Orne Jewett, who encouraged her.

== Career ==
After earning a bachelor's degree from the University of Maine in 1909, Chase taught for several years at boarding schools in Buck's Harbor, Maine, Chicago, and Montana. She then obtained a master's and Ph.D. in English from the University of Minnesota, where she was a member of Alpha Omicron Pi. In 1922 she became an assistant professor at the University of Minnesota. In 1926 she was hired as a professor of English literature at Smith College, and remained there until her retirement in 1955. In her last years, she was professor emeritus at Smith.

Chase was the lifelong companion of Eleanor Duckett, a medieval scholar whom she met at Smith, and with whom she lived in Northampton, Massachusetts until her death. Two adjoining residence halls on the Smith campus were later named for Chase and Duckett.

Chase wrote more than 30 books, many using her Maine heritage as the setting. Among them were her novels Mary Peters, Silas Crockett, Windswept, and The Edge of Darkness. The Bible class she taught at Smith became the basis for her books about the Scriptures, including The Bible and the Common Reader, Readings from the Bible, Life and Language in the Old Testament, The Psalms for the Common Reader, and The Prophets for the Common Reader. She authored biographies of Thomas Hardy, Abby Aldrich Rockefeller, and Jonathan Fisher. She was also a regular contributor of stories, essays, and book reviews to The Atlantic Monthly magazine.

The summer home that Chase lived in from 1941 to 1955, Windswept in Steuben, Maine, was the inspiration for her bestselling historical novel Windswept. The property was listed on the National Register of Historic Places in 2007. Chase also maintained a residence in Cambridge, England, where she would spend summers going on lengthy walking trips.

== Awards ==
In 1956 the Women's National Book Association awarded her the Constance Lindsay Skinner Award.

== Death ==
Mary Ellen Chase died on July 28, 1973, at a nursing home in Northampton. She was 86.

== Selected bibliography ==
- His Birthday (1915)
- Thomas Hardy from Serial to Novel (1927)
- The Writing of Informal Essays (1928)
- A Goodly Heritage (1932, autobiography)
- Mary Peters (1934)
- Silas Crockett (1935)
- This England (1936)
- Dawn in Lyonesse (1938)
- A Goodly Fellowship (1939, autobiography)
- Windswept (1941)
- The Bible and the Common Reader (1944)
- The Book of Ruth: from the translation prepared at Cambridge in 1611 for King James (1947)
- Jonathan Fisher, Maine Parson 1768-1847 (1948)
- Readings from the Bible (1952)
- Recipe for a Magic Childhood (1952) autobiographical
- The White Gate (1954)
- Life and Language in the Old Testament (1955)
- The Edge of Darkness (1957)
- Donald McKay and the Clipper Ships (1959)
- The Lovely Ambition (1960)
- The Psalms for the Common Reader (1962)
- The Prophets for the Common Reader (1963)
- The Story of Lighthouses (1965)
- Abby Aldrich Rockefeller (1966)
- Introduction to Sarah Orne Jewett's The Country of the Pointed Firs (1968)
