= Dartmeet =

Confluence of East and West Dart in Devon, England

Coordinates: 50°32′36″N 3°52′34″W

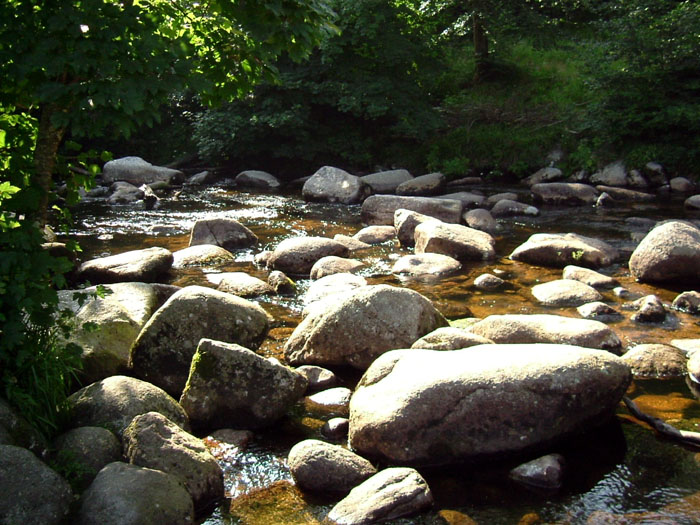
The East Dart at Dartmeet

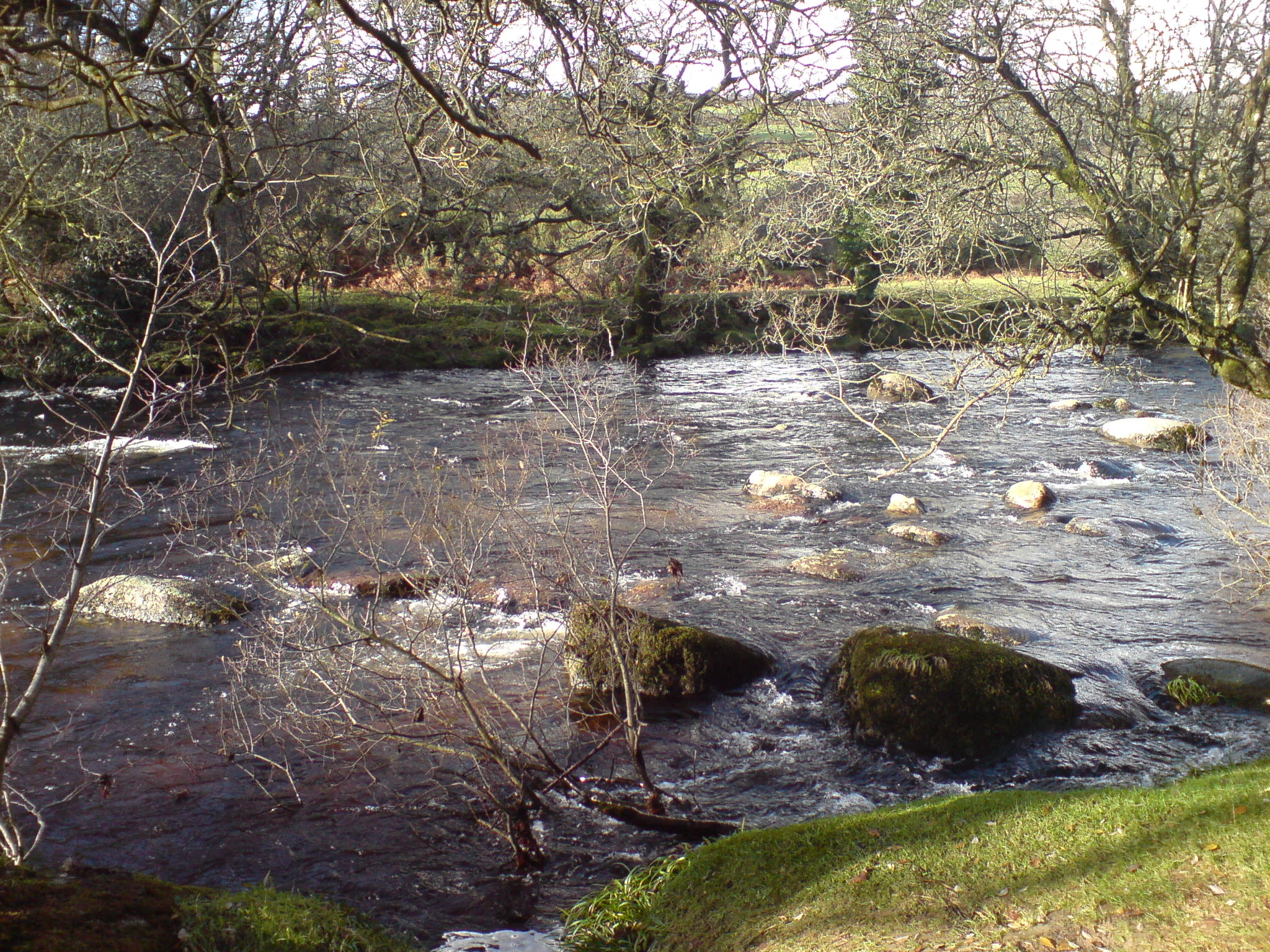
Immediately below Dartmeet

Dartmeet is a popular tourist spot in the centre of Dartmoor, Devon, England at grid reference SX672731.

It lies at the end of the B3357 road, about 4.5 miles (7.2 km) east of Two Bridges. From here, the road continues eastwards as a minor road with restrictions on the size of vehicles, past Poundsgate and over Holne Bridge and New Bridge to Ashburton on the edge of the moor. Immediately east of the river crossing, this road ascends Dartmeet Hill, a long steep hill that climbs 130 metres (430 ft) up the valley side.

As the name suggests, Dartmeet is the meeting point of the two major tributaries of the River Dart: the East Dart and West Dart. The road bridge, built in 1792, spans the East Dart; just above it, at the side of the large carpark is an earlier, possibly medieval, clapper bridge, now partially collapsed. The actual confluence of the two rivers is just downstream of the bridge. Dartmeet is the official put in for the Upper Dart section of the River Dart for whitewater kayakers and canoeists.

== History ==
Dartmeet is at the centre of an internationally important archaeological landscape mainly due to its prehistoric field systems, delineated by reaves, which are among the best preserved in north west Europe.

Dartmeet was one of the boundary points mentioned (though not by name) in the 1240 Perambulation of the Forest of Dartmoor, the boundary coming down the East Dart from the Wallabrook, and continuing up the West Dart to the foot of the O Brook. The first documentary reference to the name (as Dartameet) was in a Duchy of Cornwall document dated 1616.

Halfway up Dartmeet Hill, close to the road, lies the Coffin Stone on which coffins would be placed to allow the bearers to take a rest on the way to taking bodies for burial at Widecombe-in-the-Moor. The rock is split in two, along its length. Local legend has it that the body of a particularly wicked man was laid there. God took exception to this, and struck the stone with a thunderbolt, destroying the coffin and splitting the stone in two.
