= Upper Dart =

Part of the River Dart in Devon, England

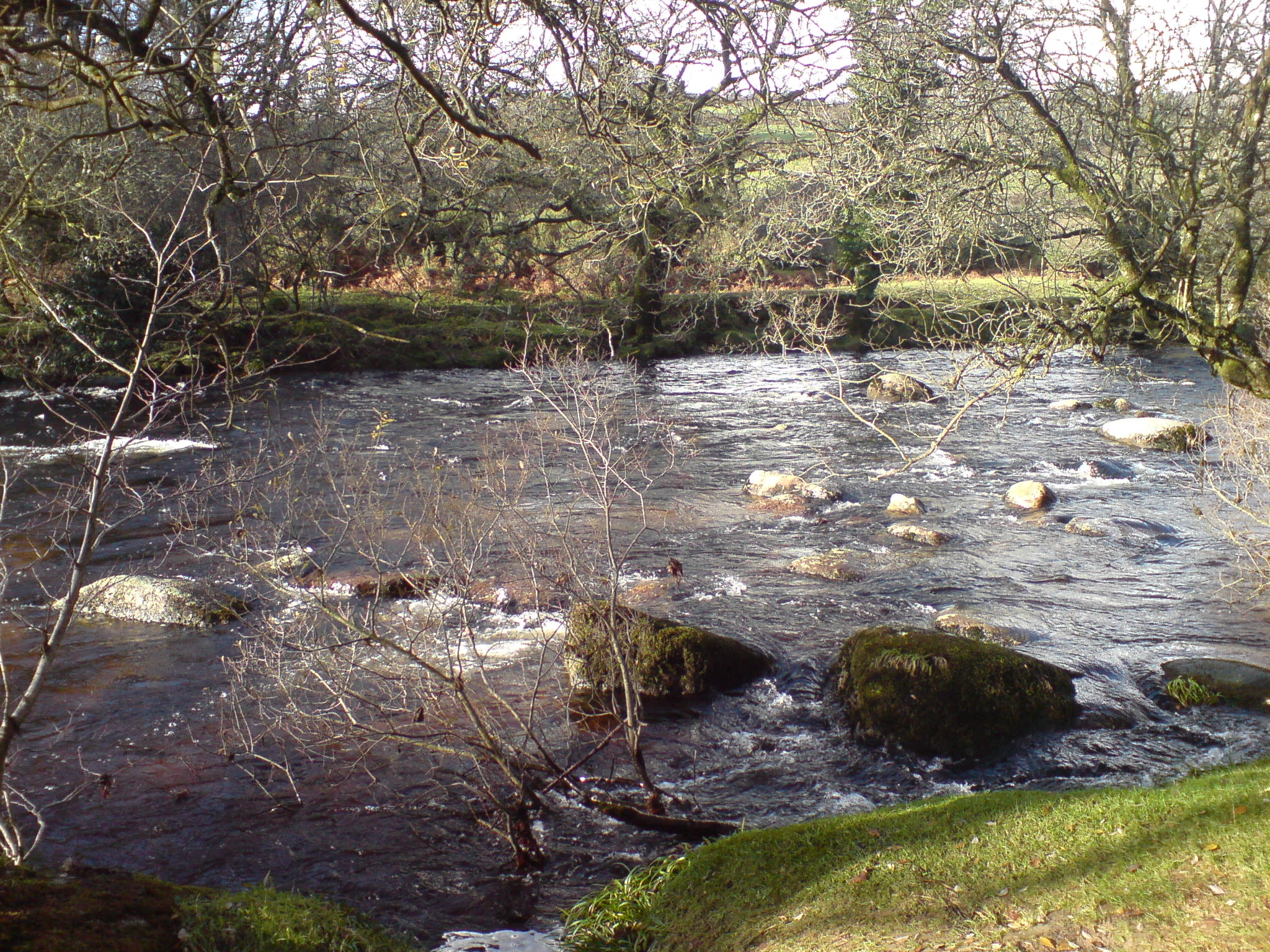
Simple Grade 1/2 rapids below Dartmeet

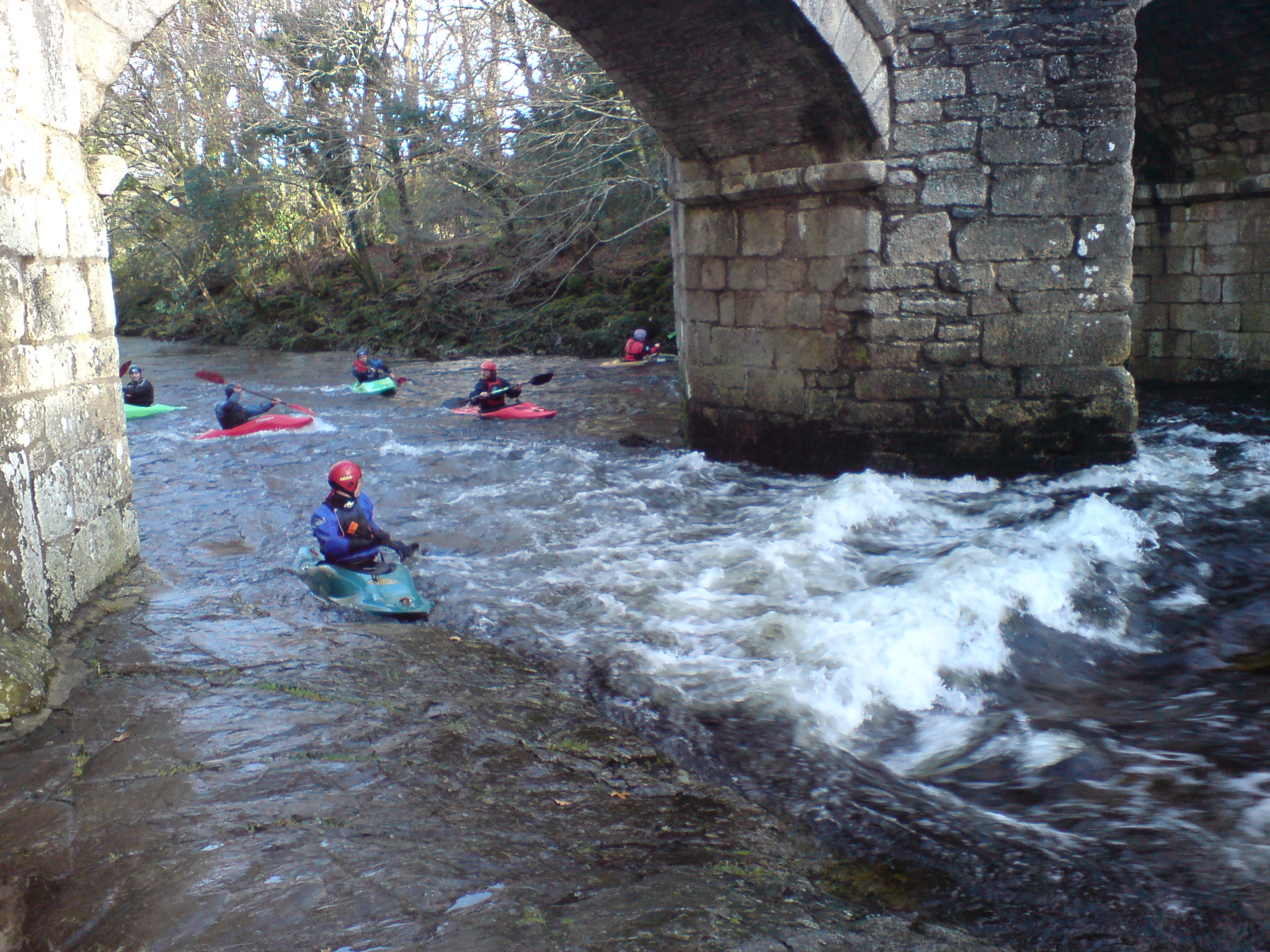
Newbridge egress point

Upper Dart is a section of the River Dart, Dartmoor. It is perhaps the second most popular section of whitewater for kayakers and canoeists in England, particularly for experienced paddlers. This section is followed on by the Dart Loop.

== Overview ==
The section's length is approximately 4.3 miles (6.9 kilometres) in length.

This section is loosely Graded at 4, but varies tremendously on rain and ground water levels. The Dart has been known to rise in minutes, changing drastically from a quiet trickle to a raging torrent.

== Whitewater information ==
=== Water levels ===
There is a gauge on the section below which gives an accurate level, however this requires you to run that section in order to see it. It is much easier to see the level at Newbridge before driving to the get in. This gauge is known as the slab, on the river left at the "put-in" for the "loop" section.

- Low: from the lowest point of the slab; if the water is not up to the top edge, the water level conditions are low. Starts as a technical Grade 3, and works up to a low Grade 4.
- Medium: on or close to the edge is deemed medium water. Mainly Grade 4.
- High: when the slab is covered high water conditions apply. Grade 4+, with the last few kilometres pushing up to Grade 5.
- Spate: on the steps leading down to the water's edge is spate conditions. Later sections are a serious Grade 5+ undertaking.

=== Access point ===
The river East Dart runs through the car park, and access to the river can be made from here. The best "put in" is to walk out of the car park, over the road, and then down to the river's edge just downstream of the road bridge, just upstream from Dartmeet.

=== Notable rapids ===
The Upper Dart section has an easier run in and run out of the main section of rapids in the middle of the run. Within this middle section there are a number of features on the Upper Dart, only notable rapids are mentioned here. These are referred to in English White Water by the British Canoe Union.

==== Boulder Garden ====
The first significant steep rapid made up of numerous boulders. The entry is straight forward, and the twisting path makes for the first Class IV whitewater, where a long pool Eagle Flats awaits below.

==== Lucky Tor ====
An island divides the flow, with a long boulder garden down the left, and easy rapids to a steeper exit on the right. Towards the end of the island, the two channels join to make a steep exit into a bedrock feature.

==== Broad Ledge ====
After a long straight, the river bends river and drops over 3 wide bedrock ledges, that at low and medium flows is straight forward, and the water level increases, more significant stoppers form on each of the ledges.

==== Mad Mile ====
A series of river wide ledges and slides, with a large pool, Mel Pool, halfway down. Much easier in low water, but at high levels many stoppers are powerful and hold swimmers. Sneak routes exist, and should be used. A series of ledges from Broadledge, finish in a diagonal ramp at Mel Pool, where in high water makes for a huge cushion wave and the centre of difficulties when in flood. Mel Pool Steps, has a number of routes, with the a series of small slides that leads to easier water. This section also belies its name – it's closer to half a mile.

==== Euthanasia Falls ====
A diagonal drop with cushion wave, chunky stopper, large rocks with the water funnelled between them. A chicken chute exists at certain levels.

==== Sharrah's Pool or Pandora's Box or Surprise Surprise ====
Complex rocky set of drops, complete with siphons. River left section has a slot, middle section has rocks with a high possibility of pinning. More dangerous at lower water levels, at high levels it can wash out.

=== Egress point ===
Newbridge is the official BCU egress point.
