= Jennifer Clulow =

British actress and television presenter (born 1942)

- Born: 30 March 1942 (age 84); Grimsby, Lincolnshire
- Occupation: Actress • TV presenter
- Spouse: Michael McStay (m. 1967; died 2025)
- Children: 2

Jennifer Clulow (born 30 March 1942) is a British actress and television presenter, best known for her appearances in a series of television advertisements for Cointreau. She first came to attention in the 1960s in various drama series, including Mr Rose (1968), in which her character, Jessica Dalton, succeeded Drusilla Lamb (Gillian Lewis) as secretary to the retired Chief Inspector Rose (William Mervyn).

Clulow was born in Grimsby, Lincolnshire. She appeared as an actress in many television series of the period, including The Avengers,’’ Keeping Up Appearances’’,No Hiding Place and Department S, and played a small role in the 1967 comedy film Carry On Don't Lose Your Head. In the same year she succeeded Francesca Annis as presenter of the children's series Disney Wonderland, which also featured Tony Bateman and Tony Hart. A series of Disney characters appeared as live actors in costume, voices being dubbed live by a single voice talent from a separate sound dock, with Clulow as the human presenter.

Between 1974 and 1988, Clulow appeared in a series of television commercials for Cointreau, playing an Englishwoman named Catherine flirting with a Frenchman (Christian Toma) over after-dinner liqueurs. Clulow worked as a continuity announcer and newsreader for Westward Television from the late 1970s until 1981. A year later, she joined the announcing staff of TVS (Television South) for around five years. Upon leaving TVS, she became a relief announcer for TSW.

She was married to actor Michael McStay from 1967 until his death in 2025. They had two children together, sons Darius and Paul.
