= River Dart =

River in Devon, England

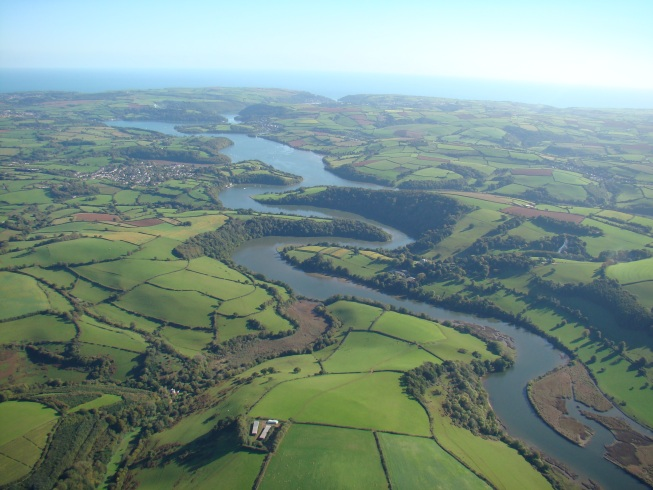

Location
- Country: England
- County: Devon

Physical characteristics
- Source: West Dart
  - location: Lower White Tor
  - elevation: 450 m (1,480 ft)
- 2nd source: East Dart
  - location: Kit Rock, Whinney's Down
  - elevation: 510 m (1,670 ft)
- Source confluence
  - location: Dartmeet
  - elevation: 210 m (690 ft)
- Mouth: English Channel
  - coordinates: 50°20′33″N 3°33′51″W
  - elevation: 0 m (0 ft)
- Length: 75 km (47 mi)
- Discharge
  - location: Austins Bridge, Buckfastleigh
  - average: 11.04 m^{3}/s (390 cu ft/s)
  - maximum: 40 m^{3}/s (1,400 cu ft/s)

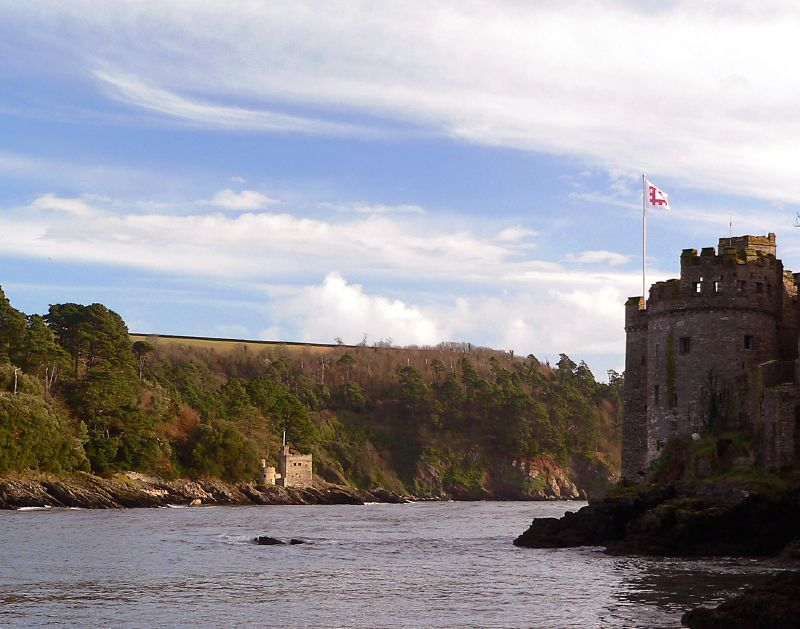
Dartmouth and Kingswear Castles guard the mouth of the River Dart

The River Dart is a river in Devon, England, that rises high on Dartmoor and flows for 75 kilometres (47 mi) to the sea at Dartmouth.

== Name ==
Most hydronyms in England derive from the Brythonic language (from which the river's subsequent names ultimately derive from an original Celtic etymology. As the lower stretches of the river are still covered in ancient oak woodlands, it is accepted that the first element derives from dar-, meaning 'oak' (Cornish: derow, Welsh: derw). However the second element (evident in the hard consonantal termination of Dar-t) is less certain, with postulated etymologies from Darwent / Derventio ('sacred place of oak') or Darnant / Darant ('oak stream').

The Ravenna Cosmography records a number of Latinised names for the area, Devionisso Statio and Deventiasteno may represent corrupted doublets of a statio ('station') on a river named Derventio. Although the name Derventio is otherwise unattested for the river, it is an established etymology throughout Britain, found at the River Darent, Derwentwater, and a number of rivers named Derwent. Anna Eliza Bray recorded that a version of the name, Darant was still in common usage as late as 1832.

== Watercourse ==
The river begins as two separate branches (the East Dart and West Dart), which join at Dartmeet. The paths along these rivers offer very attractive walking, and there are several small waterfalls. The rivers are crossed by a number of clapper bridges, notably at the hamlet of Postbridge.

After leaving the moor, the Dart flows southwards past Buckfast Abbey and through the towns of Buckfastleigh, Dartington and Totnes. At Totnes, where there is a seventeenth-century weir (rebuilt in the 1960s), it becomes tidal, and there are no bridges below the town.

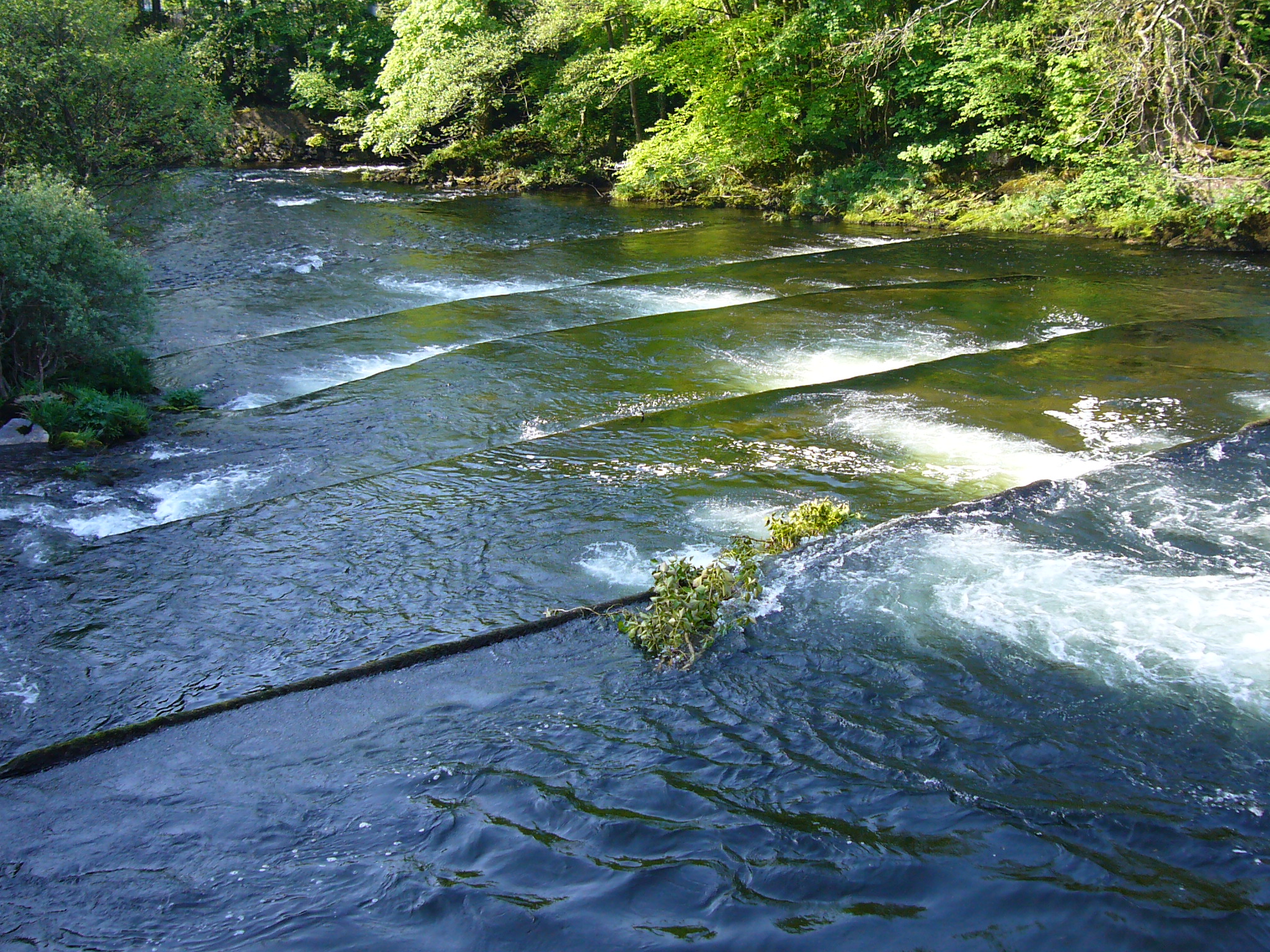
The River Dart showing the lower part of the fish ladder near Buckfastleigh

A passenger ferry operates across the river from the village of Dittisham to a point adjacent to the Greenway Estate. Formerly the home of the crime writer Agatha Christie, this has views across the river, and the house and gardens are now owned by the National Trust and are open to the public.

The entrance to the river from the sea is a rocky entrance with cliffs either side. On the East side Kingswear Castle sits very close to the water's edge, and on the west side Dartmouth Castle is built on a rocky promontory at sea level. The castles once operated a defensive chain across the estuary, which was raised at dusk to destroy enemy ships attempting to attack the harbour.

== Crossings ==
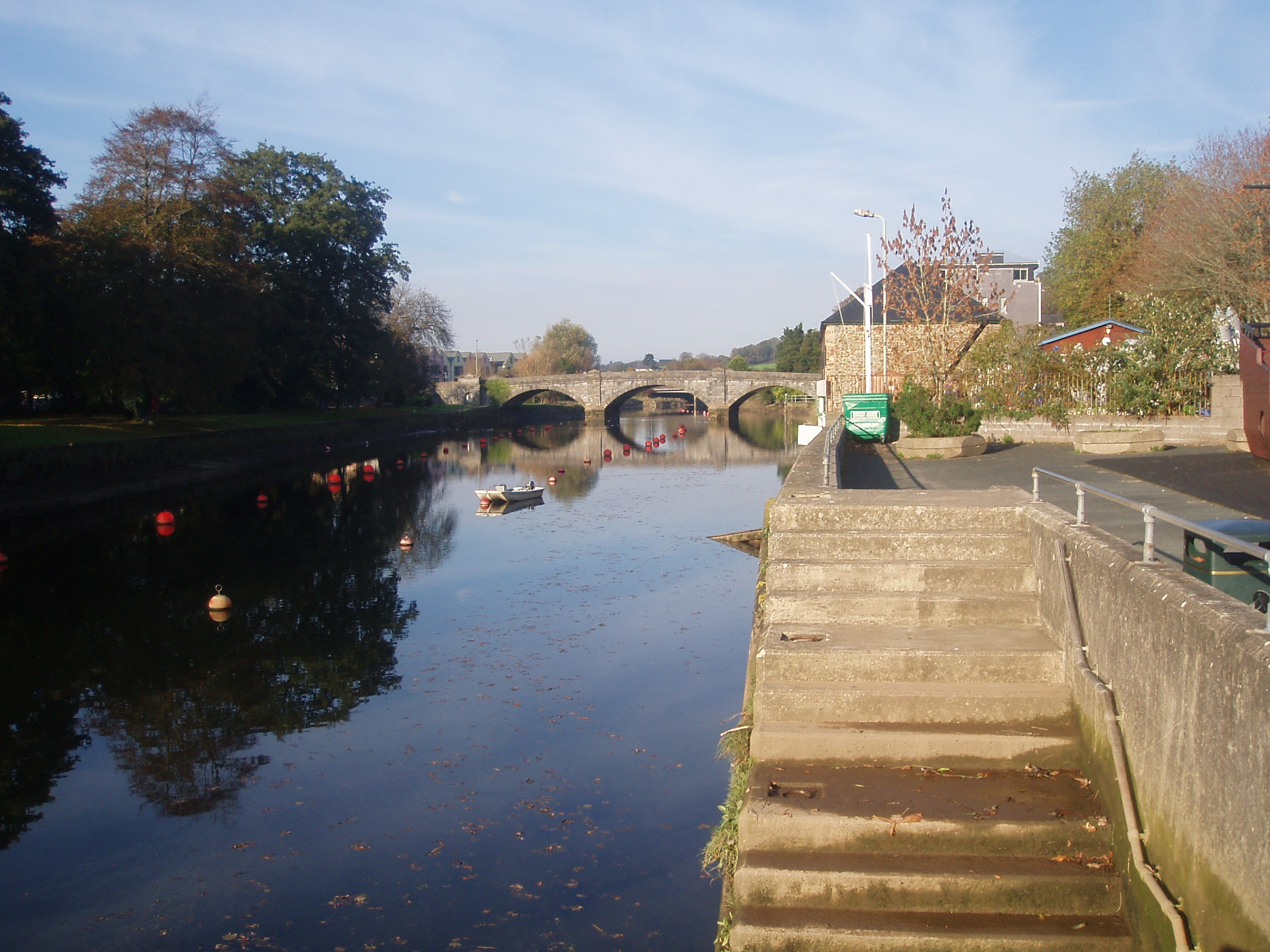
The River Dart facing upstream at Totnes, with Totnes Bridge in the background

The flooded ria that forms the lower reaches of the Dart, with its deep water and steeply sloping valley sides, is a considerable barrier to crossing traffic. There are no bridges below Totnes.

At the mouth of the river, it separates the communities of Dartmouth and Kingswear. There have been proposals to bridge the river here, but these have come to nothing. Instead the two places are linked by, in order going upstream, the Lower Ferry, Passenger Ferry and Higher Ferry. The Lower and Higher ferries both carry vehicles, the Higher one linking the A379 road.

Some 2.5 miles (4.0 km) upstream of Dartmouth, the Greenway Ferry carries pedestrians across the river from the village of Dittisham to Greenway Quay.

A further 5 miles (8.0 km) upstream is Totnes, where the river is spanned by two road bridges, a railway bridge and a footbridge over. Totnes Bridge is the nearest bridge to the sea and is a road bridge built in 1826–1828 by Charles Fowler. Some 1,000 feet (300 m) upstream is Brutus Bridge, constructed in 1982 as part of a road traffic-relief scheme and carrying the concurrent A385 and A381 roads. A further 0.5 miles (0.80 km) upstream, the railway bridge carries the National Rail Exeter to Plymouth line over the river. Immediately upstream of the railway bridge is a footbridge, built in 1993 to provide access to the Totnes (Riverside) terminus of the South Devon Railway.

== Navigation ==
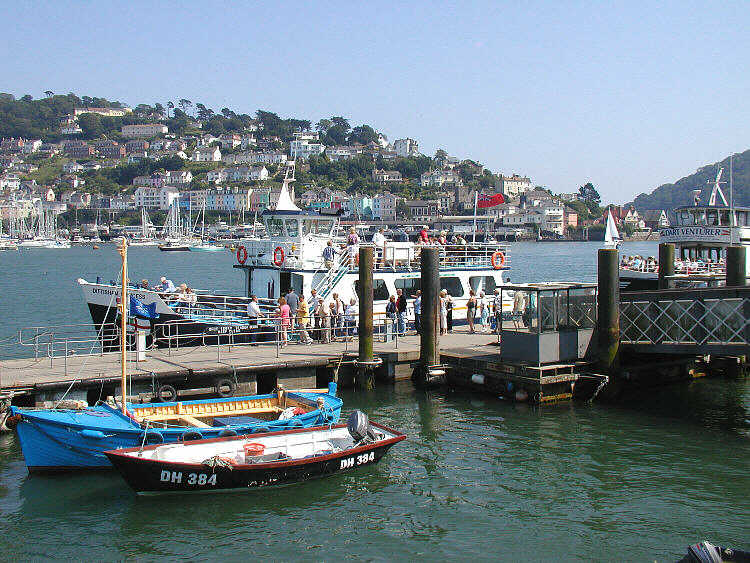
Dartmouth Harbour, with Kingswear in the background, and river cruise boats alongside Dartmouth Town Jetty

The lower section of the River Dart forms Dartmouth Harbour, a deep water natural harbour with a long history of maritime usage. In modern times, the port's commercial activity has declined, but it is still a busy port for local fishing vessels and a wide variety of yachts and other private boats. Several local companies specialise in shipbuilding and repairs to small tonnage craft.

Dartmouth is also the home of the Britannia Royal Naval College and as a result is routinely visited by sizeable naval ships. Smaller naval tenders are often seen carrying out training exercises in the harbour and river. Large cruise ships are occasional visitors, with the largest visitor to date being the MV Royal Princess (30,277 GT).

Upstream, the Dart is navigable to seagoing vessels as far as the weir in Totnes. The river almost dries out for 2 miles (3.2 km) below Totnes at spring tide low water, but vessels drawing up to 3 foot (0.91 m) can proceed to Totnes from one and a half hours after low water. Above the weir, the river is navigable only to small craft such as kayaks and canoes.

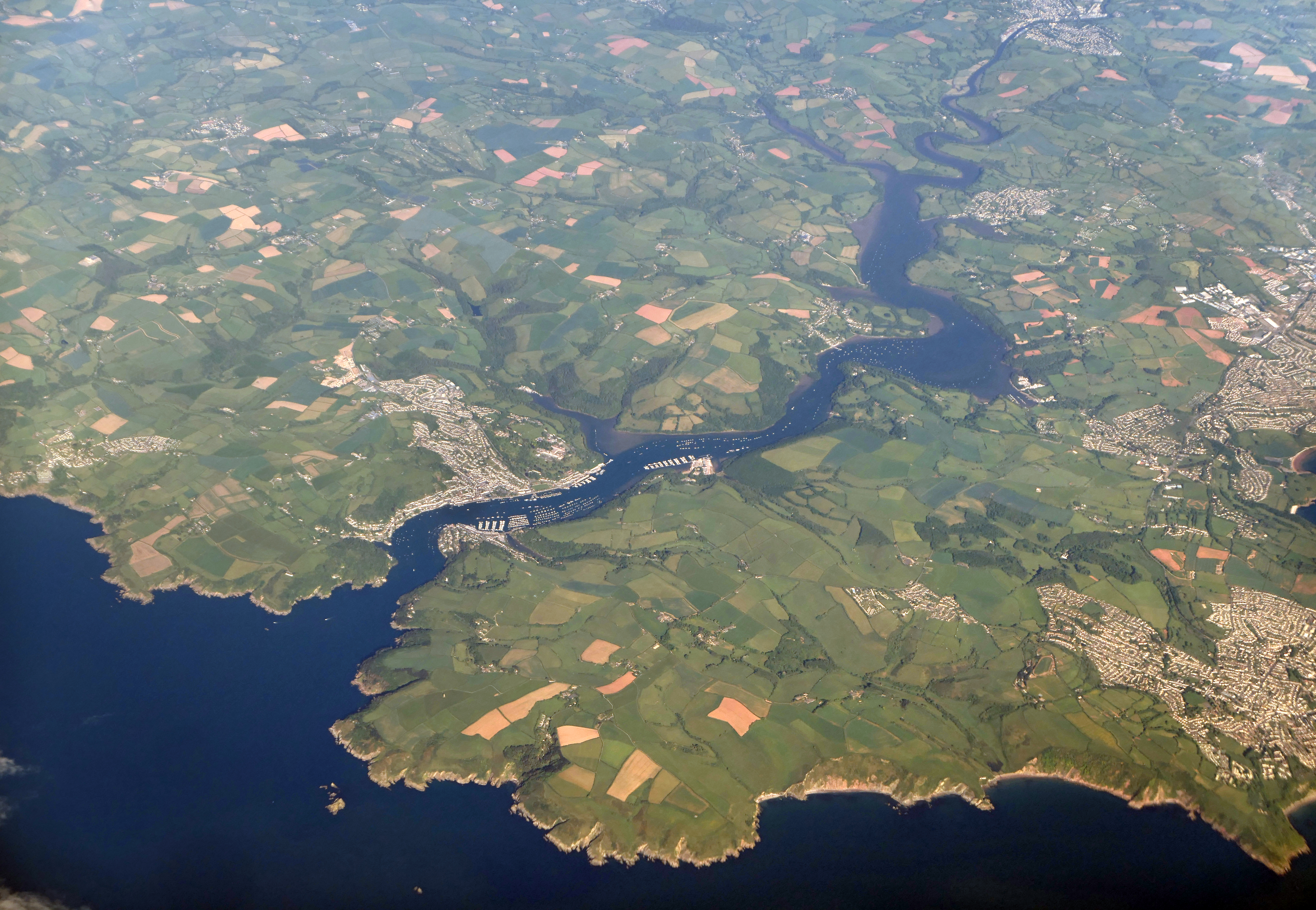
Aerial view of the Dart estuary.

Several companies operate trips on the river, including Dart Pleasure Craft Limited, who also trade as River Link and operate the passenger ferry between Dartmouth and Kingswear. These include cruises from Dartmouth to Totnes, which can be combined with journeys on the Paignton and Dartmouth Steam Railway and an open-top bus between the towns of Totnes and Paignton to create a circular trip.

The harbour and port are both leisure boating locations, and several marinas and boat yards are located on the river. The Port of Dartmouth Royal Regatta takes place annually over three days at the end of August.

== Canoeing and kayaking ==
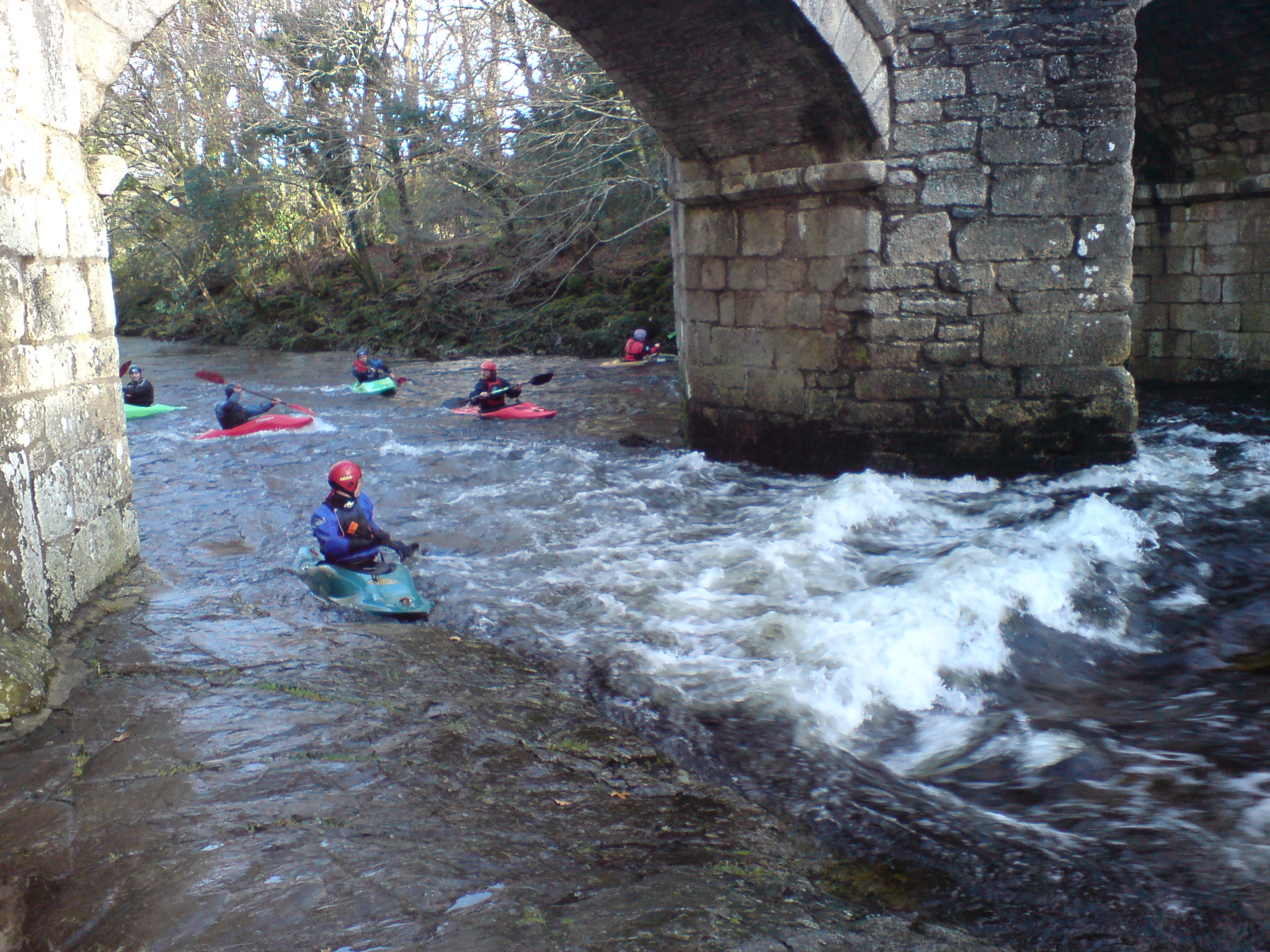
Kayakers playing on a wave under Newbridge

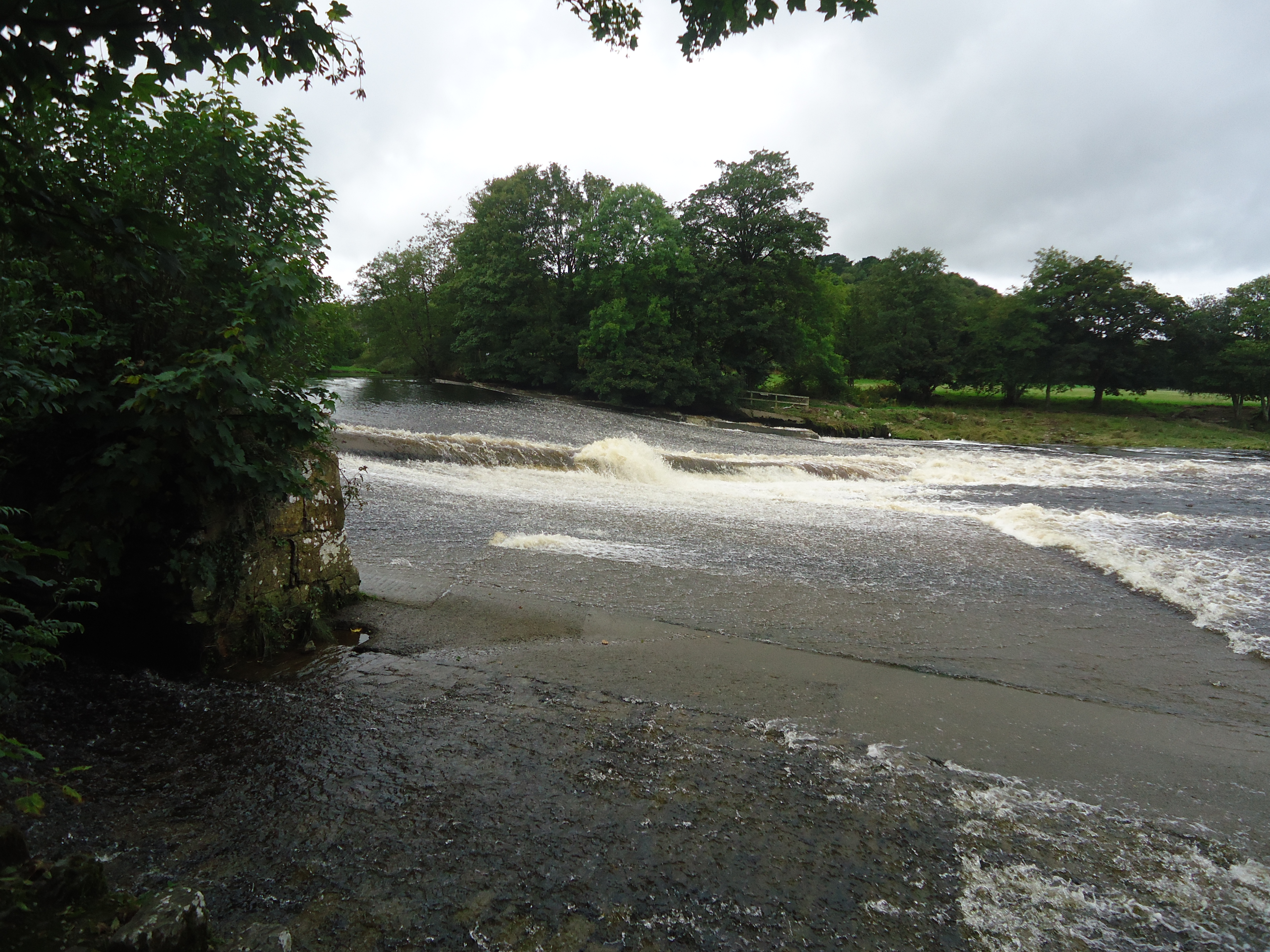
The weir at Totnes

The upper reaches of Dartmoor, especially those on the Dart, are a focal point for whitewater kayakers and canoeists. The best known sections of the river are:

- Upper Dart from Dartmeet to Newbridge (Grade 3/4 (higher in high water), advanced run).
- The Loop from Newbridge to Holne Bridge (Grade 2/3, beginner/intermediate run).
- The Lower from Holne Bridge to Buckfastleigh (Grade 2, beginner section).

Sections of the East and West Dart above Dartmeet, as well as the Webburn are also paddled when conditions permit. This is somewhat controversial, as riparian landowners and those responsible for local fisheries maintain that the East and West Dart should not be paddled.

The lower reaches of the Dart, including the estuary are suitable for flat water touring.

== Gallery ==
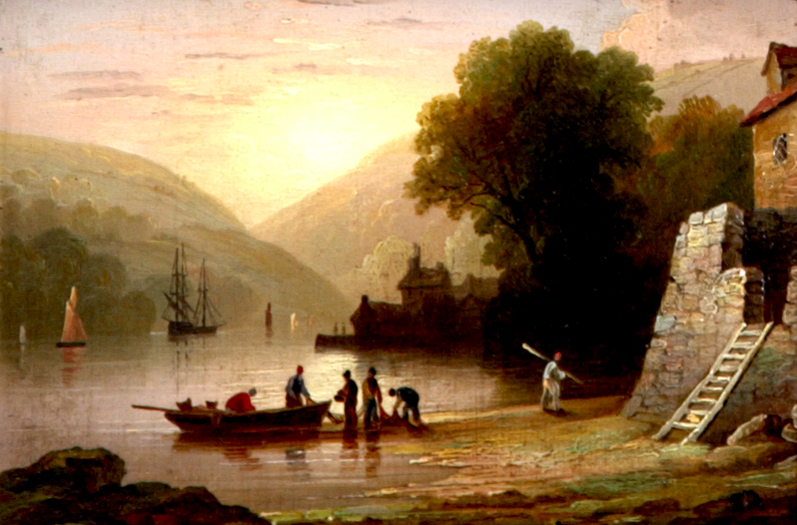
Dittisham on the River Dart, oil painting by John Wallace Tucker, between 1865 and 1867

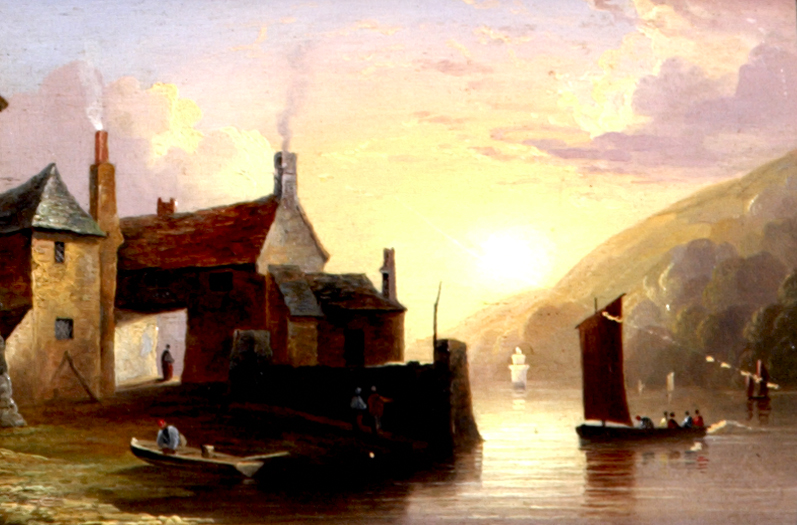
Kingswear on the River Dart, oil painting by John Wallace Tucker, between 1865 and 1867

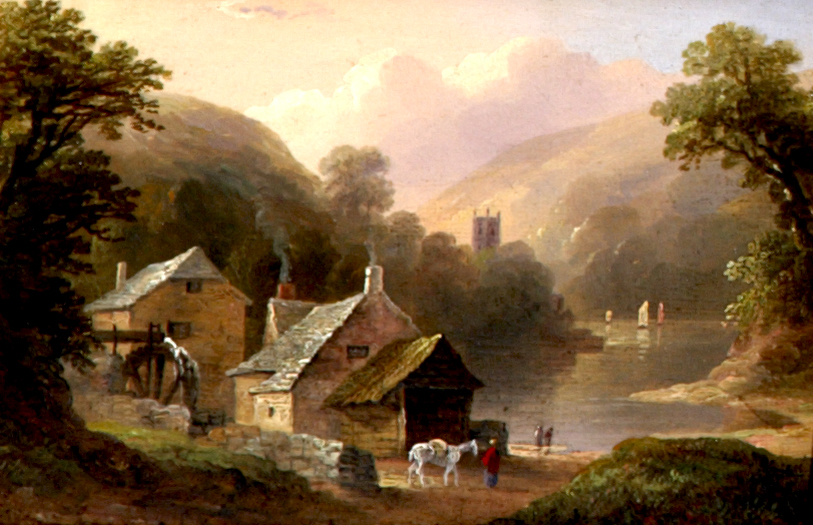
Kingswear Mills on the River Dart, oil painting by John Wallace Tucker, between 1865 and 1867

== See also ==
- Rivers of the United Kingdom
- Rolls-Royce Dart, a turboprop engine named after the river
