= Postbridge =

Hamlet in Devon, England

Coordinates: 50°35.648′N 3°54.669′W

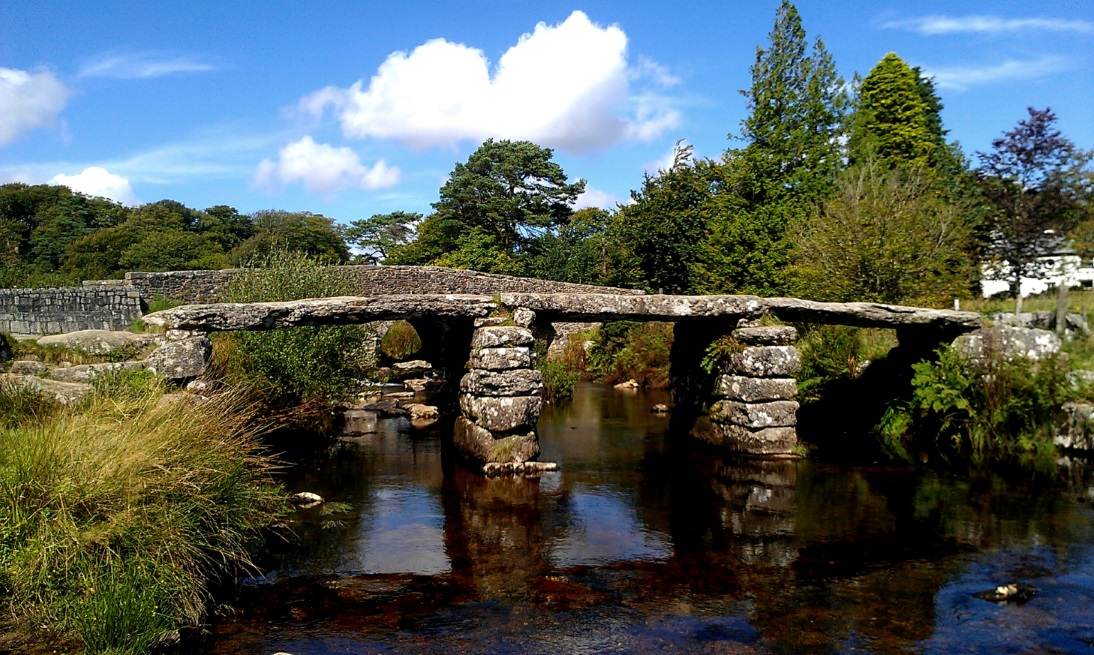
Clapper bridge at Postbridge, dating from the 13th century

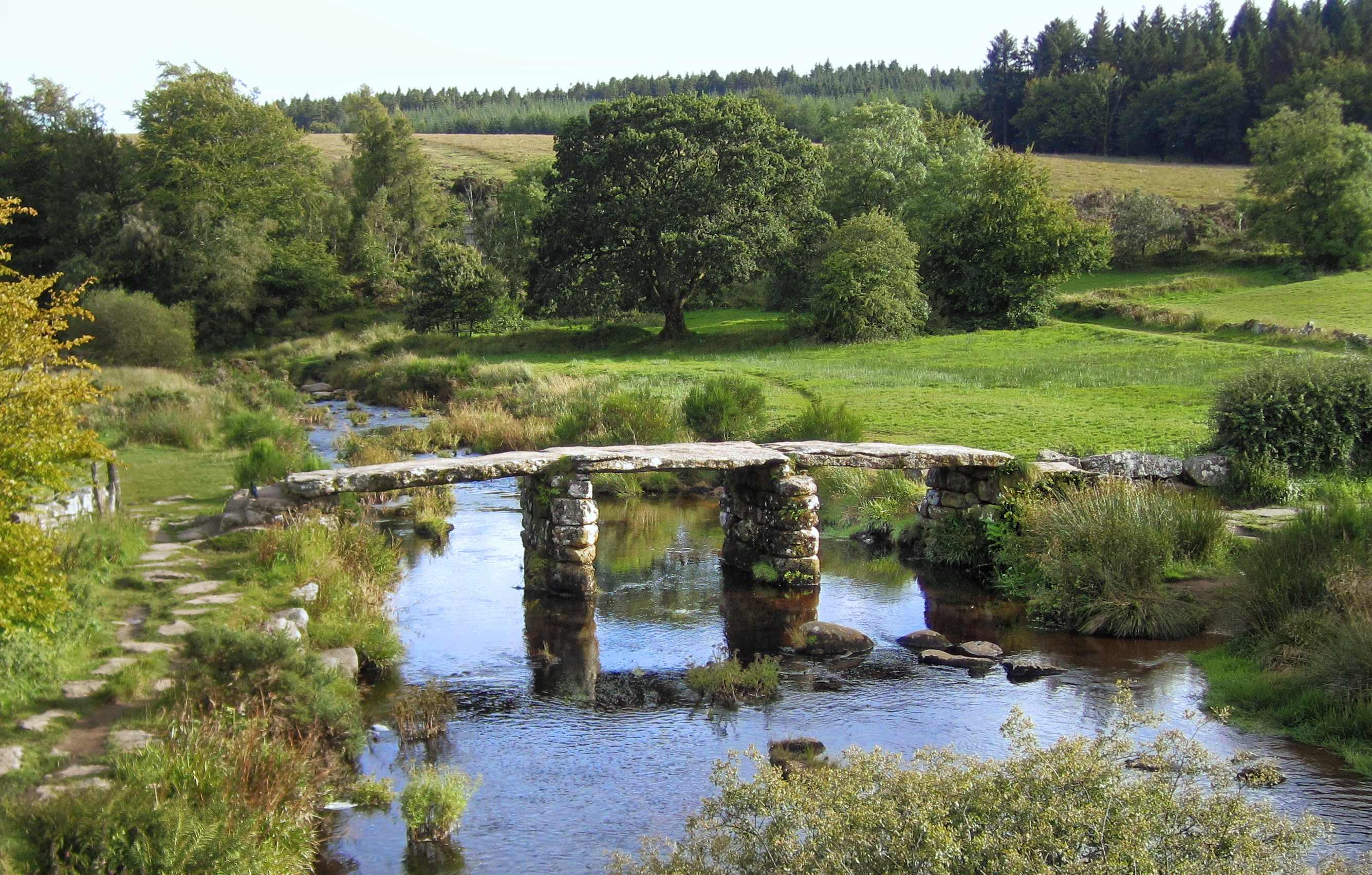
The Clapper Bridge at Postbridge taken from the existing road bridge looking south

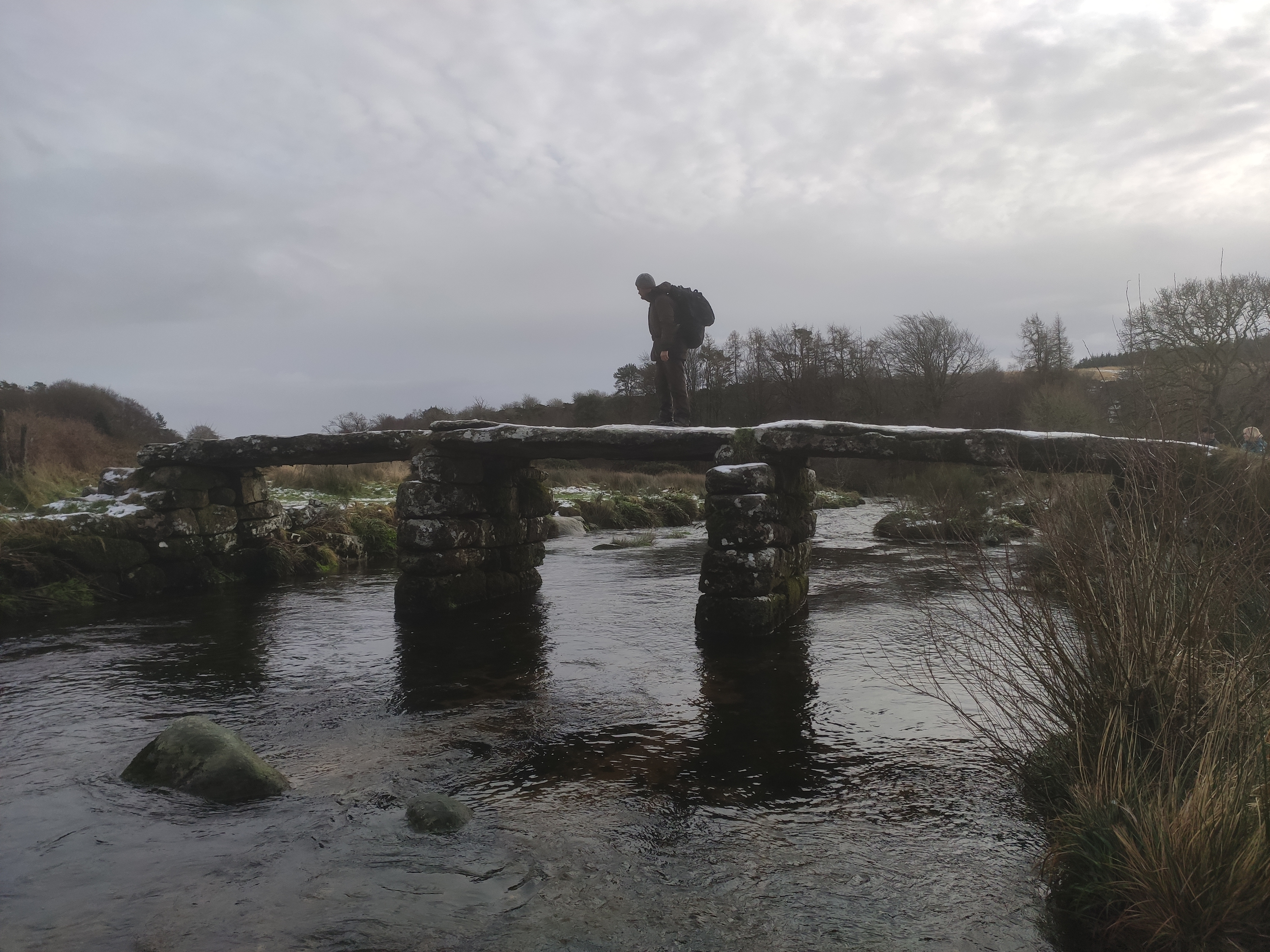
Clapper bridge at Postbridge, Dartmoor.

Postbridge is a hamlet in the heart of Dartmoor in the English county of Devon. It lies on the B3212, roughly midway between Princetown and Moretonhampstead.

Postbridge is on the East Dart river, one of two main tributaries of the River Dart, and consists of a few houses, a shop, a pub and hotel, and a national park tourist information centre.

Postbridge is best known for its fine example of an ancient clapper bridge over the river. First recorded in the 14th century, the bridge is believed to have been built in the 13th century to enable pack horses to cross, carrying tin to the stannary town of Tavistock. The clapper bridge, a Grade II* listed structure, stands alongside a Grade II-listed bridge built in the 1780s.

The settlement is also infamous for the ghost story of the Hairy Hands, which supposedly manifest themselves on a road near the village.
