= List of No Hiding Place episodes =

This is a list of episodes from the British television series, No Hiding Place that ran for 10 series from 1959 to 1967. Of the 236 episodes produced, 194 are missing, 30 survive and 12 are incomplete.

== Series overview ==
Series	Episodes	Originally released		Status
Series	Episodes	First released	Last released	Status
1	20	16 September 1959	27 January 1960	18 missing
2	26	5 May 1960	28 October 1960	25 missing
3	26	3 February 1961	4 August 1961	20 missing, 1 incomplete
4	44	8 May 1962	19 March 1963	27 missing, 8 incomplete
5	26	2 July 1963	6 January 1964	24 missing, 2 incomplete
6	26	6 April 1964	12 October 1964	All missing
7	26	1 February 1965	26 July 1965	16 missing
8	13	3 November 1965	26 January 1966	All missing
9	13	4 May 1966	27 July 1966	11 missing, 1 incomplete
10	15	15 March 1967	22 June 1967	14 missing
Unknown		1966		Exists

== Series 1 (1959–1960) ==
No. Overall	No. In Series	Episode Title	Original Broadcast Date	Archive Status
1	1	"The Talking Doll"	16 September 1959	Exists
2	2	"Checkmate"	23 September 1959	Missing
3	3	"Wheels of Fury"	30 September 1959	Missing
4	4	"A Genuine Sale of Murder"	7 October 1959	Missing
5	5	"The Stalag Story"	14 October 1959	Missing
6	6	"The Sharp Knife"	21 October 1959	Missing
7	7	"Call Me a Killer"	28 October 1959	Missing
8	8	"Everybody Loves Jerry"	4 November 1959	Missing
9	9	"The Man Who Left His Coat"	11 November 1959	Missing
10	10	"Murder with Witnesses"	18 November 1959	Missing
11	11	"Ring of Fear"	25 November 1959	Missing
12	12	"With Suicidal Intent"	2 December 1959	Missing
13	13	"No Wreath for Clive"	9 December 1959	Missing
14	14	"Black Fashion"	16 December 1959	Missing
15	15	"Stranger in the Parlour"	23 December 1959	Missing
16	16	"Who Is Gustav Varnia?"	30 December 1959	Missing
17	17	"Victim of the Dark"	6 January 1960	Exists
18	18	"The Golden Clown"	13 January 1960	Missing
19	19	"A Man of Straw"	20 January 1960	Missing
20	20	"The Final Chance"	27 January 1960	Missing

== Series 2 (1960) ==
No. Overall	No In Series	Episode Title	Original Broadcast Date	Archive Status
21	1	"The Long Day"	5 May 1960	Missing
22	2	"The Head Case"	12 May 1960	Missing
23	3	"Stop Press"	19 May 1960	Missing
24	4	"Man's Best Friend"	26 May 1960	Missing
25	5	"Two Blind Mice"	2 June 1960	Exists
26	6	"Six Eyes on a Stranger"	9 June 1960	Missing
27	7	"The Last Flight of the Eel	16 June 1960	Missing
28	8	"Bed of Roses"	23 June 1960	Missing
29	9	"A Straight White Line"	30 June 1960	Missing
30	10	"State Visit"	7 July 1960	Missing
31	11	"The Constant Widow"	14 July 1960	Missing
32	12	"Raising Old Harry"	21 July 1960	Missing
33	13	"The Last Deal"	28 July 1960	Missing
34	14	"Three Small Bones"	4 August 1960	Missing
35	15	"Trial and Error"	11 August 1960	Missing
36	16	"The Burning Question"	18 August 1960	Missing
37	17	"The Missing Moorhen"	25 August 1960	Missing
38	18	"Dog Eat Dog"	1 September 1960	Missing
39	19	"Double Fugue"	8 September 1960	Missing
40	20	"Two-Time Loser"	16 September 1960	Missing
41	21	"Girl in the Shadow"	23 September 1960	Missing
42	22	"The Goat's Whiskers"	30 September 1960	Missing
43	23	"A Very Respectable Man"	7 October 1960	Missing
44	24	"Point of Release"	14 October 1960	Missing
45	25	"Fair Lady"	21 October 1960	Missing
46	26	"Footsteps on the Ceiling"	28 October 1960	Missing

== Series 3 (1961) ==
No. Overall	No In Series	Episode Title	Original Broadcast Date	Archive Status
47	1	"The Slippery Deck"	3 February 1961	Missing
48	2	"The Long Stretch"	10 February 1961	Missing
49	3	"Man in the Dark"	17 February 1961	Missing
50	4	"A Warrant for Joe Roberts"	24 February 1961	Missing
51	5	"Never Dine with Dead Men"	3 March 1961	Missing
52	6	"The Widower"	10 March 1961	Exists
53	7	"Whistle and I'll Come"	17 March 1961	Exists
54	8	"Payment in Kind"	24 March 1961	Missing
55	9	"The Toy House"	7 April 1961	Missing
56	10	"A Girl Like Xanthe"	14 April 1961	Missing
57	11	"Nina and the Night People"	21 April 1961	Missing
58	12	"Told by a Dead Man"	28 April 1961	Exists
59	13	"No Tears for Toby"	5 May 1961	Missing
60	14	"Fever"	12 May 1961	Missing
61	15	"The Missing Suit"	19 May 1961	Missing
62	16	"Mr. and Mrs. Smith"	26 May 1961	Missing
63	17	"Finale"	2 June 1961	Missing
64	18	"Process of Elimination"	9 June 1961	Incomplete
65	19	"Signals at Danger"	16 June 1961	Missing
66	20	"The Final Fling"	23 June 1961	Missing
67	21	"Explosion Underground"	30 June 1961	Missing
68	22	"With Intent to Kill"	7 July 1961	Missing
69	23	"The White Stick"	14 July 1961	Exists
70	24	"Caught and Bowled"	21 July 1961	Missing
71	25	"Silent and Witnesses"	28 July 1961	Missing
72	26	"Dead Ringer"	4 August 1961	Exists

== Series 4 (1962–1963) ==
No. Overall	No In Series	Episode Title	Original Broadcast Date	Archive Status
73	1	"A Touch of Nitrate"	8 May 1962	Missing
74	2	"Accessories After the Fact"	15 May 1962	Exists
75	3	"Little Girl Stolen"	22 May 1962	Missing
76	4	"A Job for Johnny"	29 May 1962	Missing
77	5	"Cover Story"	5 June 1962	Missing
78	6	"Third Party Risk"	12 June 1962	Incomplete
79	7	"Convicts Wife"	19 June 1962	Missing
80	8	"Car in Flames"	26 June 1962	Incomplete
81	9	"A Surprise for Mr. Kemp"	3 July 1962	Missing
82	10	"Epitaph for Johnnie"	10 July 1962	Missing
83	11	"The Bank Job"	17 July 1962	Incomplete
84	12	"Inquest on an Idol"	24 July 1962	Exists
85	13	"The Skeleton Wore Boots"	31 July 1962	Missing
86	14	"The Common Murder"	7 August 1962	Incomplete
87	15	"The Playing Guests"	14 August 1962	Missing
88	16	"Thirty Seconds from Now"	21 August 1962	Incomplete
89	17	"Whatever Happened to Wally?"	28 August 1962	Missing
90	18	"A Cool Million"	4 September 1962	Incomplete
91	19	"Straight to the Grave"	11 September 1962	Missing
92	20	"A Talk with Yargo Simms"	18 September 1962	Missing
93	21	"The Most Beautiful Room in the World"	25 September 1962	Missing
94	22	"Top of the Ladder"	2 October 1962	Missing
95	23	"Time to Kill"	9 October 1962	Incomplete
96	24	"A Run for the Sea"	23 October 1962	Missing
97	25	"Key to Murder"	30 October 1962	Incomplete
98	26	"Corpse for the Cup"	6 November 1962	Missing
99	27	"Contents Noted"	13 November 1962	Exists
100	28	"Unfinished Business"	20 November 1962	Missing
101	29	"The Girl in the Rain"	27 November 1962	Missing
102	30	"Date for Deception"	4 December 1962	Missing
103	31	"Night of the Game"	11 December 1962	Missing
104	32	"The Front Man"	18 December 1962	Exists
105	33	"100,000 Halfpennies"	25 December 1962	Missing
106	34	"Death on the Doorstep"	1 January 1963	Exists
107	35	"Who Killed 'Cock' Robbin?"	8 January 1963	Missing
108	36	"The Image of Frank Brown"	15 January 1963	Missing
109	37	"Beware of the Weepers"	22 January 1963	Exists
110	38	"A Pocketful of Bones"	29 January 1963	Exists
111	39	"The Imagination of Taffy Lewis"	5 February 1963	Missing
112	40	"Operation Tiptoe"	12 February 1963	Exists
113	41	"Tell Them Upstairs"	19 February 1963	Missing
114	42	"Hot Ice"	26 February 1963	Missing
115	43	“Dead Certainty"	12 March 1963	Missing
116	44	"A Bird to Watch the Marbles"	19 March 1963	Exists

== Series 5 (1963–1964) ==
No. Overall	No In Series	Episode Title	Original Broadcast Date	Archive Status
117	1	"Alibis Are Fixed"	2 July 1963	Missing
118	2	"Four Faces of Clare"	9 July 1963	Missing
119	3	"A Ticket for the Nudes"	16 July 1963	Missing
120	4	"All Dead and Buried"	23 July 1963	Missing
121	5	"Last Flight"	30 July 1963	Missing
122	6	"Alexander's Ragtime Girl"	6 August 1963	Missing
123	7	"Pay as You Earn"	13 August 1963	Missing
124	8	"Expert with Salt"	20 August 1963	Incomplete
125	9	"Peggy"	27 August 1963	Incomplete
126	10	"Statement to the Press"	3 September 1963	Missing
127	11	"Scaremonger"	10 September 1963	Missing
128	12	"Deadline for Dummy"	17 September 1963	Missing
129	13	"Pillar to Post"	24 September 1963	Missing
130	14	"The Smoke Boys"	1 October 1963	Missing
131	15	"As Well as Murder"	8 October 1963	Missing
132	16	"Two Dreams in a Fire"	15 October 1963	Missing
133	17	"An Eye on the Kings"	22 October 1963	Missing
134	18	"Requiem on a Typewriter"	4 November 1963	Missing
135	19	"A Hole in the Head"	18 November 1963	Missing
136	20	"The Gamblers”	25 November 1963	Missing
137	21	"No Previous Convictions"	2 December 1963	Missing
138	22	"Always a Copper"	9 December 1963	Missing
139	23	"Death of Samantha"	16 December 1963	Missing
140	24	"Solomon Dancey's Luck"	23 December 1963	Missing
141	25	"Formula for Death"	30 December 1963	Missing
142	26	"A Car Is Stolen"	6 January 1964	Missing

== Series 6 (1964) ==
No. Overall	No In Series	Episode Title	Original Broadcast Date	Archive Status
143	1	"Play on Letters"	6 April 1964	Missing
144	2	"Who Takes the Blame?"	13 April 1964	Missing
145	3	"The By Boys"	20 April 1964	Missing
146	4	"My Father Is My Brother"	27 April 1964	Missing
147	5	"Line of Fire"	4 May 1964	Missing
148	6	"The Write-off"	11 February 1964	Missing
149	7	"An Eye for an Eye"	18 May 1964	Missing
150	8	"Red Roses for Emma"	25 May 1964	Missing
151	9	"Death of a Breadwinner"	1 June 1964	Missing
152	10	"Greeting from a 12-Bore"	8 June 1964	Missing
153	11	"It's Coming Down Harder"	22 June 1964	Missing
154	12	"Trained to Kill"	29 June 1964	Missing
155	13	"The Bleak Out"	6 July 1964	Missing
156	14	"The Rainbow Turned to Dust"	13 July 1964	Missing
157	15	"Varnish on Three Fingers"	20 July 1964	Missing
158	16	"The Carrion Bird"	27 July 1964	Missing
159	17	"The Hoarders"	3 August 1964	Missing
160	18	"Aftertaste"	10 August 1964	Missing
161	19	"The Things Money Can Buy"	17 August 1964	Missing
162	20	"One Redeeming Feature"	24 August 1964	Missing
163	21	"Hanging by a Thread"	31 August 1964	Missing
164	22	"The Point of Death"	14 September 1964	Missing
165	23	"Why Baker Died"	21 September 1964	Missing
166	24	"Real Class"	28 September 1964	Missing
167	25	"Rogue's Gallery"	5 October 1964	Missing
168	26	"Death of a Dead Man"	12 October 1964	Missing

== Series 7 (1965) ==
No. Overall	No In Series	Episode Title	Original Broadcast Date	Archive Status
169	1	"Whoever's Right, Sweeney's Wrong"	1 February 1965	Exists
170	2	"The Link"	8 February 1965	Missing
171	3	"A Menace to the Public"	15 February 1965	Missing
172	4	"Pom-Pom"	22 February 1965	Missing
173	5	"Bear with a Sore Hand"	1 March 1965	Missing
174	6	"Truth or Dare"	8 March 1965	Missing
175	7	"Blood and Water"	15 March 1965	Missing
176	8	"Found Dead"	22 March 1965	Missing
177	9	"The Grass"	29 March 1965	Missing
178	10	"The Bread Bag"	5 April 1965	Missing
179	11	"Death Out of Season"	12 April 1965	Missing
180	12	"Music for Murder"	19 April 1965	Exists
181	13	"To Find a Fox"	26 April 1965	Missing
182	14	"Smokey"	3 May 1965	Exists
183	15	"A Place in the Sun"	10 May 1965	Exists
184	16	"The Best Years of Your Life"	17 May 1965	Exists
185	17	"A Fistful of Trouble"	24 May 1965	Exists
186	18	"Calculated Risk"	31 May 1965	Missing
187	19	"Rat in a Trap"	7 June 1965	Exist
188	20	"Chain of Guilt"	14 June 1965	Exist
189	21	"A Cry for Help"	21 June 1965	Missing
190	22	"Wolves Get Eaten, Too"	28 June 1965	Missing
191	23	"One Good Man and Truce?"	5 July 1965	Exists
192	24	"The Reunion"	12 July 1965	Exists
193	25	"The Hunted and the Hunters"	19 July 1965	Missing
194	26	"The Lady on the Train"	26 July 1965	Missing

== Series 8 (1965–1966) ==
No. Overall	No In Series	Episode Title	Original Broadcast Date	Archive Status
195	1	"The Jelly Boy"	3 November 1965	Missing
196	2	"Hi-Jack"	10 November 1965	Missing
197	3	"Danger: Wrong Turning"	17 November 1965	Missing
198	4	"It Could Always Happen"	24 November 1965	Missing
199	5	"A Moment of Freedom"	1 December 1965	Missing
200	6	"The Street"	8 December 1965	Missing
201	7	"Run, Johnny, Run"	15 December 1965	Missing
202	8	"The Ring of Truth"	22 December 1965	Missing
203	9	"What's All This Then?"	29 December 1965	Missing
204	10	"Sing Me the Old Song"	5 January 1966	Missing
205	11	"The Lifer"	12 January 1966	Missing
206	12	"A Dead Cert"	19 January 1966	Missing
207	13	"The Fit-Up"	26 January 1966	Missing

== Series 9 (1966) ==
No. Overall	No In Series	Episode Title	Original Broadcast Date	Archive Status
208	1	"A Bottle Full of Sixpences"	4 May 1966	Missing
209	2	"Ask Me If I Killed Her"	11 May 1966	Exists
210	3	"The Old Pal's Act"	18 May 1966	Missing
211	4	"You Never Can Tell Till You Try"	25 May 1966	Missing
212	5	"Charlie Come Lately"	1 June 1966	Missing
213	6	"It Isn't Just the Money…"	8 June 1966	Missing
214	7	"The Night Walker"	15 June 1966	Missing
215	8	"The Smoker"	22 June 1966	Incomplete
216	9	"The Killing"	29 June 1966	Missing
217	10	"Golden Boy"	6 July 1966	Missing
218	11	"A Hero of Our Times"	13 July 1966	Missing
219	12	"Leo Did the Picking and It All Went Bad"	20 July 1966	Missing
220	13	"You Don't Think Twice"	27 July 1966	Missing

== Series 10 (1967) ==
No. Overall	No In Series	Episode Title	Original Broadcast Date	Archive Status
221	1	"It's All Happening"	15 March 1967	Exists
222	2	"The Game"	23 March 1967	Missing
223	3	"A Girl Like You"	30 March 1967	Missing
224	4	"The Price on My Head"	6 April 1967	Missing
225	5	"A Letter from Helga"	13 April 1967	Missing
226	6	"A Murder Is a Murder"	20 April 1967	Missing
227	7	"New Faces for Old"	27 April 1967	Missing
228	8	"Decree Absolute"	4 May 1967	Missing
229	9	"Gentle Persuasion"	11 May 1967	Missing
230	10	"A Through and Through with Powder"	18 May 1967	Missing
231	11	"Just Like the Old Days"	25 May 1967	Missing
232	12	"It Couldn't Be Charlie"	1 June 1967	Missing
233	13	"Who Is This Mortimer?"	8 June 1967	Missing
234	14	"Cause for Alarm"	15 June 1967	Missing
235	15	"Personal Feelings Don't Count"	22 June 1966	Missing

== Unknown (1966) ==
No. Overall	No In Series	Episode Title	Original Broadcast Date	Archive Status
236	1	"A Home Posting"	1966	Exists

== External Link ==
- List of No Hiding Place episodes at IMDb
