= Michael McStay =

English actor and writer (1933–2025)

- McStay as Sergeant Perryman in No Hiding Place (1964–1966)
- Born: Michael John McStay; 31 January 1933; West Ham, London, England
- Died: 11 May 2025 (aged 92); London, England
- Occupations: Actor; writer
- Years active: 1952–2011; 2023
- Spouse: Jennifer Clulow (m. 1967)
- Children: 2

Michael John McStay (//məkˈstaɪ//; 31 January 1933 – 11 May 2025), sometimes credited as Mike McStay, was an English actor and writer with a career spanning six decades. He was known for his roles in No Hiding Place, Coronation Street and Doctor Who.

== Biography ==
=== Early life ===
He was born Michael John McStay in West Ham, London, on 31 January 1933.

He studied drama, French, and philosophy at the University of Bristol where he also started acting on stage.

In the 1950s, he served for two years as an officer in Cyprus during the Cyprus Emergency.

=== Career ===
McStay began his acting career in the late 1950s, initially appearing in British film and television productions, often in uncredited or supporting roles. His early screen work included appearances in films such as The Day the Earth Caught Fire (1961) and Robbery (1967), as well as guest roles in series including Dixon of Dock Green and Z-Cars.

He gained wider recognition in the 1960s for his work in television drama, most notably portraying Detective Sergeant Perryman in 79 episodes of the ITV police series No Hiding Place between 1964 and 1966. During this period, he also appeared in programmes such as The Avengers, Crossroads and The Persuaders!.

He was reportedly considered for the role of James Bond after George Lazenby's departure from the franchise, though the part was ultimately returned to Sean Connery.

In 1976, McStay appeared in the BBC science fiction series Doctor Who, playing zoologist Derek Moberley in the serial The Seeds of Doom. He continued to work regularly in television throughout the 1970s and 1980s, with roles in productions including The Black Arrow, Fall of Eagles, A Perfect Spy and Juliet Bravo.

Alongside his acting career, McStay worked as a writer for television and radio, co-creating and writing the series Pull the Other One and contributing scripts to the radio series Coleman and Astor. In later years he also undertook narration and voice-over work for television and documentary projects.

McStay returned to screen acting intermittently in the 21st century, with appearances in series such as EastEnders and The Inspector Lynley Mysteries. In 2011, he replaced John Woodvine as Alan Hoyle in the ITV soap opera Coronation Street (Both men coincidentally died a few months apart in 2025). That was his final acting role.

In January 2023, he published a memoir, Inconsequential and Irrelevant: A Worm's Eye View of Acting, reflecting on his career in the entertainment industry. The following month he was interviewed by Toby Hadoke in his podcast Toby Hadoke's Time Travels.

== Personal life ==
He married actress Jennifer Clulow in 1967 and had two children with her, Darius and Paul. Darius is also an actor.

He died of heart failure in London on 11 May 2025, aged 92.

== Filmography ==
=== As actor ===
==== Film ====
Year	Title	Role	Notes
1961	Invasion Quartet	Doctor	Uncredited
1961	The Day the Earth Caught Fire	Policeman at Washing Centre	Uncredited
1962	Jigsaw	Police Operator	Uncredited
1964	Psyche 59	Man on Beach	
1964	The Curse of the Mummy's Tomb	Ra-Antef	Uncredited
1967	Robbery	Don	
1967	Battle Beneath the Earth	Train Commander	
1969	Mosquito Squadron	Flt Lt Mason	Uncredited
1971	Bread	Rafe Bates	Credited as Mike McStay
1971	Sound an Alarm	Himself / French Liaison Officer	Short
1974	Mission: Monte Carlo	Vernier	Archive footage
1977	The Stick Up	Mechanic	
1988	The Zero Option	Quentin Collins	
1995	Jack & Sarah	Security Man	
2005	The Grotlyn	N/A	Voice; short
2009	Centenary: The BP Story	Himself / Sir John Cadman	Voice; credited as Mike McStay

==== Television ====
Year	Title	Role	Notes
1960	Dixon of Dock Green	PC Wyman	Episodes: "Twinkle, Twinkle, Little Stars" and "The Threat"
1960	No Hiding Place	Sammy Fairburn	Episode: "A Very Respectable Man"
1961	Ghost Squad	Barman	Uncredited; episode: "The Eyes of the Bat"
1961	Playdate	Len Forrest	Episode: "The Exam"
1962	Richard the Lionheart	Knight	Episode: "The Great Enterprise"
1963	No Hiding Place	Willows	Episode: "Pillar to Post"
1964–1966	No Hiding Place	Det. Sgt. Perryman	79 episodes;
1968	The Avengers	Trancer	Episode: "Killer"
1969	Z Cars	Dennis Pickford	Episode: "Carbon Copy: Part 1"
1969	Crossroads	Steve Mitchell	11 episodes
1969	Who-Dun-It	Frank Gurney	Episode: "A High Class Death"
1971	Out of the Unknown	David	Episode: "The Last Witness"
1971	Paul Temple	Det. Insp. Keith Grant	Episode: "Death Sentence"
1971	The Persuaders!	Vernier	Episode: "The Gold Napoleon"
1971	Jason King	Gendarme	Episode: "Buried in the Cold Cold Ground"
1971	Trial	Oliver Gastrang	Episode: "Mister X"
1971	The Passenger	Andy Mason	3 episodes
1972	The Lotus Eaters	David Clive	Episode: "The Present Mrs Clive"
1972	My Wife Next Door	Ronald	Episode: "Anniversary Schmaltz"
1973–1974	The Black Arrow	Knoles	6 episodes
1974	Fall of Eagles	Count Montenuovo	Episode: "Indian Summer of an Emperor"
1974	The Double Dealers	Commentator	Episode: "Cut Down Like a Flower"
1975	Churchill's People	Ralf	Episode: "The Conquerors"
1975	Second Time Around	Arthur Anderson	Episode: "Take My Ex-Wife"
1975	The Sweeney	Eric - Nightclub manager	Episode: "Cover Story"
1976	Doctor Who	Derek Moberley	2 episodes; serial: The Seeds of Doom;
1977	Esther Waters	Bill Evans	Episode 4
1978	Tycoon	Martineau	Episode: "End to a Beginning"
1979	Park Ranger	Colin	Credited as Mike McStay; episodes: "New Boy", "Contest", "Waste", "Fire!"
1979	Shoestring	Croupier	Episode: "Stamp Duty"
1981	A Spy at Evening	Simons	Episode 2
1983	Juliet Bravo	Det Chief Inspector Bob Leeming	Episode: "Who's Your Friend?"
1983	This Is Your Life	Himself	Episode: "Johnny Briggs"
1985	Super Gran	Vincent Eleven	Episode: "Supergran and the Super Match"
1986	The Fourth Floor	Colin Ettrick	3-episode miniseries
1987	Screen Two	Donald MacLean	Episode: "Blunt"
1987	Home James!	Markham	Episode: "Things That Go Spoof in the Night"
1987	Bureaucracy of Love	Vicar	TV film
1987	Sunday Premiere	Middle-aged Hack	Episode: "Love After Lunch"
1987	Bust	Sir Alec	Episode: "Man of Property"
1987	A Perfect Spy	Belinda's father	Episode 4
1988	ScreenPlay	Mr de Ville	Episode: "Starlings"
1989	Dispatches	Himself	Narrator; episode: "Return to Year Zero?"
1990	Le mari de l'ambassadeur	Jimmy Harper	Episode 1
1990	French Fields	The auctioneer	Episode: "Double or Quit"
1991	Thatcher: The Final Days	Michael Mates	TV film
1991	Sherlock Holmes and the Leading Lady	Inspector Schmidt	TV film
1992	The Bill	Keith Prentice	Episode: "Illegals"
1996	The Bill	Ch. Insp. Cochrane	Episode: "Don't Kill the Messenger"
2000	EastEnders	Maurice	Episode 2042
2001	Mike Baldwin & Me	Himself	TV film
2002	Ted and Alice	James Lowe	3-episode miniseries
2005	Hiroshima	Morio Ozaki	Voice-over; credited as Mike McStay; Documentary TV film
2006	The Inspector Lynley Mysteries	Will McRae	Episode: "One Guilty Deed"
2010	Doctor Who: The Seeds of Doom	Himself	DVD commentary
2011	Coronation Street	Alan Hoyle	17 episodes;

==== Audio ====
Year	Title	Role	Notes
1981	The Lord of the Rings	Rohan	The Two Towers; radio play
1990, 1992–1994	Coleman and Astor	N/A	Reader; 7 radio plays;
2023	Toby Hadoke's Time Travels	Himself	Podcast interview; episode: "Happy Times and Places";

==== Theatre ====
Year	Title	Role	Venue
1952–1953	Summer and Smoke		Drama Department, University of Bristol
1954–1955	A Streetcar Named Desire		Drama Department, University of Bristol
1954–1955	Down in the Valley		Drama Department, University of Bristol
1955–1956	Measure for Measure		Dartington Hall, Devon
1955–1956	The Flies		Drama Department, University of Bristol
1955–1956	Gammer Gurton's Needle		Drama Department, University of Bristol
1955–1956	Electra		Drama Department, University of Bristol
1956–1957	Measure for Measure		Drama Department, University of Bristol
3–8 June 1963	Bogey 7	Lew Telliger	Brighton Hippodrome
10–15 June 1963	Bogey 7	Lew Telliger	Bristol Hippodrome

=== As writer ===
==== Television ====
Year	Title	Notes
1984	Pull the Other One	6 episodes

==== Radio ====
Year	Title	Notes
1990, 1992–1994	Coleman and Astor	7 radio plays;
1999	The Hand of Dartmoor	Based on the legend of Hairy Hands

== Bibliography ==
Year	Title	ISBN	Notes
2023	Inconsequential and Irrelevant: A Worm's Eye View of Acting	ISBN 978-1-911537-21-2	Memoir
