= The Loop, River Dart =

Section of the River Dart, Dartmoor, England

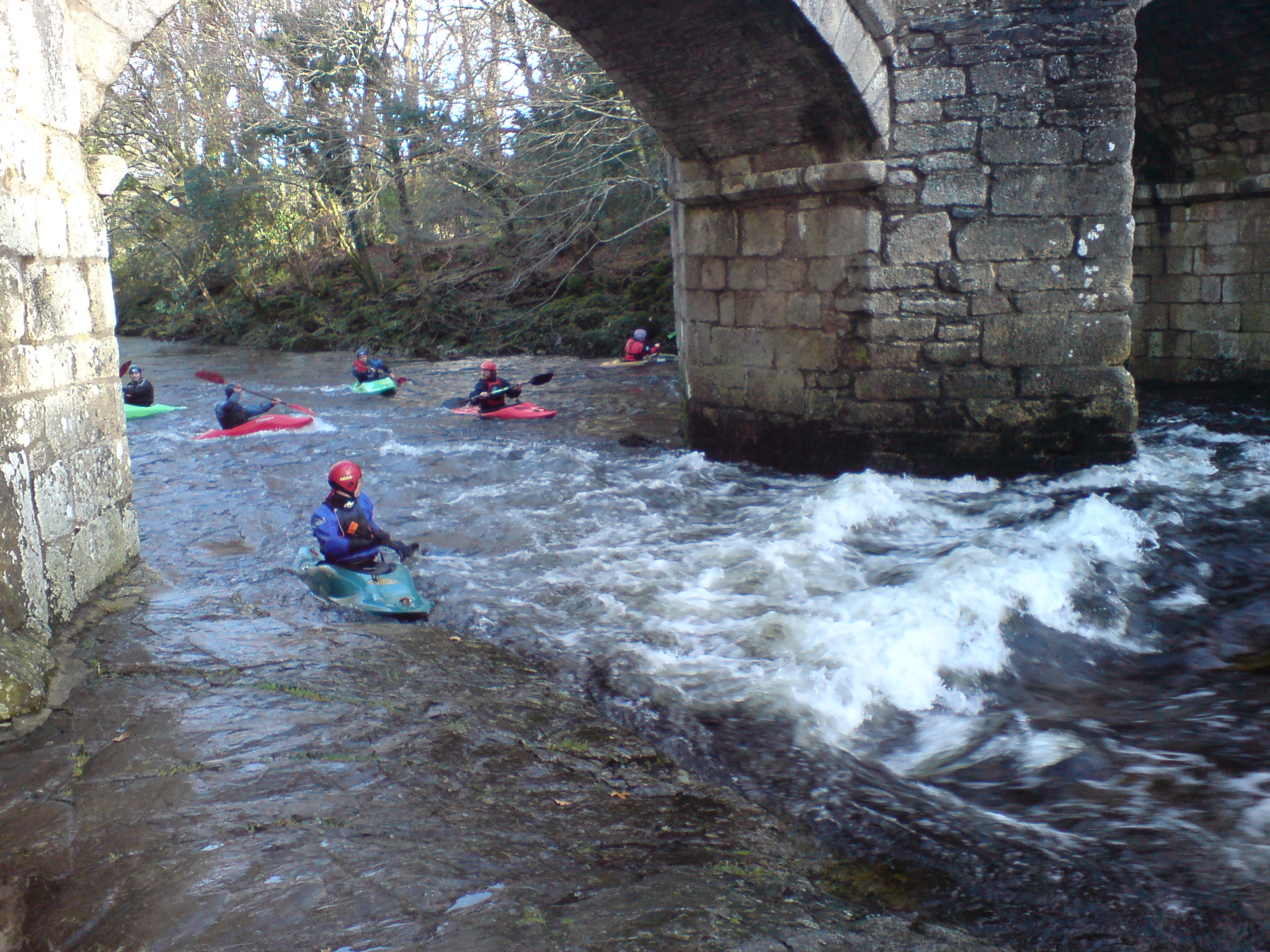
Kayakers playing on a wave under Newbridge

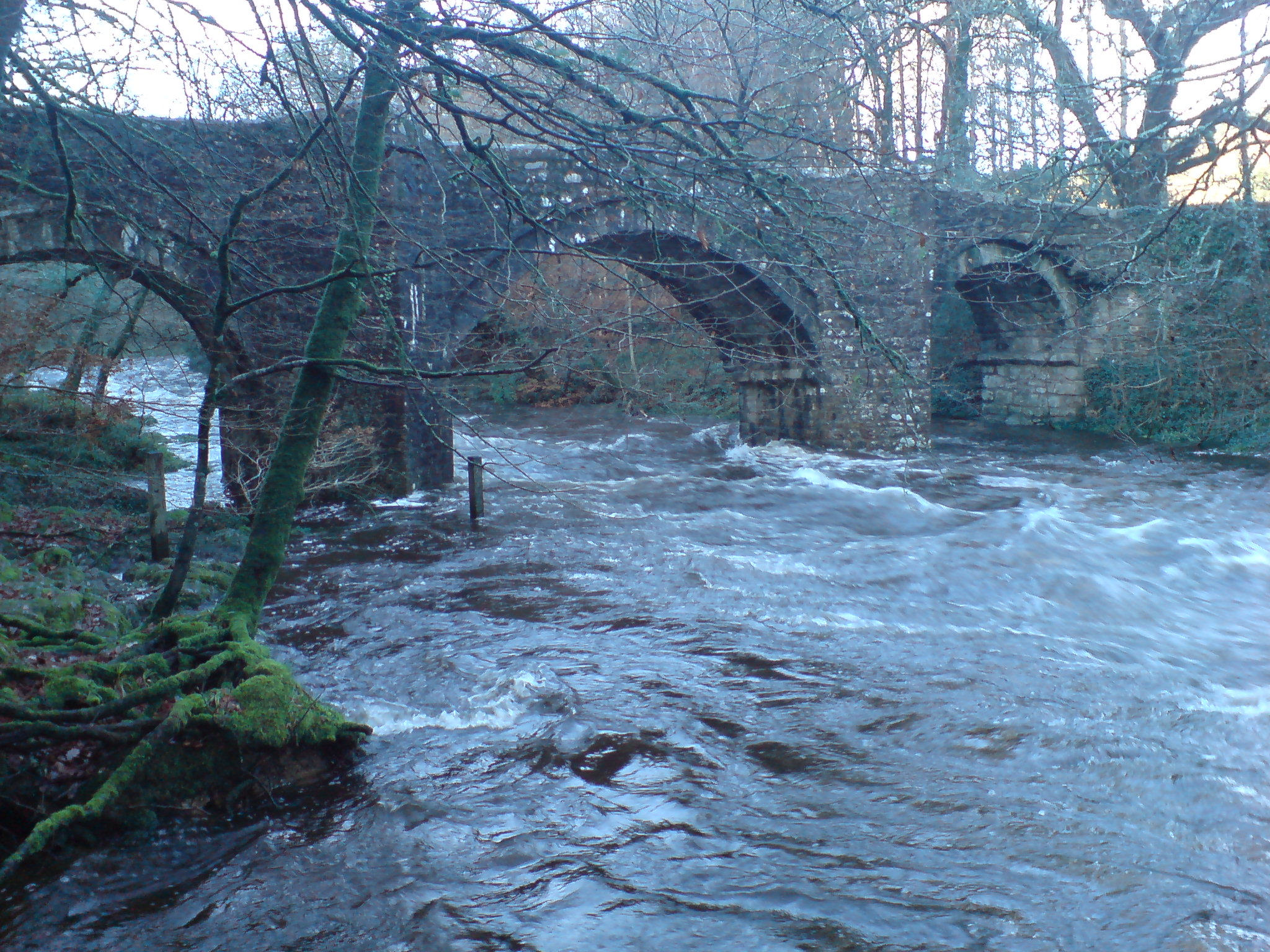
Holne Bridge, in high water

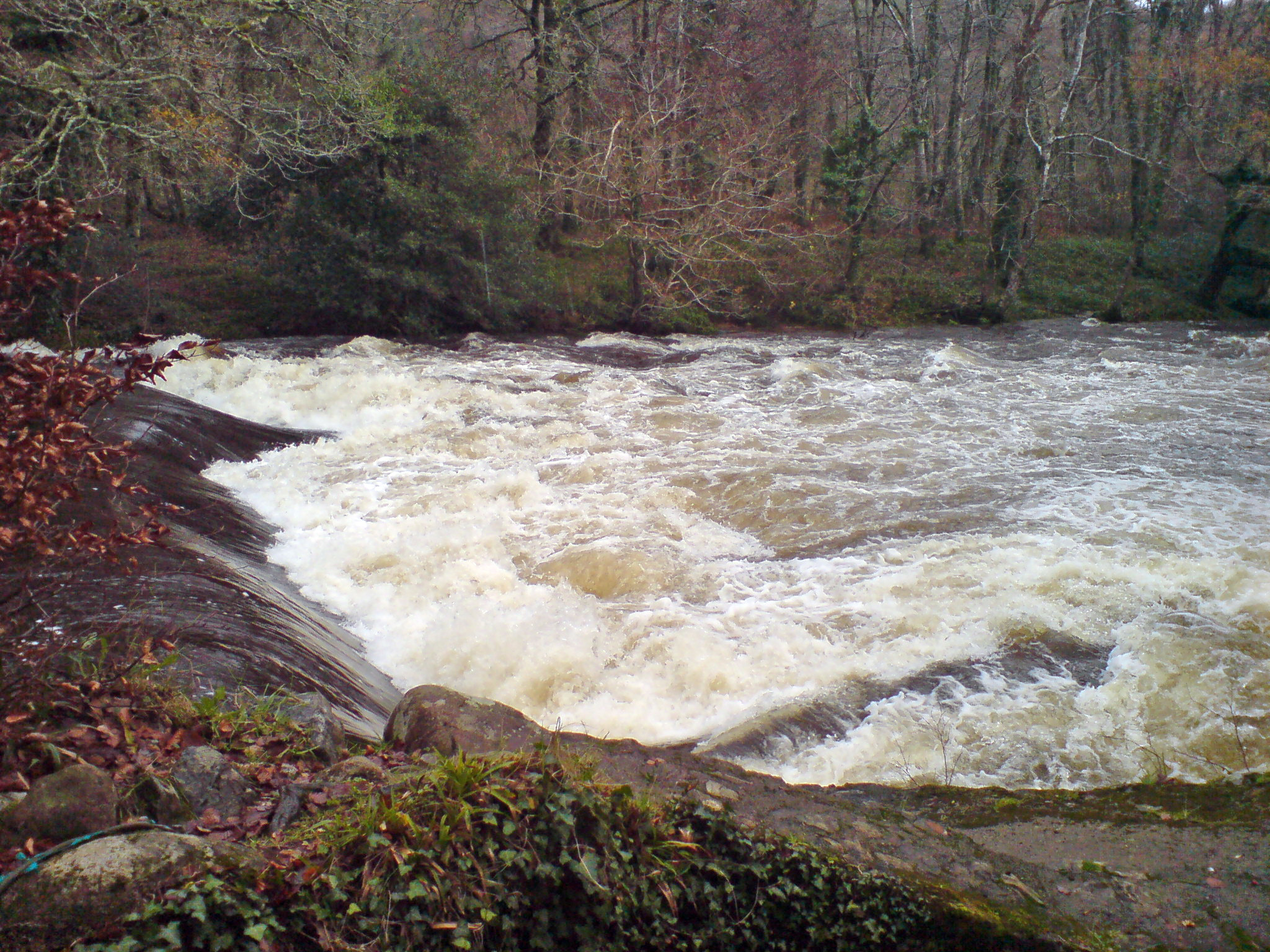
Holne Weir

The Loop is a section of the River Dart, Dartmoor, also known as the Dart Loop.

It is perhaps the most popular section of whitewater for kayakers and canoeists in England. This section is preceded by the Upper Dart, and followed by The Lower.

== Overview ==
The Loop is named as such because of the shape of its meander, much like a loop of string.

This section's length is approximately 3 miles (4.8 kilometres), but to drive by car from start to finish is only 1.3 miles (2.1 kilometres) because of river and road geography.

This section is graded at 2, with three rapids rated at grade 3. In very high water, some of the grade 2 sections will become continuous and push towards grade 3.

== Whitewater rapids ==
=== List of rapids ===
Most of the rapids have been named by watersports enthusiasts, and are officially referred to in guidebooks, such as English White Water: The British Canoe Union Guidebook.

In order of each rapid, they are:

==== Newbridge rapid ====
The first rapid is Newbridge itself, a small wave formed before the bridge which can be played on at low-medium levels, washes out at high levels.

==== Top Wave ====
About 50 metres from Newbridge is a river-wide wave, which gets better with more water flowing over it. Top Wave is very popular with playboaters with eddy service on both sides and a bank side walk back to the car park.

Many grade I to II rapids follow. The river splits, with a gauge on the island, where after the River Webburn joins the Dart. Here, a seam between the two river currents forms allowing squirtboaters to practise their sport.

==== Washing Machine ====
A one-meter grade III drop, with a stopper and wave train beneath it.

In high to very high levels the stopper is quite formidable for novices hence the name "Washing Machine". Low to medium levels require little effort to pass through.

More rapids follow, along with seal-launch rock, a tall sloping rock which can be slid down.

==== Lover's Leap ====
This involves a 100-meter grade III rapid which requires rock evasion and a final wave train which pushes one into the leap itself; a large undercut cliff-face. In anything but high flows the leap is easily avoided but has the potential to pin inexperienced paddlers.

Several wide and continuous rapids follow Lover's Leap. However, just before the next grade III rapid, a small but sticky stopper appears without warning. This needs to be taken mid-river or one could end up being back-looped, and going over Triple-drop in an awkward position.

==== Triple-drop / Triple-falls ====
The most difficult grade III rapid on this section of the Dart. Inspection and portage are available on both sides of the river.

- First drop is a half metre ledge. A pour-over type hole in low levels.
- Second drop is a big wave/stopper into a pool.
- Thirds drop is harder where the centre line should be taken followed by a move to the left or right. This avoids the centre which turns into a sticky stopper at most levels.

Each drop has small eddies on both sides of the river. The pool after the third drop is flat allowing boats and people to be rescued at the river bank.

More grade I/II rapids follow before one reaches the Spindryer.

==== Spindryer ====
At high levels, this rapid can be harder, especially if taken on river right, leaving the individual in the fast-rotating eddy the rapid is named after. If caught, a fast break-in is needed and possibly a surf across the wave that forms next to it. River left is the ideal place to aim for.

More small rapids follow.

==== Haystack rapids ====
The last notable rapid on the river before Holne Bridge. Its reasonably large but predictable breaking waves carry 50–80 metres down to Holne Bridge.

==== Holne Bridge: and lower take outs ====
There is no longer a take out facility at Holne Bridge. Continue down and take out river left above the weir (where there is not really any lay-by facility on the road: temporary stopping might be tolerated) or continue to the next bridge downstream. This carries the road at the entrance to the Country Park. Get out on river right above the bridge. Temporary parking at egress point is possible, but (October 2013) is restricted. The main car park is several hundred metres up the hill. This bridge is frequently called "Waterworks Bridge". This is very confusing since below Buckfastleigh there is a large waterworks on river right, a bridge, and a good egress point immediately below the bridge on river left. This is very close to the main road on which traffic moves very fast. Stopping in short lane (room for two cars) between the road and river is possible, but parking there is not advisable.

The Riverdart Country Park charges (pay and display) during the paddling season £5 per car or £10 per minibus for the day. Parking is free after 4 pm for visitors wanting to use the bar and restaurant. Day visitors also have use of the toilet facilities and communal hot showers on Saturdays and Sundays. The Old Sawmill is open at weekends and offers a Sunday Carvery lunch from noon to 3 pm.

A feasible, though fairly long, alternative is to continue down the river to Buckfastleigh where in the winter there is ample parking. This section, the Lower Dart or just "Lower" is grade 2 with some flat sections.

==== Holne weir ====
In medium to high levels this is a highly retentive stopper and should be treated with caution. Two chutes allow access through, and should not be missed. The lead-in is flat, and is easy to achieve. Portage on the bank is also possible.

Another small rapid follows, with the Anvil; a rententive playspot.
