= Hairy Hands =

Legend in the English county of Devon

The Hairy Hands is a ghost story/legend that built up about a stretch of road on a remote area of Dartmoor in the English county of Devon, which was purported to have seen an unusually high number of motor vehicle accidents during the early 20th century.

== Location ==
The legend of the Hairy Hands is set near Postbridge, Dartmoor. The road is now known as the B3212.

According to the story, the Hairy Hands are a pair of disembodied hands that appear suddenly, grab at the steering wheel of a moving car or the handlebars of a motorcycle, and then force the victim's vehicle off the road. In some cases, the hands are described as being invisible.

== Incidents ==
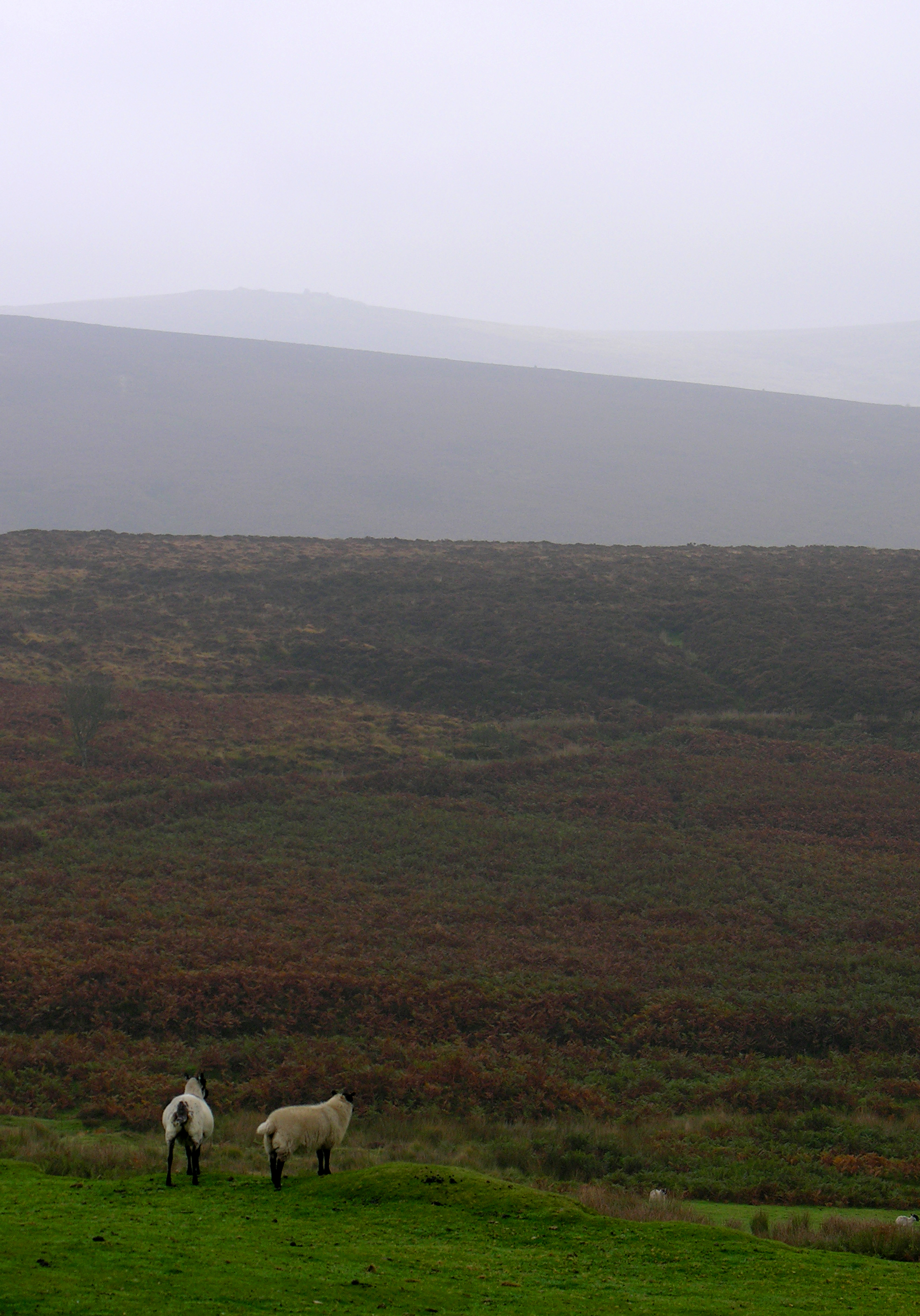
The bleakness of Dartmoor has encouraged the growth of many legends.

Since around 1910, drivers and cyclists have reported suffering unusual accidents along the road between Postbridge and Two Bridges. In many cases, the victims reported that their vehicle had jolted or swerved violently and steered off the side of the road, as if something had taken hold of the wheels and wrenched it out of their control.

In most instances, the victims ran into a verge and survived. Their experiences remained a local curiosity, until June 1921, when E.H. Helby, the medical officer for Dartmoor Prison, was killed when he lost control of his motorcycle combination. Two young girls, children of the prison governor, who had been riding in the sidecar, survived. Several weeks after Helby's death, there was another incident in which a coach driver lost control, injuring several passengers who were thrown out of their seats. Then, on 26 August 1921, an army captain reported that a pair of invisible hands had taken hold of him and forced his motorcycle off the road, after which the story was picked up by newspapers in London and became known nationwide.

In Supernatural Dartmoor by Michael Williams, there is a story told by journalist and author Rufus Endle. He claimed that, while driving near Postbridge on an unstated date, "a pair of hands gripped the driving wheel and I had to fight for control." He managed to avoid a crash and the hands disappeared as inexplicably as they had come. He requested that Williams not publish the story until after his death, for fear of ridicule.

Not all reported incidents occurred in moving vehicles. In one incident, in 1924, a woman camping on the moor with her husband reported seeing a hairy hand attempting to gain access to her caravan during the night. She reported that the hand retreated after she made the sign of the Cross.

== Explanations ==
Most variations of the legend of the Hairy Hands do not specify the origins of the hands or attribute to them any specific purpose, other than driving motorists off the road. A few local versions of the story attribute the hands to an unnamed man who died in an accident on the road.

According to local sceptics, most of the accidents were caused by people who were unfamiliar with the area driving too fast down narrow country roads with high walled sides, resulting in them either losing control or misjudging the road and running off its edges. After the story appeared in the national press, several investigations were carried out into the road. It was eventually determined that the accidents were most likely due to the camber of the road's surface, which reached dangerous levels in places and was duly altered.

== In the media ==
The legend was linked to witchcraft in the short play 'The Hairy Hand of Dartmoor' by Michael McStay, broadcast on BBC Radio 4 on 8 February 1999.

The Hairy Hands were mentioned by Josh Widdicombe on "Monster Mash", an episode in Series M of panel show QI. Widdicombe again mentioned the story on series 2 episode 2 of comedy panel show Hypothetical, hosted with James Acaster, and on the 19 April 2019 episode of Have I Got a Bit More News for You and again on 28 February 2020 episode of The Last Leg.
