= Holne Bridge =

Medieval bridge over the River Dart, Devon, England

Coordinates: 50.5212°N 3.7927°W

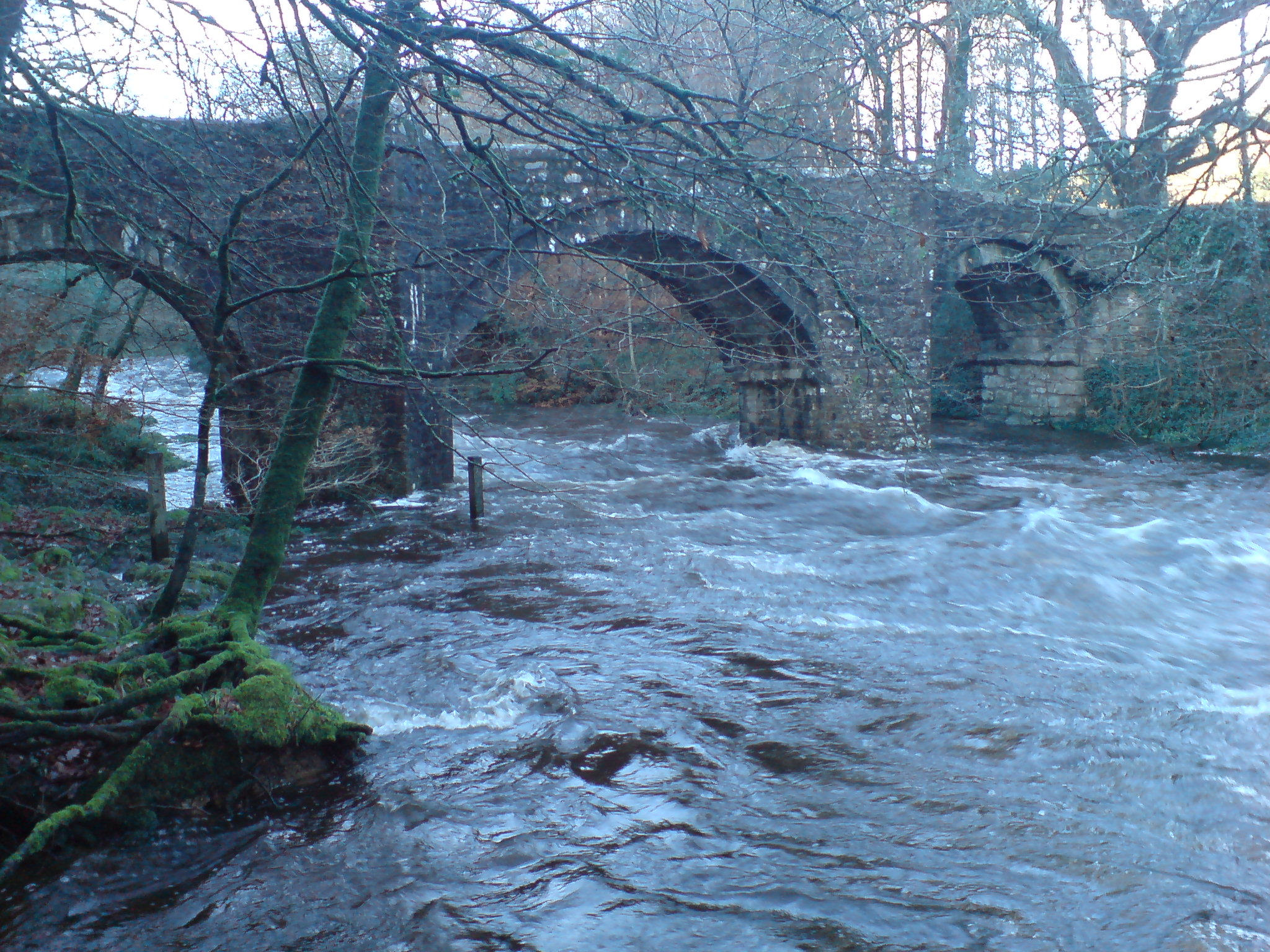
Holne Bridge, at high water

Holne Bridge is a Grade II* listed medieval bridge over the River Dart, Dartmoor, Devon, England. It is on the road between Ashburton and Two Bridges, about 1.5 miles or 2.5 km from Ashburton, and connects Holne Chase to Ausewell. The narrowness of both this bridge and nearby New Bridge means that the length and width of vehicles on this road are restricted.

The bridge is constructed of local granite and has four arches, three of which are semicircular, the other segmental. It was rebuilt in 1413, at the same time as the building of the nearby New Bridge. The two central pillars have cutwaters on both sides; on the north side of the bridge these extend up to road level and provide triangular refuges for pedestrians.

== Whitewater ==
Holne Bridge is an official BCU access and egress point for kayakers and canoeists.

This point marks the end of The Loop section and beginning of The Lower section.
