= No Hiding Place =

British TV drama series (1959–1967)

- 1967 TVTimes cover: Raymond Francis & Sean Caffrey
- Starring: Raymond Francis; Eric Lander; Johnny Briggs; Michael McStay; Julian Fox; Sean Caffrey; Gerald Taylor; Barry Raymond; Derek Benfield
- Country of origin: United Kingdom
- No. of series: 10
- No. of episodes: 236 (194 missing, 12 incomplete) (list of episodes)

Production
- Running time: 60 minutes
- Production company: Associated-Rediffusion

Original release
- Network: ITV
- Release: 16 September 1959 – 22 June 1967

No Hiding Place is a British television series that was produced at Wembley Studios by Associated-Rediffusion for the ITV network between 16 September 1959 and 22 June 1967.

It was the sequel to the series Murder Bag (1957–1958) and Crime Sheet (1959), all starring Raymond Francis as Detective Superintendent, later Detective Chief Superintendent Tom Lockhart.

== Production ==
Murder Bag comprised 55 half-hour episodes: 30 in Season One (16 September 1957 – 31 March 1958), all untitled (being identified only by case number, as "Murder Bag – Case One", etc); and 25 in Season Two (30 June 1958 – 1 April 1959), all titled, and featuring the word "Lockhart" as the first word of their title. Murder Bag was created by Glyn Davies, produced by Barry Baker and written by Barry Baker and Peter Ling. Backup sergeants and others changed regularly. The murder bag in the title carried 42 items which were needed in the investigation of a crime. The show was produced live in the studio. According to IMDb there were 29 episodes in series one and 40 in series two.

In Crime Sheet, Lockhart had now been promoted to Detective Chief Superintendent. The writers of the series revealed to the TV Times in 1962 that Lockhart could not be promoted above this rank, as he would no longer be expected to visit the crime scene, thus hindering the potential of the storylines. 17 episodes (23 episodes according to IMDb) of 30 minutes were produced from 8 April 1959 to 9 September 1959. Due to Raymond Francis contracting mumps, the final episode of Crime Sheet did not feature Lockhart but Chief Superintendent Carr, played by Gerald Case.

No Hiding Place continued to follow the cases of Detective Chief Superintendent Tom Lockhart at Scotland Yard, with a new longer one-hour format allowing for more story and character development. He was initially assisted by Detective Sergeant later Inspector Harry Baxter (Eric Lander), followed by Det. Sgt. Russell (Johnny Briggs) and Det. Sgt. Perryman (Michael McStay), and finally by Det. Sgt. Gregg (Sean Caffrey).

Crossover episode - One 1962 episode, broadcast on 25 September, series 4, episode 21, The Most Beautiful Room in the World, saw a guest appearance of Patrick Cargill in the guise of the character Miquel Garetta from the series Top Secret.

Still largely studio-based, the series now included more pre-filmed sequences. A decision was made to cancel the series in 1965, but there were so many protests from the public and the police that it returned for another two years. 236 episodes were made in total.

Detective Sergeant Harry Baxter was there from episode one until episode 141. Midway through the series he was transferred to E Division's Q Car Squad and promoted from Sergeant to Inspector, a rank he retained when he returned to the Yard in 1963. Baxter had his own short TV series, Echo Four-Two. Unfortunately the show suffered from poor scripts and of 13 planned episodes, only 10 were made (30 minutes each, 24 August 1961 to 25 October 1961), interrupted by an actor's strike, and no more were made.

The No Hiding Place theme music, was performed by Ken Mackintosh and his orchestra, entered the charts in 1960.

== Cast ==
=== Main cast ===
Actor	Role
Raymond Francis	Tom Lockhart
Eric Lander	Harry Baxter
Johnny Briggs	Sergeant Russell
Michael McStay	Sergeant Perryman
Julian Fox	Constable
Sean Caffrey	Sergeant Gregg
Gerald Turner	1st Clerk, Fingerprint man, Sgt. Harris
Barry Raymond	River PC, Det. Sgt. Rigby, Police Constable, Det. Sgt. Bowman, Sgt. Bowman
Derek Benfield	George Cooper

=== Guests ===
- Bryan Marshall as Stewart (1 episode)
- Gwen Nelson
- John Meillon as Phil Hayward / Leslie Mason (2 episodes)
- Ken Wayne as Henderson (1 episode)
- Reg Lye as Fred Conner / Jake / Tug Wilson / Mortimer Bilk (4 episodes)
- Richard Meikle as Arthur Wolf (1 episode)

== Missing episodes ==
Murder Bag and Crime Sheet are considered lost television series; according to www.lostshows.com, no complete episodes of the former exist, and only one survives of the latter. However, one episode of Murder Bag (retitled Mystery Bag), "Lockhart Finds a Note", was found in the form of a film telerecording from Australia, and included on Network's ITV 60 compilation box set. The longer-running No Hiding Place fared marginally better than its predecessors, although only 30 of the 236 episodes produced exist in full with 12 more existing incomplete. This figure includes episodes known to be held by the National Film and Television Archive and those held in private collections. Some early episodes were broadcast live and were not recorded.

The surviving episodes are as follows:

=== Series 1 ===
- Episode 1: The Talking Doll (16 September 1959)
- Episode 17: Victim of the Dark (6 January 1960)

=== Series 2 ===
- Episode 5: Two Blind Mice (2 June 1960)

=== Series 3 ===
- Episode 6: The Widower (10 March 1961)
- Episode 7: Whistle and I’ll Come (17 March 1961)
- Episode 12: Told by a Dead Man (28 April 1961)
- Episode 23: The White Stick (14 July 1961)
- Episode 26: Dead Ringer (4 August 1961)

=== Series 4 ===
- Episode 2: Accessories After the Fact (15 March 1962)
- Episode 12: Inquest on an Idol (24 July 1962)
- Episode 27: Contents Noted (13 November 1962)
- Episode 32: The Front Man (18 December 1962)
- Episode 34: Death on the Doorstep (1 January 1963)
- Episode 37: Beware of the Weepers (22 January 1963)
- Episode 38: A Pocketful of Bones (29 January 1963)
- Episode 40: Operation Tiptoe (12 February 1963)
- Episode 44: A Bird to Watch the Marbles (19 March 1963)

=== Series 7 ===
- Episode 1: Whoever’s Right, Sweeney’s Wrong (1 February 1965)
- Episode 12: Music for Murder (19 April 1965)
- Episode 14: Smokey (3 May 1965)
- Episode 15: A Place in the Sun (10 May 1965)
- Episode 16: The Best Years of Your Life (17 May 1965)
- Episode 17: A Fistful of Trouble (24 May 1965)
- Episode 19: Rat in a Trap (7 June 1965)
- Episode 20: Chain of Guilt (14 June 1965)
- Episode 23: One Good Man and True? (5 July 1965)
- Episode 24: The Reunion (12 July 1965)

=== Series 9 ===
- Episode 2: Ask Me If I Killed Her (9 May 1966)

=== Series 10 ===
- Episode 1: It’s All Happening (13 March 1967)

=== Unknown ===
- A Home Posting (1966)

== Sources ==
- Evans, Jeff (2001). The Penguin TV Companion. Penguin. ISBN 0-14-051467-8.
