= Newbridge, River Dart =

Bridge over the River Dart in Devon, England

Coordinates: 50.5235°N 3.8191°W

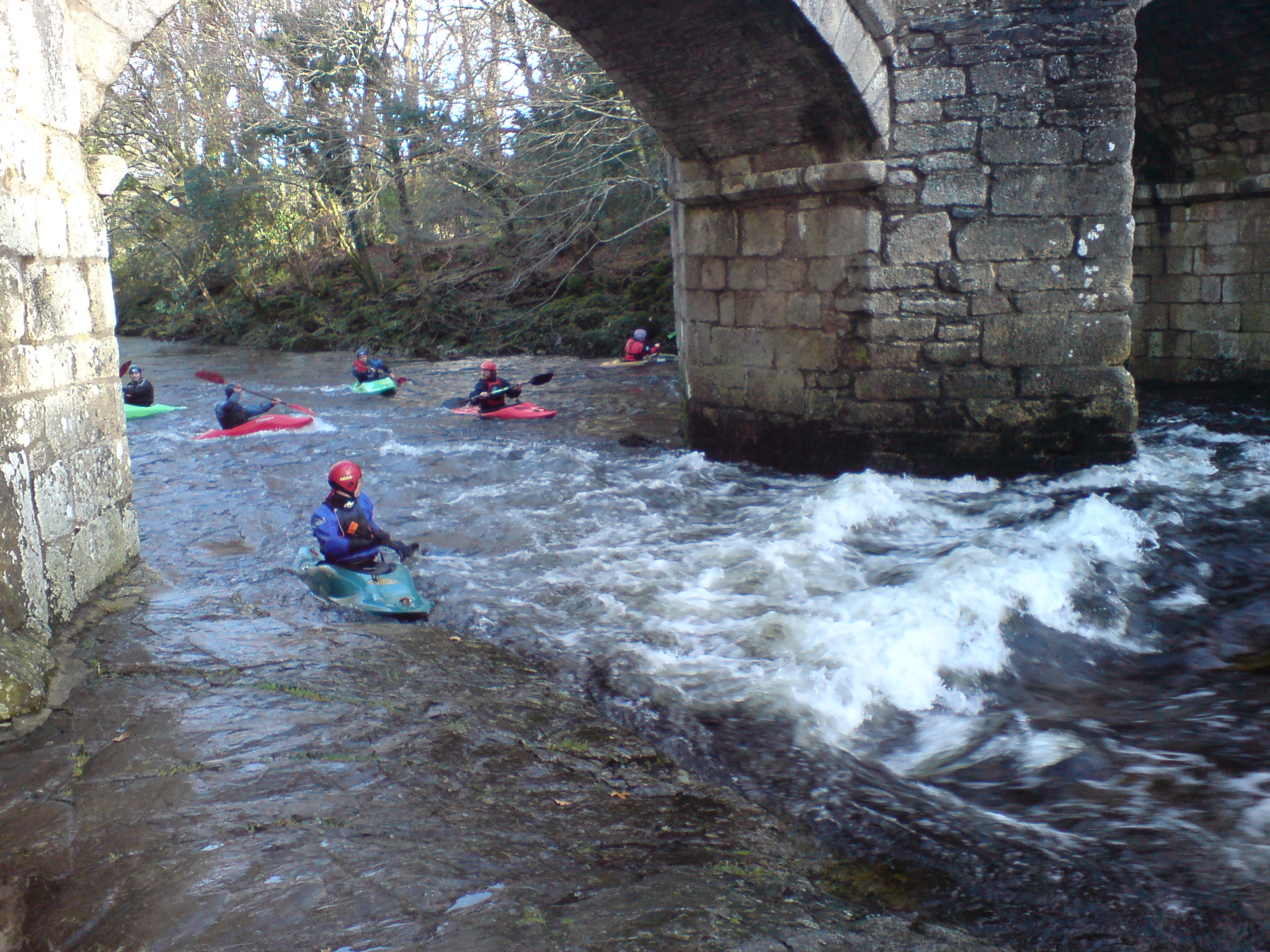
Kayakers playing on a wave which forms under Newbridge

Newbridge or New Bridge is a Grade II* listed medieval bridge over the River Dart, Dartmoor, Devon, England.

It is on the road between Ashburton and Two Bridges, and connects Aish Tor to Holne Chase. A car park is located next to the bridge and is often frequented by families, walkers, and watersports enthusiasts, though the narrowness of both this bridge and Holne Bridge means that the size of vehicles is restricted on this road.

The bridge is constructed of local granite and has three semicircular arches, one smaller than the others. It was built in 1413, at the same time as the nearby Holne Bridge was reconstructed. The two pillars have cutwaters to deflect the flow of water; these extend up to road level and provide triangular refuges for pedestrians.

== Whitewater ==
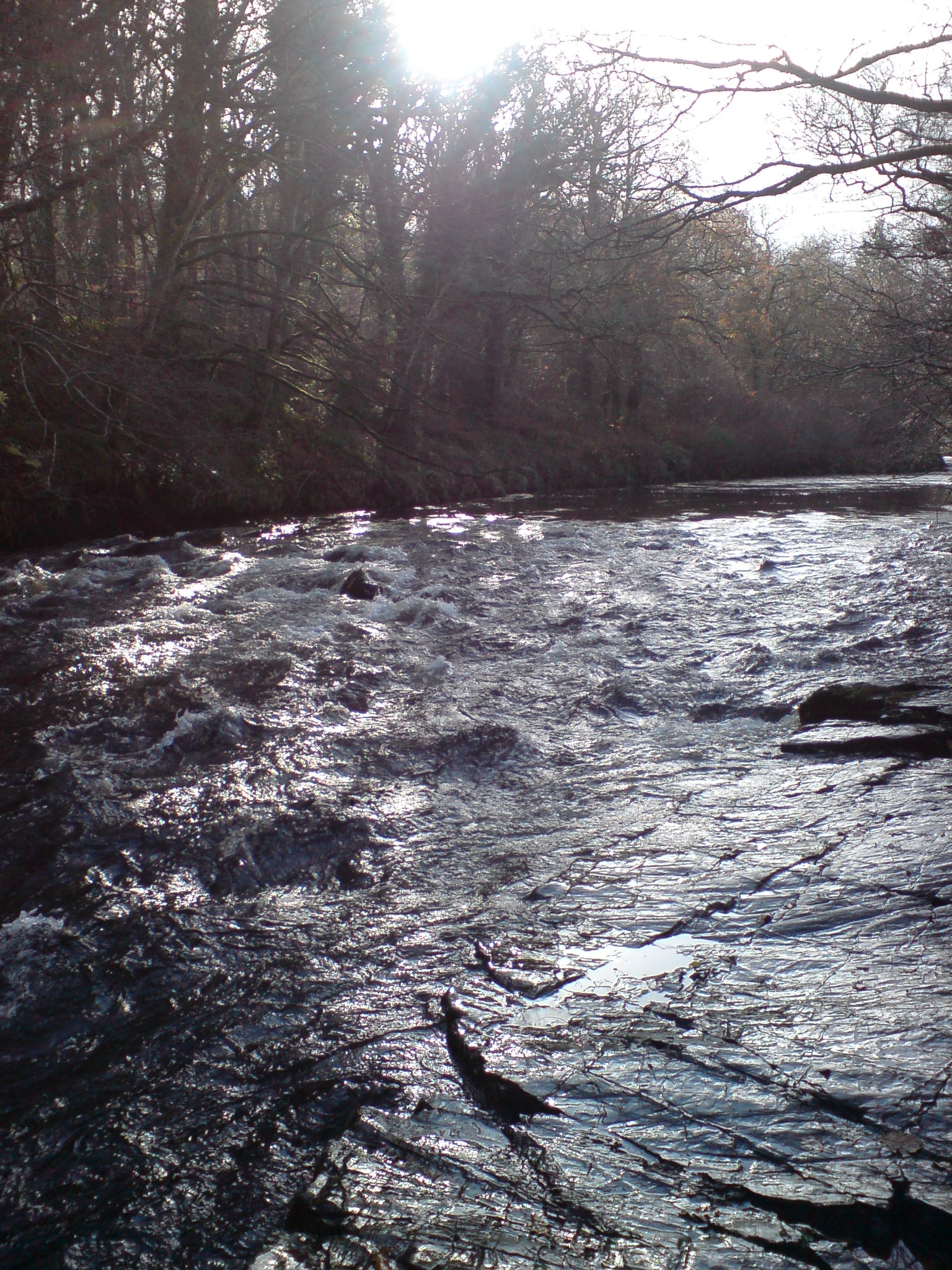
'The Slab' rock ledge

Newbridge is a recognised British Canoe Union access and egress point for kayakers and canoeists. The creation of bank reinforcements and steps leading down to the river have been overseen by the BCU. The bridge marks the end of The Upper section and beginning of The Loop. A nearby rock ledge, known as "The Slab" is used as a visual guide to the river level.
