= East Dart River =

Tributary of the River Dart in Devon, England

East Dart
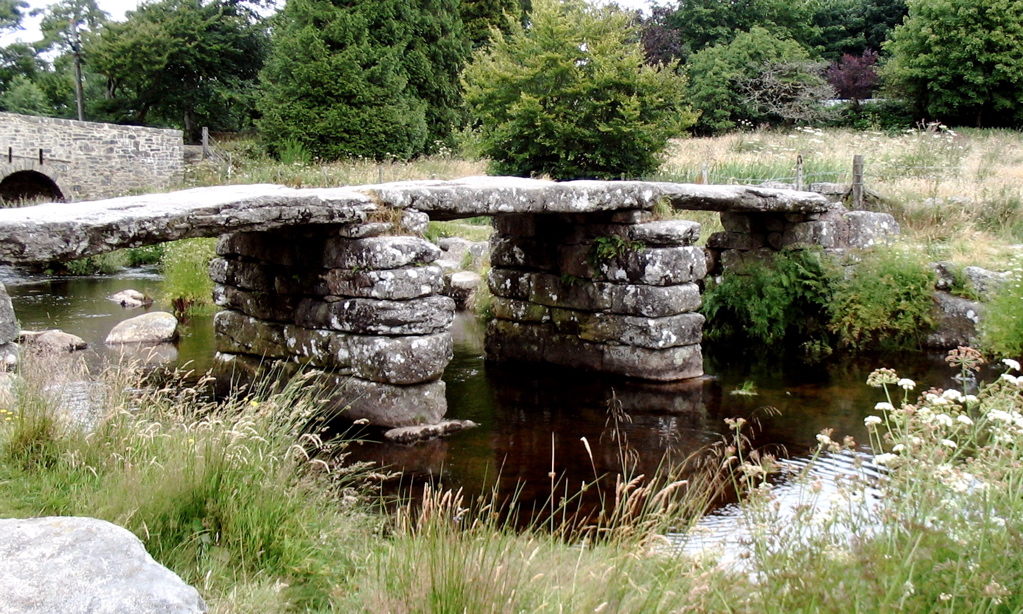
- The clapper bridge crossing of the East Dart, at Postbridge

Location
- Country: England
- County: Devon

Physical characteristics
- Source
  - location: Kit Rock, Whinney's Down
  - elevation: 510 m (1,670 ft)
- Mouth: Dartmeet
  - coordinates: 50.5428°N 3.8756°W
  - elevation: 210 m (690 ft)
- Length: 16.3 km (10.1 mi)

The East Dart River is one of the two main tributaries of the River Dart in Devon, England.

Its source is to the west of Whitehorse Hill and slightly south of Cranmere Pool on Dartmoor. It flows south and then south-west for around 9 km to reach the village of Postbridge where it is spanned by a well-known clapper bridge.

Before reaching Postbridge the river swings to the east, and then to north-east, flowing between clitter (boulder) strewn steep slopes before once again flowing south.

Just above Postbridge the river drops around 2 metres in a short distance and the point is referred to as "Waterfall".

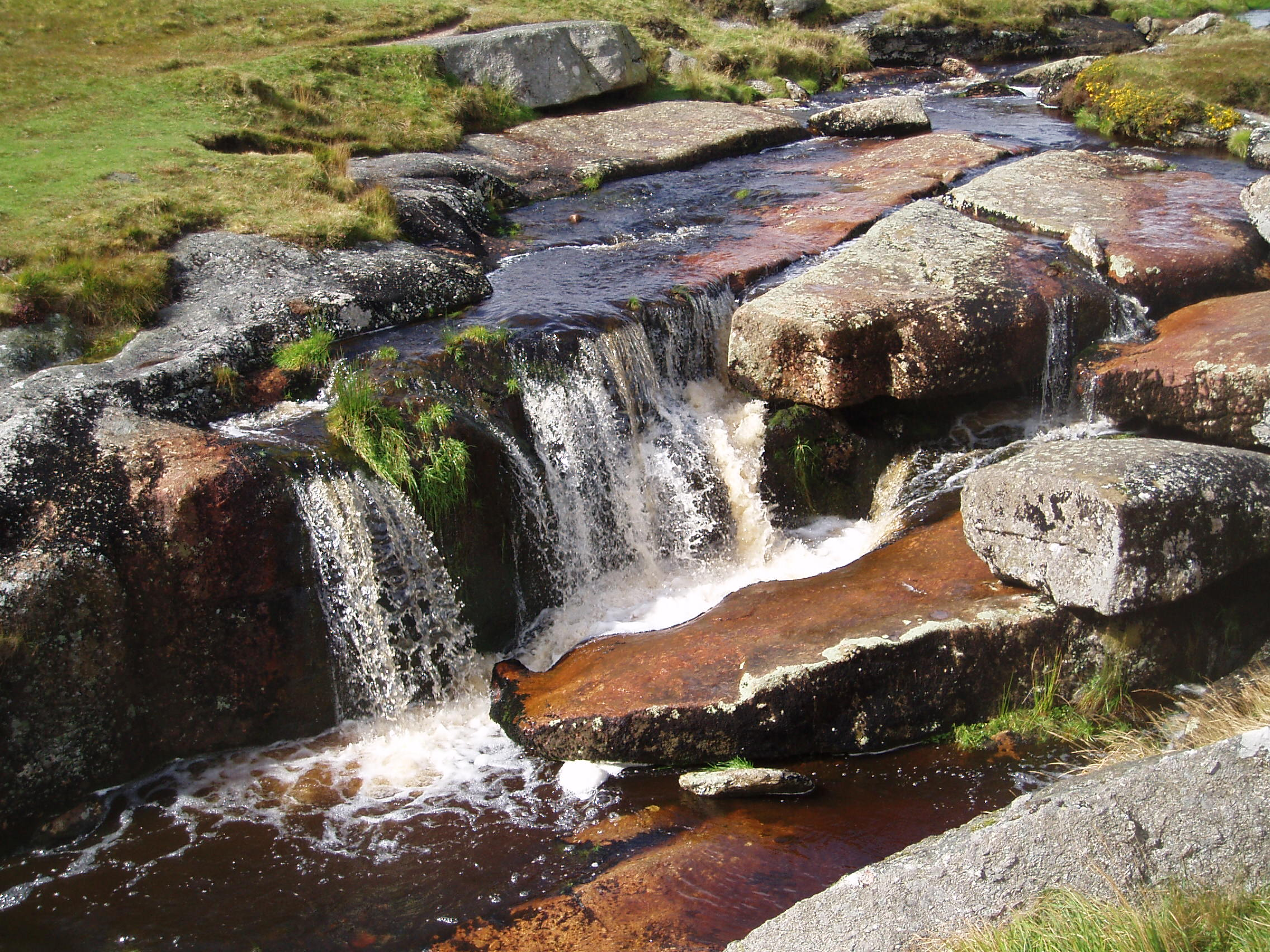
The "Waterfall" on the East Dart.

It continues south past Bellever to Dartmeet where it joins the West Dart.
