= Des Moines Township =

Des Moines Township may refer to:

== Iowa ==
- Des Moines Township, Boone County, Iowa
- Des Moines Township, Dallas County, Iowa
- Des Moines Township, Jasper County, Iowa
- Des Moines Township, Jefferson County, Iowa
- Des Moines Township, Lee County, Iowa
- Des Moines Township, Pocahontas County, Iowa
- Des Moines Township, Polk County, Iowa
- Des Moines Township, Van Buren County, Iowa

== Minnesota ==
- Des Moines Township, Minnesota

== Missouri ==
- Des Moines Township, Clark County, Missouri
