= Des Moines (disambiguation) =

Des Moines is the capital of the state of Iowa in the United States.

Des Moines may also refer to:

== Places ==
- Des Moines metropolitan area, the metropolitan area for Des Moines, Iowa
- Des Moines River
- Des Moines County, Iowa
- Des Moines, Washington
- Des Moines, New Mexico
- Des Moines Township, Boone County, Iowa
- Des Moines Township, Dallas County, Iowa
- Des Moines Township, Jasper County, Iowa
- Des Moines Township, Jefferson County, Iowa
- Des Moines Township, Lee County, Iowa
- Des Moines Township, Pocahontas County, Iowa
- Des Moines Township, Polk County, Iowa
- Des Moines Township, Van Buren County, Iowa
- Des Moines Township, Jackson County, Minnesota

== Other uses ==
- Des Moines Building, listed on the National Register of Historic Places in Polk County, Iowa
- Des Moines-class cruiser used by the US Navy

== See also ==
- "Dez Moines", a song by American metalcore band The Devil Wears Prada from the album With Roots Above and Branches Below
