= Des Moines Township, Iowa =

Des Moines Township, Iowa may refer to:

- Des Moines Township, Boone County, Iowa
- Des Moines Township, Dallas County, Iowa
- Des Moines Township, Jasper County, Iowa
- Des Moines Township, Jefferson County, Iowa
- Des Moines Township, Lee County, Iowa
- Des Moines Township, Pocahontas County, Iowa
- Des Moines Township, Polk County, Iowa
- Des Moines Township, Van Buren County, Iowa
