= Lemoine =

Lemoine or Le Moine is a French surname meaning "Monk". Notable people with the surname include:

- Adolphe Lemoine, known as Lemoine-Montigny (1812–1880), French comic-actor
- Anna Le Moine (born 1973), Swedish curler
- Antoine Marcel Lemoine (1763–1817) musician, music publisher, father to Henry
- Benjamin-Henri Le Moine (1811–1875), Canadian politician and banker
- C.W. Lemoine, American author
- Claude Lemoine (born 1932), French chess master and journalist
- Cyril Lemoine (born 1983), French cyclist
- Émile Lemoine (1840–1912), French geometrician
- Fabien Lemoine (born 1987), French footballer
- Felipe Ribero y Lemoine (1797–1873), Spanish politician, governor, minister and military leader
- Gabriel Lemoine (born 2001), Belgian footballer
- Georges Lemoine (1841–1922), French chemist and hydrologist
- Georges Lemoine (politician) (1934–2025), French politician
- Henri Lemoine (cyclist) (1909–1981), French cyclist
- Henri Lemoine (fraudster) (fl. 1902–1908), French fraudster
- Henry Lemoine (1786–1854), piano teacher, music publisher, composer
- Jacques-Antoine-Marie Lemoine (1751–1824), also Lemoyne, French painter
- Jake Lemoine (born 1993), American baseball player
- James MacPherson Le Moine (1825–1912), Canadian writer, lawyer and historian
- Jean Lemoine (1250–1313), French canon lawyer, cardinal, bishop and papal legate
- Jean-Luc Lemoine (born 1970), French comedian and TV presenter
- Jean-René Lemoine (born 1959), Haitian comedian and film and theatre director
- Jim LeMoine (born 1945), American football player
- Jordy Lemoine (born 1988), French singer
- Lilia Lemoine (born 1980), Argentinian cosplayer and politician
- Louis Lemoine (1764–1842), French general of the French Revolutionary Wars
- Ludovic Lemoine (born 1986), French wheelchair fencer
- Marcel Lemoine (1933–2018), Belgian footballer
- Marianne Lemoine-Goumard, French astrophysicist
- Marie-Victoire Lemoine (1754–1820), French painter
- Nick Lemoine (born 1957), British academic
- Pablo Lemoine (born 1975), Uruguayan rugby union player
- Patricia Lemoine (born 1961), French politician
- Pierre Le Moine (1927–2023), French activist and architect
- Pierre-Antoine Lemoine (1605–1665), French painter
- Pierre Camille Le Moine (1723–1800), French archivist
- Rebecka Le Moine (born 1990), Swedish politician
- René Lemoine (1905-1995), French Olympic fencer
- Roger Le Moine (1933–2004), Canadian professor of literature, and literary critic
- Victor Lemoine (1823–1911), French horticulturist
- Virginie Lemoine, French humourist, comedian and actor
- Yvan Lemoine (born 1981), chef and author

== See also ==
- Lemoine point, the intersection of the symmedians of a triangle
- Cardinal Lemoine station, a station on Paris Metro Line 10
- Le Moine, a mountain of the Pennine Alps, in Switzerland
- Lemoyne (disambiguation)
- Lemoine River, tributary of Rivière Pot au Beurre, Montérégie, Quebec, Canada
