= Moyne =

Moyne may refer to:

== Places ==
- Moyne, County Tipperary, a civil parish in the barony of Eliogarty, North Tipperary, Ireland
- Moyne, County Wicklow, a civil parish in County Wicklow, Ireland
- Moyne Abbey, County Mayo, Ireland
- Moyne Townland, County Mayo, Ireland
- Shire of Moyne, Victoria, Australia
  - Moyne River

== Other ==
- Baron Moyne, a title in the Peerage of the United Kingdom
- John Moyne, MP for Calne, Wiltshire, United Kingdom
- Moyne Kelly (1901–1988), American politician from Texas
- Moyne Commission, a Royal commission assembled to look at conditions of British Empire nationals living in the British West Indies.

== See also ==
- Moina (disambiguation)
- Lemoyne (disambiguation)
- Moynes Court, a Grade II* listed building in the village of Mathern, Monmouthshire, Wales
