= Mona =

Mona may refer to:

== People ==
- Mona (name), a female given name, nickname and surname
- Mona (Angolan footballer) (born 1997)
- Mona (Brazilian footballer), Marcelo Alexandre Pires Correia (born 1973)
- Mona, ring name of American wrestler Nora Greenwald

== Museums ==
- Museum of Nebraska Art, Kearney, Nebraska, US
- Museum of Neon Art, Los Angeles, California, United States
- Museum of Northwest Art, La Conner, Washington, United States
- Museum of Old and New Art, Hobart, Tasmania, Australia

== Music ==
- Mona (band), a Nashville-located alternative rock band
  - Mona (album), released in 2011
- Mona – The Carnivorous Circus, a 1970 album by The Deviants
- "Mona (I Need You Baby)", a 1957 song by Bo Diddley
- "Mona", a song by James Taylor from his 1985 album That's Why I'm Here
- "Mona", a song by the Beach Boys from their 1977 album Love You
- "Mona", a song by Nick Mulvey from his 2022 album New Mythology
- Mona (opera), a 1912 opera by Horatio Parker

== Places ==
=== Settlements ===
- Mona, Anglesey, a village on the Welsh island of Anglesey (in the UK)
- Mona, Iowa, United States, an unincorporated community
- Mona, Jamaica, a residential neighbourhood of Kingston
- Mona, South Australia, part of the town of Bute, Australia
- Mona, Utah, United States, a city
- Mona Mona, Queensland, a locality in the Shire of Mareeba, Queensland, Australia
- Mona Township, Ford County, Illinois, United States

=== Landforms ===
- Anglesey (Latin: Mona), an island off the north-west coast of Wales
- Isla de Mona, Puerto Rico, an island in the Mona Passage
- Isle of Man (Latin: Mona), a self-governing British Crown dependency in the Irish Sea
- Mona Islands, Siberia, Russia
- Mona Lake, Michigan, United States
- Mona Passage, separating the islands of Hispaniola and Puerto Rico
- Mona Reservoir, Utah, United States

=== Fictional locations ===
- Isle of Mona, a fictionalized version of the Isle of Anglesey in Lloyd Alexander's "The Chronicles of Prydain" series

== Science and technology ==
- Modular Neutron Array
- MONA numbering scheme used for moths of North America, also called a Hodges number
- XPeng Mona M03, a battery electric compact sedan

== Ships and boats ==
- SS Mona (1832), a British paddle steamer
- SS Mona (1878), a British packet steamer
- SS Mona (1889), a British paddle steamer originally named Calais/Douvres
- SS Mona (1907), a British packet steamer originally named Hazel
- USS Mona II (1918), a United States Navy patrol boat in commission from 1918 to 1919
- RNLB Mona (ON 775), 1935, a lifeboat based at Broughty Ferry in Scotland
- MV Mona (1936), a Swedish coaster in service 1957–63
- MV Mona (1937), a Greek cargo ship wrecked in 1976

== Other uses ==
- Monā, an ASCII art character
- Mona (deity), in mythology
- Mona (elephant), at Birmingham Zoo in the United States
- Mona language (disambiguation)
- Mona monkey, a species of monkey that lives through Western Africa and the Caribbean
- Mona railway station, Pakistan
- Mona or Mouna, an Algerian pastry
- RAF Mona, a Royal Air Force station on the island of Anglesey, Wales
- Mona the Virgin Nymph, also known as Mona, a 1970 theatrical release pornographic film
- Mona, a 2019 novel by Argentinian author Pola Oloixarac
- Mona, the codename for Morgana, a character from Persona 5
- Easter mona, a cake that is eaten on Easter in Catalonia and Valencia

== See also ==
- Moana (disambiguation)
- Moina (disambiguation)
