= Moine =

Moine, French for "monk", may refer to:

- A' Mhòine, a peninsula in northern Scotland
- Le Moine, a mountain of the Pennine Alps
- Moine (river), a tributary of the Sèvre Nantaise in western France
- La Moine River, a tributary of the Illinois River in western Illinois in the United States
- Moine Thrust Belt, a major geological feature in the north-west of Scotland
- Moine Supergroup, metamorphic rocks that form the dominant outcrop of the Scottish Highlands

== People with the surname ==
- Antonin Moine (1796–1849), French sculptor
- Claude Moine or Eddy Mitchell (born 1942), French singer and actor
- Jean-Jacques Moine (born 1954), French swimmer
- Mario Moine (born 1949), Argentine politician
- Michel Moine (1920–2005), French journalist and parapsychologist
- Roger Moine, an SC Bastia player

== See also ==
- Des Moines, Iowa
- Tête de Moine a Swiss cheese
- Lemoine, a surname
- Moina (disambiguation)
