= Tower of Refuge =

Landmark in Douglas, Isle of Man

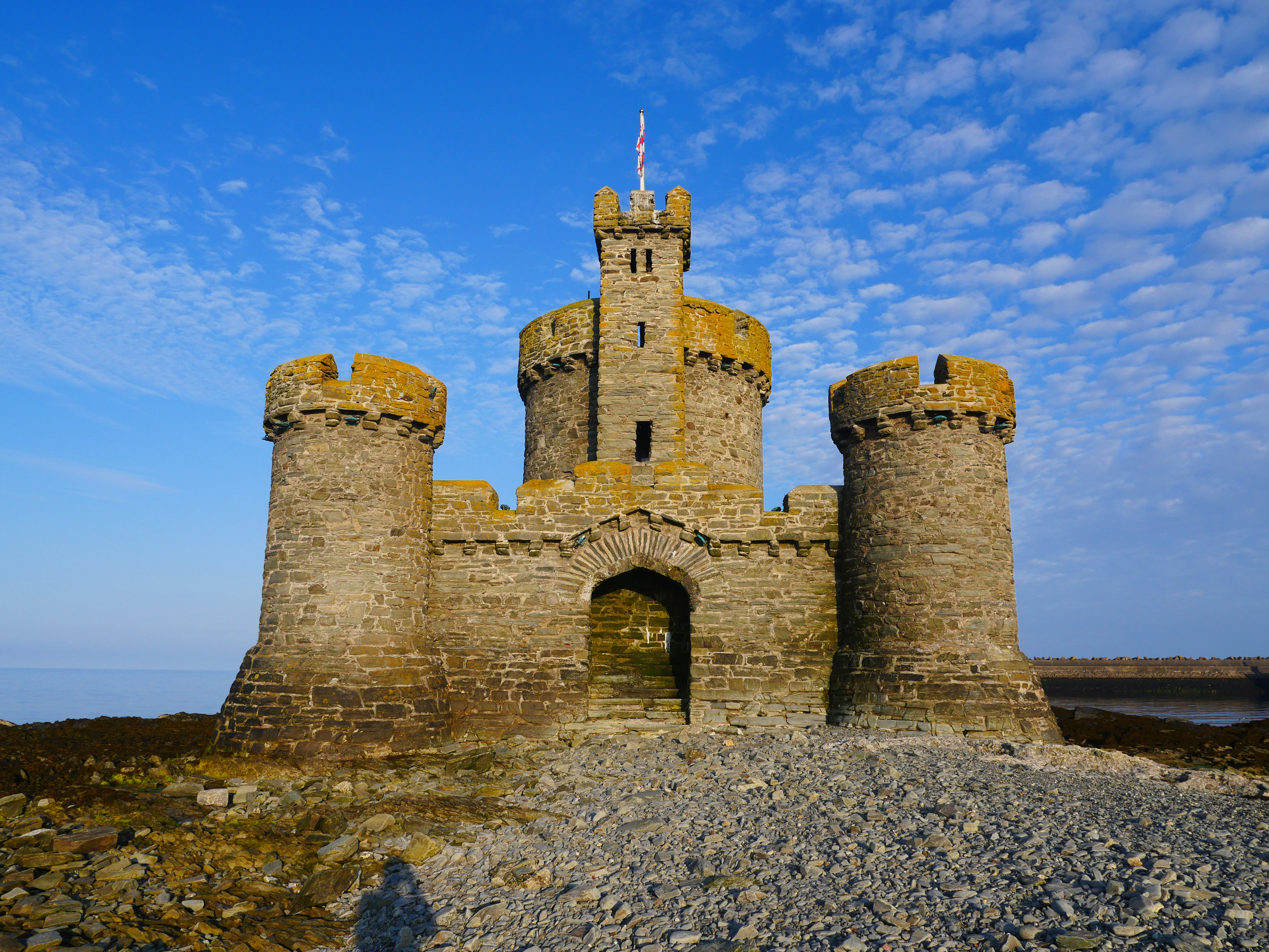
- Interactive map of Tower of Refuge
- Location: St Mary's Isle, Douglas Bay, Isle of Man
- Coordinates: 54.1504°N 4.4687°W
- Designer: John Welch
- Type: Historic
- Material: Granite
- Width: 52 m (171 ft)
- Height: 12.5 m (41 ft)
- Beginning date: 23 April 1832
- Completion date: 1832
- Dedicated to: Royal National Lifeboat Institution

The Tower of Refuge from Shipwreck, referred to as the Tower of Refuge, is a stone-built castellated structure which was erected on St Mary's Isle (also known as the Conister Rock) in Douglas Bay, Isle of Man, in order to afford shelter to mariners wrecked on the rock. The tower was constructed through the endeavours of Sir William Hillary, who had been instrumental in several rescues of sailors stranded on the rock, and which culminated in the heroic rescue of the crew of the Saint George Steam Packet Company steamer RMS St George, when it foundered on the rock in the early hours of 20 November 1830. Sir William personally contributed a high proportion of the costs and secured a substantial number of public contributions for funding the structure.

== Origins ==
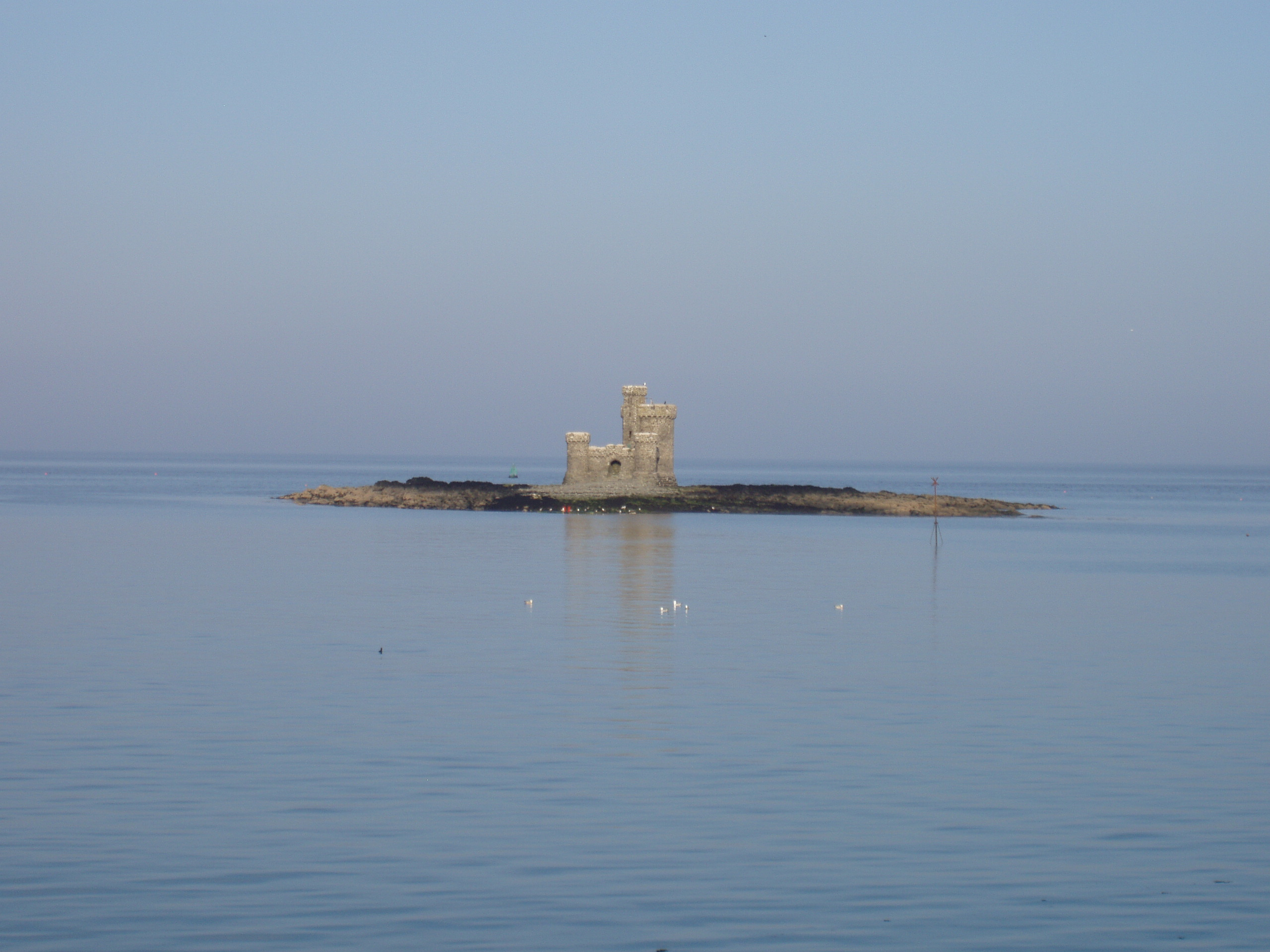
The Tower of Refuge, on St Mary's Isle

The treacherous St Mary's Isle was a notorious hazard to shipping. The rock had been in the ownership of the Quane family for many years and in 1832 Captain John Quane, Attorney General of the Isle of Man, presented the rock to Sir William Hillary in his capacity as President of the Isle of Man District of what was then referred to as the National Institution for the Preservation of Life from Shipwreck, which subsequently became the Royal National Lifeboat Institution.

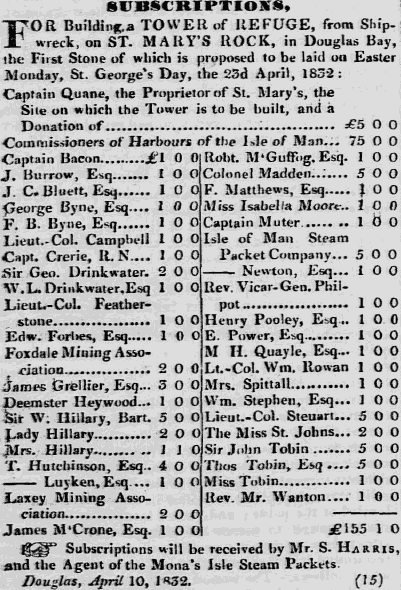
A list of benefactors towards the construction of the Tower of Refuge, and a statement concerning the ceremonial laying of the first stone, April 1832.

The cost of the construction of the tower amounted to £254 12 shillings. There were 63 subscribers whose total donations amounted to £181 6 shillings, which left a balance of £73 6 shillings due to the builder and architect. This sum was therefore met by Sir William, despite him and his family having already contributed £8. Among the subscribers to the building of the tower were the Commissioners of the Isle of Man Harbours (£75), the Foxdale and Laxey mines (£2 each), the Mona Packet Company (£5), John Quane (£5), and the Tobin family (£12). The average subscription was £1 and came from many of the well known Manx families. One particular donation was from Thomas Tobin who donated a St George's Ensign which had cost him £5. This was the first flag to be flown from the tower on Thursday 15 August 1833.

== Design and construction ==
Designed by renowned local architect John Welch, of the company Hansom & Welch, the first stone was laid by Sir William on 23 April 1832, in the presence of Archdeacon Benjamin Philpot, Members of the House of Keys and numerous other prominent residents of Douglas.

The structure is castellated in the style of the 13th century, consisting of a main tower with turret, curtain wall and two corner turrets all with hanging parapets and corbels similar to those at Peel Castle and Castle Rushen.

The tower originally housed a bell for the summoning of help and in addition the tower was stocked with provisions such as bread and fresh water for any shipwrecked persons. A further idea was to have a small boat accommodated within the structure, but this was not continued with.

Despite the construction of the tower the waters of Douglas Bay remained perilous, particularly during periods of easterly storms. Ironically in the latter weeks of 1832 two vessels foundered in Douglas Bay (although not on the Conister Rock), and were lost with all hands.

Other landmark buildings in the Isle of Man designed by Welch include King William's College and the Smelt Monument.

== Centenary celebrations ==
A celebration of the construction of the Tower of Refuge was held on 9 May 1932. The celebrations included a visit to the Isle of Man by Sir Godfrey Baring, the then Chairman of the Royal National Lifeboat Institution who was a guest of the Lieutenant Governor of the Isle of Man, Sir Claude Hill. The celebrations also featured the Douglas Lifeboat and Rocket Brigade and culminated with an evening at the Gaiety Theatre.

== Additional historical information ==
It has been suggested that the name Tower of Refuge comes from an 1833 poem by William Wordsworth. Whilst Wordsworth did write a poem concerning the structure during a visit to Douglas in 1833, the name Tower of Refuge had been synonymous with the structure since its conception.

For many years rowing boats would be available for hire on Douglas Promenade during the summer tourist season for the pleasure of visitors, and the tower was (providing the tide was not ebbing) the main destination, with refreshments available on the tower during the summer.

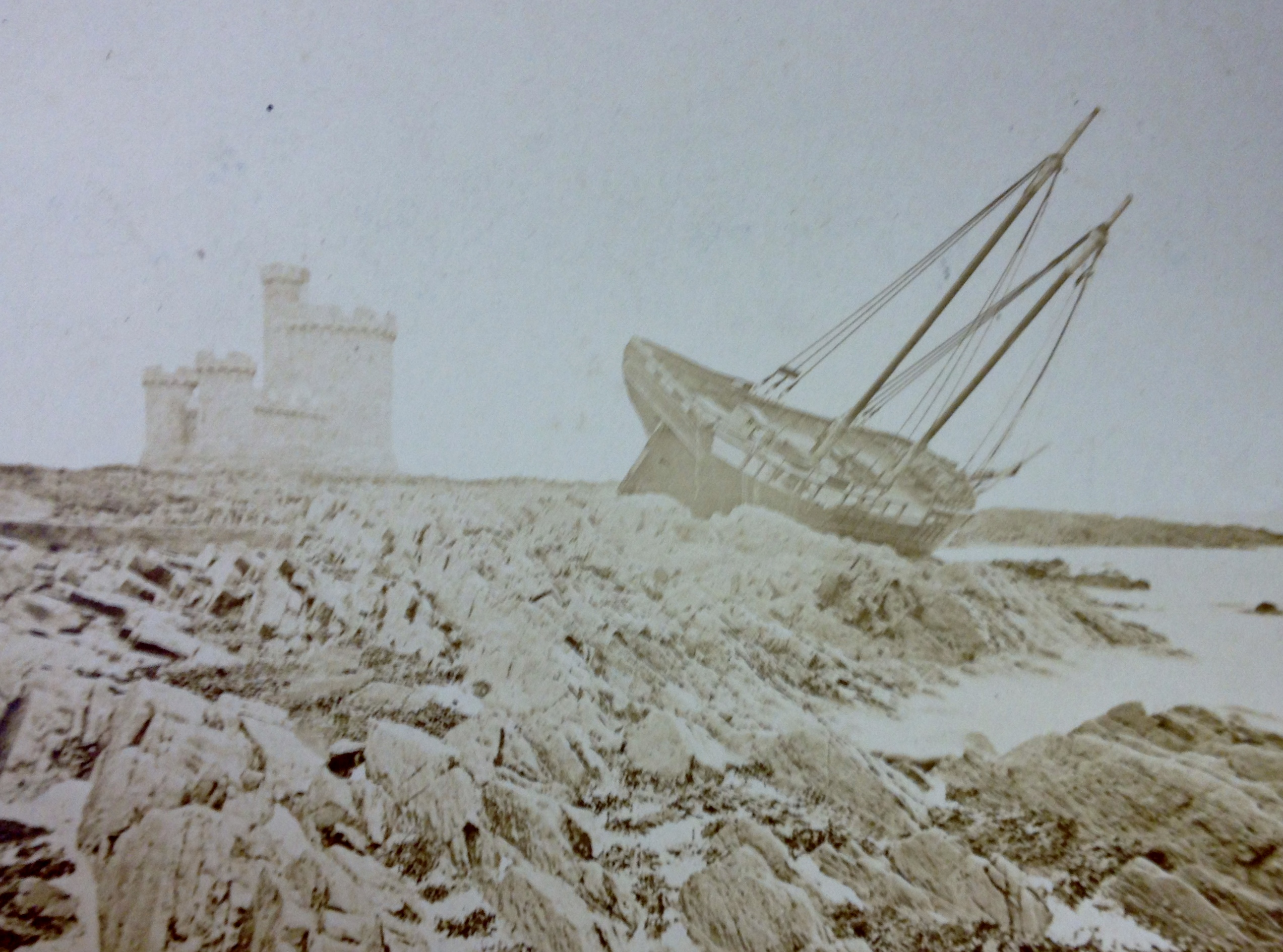
The Thomas Parker wrecked in 1867

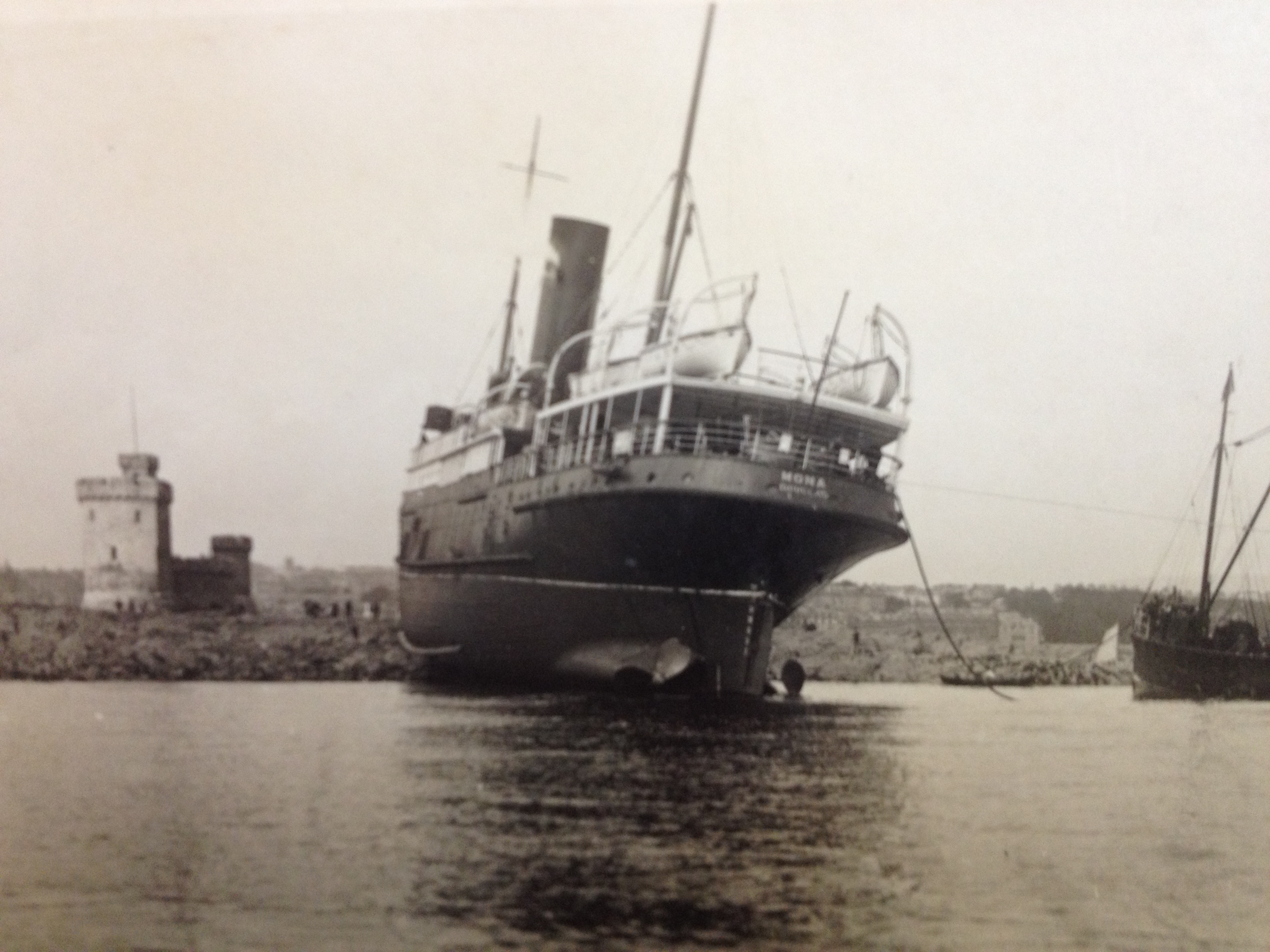
Isle of Man Steam Packet Company vessel RMS Mona aground on the Conister Rock. Note the whitewashed seaward side of the tower, supposed to make it more visible to shipping.

Despite the construction of the tower, the Conister Rock has continued to be a potential hazard to shipping using the Port of Douglas. In 1867 the schooner Thomas Parker was driven onto the rock in a storm. Another incident occurred on 2 July 1930, when the Isle of Man Steam Packet Company vessel RMS Mona ran ashore on the Conister Rock. At the time the seaward side of the tower was coated in whitewash, and in view of the accident the outer face of the Victoria Pier was also painted white in order to make it more distinctive.

The Conister Rock has always been accessible from Douglas shore during periods of low water on spring tides, although the walk to the tower could be somewhat perilous. During work undertaken on the tower in the early 2000s, a makeshift causeway was constructed to enable plant machinery to access the rock. This has improved access to the Tower of Refuge and has led to a series of community walks to the tower, organised by Douglas Town Center Management to raise money for the RNLI.

Today the Tower of Refuge and St Mary's Isle remains in the custodianship of the Royal National Lifeboat Institution.
