= Dr Colijn =

Dr Colijn may refer to

- Hendrikus Colijn, twice Prime Minister of the Netherlands
- MV Dr Colijn, a Dutch coaster in service 1936-40
