= Moan (disambiguation) =

Moaning is a sound made from the mouth and throat.

Moan may also refer to:

== People ==
- Farrah Moan, stage name of American drag queen Cameron Clayton (born 1993)
- Henny Moan (born 1936), Norwegian actress
- Kelly Moan (1911–1954), American football player
- Magnus Moan (born 1983), Norwegian Nordic combined skier
- Raymond Moan (born 1951), Irish cricketer
- Torgeir Moan (born 1944), Norwegian engineer

== Other uses ==
- Moan (film), a 1999 gay pornographic horror film
- "The Moan", a 2002 single by The Black Keys
- "The Moan", a song by Mount Eerie from the 2005 album "No Flashlight": Songs of the Fulfilled Night
- Moaning (band), an American band
- "Moanin'" (song), song composed by Bobby Timmons
- Moanin', jazz album by Art Blakey
- MENA in French

== See also ==
- Moaner (disambiguation)
- Mon (disambiguation)
- Voice
