= Moina (disambiguation) =

Moina is a genus of crustaceans within the family Moinidae.

Moina may also refer to:

== Entertainment ==
- Moina Beresford, a character in the Australian television soap opera Neighbours
- Moina go, a studio album by Habib Wahid
- Matir Moina, a Bengali drama film

== Other uses ==
- Moina belli, a species of crustaceans within the family Moinidae
- Moina, Tasmania, a locality in Australia
- Stadionul Ion Moina (1911), a former stadium in Romania

== People with the given name ==
- Moina Mathers, an artist and occultist
- Moina Meah, an alternate name for Shah Abdul Majid Qureshi, a British Bangladeshi businessman and social worker
- Moina Michael, an American professor and humanitarian

== See also ==
- Moena, a municipality in Italy
- Moner, a surname
- Mona (disambiguation)
- Moaner (disambiguation)
- Mouna, an Algerian Jewish sweet bread
- Moine (disambiguation)
- Moyne (disambiguation)
- Moin (disambiguation)
- Moyna (disambiguation)
