= Moana =

Moana (which means 'ocean' in some Polynesian languages) may refer to:

== Entertainment ==
- Moana (1926 film), a documentary
- Moana (2016 film), a Disney animated film about a Polynesian girl
  - Moana (character), the protagonist of the film
  - Moana (2016 soundtrack), the soundtrack to the 2016 Disney film
  - Moana 2, a sequel to the 2016 Disney film
  - Moana (2026 film), live-action remake of the 2016 Disney film
  - Moana (2026 soundtrack), the soundtrack to the 2026 Disney film
  - Moana (franchise), a Disney media franchise that began with the 2016 film Moana
- Moana (miniseries), 2009, based on the life of adult film actress Moana Pozzi
- "Moana", a song by Deftones from the 2003 album Deftones

== People ==
- House of Moana, Hawaiian nobility
- Moana (singer) (born 1961), lead singer of the New Zealand band "Moana and the Moahunters"
- Moana Hope (born 1988), Australian rules footballer and Australian Survivor contestant
- Moana Jackson (1945–2022), New Zealand lawyer
- Moana Jones Wong (born 1999), American surfer
- Moana Pozzi (1961–1994), Italian pornographic actress
- Moana Carcasses Kalosil (born 1963), former prime minister of Vanuatu

== Places ==
- Moana Hotel, a hotel in Honolulu, Hawaii
- Marae Moana, an ocean sanctuary
- Moana Pool, a sports complex in Dunedin, New Zealand
- Moaña, a municipality of Spain
- Moana, Nelson, a suburb of Nelson, New Zealand
- Moana, New Zealand, a settlement on the West Coast
- Moana, South Australia, a beachside suburb of Adelaide

== Other uses ==
- Moana (cicada), a genus in the family Cicadidae
- Moana (fungus), a genus
- Moana Radio, a New Zealand radio station
- Moana wrestling, a type of folk wrestling in French Polynesia
- Moana, an unofficial Amiga bootloader from Acube

== See also ==
- Ala Moana, a district of Honolulu, Hawaii
  - Ala Moana Center, the largest shopping mall in Hawaii
- Moai, monolithic human figures on Easter Island
- Mona (disambiguation)
- Te Moana, a locality in South Island of New Zealand
