= Moyne Townland =

Townland

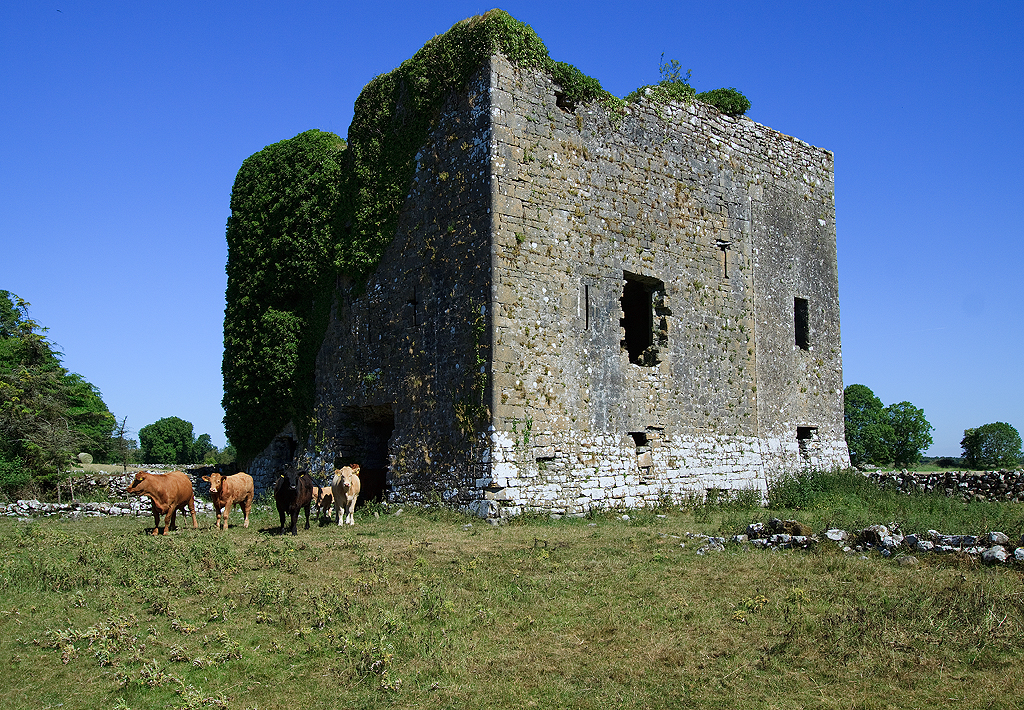
Ruins of Moyne Castle

Moyne (Irish: Maighin, meaning 'precinct') is a townland in the parish of Shrule in County Mayo, Ireland. It is bordered by Cloghmoyne and Gortbrack townlands to the west, by Toorard, Barnaboy, and Ross, County Mayo to the east. To the south is county Galway. This boundary is formed by the Black River.

Moyne townland contains a graveyard, ruined church, and a pair of standing stones inside a large circular enclosure. Surface traces of internal divisions were detected in a well known aerial photograph published in 1969. The early Christian Moyne church may have Patrician foundation. In the original Vita tripartita Sancti Patricii, Tírechán said Saint Patrick established churches in Conmaicne Cuile Tolad. This church site should not be confused with the famous Moyne Abbey in Tirawley, north Mayo.

The ruins of Moyne Castle, a tower house dating from the 15th century, stand in the eastern part of the townland on the right bank of the Black River.

== Secondary references ==
- Manning, Conleth (1987). "Excavation at Moyne Graveyard, Shrule, Co. Mayo". Proceedings of the Royal Irish Academy. Section C: Archaeology, Celtic Studies, History, Linguistics, Literature. 87C. National Parks and Monuments Branch, Office of Public Works, Dublin: 37–70. JSTOR 25506148.
- Mac Neill, Eoin (1932). "The Vita Tripartita of St. Patrick". Ériu. Ériu, vol. 11: 1–41. JSTOR 30008085.
