= Antoine Marcel Lemoine =

French violinist and violist (1763–1817)

Antoine Marcel Lemoine (3 November 1763, in Paris – 10 April 1817, in Paris) was the founder of the music publishing establishment in Paris and a virtuoso and skillful performer on the violin and viola.

His youngest son, Henry Lemoine, took over the publishing business a year before his father's death. His descendants have continued the company, later known as Éditions Henry Lemoine.

== Biography ==
Antoine Lemoine's father was a dramatic artist, who gave him his first elementary lessons on the guitar and violin, but beyond this rudimentary instruction Lemoine was self-taught. His father took the family on a wandering, restless life.

When Antoine Lemoine was sixteen and a half years old, he married. For the next few years he followed the example of his parents, wandering with his wife and earning a living by violin and guitar playing.

In 1781 he settled in Paris, where he gained a position as violinist in the orchestra of Theatre Montansier in Versailles. After playing there for two years, he resigned and started teaching guitar and violin in Paris. During the year 1789 he worked in the Theatre Monsieur orchestra as alto player.

In 1772, Lemoine began a music publishing business, called A l'Espérance (To Hope). It was continued in the 19th century by his youngest son, Jean-Henry-Antoine, later known as Henry, as Henry Lemoine and Company. Directed by descendants, since the early 20th century, it has been known as Éditions Henry Lemoine

In 1790 another publisher, Imbault of Paris, published several of Lemoine's compositions and theoretical works, including a method for the guitar. This was printed in several editions. Three years later Lemoine devoted himself entirely to music publishing but, after the French Revolution, he placed his business under capable management. He officiated as conductor successively of the orchestras of the Theatre Molière, Mareux, and of the Rue Culture and St. Catherine.

Although Lemoine had received no instruction in harmony or counterpoint, he successfully composed, arranged, and orchestrated all the music performed in these theatres. In 1795 he revised and augmented his method for the guitar, publishing this edition himself. Additionally, he continued to write compositions for other publishers. He also issued about twenty-five of his own works, consisting of variations, potpourris, etc., for guitar solo, and duos for guitar and violin.

When the six-stringed guitar, constructed in the shape of a lyre and named the lyre-guitar, became fashionable at the beginning of the nineteenth century, Lemoine wrote and published a new elementary treatise for this instrument, under the title of Method for the guitar of six strings (1805). A few years later his compositions for the guitar were eclipsed by those of Ferdinando Carulli.

Lemoine recognized the high quality of the later works of this rising generation of guitar virtuosi. He was among the first to issue the compositions of Carulli, Fernando Sor, Luigi Sagrini, Dionisio Aguado, Mauro Giuliani, Joseph Küffner and Luigi Castellacci.
