= Moaner =

Moaner may refer to:

- Moaner van Heerden (born 1951), a South African rugby player
- "Moaner" (song), by Underworld, 1997
- "Moaner", a song by Hagfish
- The Moaners, an American rock band

== See also ==
- Moan (disambiguation)
- Moina (disambiguation)
