= Strabane High School =

Coordinates: 54.837°N 7.456°W

- 61 Derry Road; Strabane, County Tyrone, Northern Ireland BT82 8LD

Information
- Type: Secondary school
- Principal: David Hampton
- Enrollment: 261

Strabane High School was a secondary school located in Strabane, County Tyrone, Northern Ireland. It was within the Western Education and Library Board area. The school colours are green, silver, and black.

== Notable students ==
- Raymond Moan (1951-), cricketer

 Sheila Simpson  1951 -    Peace walker " Nurse comes home to walk for peace "  Belfast Telegraph  16th July 1990
                            Facebook  Sheila Simpson-Brown
