= Moyna =

Moyna may refer to:

- Moyna, Purba Medinipur, a village in West Bengal, India
  - Moyna (community development block), containing the village
  - Moyna (Vidhan Sabha constituency), containing the village and CD block
  - Moyna College
- Moyna (album), a 1988 album by Ayub Bachchu
- Moyna Macgill (1895–1975), Irish-born British actress

== See also ==
- Moina (disambiguation)
- Myna, a species of bird
