= Te Moana =

Locality in Timaru District, Canterbury Region, New Zealand

Coordinates: 44°04′S 171°08′E

Te Moana is a locality in the Canterbury Region of the South Island of New Zealand. It is located about 15 kilometres (9.3 mi) west of Geraldine and bordered by Gapes Valley and Pleasant Valley to the south and Four Peaks to the north. The south branch of the Hae Hae Te Moana River runs through the area.

The nearby scenic reserve and gorge is well known by locals and in addition to being a popular camping site is home to a waterfall and deep swimming hole.

The New Zealand Ministry for Culture and Heritage gives a translation of "the sea" for Te Moana.

== History ==
The area was settled in the 1850s and was originally known as Rhubarb Flat. Farming was the economic driver in the area, however, a health resort was built in 1905 by Tom Gunnion.

The Te Moana School was built in 1891 with an average roll of 33, the first teacher was Miss R. McBeth from Pleasant Valley School. The new school was built on the site in 1975 with a combination of Education Board money and the hard work of local residents. The school would celebrate its centenary in 1992, however, like many rural schools declining numbers saw the school close its doors in 2004. The building remains today.

Te Moana was not connected with electricity until autumn of 1959.

== Notable people ==
- George Jobberns (1895–1974), geographer and educator born and educated in the area
