= Des Moines Building =

- U.S. National Register of Historic Places
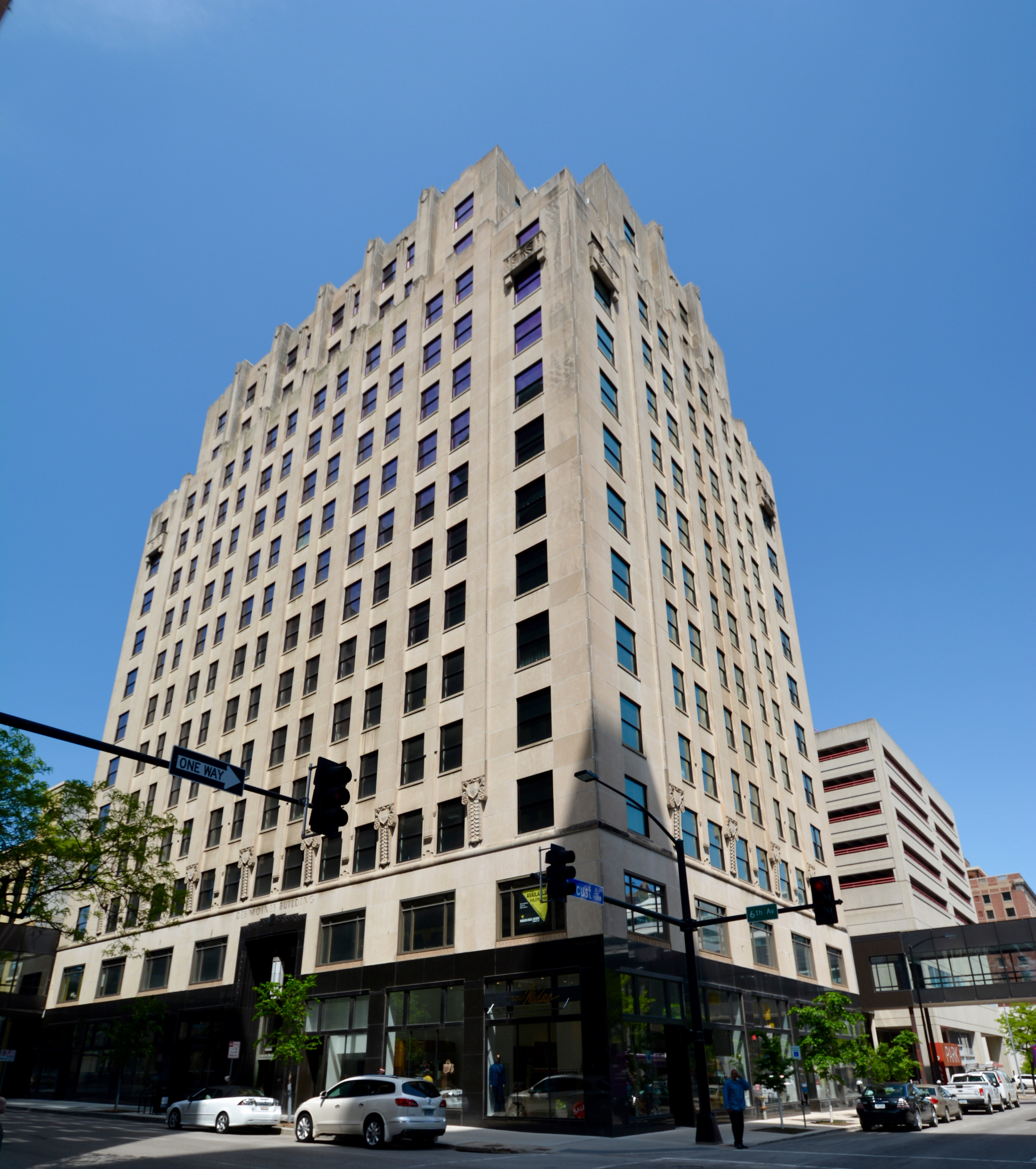

- Location within Iowa Location within the United States
- Location: 405 6th Ave. Des Moines, Iowa
- Coordinates: 41°35′13.75″N 93°37′29.21″W
- Area: less than one acre
- Built: 1930
- Architect: Proudfoot, Rawson, Souers & Thomas
- Architectural style: Art Deco; Art Moderne
- MPS: Architectural Legacy of Proudfoot & Bird in Iowa MPS
- NRHP reference No.: 13000829
- Added to NRHP: October 16, 2013

The Des Moines Building is a historic building located in downtown Des Moines, Iowa, United States built in 1930 and based on the designs of the Des Moines architectural firm of Proudfoot, Rawson, Souers & Thomas. It is a combination of the Art deco and Art Moderne styles. The 14-story structure rises to a height of 190 feet (58 m). The former office building was abandoned and in May 2011 the city of Des Moines declared it a public nuisance so as to acquire it to be redeveloped. In November of the same year they sold the building for $150,000 to Des Moines Apartments, LP who developed it into 146 loft apartments. It was listed on the National Register of Historic Places in 2013. The basement has a fitness center, laundry room, storage, bicycle storage, and a community room. The rooftop is accessible via the 14th floor and has a great 360 degree view of Des Moines. The building is also connected to the city's extensive skywalk system.

== See also ==
- National Register of Historic Places listings in Des Moines, Iowa
