= Marcel Lemoine =

Belgian footballer (1933–2018)

Personal information
- Date of birth: 28 November 1933
- Place of birth: Sint-Truiden, Belgium
- Date of death: 5 March 2018 (aged 84)
- Place of death: Sint-Truiden, Belgium

International career
Years	Team	Apps	(Gls)
1966	Belgium	3	(0)

Marcel Lemoine (28 November 1933 – 5 March 2018) was a Belgian footballer. He played in three matches for the Belgium national football team in 1966. Lemoine died in Sint-Truiden on 5 March 2018, at the age of 84.
