= Luigi Castellacci =

Italian composer

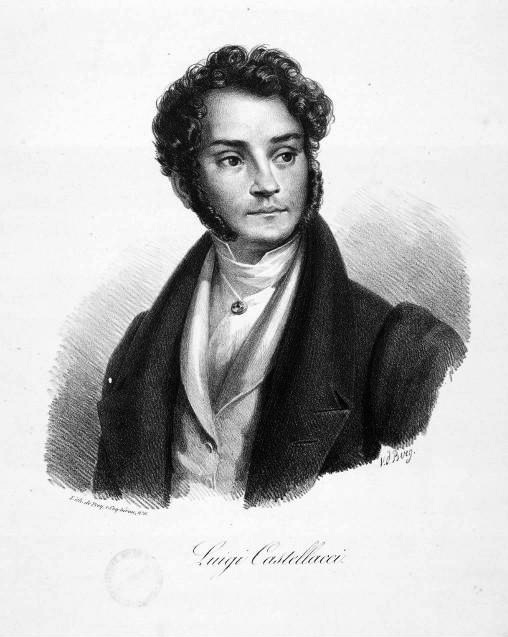
Luigi Castellacci from a lithograph by Simon Van den Berg.

Luigi Castellacci (1797 in Pisa – 1845) was an Italian virtuoso on the mandolin and guitar, an instrumental composer and the author of popular French romances with guitar and piano accompaniments.

He was the son of musical parents and as soon as he was capable of holding a mandolin, his father placed one in his hands and gave him instruction on the instrument and in the theory of music. Castellacci's progress was rapid; he performed frequently as a musical prodigy in his native city. Having thoroughly studied the mandolin for some years, he extended the sphere of his concert performances with the instrument throughout northern Italy. He then turned his attention to the guitar, devoting several years to this instrument. He taught both instruments.

About the year 1820 he left his native Pisa to tour as a professional mandolin and guitar virtuoso. He was drawn to Paris (as had Ferdinando Carulli and Matteo Carcassi). He made a name there in the musical world, particularly by his performances on the guitar and his vocal compositions with guitar accompaniment.

He was well established by 1825 and appeared as a guitarist in the most influential musical circles, being esteemed and recognized as a musician of the first rank. During his residence in Paris, he issued his first compositions; he published several compositions in other important French cities as well, where he appeared as guitar soloist.

In 1825 he commenced a tour through Germany, and passing through this country and Switzerland he visited his native land. His talent was appreciated during this tour, and upon his arrival in Milan he gave several concerts, and also in his native city, Pisa. During a brief stay there, he published several compositions for the mandolin, and then returned to Paris, where he was busily engaged as a teacher of his instruments. In 1834 he visited London and revisited it during the season of the following year, and there, too, he published compositions for the guitar. Castellacci then returned to Paris, where he lived for many years and published more than two hundred compositions, principally for the guitar and mandolin, and romances with guitar accompaniment.

== Books ==
He is the author of two instruction books for the guitar

- Complete and progressive method for the guitar, (1845) by Lemoine, Paris, 2 volumes. Issued simultaneously in Paris, Lyons and Milan, and speedily passed several editions; outside France and Italy the work appears to have attracted very little attention.
- Little method for the guitar, was published by Petit, Paris.

== Works ==
The music of Castellacci is generally of a light character, and consists for the greater part of dances, variations, and fantasies for guitar solo.

=== Published by Richault, Paris ===
- Variations for guitar solo Op. 5, 6, 7, 16, 19, 27, 40 and 41
- Progressive studies for the guitar Op. 9, 11 and 12
- Dances for solo guitar Op. 13, 14, 15, 17 and 38
- Three sketches for solo guitar Op. 43
- Fantasia for guitar and piano; Op. 44
- Bolero for guitar and piano; Op. 45
- Twelve dances for two guitars Op. 33
- Sixteen easy waltzes for two guitars Op. 34
- Potpourri for two guitars Op. 36
- Grand fantasia for cornet, guitar and violoncello

=== Published by Petit of Paris ===
- Fantasia dialogue for guitar, flute and horn;

=== Published by Breitkopf & Härtel of Leipzig ===
- Introduction and bolero in harmonics for guitar Op. 46

=== Other works ===
In 1835 Chappell of London published a collection of Six Italian songs and six nocturnes for voice with accompaniments of guitar and piano; dedicated to his pupil, Miss F. Swinfen. The most popular of Castellacci's romances appeared in Paris : DelVamor marinaro, with guitar accompaniment, in 1825, and L'Age de quinze ans, with piano, dedicated to Mile. Emilie Bourion, published in 1835, were two of the most favoured of this class of his composition.
