= Pierre-Antoine Lemoine =

French painter

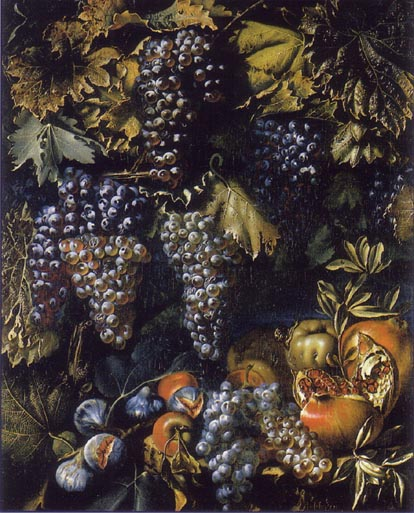
Still Life with Bunches of Grapes, Figs, and Pomegranates (1654) by Pierre-Antoine Lemoine

Pierre-Antoine Lemoine (1605–19 August 1665) was a French painter known for still lifes. He died in Paris. His Still Life with Bunches of Grapes, Figs, and Pomegranates shows Italian influence, and may have been exhibited for the academy in 1654.
