= Roger Le Moine =

Canadian professor (1933–2004)

Roger Le Moine MSRC (6 November 1933, La Malbaie – 12 July 2004, Ottawa) was an emeritus professor of Québec and French literature at the University of Ottawa.

== Biography ==
After growing up in La Malbaie, Le Moine briefly studied law before opting for literature (doctorate in 1970). As a professor, he specialized in European exotic literature, freemasonry, and, more importantly, participated in the rediscovery of Québec's 18th and 19th century literature.

He was elected at the Société des Dix (1988) and of the Royal Society of Canada (1993).

He is the nephew of writers James MacPherson Le Moine, Arthur Buies, Félix-Antoine Savard and of the painter Edmond Le Moine.
