= Raymond Moan =

Irish cricketer (born 1951)

Personal information
- Full name: Raymond Moan
- Born: 12 January 1951 (age 75); Carrigullen, Northern Ireland
- Batting: Left-handed
- Bowling: Right-arm off break

Domestic team information
- Years: Team
- 1970: Ireland

Career statistics
Competition	First-class
Matches	1
Runs scored	0
Batting average	–
100s/50s	–/–
Top score	0*
Balls bowled	96
Wickets	1
Bowling average	58.00
5 wickets in innings	–
10 wickets in match	–
Best bowling	1/58
Catches/stumpings	–/–
- Source: Cricinfo, 17 October 2018

Raymond Moan (born 12 January 1951) is an Irish former first-class cricketer.

Moan was born at Carrigullen in County Tyrone in January 1951, and was educated nearby at Strabane High School. An all-rounder for several Irish club sides, he played one first-class cricket match, aged nineteen, for Ireland against Scotland at Perth in 1970. He took one wicket with his off break bowling in the match, dismissing Terry Racionzer in Scotland's first-innings. Fellow off-spinner Michael Halliday debuted alongside Moan, with Halliday being preferred over Moan by the Irish selectors from thereon in. Moan later became a successful businessman.
