= Henry Lemoine =

French composer and music publisher

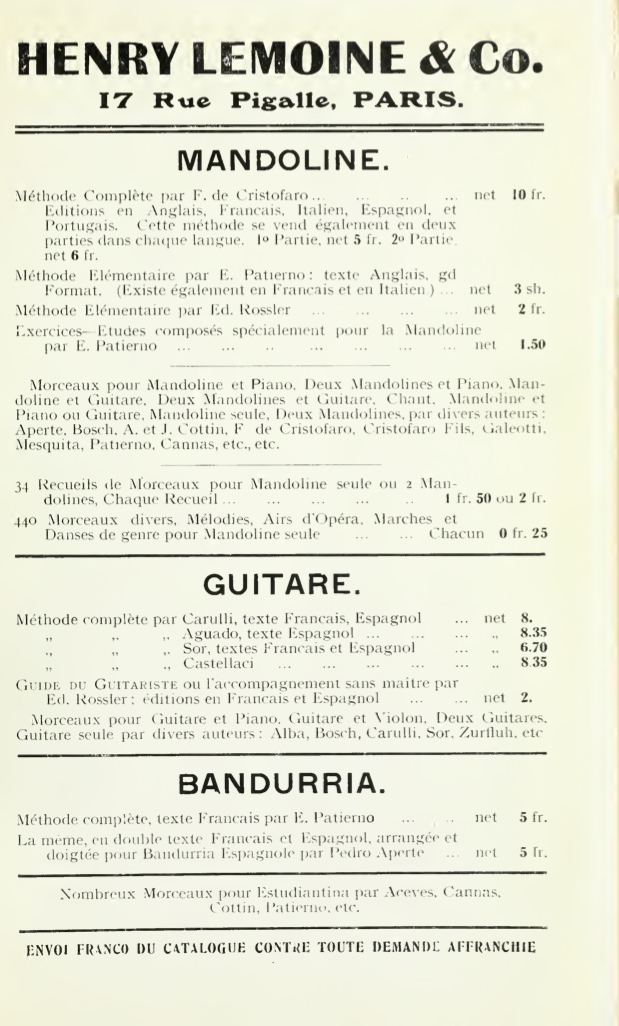
1914 advertisement by Henry Lemoine & Co. Includes advertisements for authors and composers: (Mandolin): Ferdinando de Cristofaro, E. Patierno, Ed. Rossler. (Guitar): Ferdinando Carulli, Dionisio Aguado, Fernando Sor, Castellaci. (Bandurria): E. Patierno and Pedro Aperte.

Henry Lemoine (21 October 1786 – 18 May 1854) was a French music publisher, composer, and piano teacher.

== Life ==
Henry Lemoine was born in Paris, to Antoine Marcel Lemoine and his wife. His father was a music publisher. The boy became a pupil of Anton Reicha, a composer and piano teacher.

In 1816 he took over his father's business. His father had founded the company in 1772. It still exists today under the name of Éditions Henry Lemoine.

Lemoine was the publisher for Frédéric Chopin, Augustine Renaud d`Allen, Jeannine Richer, Elise Rondonneau, Mme H. Servier, Charlotte Tardieu, Marcelle Villin, and many others. In 1844 he published Hector Berlioz's Traité d'orchestration.

He worked with Ferdinando Carulli to publish a solfège textbook by Adolphe Danhauser called Solfège des Solfèges, which is still in print. In 1850 Lemoine, then blind, turned over his company to his son Achilles Lemoine. Henry died in Paris in 1854, aged 67.

Lemoine's compositions are today generally regarded as unimportant. His piano method and harmony textbook, however, are still of much interest to students of the instrument. He composed numerous études of all levels.

== Compositions ==
Lemoine wrote a number of works of music education (including Études infantines), an extensive collection of piano pieces called Bagatelles and Recreations Musicales. His Méthode et des études de piano is still in use today.

- Gandolf on rosebush
- Study in A minor
- Estudios infantiles para piano, 1866
- Solfeo de los solfeos
- Etudes enfantines
- Solfège des solfèges
- Études enfantines pour piano
- Il turco in Italia
- Jean de Paris
