= St Mary's Isle =

St Mary's Isle (Conister Rock)
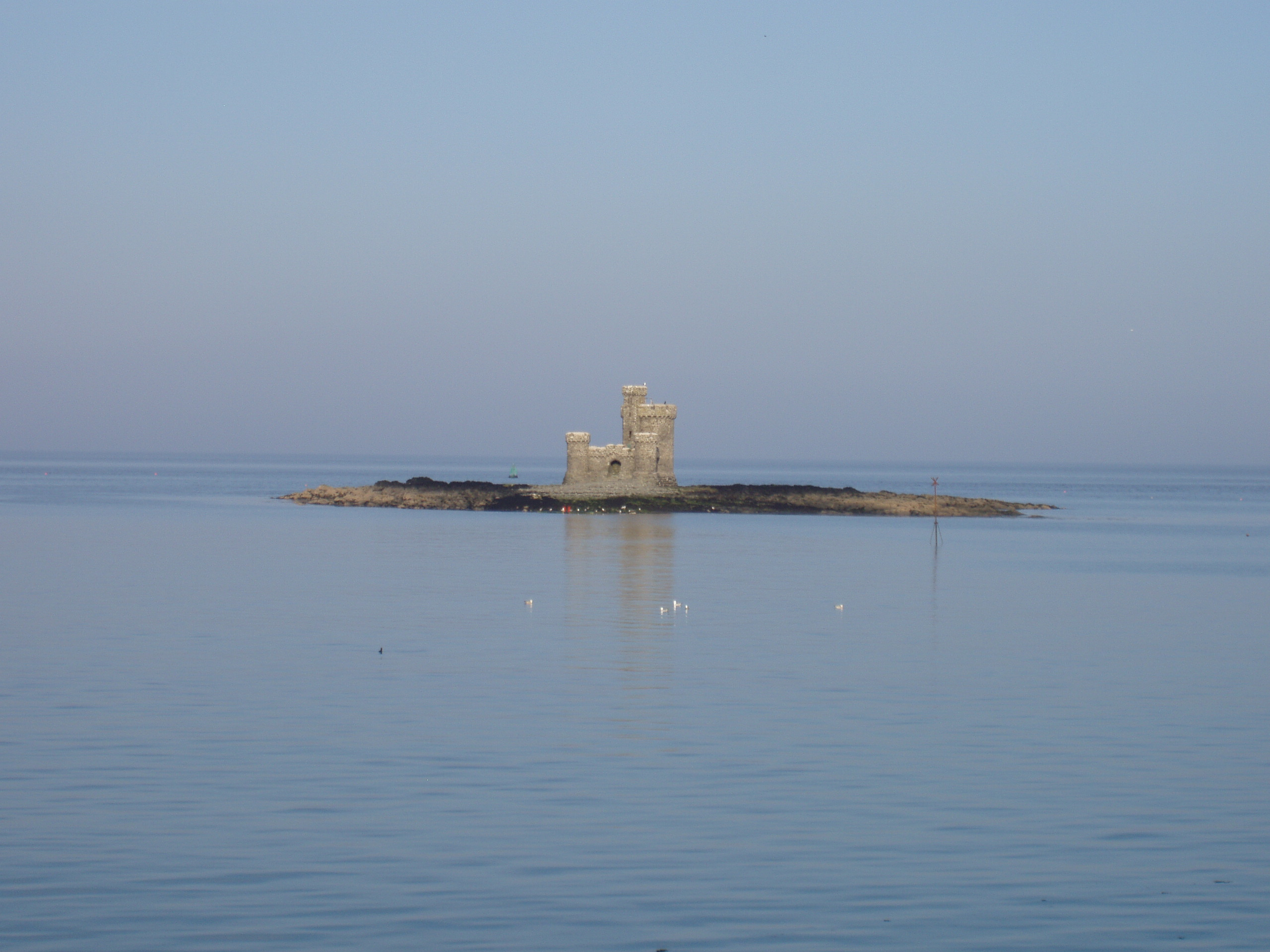
- St Mary's Isle with the Tower of Refuge
- Interactive map of St Mary's Isle (Conister Rock)
- Location: Douglas, Isle of Man
- Coordinates: 54°09′01″N 4°28′07″W

St Mary's Isle (also known as Conister Rock or the Tower of Refuge, Manx: Kione y Sker or Creg Voirrey) is a partially submerged reef in Douglas Bay on the Isle of Man. Prior to 1832 the rock was the property of the Quane family until John Quane, Attorney General of the Isle of Man, presented the rock to Sir William Hillary, in his capacity as President of the Isle of Man District of the Royal National Lifeboat Institution to build the Tower of Refuge. Since then the custody of St Mary's Isle has been held by each president of the local lifeboat association.

The reef is not far from the ferry terminal. Its eastern part, the Conister Shoals, had to be blasted away when a new harbour breakwater was built in the early 1980s. The rocks are only fully submerged at spring high tides; they can be accessed very briefly on foot at low spring tides.

== Etymology ==
Conister is a corruption of the Manx Kione y sker meaning the 'head of the reef'.

== St George rescue ==
On Friday 19 November 1830, under the command of Lieutenant John Tudor R.N., the packet steamer St George arrived in Douglas from Liverpool with mail and passengers. The St George belonged to the Saint George Steam Packet Company of Liverpool and at that time was engaged in competition with the newly established Isle of Man Steam Packet Company.

Once her passengers and mail were unloaded, the St George proceeded to take her anchorage in the vicinity of Conister Rock using the fixed chain cable which had been secured for the task. The night was stormy, with strong gusts of wind from the southwest which increased in ferocity as the wind backed to the southeast on the morning of November 20. At 05:00hrs the chain cable holding the St George began to give way and she began to drive in between the Pollock and Conister rocks.

Steam had been kept up during the night, with the crew at their stations, but the force of the sea together with the ship's proximity to the Conister Rock meant she struck the rock before any attempt to back her out could prove successful. The St George struck the rock violently, immediately filled and settled down forward, with her head to the land and lying almost broadside to the most rugged part of the rock.

Lieutenant Tudor immediately ordered distress signals to be made as well as the foremast to be cut away with a view to forming a raft so as that when the dawn came they might be rescued by boats from the lee side of the vessel, but this was found to be impractical. From his home at the Fort Anne, Sir William Hillary observed the disaster taking place and immediately made for the pier in order to initiate a rescue. Together with Lt Robinson (RN), William Corlett (agent for the St George Steamship Company), Issac Vondy his coxswain, and a volunteer crew of 14 Sir William set out to render assistance.

On approaching the St George the lifeboat's anchor was let go to the windward, and by veering down upon the wreck an attempt was made to take off the people from the weather quarter, but the surf would not enable this to be carried out. The lifeboat was then backed between the St George and the rocks, and despite warnings from Lt Tudor of the dangers this would present to the lifeboat, the crew of the lifeboat persevered and were initially successful. The lifeboat had now got into a situation where the rolling sea was causing it to become swamped and began to sustain damage with the rudder being disabled and six out of the ten oars either broken or lost. Coupled to this, Sir William, Corlett and two boatmen had been washed overboard.

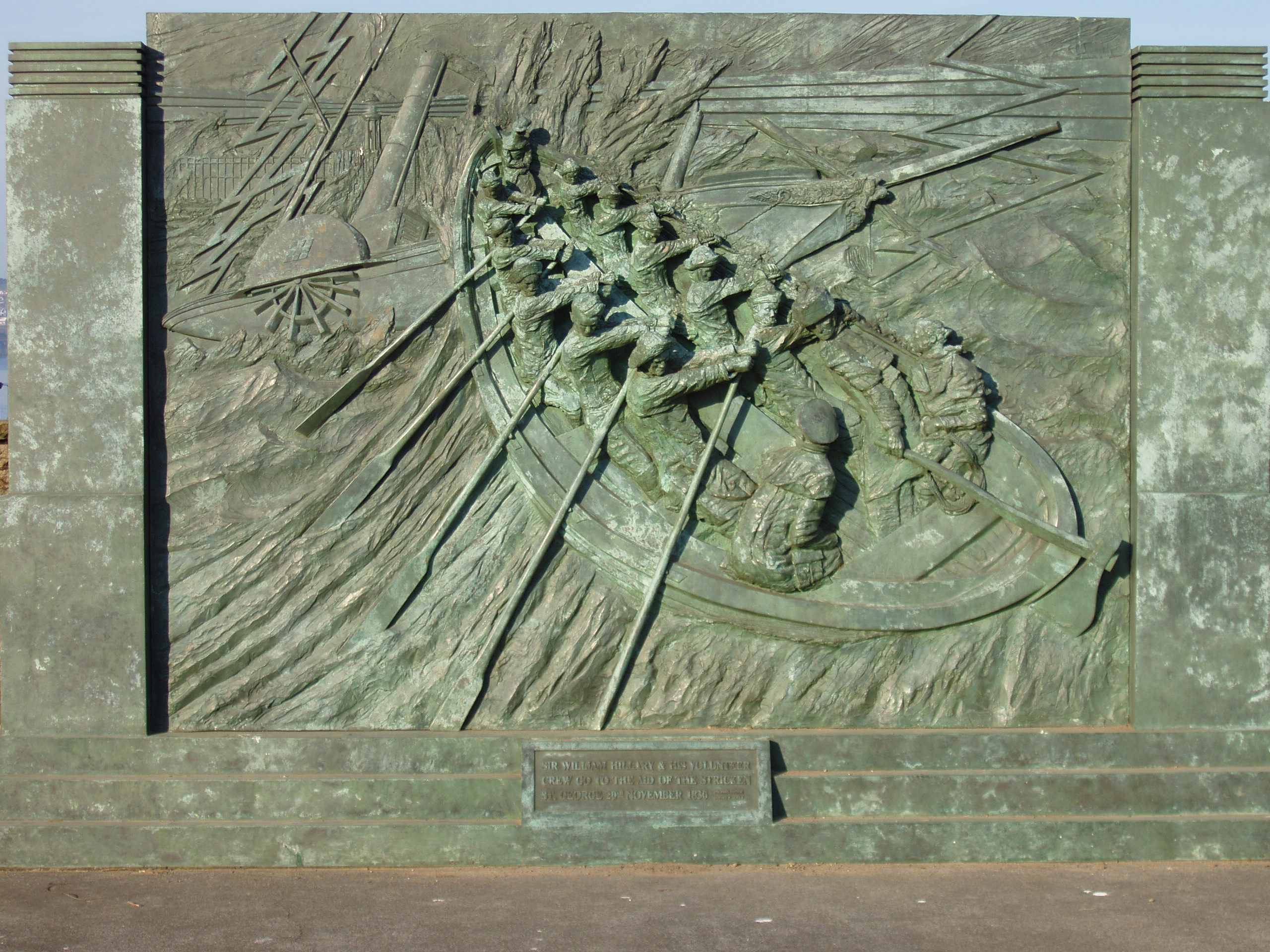
Memorial erected along the Loch Promenade in Douglas

Corlett and the two boatmen were swiftly got back into the boat, but Sir William, unable to swim, seized a rope which was hung from the vessel's side by which he was able to support himself until Lt Tudor assisted by Lt Robinson managed to get a badly injured Sir William aboard. From the disabled state of the boat and the loss of the oars it became impossible to take off the people and proceed windward by hauling up her anchor, as was originally intended. Any route to the leeward was blocked by the rigging of the mast which had been cut away and this left the lifeboat hemmed in between the wreck, the Conister Rock and by a point of rock which ran out beyond it.

The situation of the crews of the St George and the lifeboat remained perilous for two hours, a critical situation, but after time the rigging of the fallen mast was cut away with knives and an axe which were fortunately in the boat. The size of the swell increased as the tide rose and now swept the decks of the St George nearly burying the lifeboat, and one last effort was made to extricate themselves from a situation which at any time could have proved fatal.

The crew of the St George consisted of 22 and the lifeboat 18. They finally all managed to get into the lifeboat, by now taking a large quantity of water which had to be constantly bailed out by the use of buckets which had been taken from the St George. With the use of the remaining oars the lifeboat was cast off and the cable cast away, but she struck violently on the low ridge of the rock, filled, and striking again was washed over, leaving her occupants holding on by ropes. The cable was then cut, and the sea coming round the bow of the St George drove the lifeboat broadside on, upon the sheltered side of the Conister Rock thus avoiding the potential catastrophe, and they were then able to proceed towards the shore a quarter of a mile away.

They were met by two boats which had put out from the pier and proceeded through the sound to approach them under the shelter of the lee of the rock. Some of the St George's crew were transferred into the first boat, and the other boat, commanded by Lt Sleigh R.N. was able to get a line to the lifeboat and thus take it successfully in tow to the beach. None of the forty men involved were lost.

A memorial depicting the rescue can now be seen in the sunken garden on Loch Promenade, Douglas.

=== Crew of the Douglas lifeboat ===
- Sir William Hillary
- Lieut. Robert Robinson (RN)
- William Corlett (agent to the St. George's Company)
- Issac Vondy (coxswain)
- William Connor
- John Inch
- Thomas Carran
- Thomas Cannell
- William Gill
- George Thompson
- Henry Clague
- Robert Kewley
- Richard Harvey
- Philip Cottier
- John Callow
- Richard Cowell
- Unnamed person

=== Crew of SS St. George ===
- Lieut. John Tudor (RN) (Commander)
- Joseph Owen (Second Officer)
- 20 other crew members

A subsequent financial gift of £50 was given to Sir William by the owners of the St George in 1833 to be distributed amongst the lifeboat's crew.

== The Tower of Refuge ==
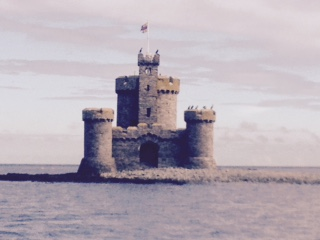
The Tower of Refuge

The structure was built upon the reef on the orders of Sir William Hillary (who helped to found the Royal National Lifeboat Institution) in 1832. After several shipwrecks upon the semi-submerged rock, he wanted a refuge for survivors until help could arrive. Sir William, who personally contributed a high proportion of the costs, secured a substantial number of public contributions for funding the building. The owner of the private islet was persuaded to give their permission for the refuge. After its construction, the building was stocked with provisions such as bread and fresh water for any shipwrecked persons. The tower originally housed a bell for summoning of help.

The refuge, which was built to look like a castle, was designed by local architect John Welch who was also responsible for the design of other landmark buildings in the Isle of Man.

The tower was the subject of a poem by Wordsworth:

COMPOSED OR SUGGESTED DURING A TOUR IN THE SUMMER OF 1833

XV ON ENTERING DOUGLAS BAY, ISLE OF MAN

"Dignum laude virum Musa vetat mori."

THE feudal Keep, the bastions of Cohorn,
Even when they rose to check or to repel
Tides of aggressive war, oft served as well
Greedy ambition, armed to treat with scorn
Just limits; but yon Tower, whose smiles adorn
This perilous bay, stands clear of all offence;
Blest work it is of love and innocence,
A Tower of refuge built for the else forlorn.
Spare it, ye waves, and lift the mariner,
Struggling for life, into its saving arms!
Spare, too, the human helpers! Do they stir
'Mid your fierce shock like men afraid to die?
No; their dread service nerves the heart it warms,
And they are led by noble HILLARY.

NOTE
14 'And they are led by noble Hillary.'
The TOWER OF REFUGE, an ornament to Douglas Bay, was erected chiefly through the humanity and zeal of Sir William Hillary; and he also was the founder of the lifeboat establishment at that place; by which, under his superintendence, and often by his exertions at the imminent hazard of his own life, many seamen and passengers have been saved.

== Gallery ==
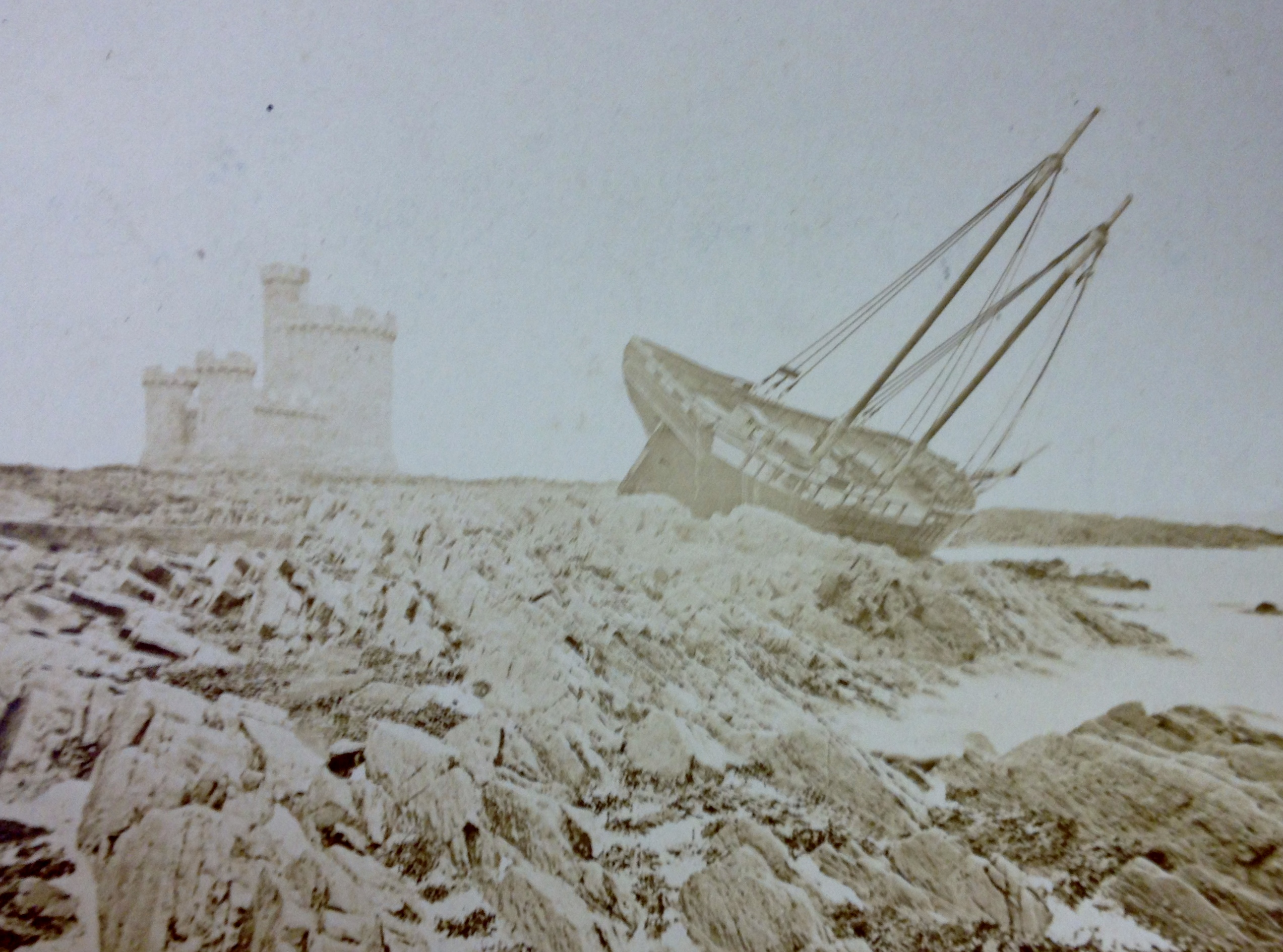
The schooner Thomas Parker, which was wrecked on St Mary's Isle during a storm on 26 October 1867

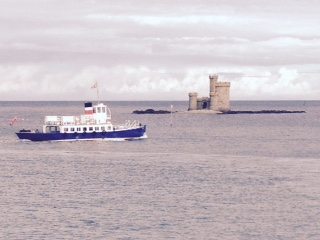
The pleasure cruiser MV Karina, under the command of Capt. Stephen Carter, passes the Conister Rock.

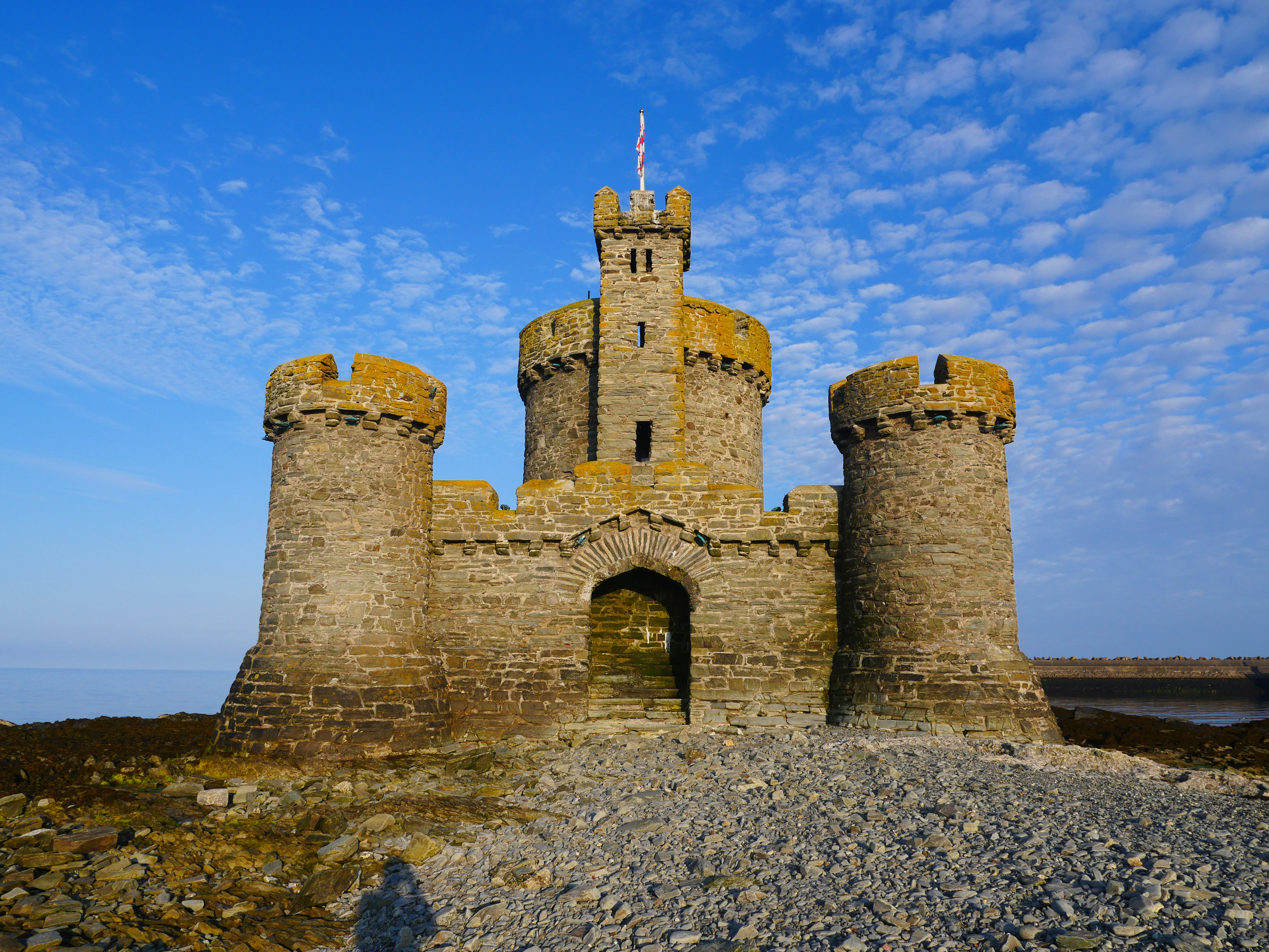
The Tower of Refuge

== Other uses ==
Conister Trust, a local Manx financial services institution, has been named after Conister Rock since its founding in 1935.

== See also ==
- Douglas Harbour
