= SS Mona (1907) =

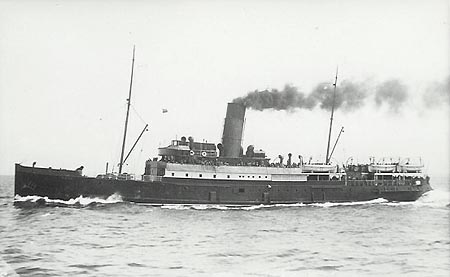
- Mona

History
- Name: Hazel; 1919: Mona
- Owner: 1907-1919: Laird Line 1919–1938: IOMSPCo
- Operator: 1907-1919: Laird Line 1919–1938: IOMSPCo
- Port of registry: Douglas, Isle of Man
- Builder: Fairfields & Co., Govan
- Cost: Purchased by the Isle of Man Steam Packet Company in 1919 for £65,000
- Launched: 13 April 1907
- Completed: 1907
- Identification: Official Number:124188
- Fate: Scrapped 1939

General characteristics
- Type: Packet Steamer
- Tonnage: 1,219 gross register tons (GRT)
- Length: 261 ft (80 m)
- Beam: 36 ft (11 m)
- Depth: 16 ft (4.9 m)
- Installed power: 3100 indicated horsepower
- Propulsion: Screw-propeller
- Speed: 18 knots (21 mph)
- Capacity: 527 First Class. 512 Second Class. Total 1039 passengers.
- Crew: 58

SS Mona (II) No.124188 was a steel built packet steamer which was originally named the SS Hazel, and was operated by the Laird Line from 1907 to 1919. She was purchased by the Isle of Man Steam Packet Company in 1919 as replacement for wartime losses. She was the second vessel in the history of the Steam Packet Company to be named Mona.

== Construction and dimensions ==
Built in the Govan yards of Fairfields & Co. in 1907, the vessel had a registered tonnage of 1,219 GRT; length 261'; beam 36' and a depth of 16'. Hazel was a twin-screw vessel fitted with two four-cylinder triple expansion engines. These developed 3100 indicated horsepower and gave the vessel a service speed of 18 knots.

Operated by the Laird Line, she mainly saw service on the Ardrossan-Portrush route.

== Service life ==
Of eleven Steam Packet ships either purchased or chartered by the Admiralty during the Great War, only four returned to service with the company after the cessation of hostilities, and consequently, new ships were going to be needed to handle the resumption of peacetime traffic. However, industry as a whole was in a disorganised and seriously run-down state after the challenges of the war years, and new vessels could not possibly be built in time for the tourist influx of 1919.

The Company compromised, and starting with the purchase of the Hazel, they set about redressing their wartime losses. Renamed Mona, she was the first of five vessels purchased by the Steam Packet Company between 1919 and 1920, and was bought from G. and J. Burns of Glasgow on 21 May 1919, who were acting on behalf of the Laird Line. The consideration was £65,000.

Mona had a maximum range of two full days steaming at an average fuel consumption of 66 tons of coal a day. She was placed mainly on the secondary and night services and had an eventful career.

On 2 July 1930, Mona ran ashore on the Conister Rock in Douglas Bay, an accident that caused the outer face of the Victoria Pier to be painted white in order to make it more distinctive.

Mona aground on the Conister Rock/St Mary's Isle, 2 July 1930

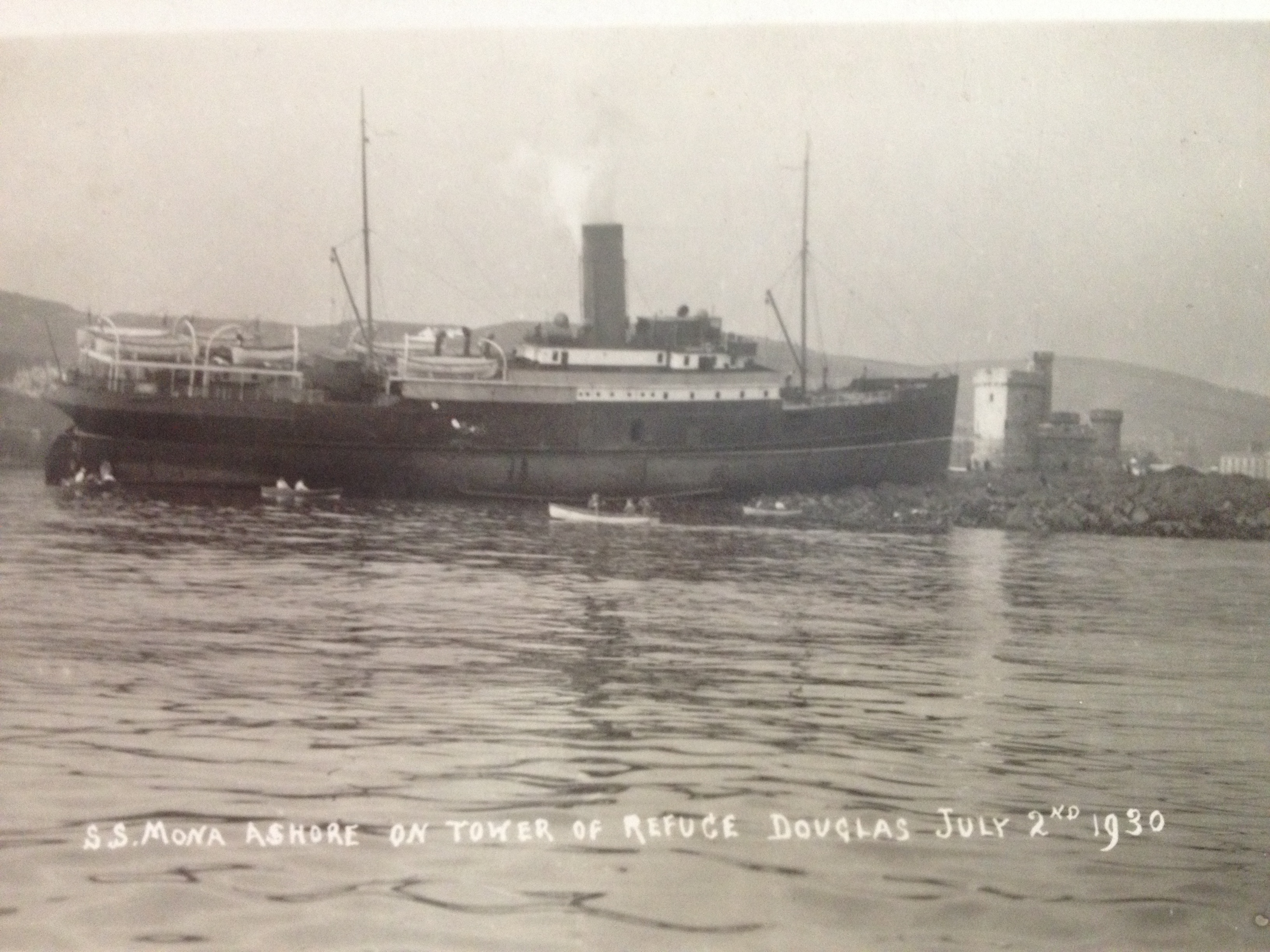

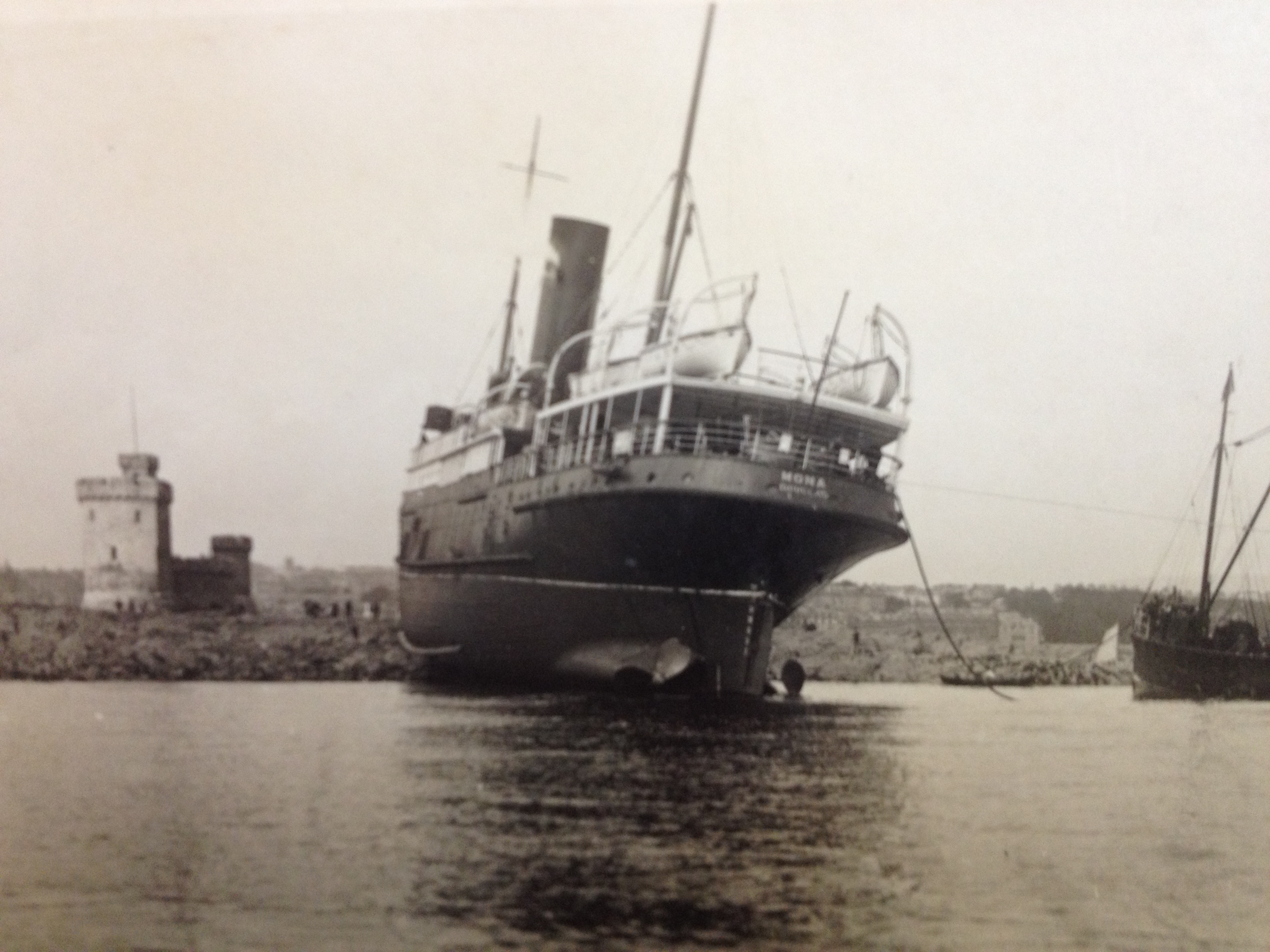

On another occasion, she rammed the Crosby Light Ship in a fog.

== Disposal ==
For the last two years of her life, Mona was mainly on reserve or cargo duty. She was sold in December 1938 to E. G. Rees of Llanelly for scrapping.
