= Lemoyne =

Lemoyne (French: le moine) can refer to:

== People ==
- Antoine Le Moyne de Châteauguay (1683–1747), French soldier and governor of Cayenne (French Guiana)
- Charles Le Moyne (actor) (1880–1956), American actor of the silent era
- Charles le Moyne de Longueuil et de Châteauguay (1626–1685), French settler in Canada
- Francis Julius LeMoyne (1798–1879), creator of first crematory in the United States
- François Lemoyne, (1688–1737), French rococo painter
- Jacques Le Moyne (c.1533–1588), French artist
- Jean-Louis Lemoyne (1665–1755), French sculptor
- Jean-Baptiste Le Moyne, Sieur de Bienville (1680–1767), colonizer and governor of French Louisiana
- Jean-Baptiste Lemoyne (sculptor) (1704–1778), French sculptor, son of Jean-Louis Lemoyne
- Jean-Baptiste Lemoyne (composer) (1751–1796), French composer
- Jean-Baptiste Lemoyne (politician) (born 1977), French politician
- John V. Le Moyne (1828–1918), U.S. Representative from Illinois
- Pierre Le Moyne d'Iberville (1661–1706), founder of French Louisiana
- Sarah Cowell Le Moyne (1859–1915), American 19th century stage actress
- Serge Lemoyne (1941–1998), Canadian artist from Quebec
- Simon Le Moyne (1604–1665), French Jesuit missionary in Upper Canada and New York
- William J. Le Moyne (1831–1905), American 19th century stage actor

== Places ==
- Le Moyne, Quebec, a neighbourhood in Longueuil, part of the borough of Le Vieux-Longueuil, and a former city, in Montérégie, Quebec, Canada
- Le Moyne River, a tributary of the St. Lawrence River, in Château-Richer, La Côte-de-Beaupré Regional County Municipality, Capitale-Nationale, Quebec, Canada
- Le Moyne, Alabama
- Lemoyne, Nebraska
- Lemoyne, Pennsylvania
- Lemoyne, fictional state in the video game Red Dead Redemption 2

== Institutions ==
- Le Moyne College, Syracuse, New York
- LeMoyne-Owen College, Memphis, Tennessee

== See also ==
- Des Moines (disambiguation)
