= Moner =

Moner is a surname. Notable people with the surname include:

- Dalmazio Moner (1291–1341), Spanish Roman Catholic priest
- John Moner, MP for Salisbury
- Fernando Moner (born 1967), Argentine footballer
- Isabela Moner (born 2001), American actress and singer

== See also ==
- Monet (name)
