= Mona language =

Mona language may refer to:

- Mwan language (Mwana), Ivory Coast
- Bwilim language (Mwano), Nigeria
