= Moyne Abbey =

Ruined Franciscan abbey in Mayo, Ireland

Coordinates: 54.202234°N 9.177070°W

- Mainistir na Maighne
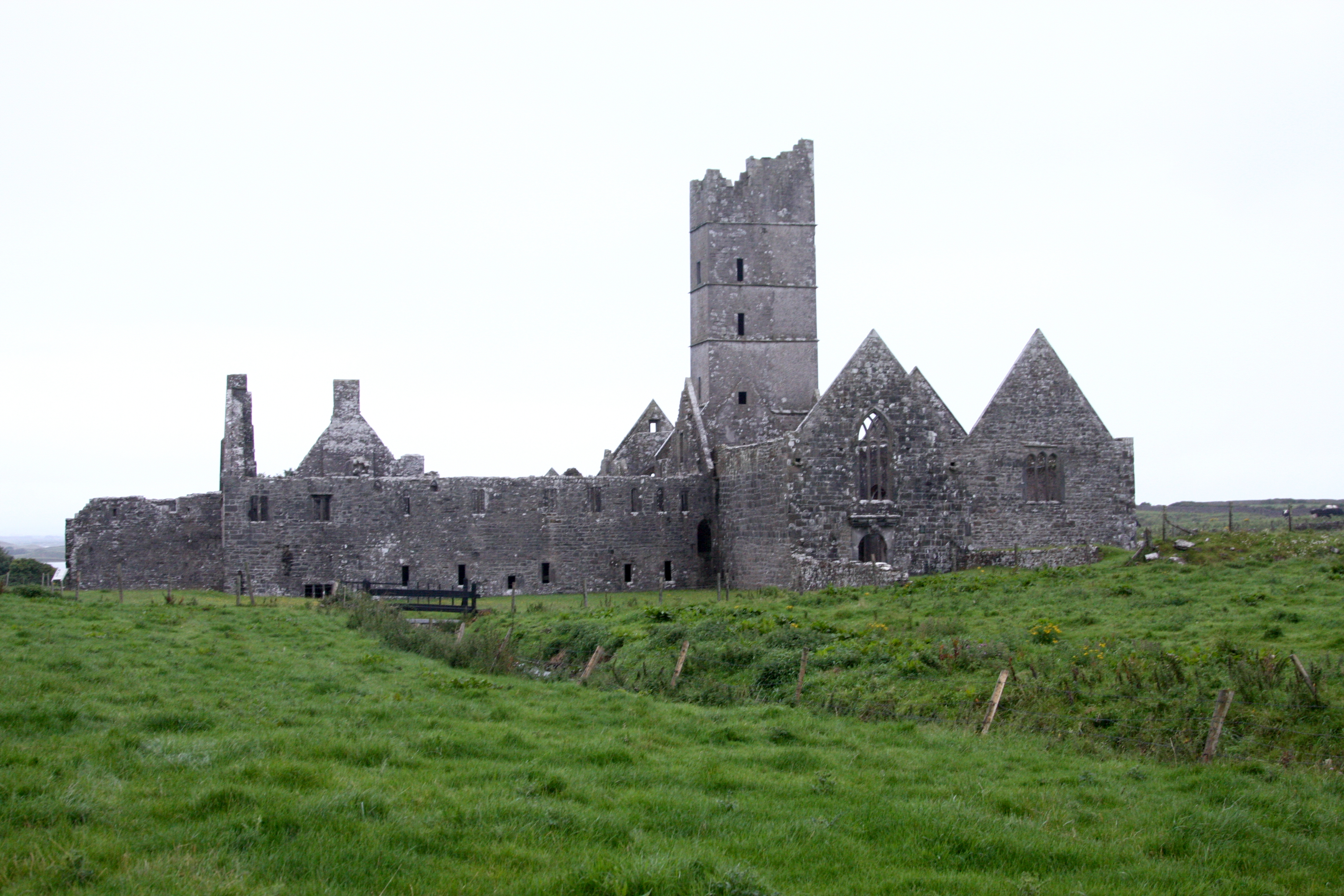
- Interactive map of Moyne Abbey

Monastery information
- Order: Franciscans
- Denomination: Catholic Church
- Established: c.1455
- Disestablished: 1590

Architecture
- Status: Inactive
- Style: Gothic

Site
- Public access: Yes

National monument of Ireland
- Official name: Moyne Abbey
- Reference no.: 103

Moyne Abbey (Irish: Mainistir na Maighne) is a ruined medieval Franciscan friary in Killala, County Mayo, Ireland. Founded at some point before 1455, the abbey was burned in 1590 (see Dissolution of the monasteries).

== History ==
The Abbey was founded before the year (1455) by Fr Nehemias O'Donoghue, who was the provincial vicar at the time, and consecrated in 1462. It is located north of Ballina on the west side of Killala Bay on the old Ballina or "French" road. Like its neighbour, Rosserk Friary, it was burnt by Sir Richard Bingham, Elizabeth I of England's governor of Connacht, in 1590 in Reformationist zeal. It's believed friars continued to reside there until about 1800.

The friary was built in the late Irish Gothic style and has extensive ruins, consisting of a church and domestic buildings situated around a central cloister. Its west doorway is a seventeenth insertion. Its east window displays fine switchline tracery.

== Gallery ==
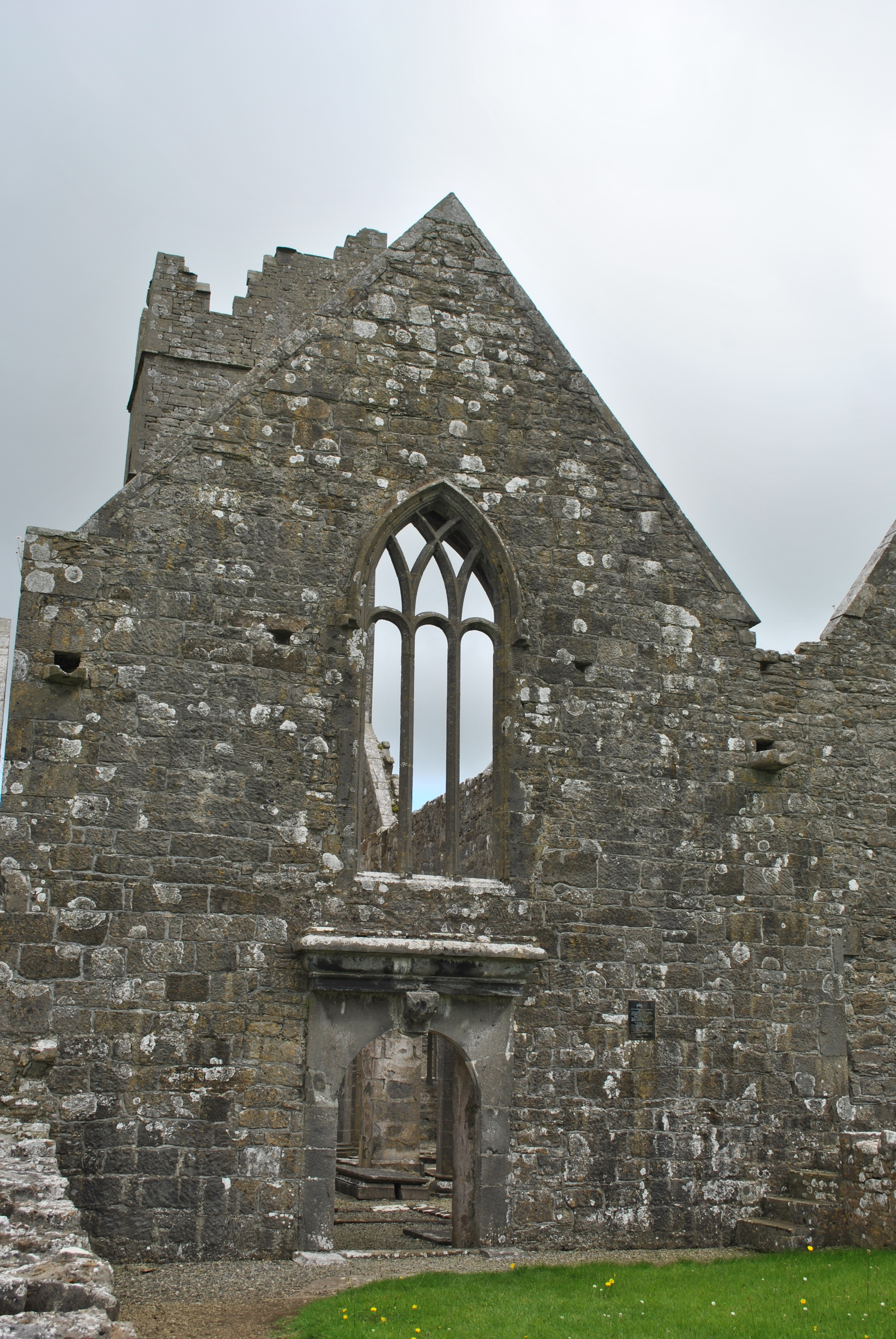

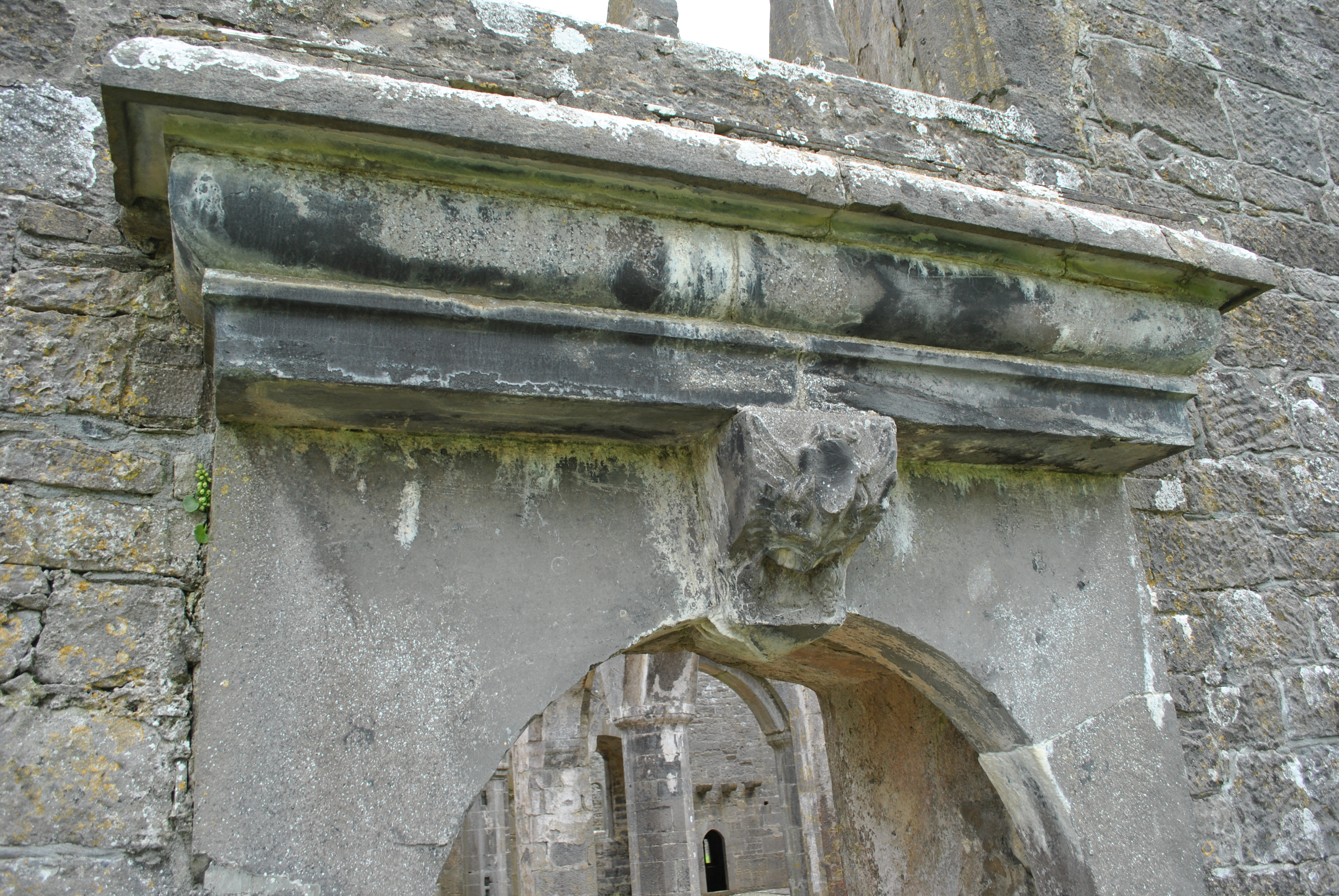

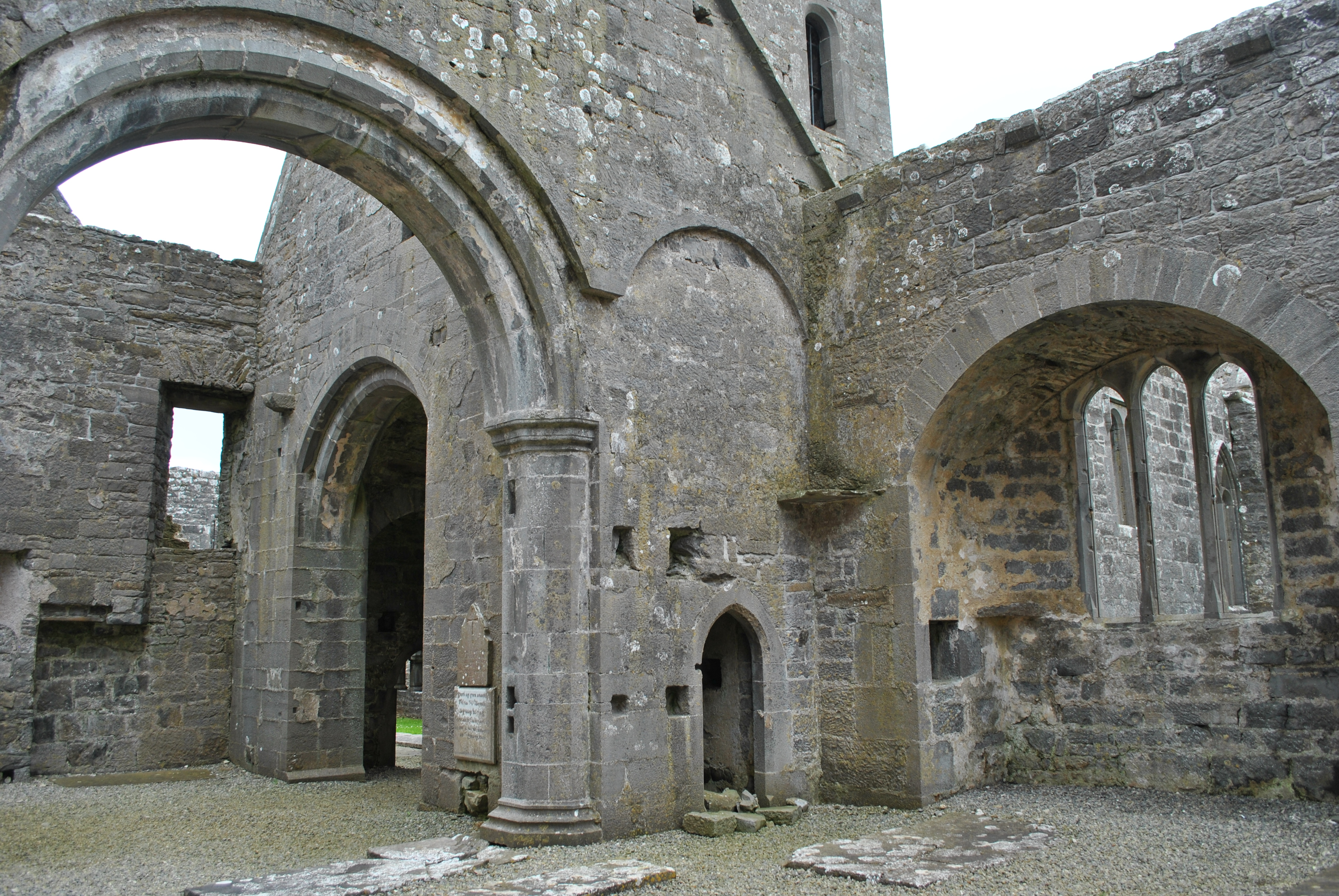

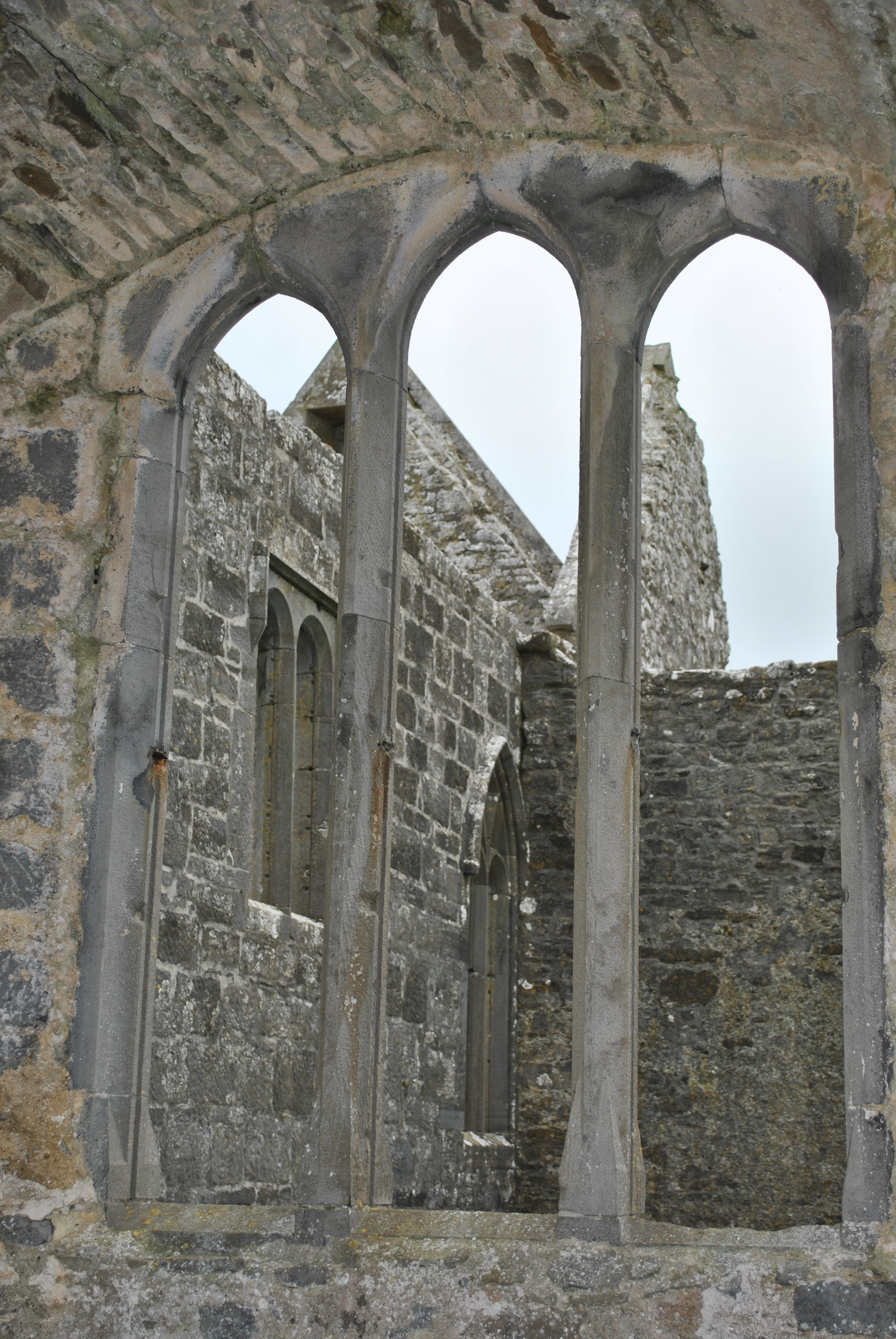

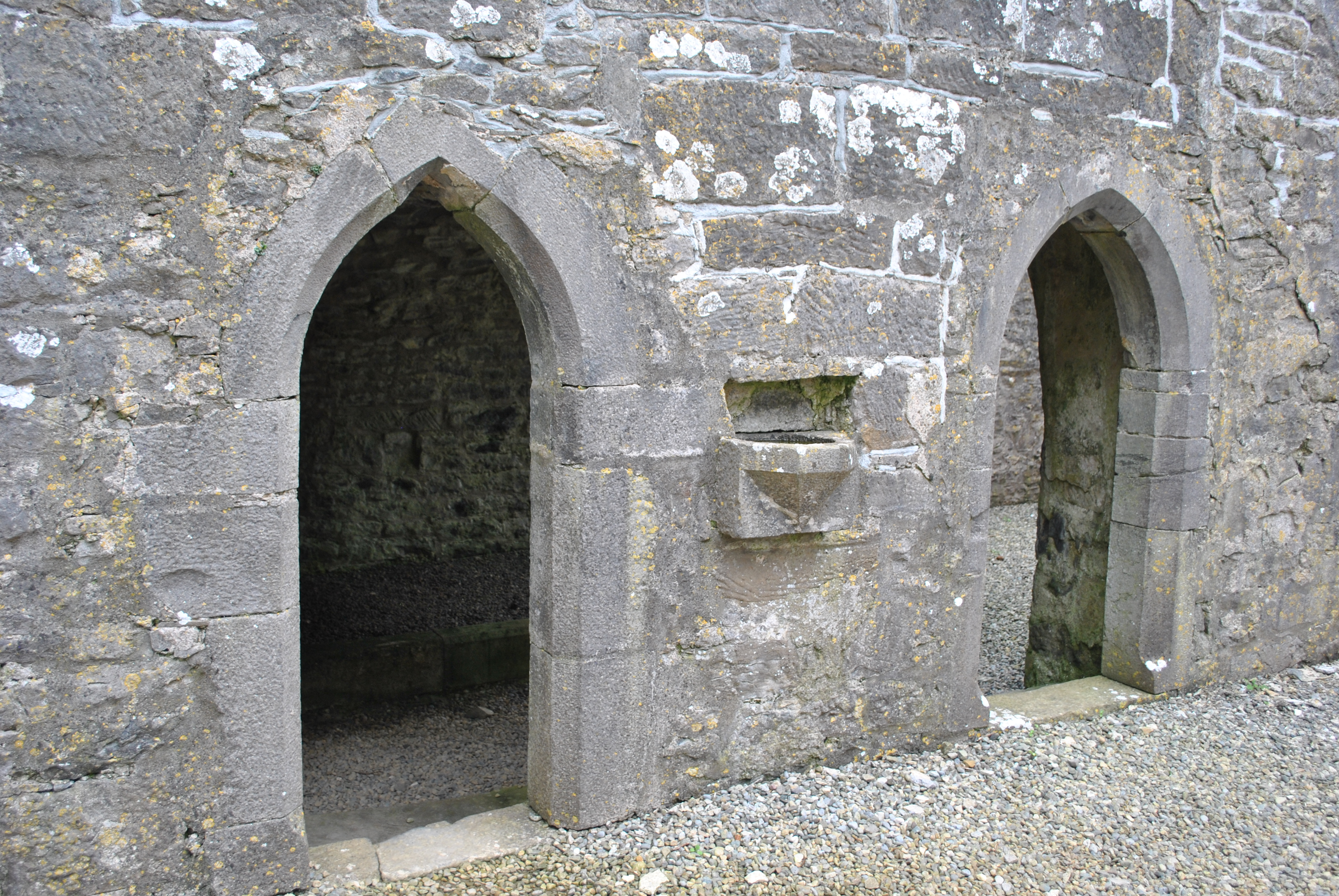

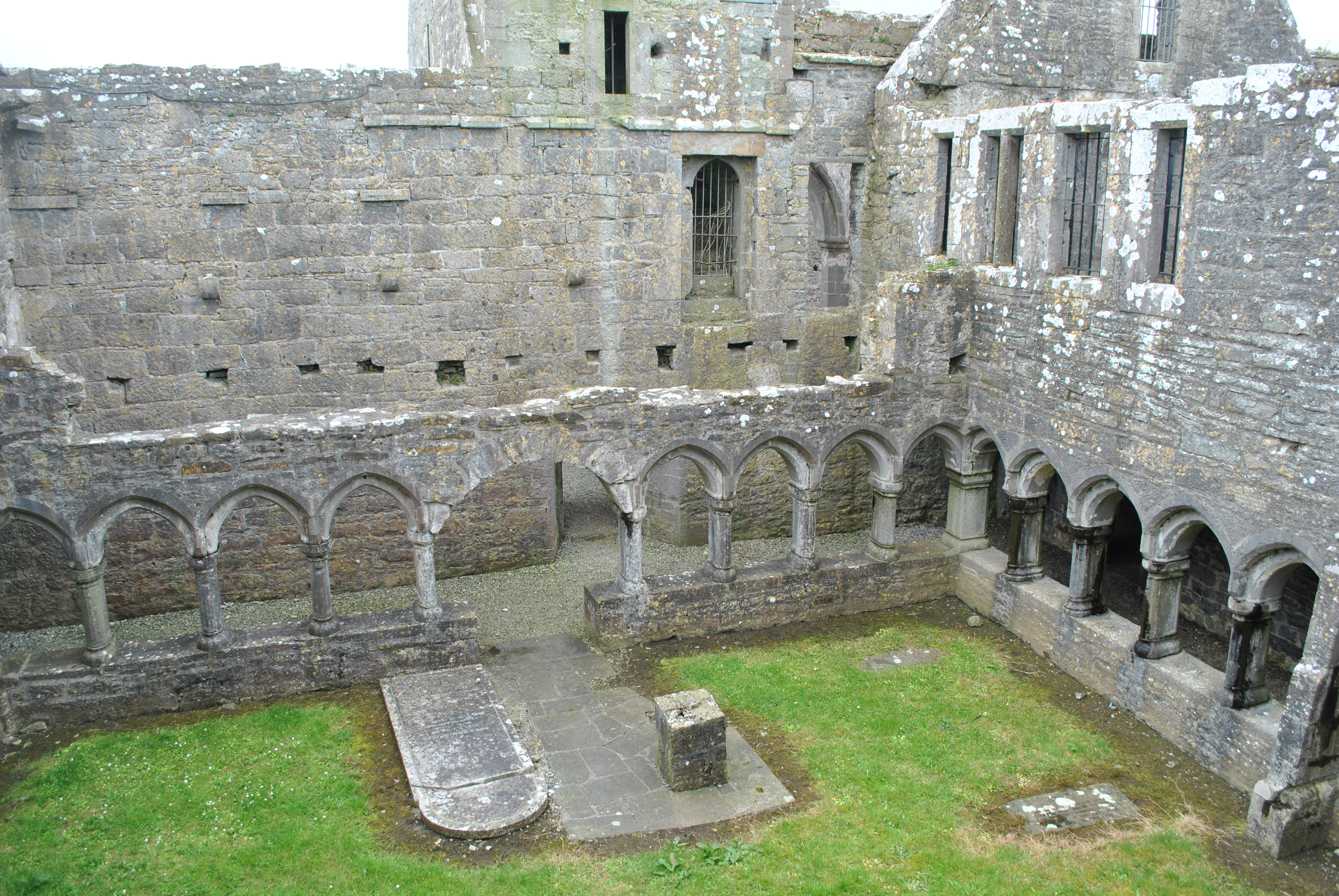

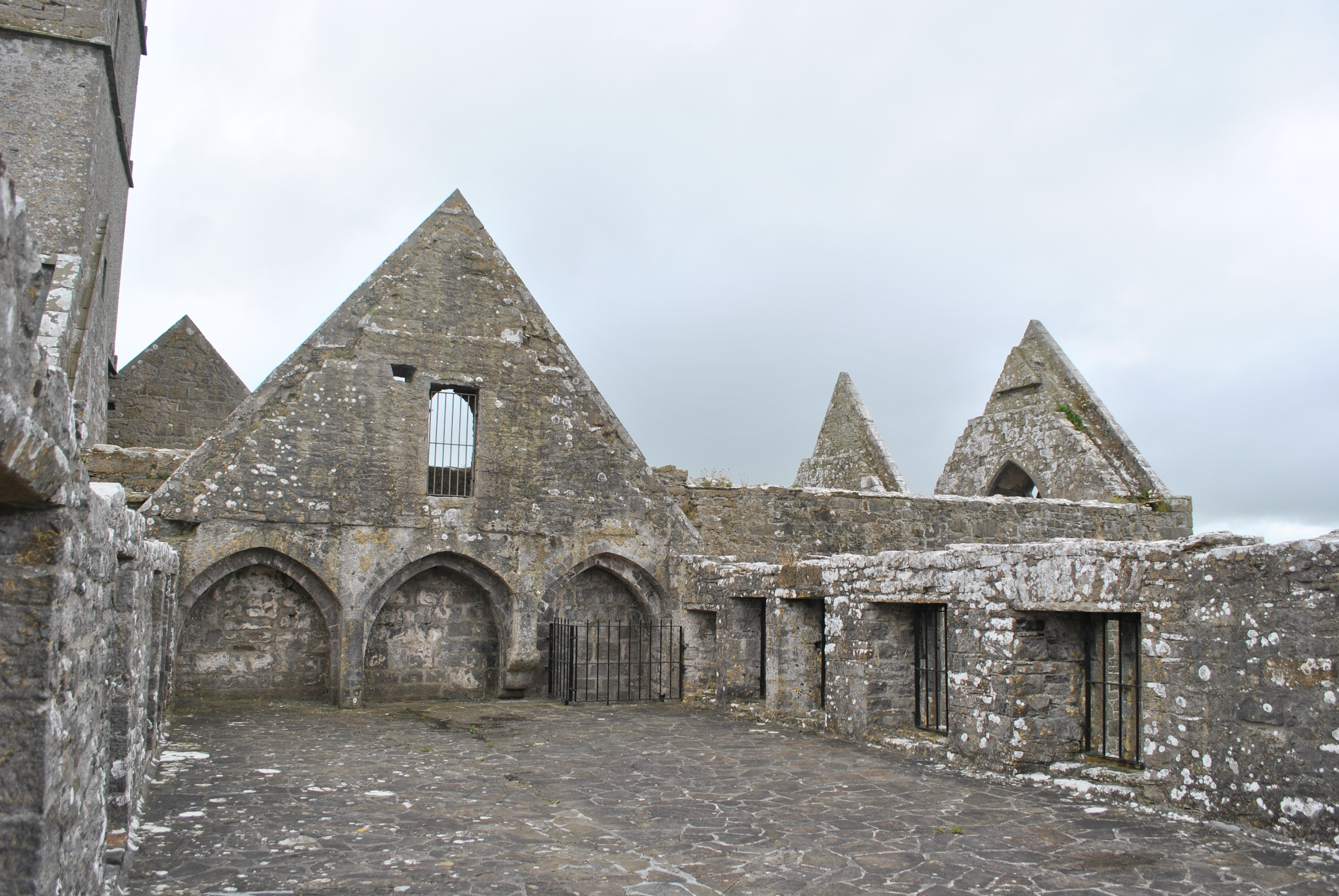

== See also ==
- List of abbeys and priories in Ireland (County Mayo)
