= Des Moines Township, Jackson County, Minnesota =

Des Moines Township, Minnesota
- Township
- Location within the state of Minnesota Des Moines Township, Minnesota (the United States)
- Coordinates: 43°38′9″N 95°1′31″W
- Country: United States
- State: Minnesota
- County: Jackson

Area
  - Total: 32.4 sq mi (83.9 km^{2})
  - Land: 31.7 sq mi (82.2 km^{2})
  - Water: 0.66 sq mi (1.7 km^{2})
- Elevation: 1,404 ft (428 m)

Population (2000)
  - Total: 273
  - Density: 8.5/sq mi (3.3/km^{2})
- Time zone: UTC-6 (Central (CST))
  - Summer (DST): UTC-5 (CDT)
- FIPS code: 27-15769
- GNIS feature ID: 0663970

Des Moines Township is a township in Jackson County, Minnesota, United States. The population was 273 at the 2000 census.

Des Moines Township was organized in 1866, taking its name from the Des Moines River.

== Geography ==
According to the United States Census Bureau, the township has a total area of 32.4 square miles (84 km^{2}), of which 31.7 square miles (82 km^{2}) is land and 0.6 square miles (1.6 km^{2}) (2.01%) is water.

== Demographics ==
As of the census of 2000, there were 273 people, 115 households, and 84 families residing in the township. The population density was 8.6 inhabitants per square mile (3.3/km^{2}). There were 125 housing units at an average density of 3.9 per square mile (1.5/km^{2}). The racial makeup of the township was 100.00% White. Hispanic or Latino of any race were 0.37% of the population.

There were 115 households, out of which 30.4% had children under the age of 18 living with them, 65.2% were married couples living together, 3.5% had a female householder with no husband present, and 26.1% were non-families. 25.2% of all households were made up of individuals, and 11.3% had someone living alone who was 65 years of age or older. The average household size was 2.36 and the average family size was 2.82.

In the township the population was spread out, with 24.9% under the age of 18, 4.4% from 18 to 24, 28.2% from 25 to 44, 23.8% from 45 to 64, and 18.7% who were 65 years of age or older. The median age was 42 years. For every 100 females, there were 118.4 males. For every 100 females age 18 and over, there were 113.5 males.

The median income for a household in the township was $44,167, and the median income for a family was $47,750. Males had a median income of $26,875 versus $19,000 for females. The per capita income for the township was $21,496. About 2.3% of families and 1.1% of the population were below the poverty line, including 1.4% of those under the age of eighteen and none of those 65 or over.

== Politics ==
Des Moines Township is located in Minnesota's 1st congressional district, represented by Mankato educator Tim Walz, a Democrat. At the state level, Des Moines Township is located in Senate District 22, represented by Republican Doug Magnus, and in House District 22B, represented by Republican Rod Hamilton.
