= MV Scantic =

Ship built 1936

History
- Name: Dr Colijn (1936-40); Empire Crocus (1940-47); Stainton (1947-51); Benwood (1951-55); Monica (1955-57); Mona (1957-63); Scantic (1963-64)
- Owner: M Oosterhuis (1936-40); Ministry of War Transport (1940-47); H P Marshall & Co Ltd (1947-51); Mountwood Shipping Co Ltd (1951-55); Rederi AB Henrik Selen (1955-57); N O Olausson (1957-63); J L Hansen (1963-64)
- Operator: M Oosterhuis (1936-40); T H Donking & Sons Ltd (1940-47); H P Marshall & Co Ltd (1947-51); Mountwood Shipping Co Ltd (1951-55); Rederi AB Henrik Selen (1955-57); N O Olausson (1957-63); J L Hansen (1963-64)
- Port of registry: Delfzijl, Netherlands (1936-49); London, United Kingdom (1940-47); (United Kingdom) Middlesbrough (1947-51); (United Kingdom) Liverpool (1951-55); Borgå, Finland (1955-57); Sweden (1957-63); Rønne, Denmark (1963-64)
- Builder: Noord Nederland Scheepsmakkerij
- Yard number: 152
- Launched: 1936
- Out of service: 1964
- Identification: United Kingdom Official Number 167408 (1940-55); Finnish Official Number 482 (1955-57); Code Letters PDSD (1936-40); Code Letters MNDN; (1940-55); Code Letters OFVF (1955-57)
- Fate: Sank

General characteristics
- Tonnage: 322 GRT (1936-40); 341 GRT (1940-55); 349 GRT (1955-57); 327 GRT (1957-63); 326 GRT (1963-64); 154 NRT (1936-40); 142 NRT (1940-55); 141 NRT (1955-57)
- Length: 42.52 m (139 ft 6 in) overall
- Beam: 6.99 m (22 ft 11 in)
- Depth: 2.71 m (8 ft 11 in)
- Propulsion: 6-cylinder MWM Diesel engine
- Complement: 5 (Scantic)

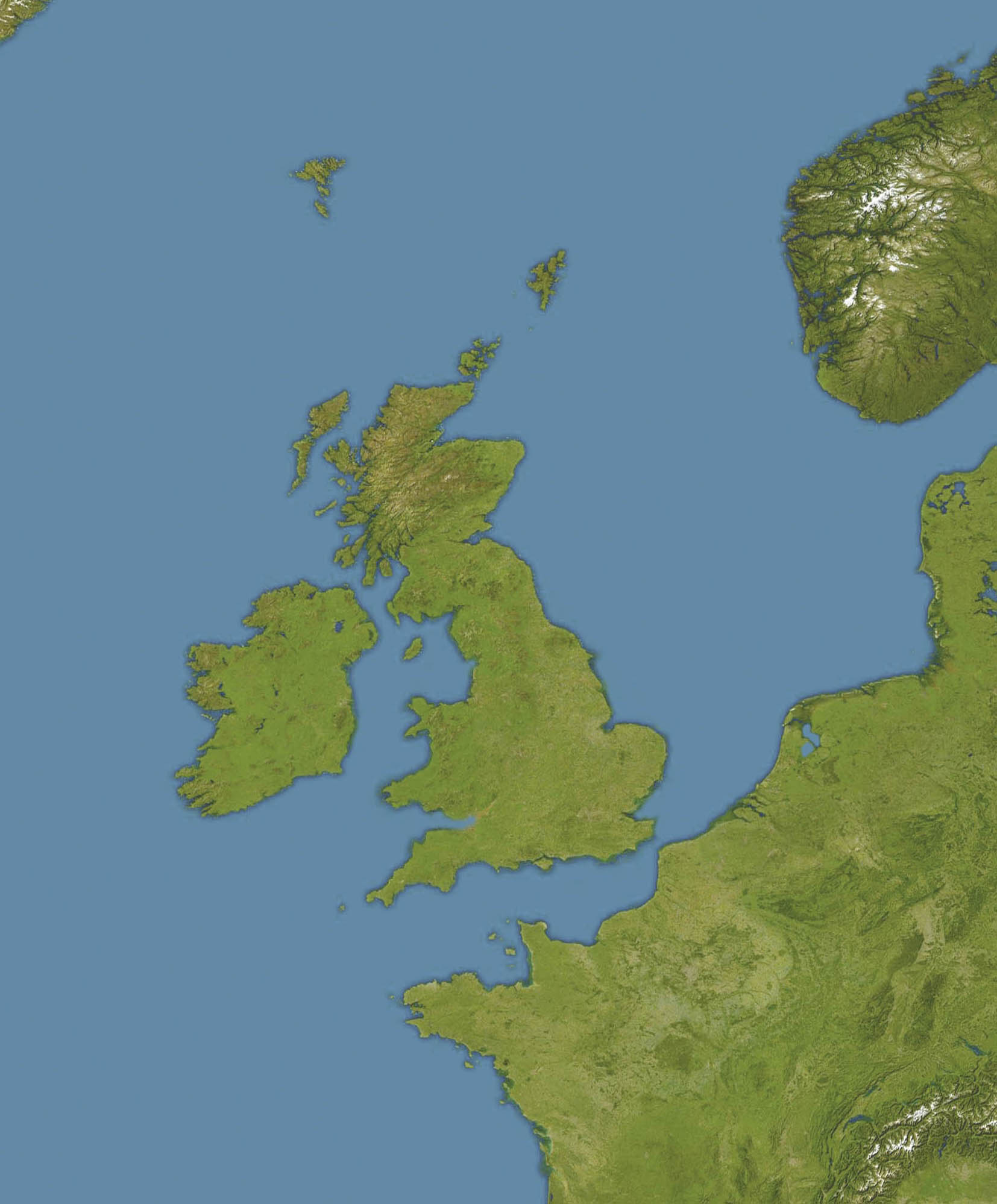
Location of the sinking of Scantic

Scantic was a 326 GRT coaster that was built in 1936 by Noord Nederland Scheepsmakkerij, Groningen as Dr Colijn for a Dutch owner. In 1940, she was transferred to the Ministry of War Transport (MoWT) and renamed Empire Crocus. In 1947, she was sold into merchant service and renamed Stainton. A further sale in 1951 saw her renamed Benwood. In 1955 she was sold to Finland and renamed Monica. A further sale to Sweden in 1957 saw her renamed Mona. In 1963, she was sold to Denmark and renamed Scantic, serving until 7 December 1964 when she foundered in St Georges Channel, United Kingdom.

== Description ==
The ship was built in 1936 by Noord Nederland Scheepsmakkerij, Groningen, Netherlands, As yard number 152.

The ship was 42.52 metres (139 ft 6 in) long, with a beam of 6.99 metres (22 ft 11 in). She had a depth of 2.71 metres (8 ft 11 in). As built, she was assessed at 332 GRT. 154 NRT.

The ship was propelled by a 222 nhp 4-stroke Single Cycle Single Action diesel engine, which had six cylinders of 10 13/16 inches (27.5 cm) diameter by 13 3/4 inches (35 cm) stroke. The engine drove a single screw propeller. It was built by MWM, Mannheim, Germany.

== History ==
Dr Colijn was built for M Oosterhuis, Delfzijl, Netherlands. The Code Letters PDSD were allocated. In 1940, she was transferred to the MoWT and renamed Empire Crocus. She was placed under the management of T H Donking & Sons Ltd. The Official Number 167408 was allocated. Her port of registry was London and the Code Letters MNDN were allocated. Empire Crocus was assessed at 341 GRT, 142 NRT.

Empire Crocus was a member of Convoy OA 208, which departed from Methil, Fife on 2 September 1940 and dispersed at sea on 6 September. In 1941, part of her cargo was advertised to be auctioned as prize. Empire Crocus was a member of Convoy EBC 13, which departed Barry, Glamorgan on 16 June 1944 and arrived at the Seine Bay on 18 June. She left the convoy at Falmouth, Cornwall. On 7 July, she repeated the voyage as a member of Convoy EBC 34. Empire Crocus was a member of Convoy TS 63, which departed Takoradi, Gold Coast on 31 August 1944 and arrived at Freetown, Sierra Leone on 5 September.

In 1947, Empire Crocus was sold to H P Marshall & Co Ltd, Middlesbrough, Yorkshire and renamed Stainton. In 1951, she was sold to Mountwood Shipping Co Ltd, Liverpool and renamed Benwood. On 8 January 1952, Benwood was in distress off Great Orme Head, Caernarvonshire. The Holyhead lifeboat was launched but her assistance was not required. Benwood was escorted into Liverpool, Lancashire by a pilot boat. In 1955, she was sold to Rederei AB Henrik Selen, Borgå, Finland and renamed Monica. The Official Number 482 and Code Letters OFVF were allocated. Monica was assessed as 349 GRT, 141 NRT. In 1957, she was sold to N O Olausson, Sweden and renamed Mona. She was assessed as 327 GRT.

In 1963, Mona was sold to J L Hansen, Rønne, Denmark and was renamed Scantic. She was assessed as 326 GRT. On 7 December 1964, Scantic sprang a leak in St George's Channel, United Kingdom in heavy weather. She was on a voyage from Preston, Lancashire, United Kingdom to Poole, Dorset with a cargo of lime. Water entered the engine department, and a mayday was sent at 16:30. The five crew took to the lifeboat at 17:30, but it capsized. They were all back in the lifeboat by 17:50, when Scantic capsized and sank at 51°10′N 7°15′W. The crew were rescued the next day by Arthur Allbright.
