= Le Moine =

Mountain in Switzerland

- Location within Switzerland

Highest point
- Elevation: 3,566 m (11,699 ft)
- Prominence: 148 m (486 ft)
- Parent peak: Grand Combin
- Coordinates: 45°56′43.8″N 7°16′15.5″E

Geography
- Location: Valais, Switzerland
- Parent range: Pennine Alps

Le Moine is a mountain of the Pennine Alps, situated east of Bourg Saint Pierre in the canton of Valais, Switzerland. It is located on the ridge Les Maisons Blanches in the Grand Combin massif.
