= Des Moines Township, Van Buren County, Iowa =

Township in Van Buren County, Iowa, US

Coordinates: 40°40′N 92°00′W

Des Moines Township is a township in Van Buren County, Iowa, United States.
