= Des Moines Township, Jefferson County, Iowa =

Township in Iowa, US

Coordinates: 40°57′N 92°07′W

Des Moines Township is a township in Jefferson County, Iowa, United States.
