= Des Moines Township, Lee County, Iowa =

Township in Lee County, Iowa, US

Coordinates: 40.50°N 91.54°W

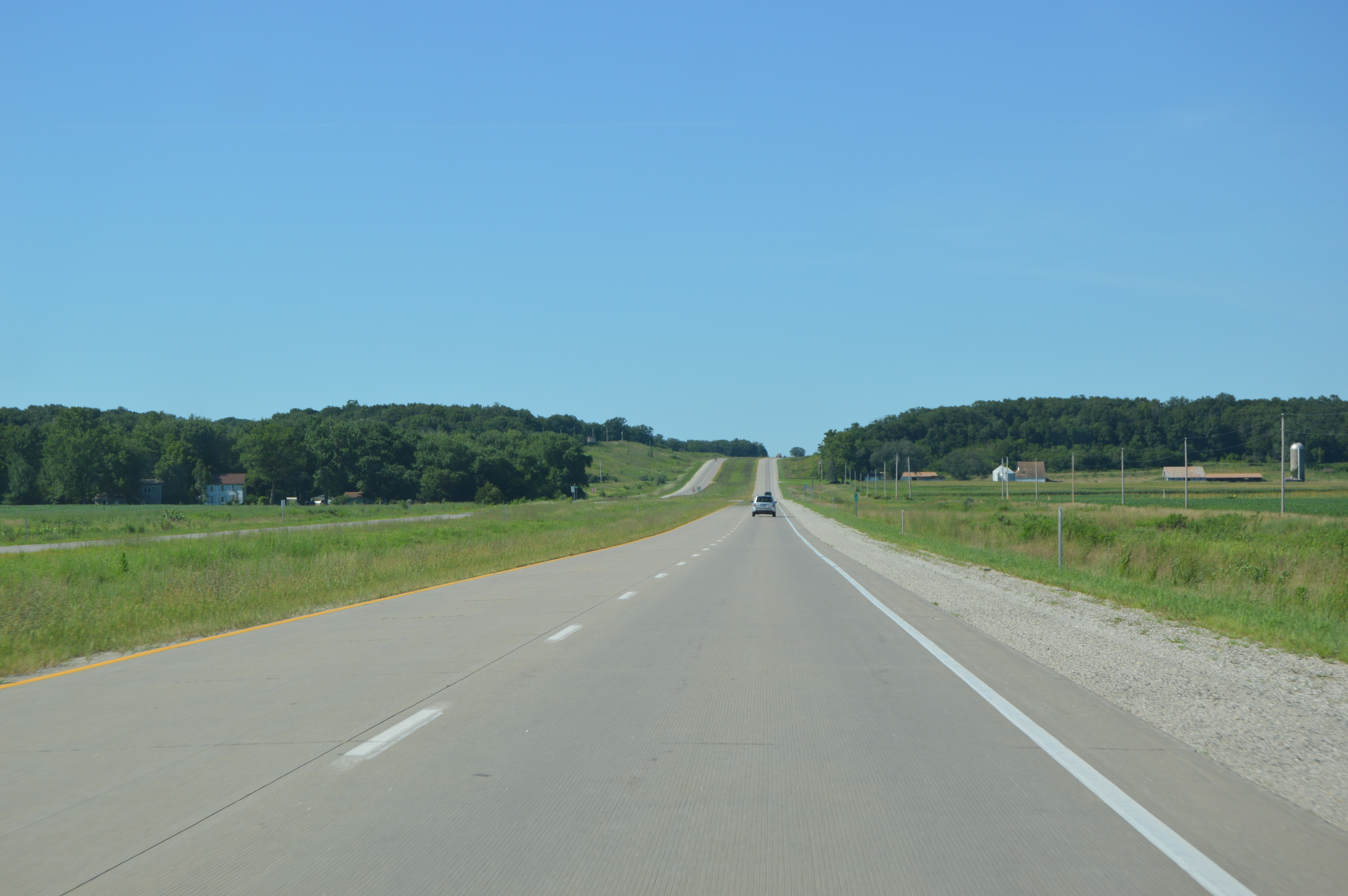
Avenue of the Saints just south of Vincennes

Des Moines Township is a township in Lee County, Iowa.

== History ==
Des Moines Township was originally called Ambrosia Township. Ambrosia Township was organized in 1841, and the name was changed to Des Moines in 1842.
