= Des Moines Township, Jasper County, Iowa =

Township in Jasper County, Iowa, US

Coordinates: 41.5531°N 93.2564°W

Des Moines Township is a township in Jasper County, Iowa, United States.

== History ==
Des Moines Township was established in 1846.
