= Des Moines Township, Pocahontas County, Iowa =

Township in Pocahontas County, Iowa, US

Coordinates: 40.50°N 91.54°W

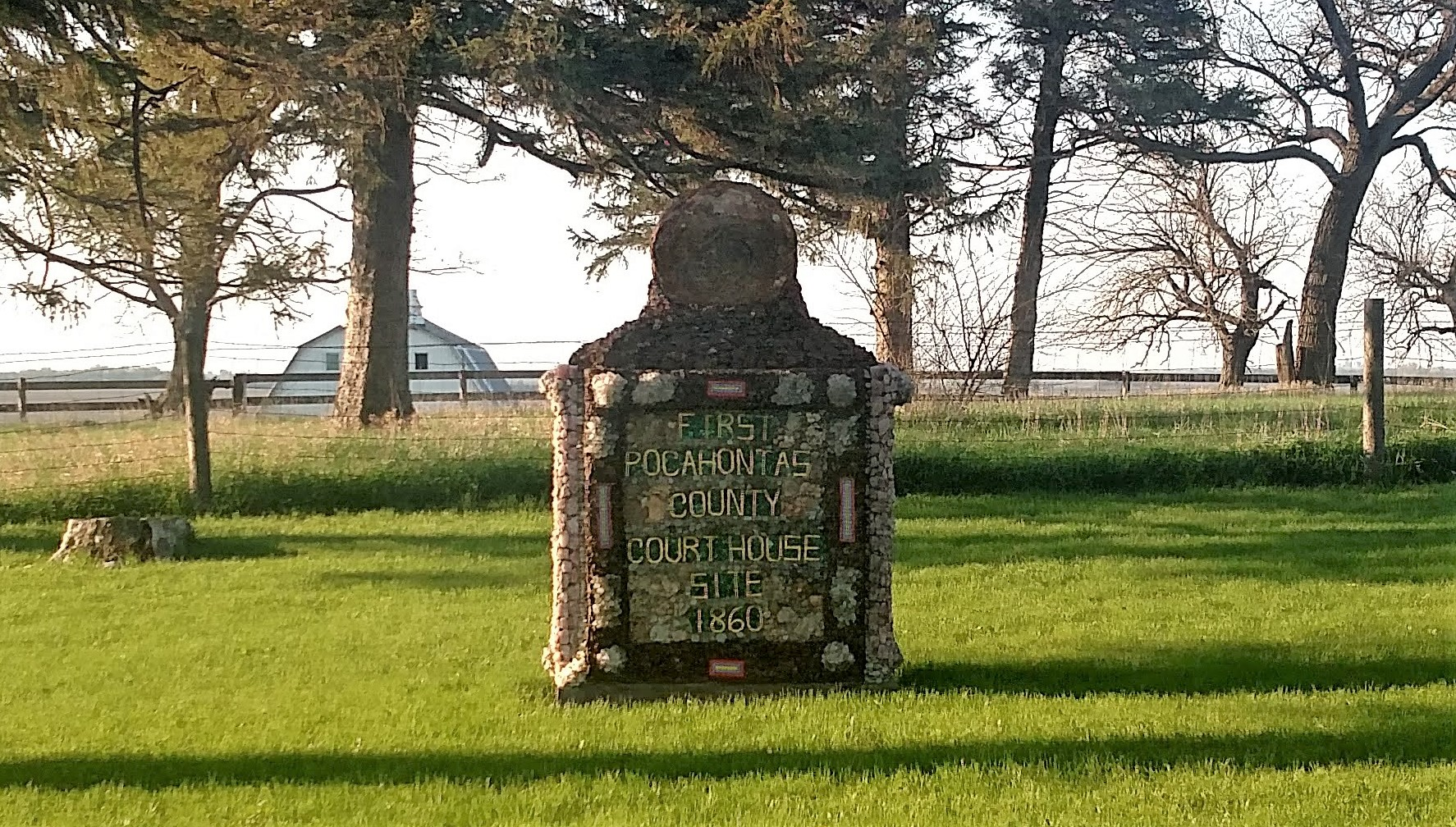
Marker of the original Pocahontas County seat at Old Rolfe

Des Moines Township is a township in Pocahontas County, Iowa, United States.

== History ==
Des Moines Township was organized in 1859. It is named from the Des Moines River that runs through it.
