= Des Moines Township, Dallas County, Iowa =

Des Moines Township
- Township
- Location in Dallas County
- Coordinates: 41°48′57″N 093°52′26″W
- Country: United States
- State: Iowa
- County: Dallas

Area
  - Total: 35.75 sq mi (92.59 km^{2})
  - Land: 33.12 sq mi (85.78 km^{2})
  - Water: 2.63 sq mi (6.81 km^{2}) 7.36%
- Elevation: 1,010 ft (308 m)

Population (2000)
  - Total: 1,730
  - Density: 52/sq mi (20.2/km^{2})
- GNIS feature ID: 0467706

Des Moines Township is a township in Dallas County, Iowa, United States. As of the 2000 census, its population was 1,730.

== Geography ==
Des Moines Township covers an area of 35.75 square miles (92.6 km^{2}) and contains one incorporated settlement, Woodward. According to the USGS, it contains three cemeteries: Robbins Chapel, Snider and Xenia.

The stream of Murphy Branch runs through this township.
