= Des Moines Township, Boone County, Iowa =

Township in Iowa, US

Des Moines Township, Boone County
- Township
- Coordinates: 42°04′40″N 093°52′53″W
- Country: United States
- State: Iowa
- County: Boone

Area
  - Total: 40.44 sq mi (104.73 km^{2})
  - Land: 40.22 sq mi (104.18 km^{2})
  - Water: 0.21 sq mi (0.55 km^{2})
- Elevation: 1,129 ft (344 m)

Population (2000)
  - Total: 13,758
  - Density: 342/sq mi (132.1/km^{2})
- FIPS code: 19-90969
- GNIS feature ID: 0467705

Des Moines Township is one of seventeen townships in Boone County, Iowa, United States. As of the 2000 census, its population was 13,758.

== Geography ==
Des Moines Township covers an area of 40.44 square miles (104.7 km^{2}) and contains one incorporated settlement, Boone. According to the USGS, it contains seven cemeteries: Bass Point, Biblical College, Boone Memorial Garden, Leatham, Linwood Park, Oak Grove and Sacred Heart.
