= Des Moines Township, Polk County, Iowa =

Township in Polk County, Iowa, US

Coordinates: 41°35′32″N 93°39′25″W

Des Moines Township is a township in Polk County, Iowa, United States.

== History ==
Des Moines Township was organized on 26 March 1860.

Its elevation is listed as 942 feet above mean sea level.
