= Quayle =

Quayle is a surname of Anglo–Celtic origin, specifically English, Irish, Manx and Scottish.

When the name originates from Ireland, the Isle of Man or Scotland, it is an Anglicisation of the Gaelic Mac Phàil (Scottish), Mac Pháil (Irish), Mac Phóil (Irish) or Mac Phaayl (Manx) meaning "son of Pàil/Páill/Póil/Paayl". These are Gaelic patronymic forms of the personal name Paul. When originating in Ireland, the name is sometimes a variant of the surname Quill. When of English origin, the surname can be derived from the Old French/Middle English quaille, meaning "quail". In this way, the name would be used as a nickname for a timorous or lecherous person – words that describe this species of bird. The name is recorded in the Isle of Man as MacFayle in 1511 and MacQuayle, Quayle in 1540. The name is recorded in England as Quayle in 1327.

== People ==
=== Acting ===
- Anna Quayle (1932–2019), English actress
- Anthony Quayle (1913–1989), English actor and film director of Manx origin
- John Quayle (actor) (born 1938), English sitcom actor

=== Broadcasting and journalism ===
- Don Quayle (1930–2015), American broadcast journalist, first president of NPR
- Emma Quayle (born 1976), Australian sports journalist
- James C. Quayle (1921–2000), American newspaper publisher
- James Quayle Dealy (1861–1937), British American sociologist, journalist, academic, and newspaper editor
- John Quayle Cannon (1857–1931) American newspaper editor
- Mac Quayle, American composer for film, television, and video games
- Matt Quayle, American television producer, co–creator of CNBC's Squawk Box

=== Politics ===
- Ben Quayle (born 1976), son of Dan Quayle and former U.S. Congressman from Arizona
- Dan Quayle (born 1947), 44th Vice President of the United States
- Edwin Quayle Cannon (1918–2005), grandson of George Q. Cannon and American politician and businessman and prominent leader and missionary in the Church of Jesus Christ of Latter-day Saints
- Fred Quayle (1936–2018), American politician
- Howard Quayle (born 1967), former Chief Minister of the Isle of Man
- John Quayle (politician) (1868–1930), U.S. Congressman
- Marilyn Quayle (born 1949), wife of the Vice President, Second Lady of the United States, and author
- Martyn Quayle (1959–2016), Manx politician
- Noel Quayle Cringle (1937–2021), Manx politician
- Robert Quayle Kermode (1812–1870), Manx-born Australian politician

=== Sport ===
- Anthony Quayle (golfer) (born 1994), Australian professional golfer
- Cam Quayle (born 1972), American former football player
- Charlie Quayle (born 1907), English footballer (New Brighton, Crystal Palace)
- Frank Quayle (born 1947), American former American and Canadian Football player
- John Quayle (rugby league) (born 1947), Australian former professional rugby league footballer
- James Quayle (footballer) (born 1890), English footballer who played only one game (Woolwich Arsenal)
- Mark Quayle (footballer) (born 1978), English footballer
- Samantha Quayle (born 1995), Welsh footballer

=== Other ===
- Ada Quayle (1920–2002), pseudonym of Kathleen Louise Woods, née Robinson, Jamaican novelist and author
- Alan Quayle, British chemist and mass spectrometrist
- Annie Quayle Townend (c. 1845–1914), New Zealand heiress and philanthropist
- Bill Quayle (born 1940), American university professor and athletic director
- Bronte Clucas Quayle (1919–1986), Australian barrister, civil servant, military officer and solicitor
- David Quayle (1936–2010), British businessman, co-founder of B&Q
- Donald Quayle Cannon (born 1936), American retired university professor
- Donald Quayle Innis (1924–1988), son of Mary Quayle Innis and Canadian geographer
- Edward Quayle (1802–1862), Manx merchant navy officer
- Eric Quayle (1921–2001), British bibliophile, collector and author
- Ethel Quayle, British former clinical psychologist
- Francis Quayle (1650–1716), Manx-born Anglican priest in Ireland
- Frank J. Quayle (1892–1971), Fire Commissioner of the City of New York
- George Quayle Cannon (1827–1901), early member of the Quorum of Twelve Apostles of the church of Jesus Christ of Latter-day Saints and U.S. Congressman (Utah Territorial Delegate)
- George Quayle Morris (1874–1962), member of the Quorum of the Twelve Apostles in the Church of Jesus Christ of Latter-day Saints
- Ian Quayle Jones (born 1941), British co-founder and former chairman and chief executive of Quayle Munro merchant bank
- John Quayle (advocate, b. 1693) KC, (1693–1755), Manx lawyer who became the Clerk of the Rolls on the Isle of Man
- John Quayle (judge, born 1725) (1725-1797), son of John Quayle (advocate, b. 1693) and Manx lawyer who became the Clerk of the Rolls on the Isle of Man
- John Quayle-Dickson (1860–1945), Manx military officer
- John Rodney Quayle (1926–2006), British microbial biochemist and Vice Chancellor of University of Bath
- Leo Quayle (1918–2005), South-African Opera Conductor
- Mark Quayle (advocate, b. 1770) KC, (1770–1804), son of John Quayle (judge, born 1725) and Manx lawyer who became the Clerk of the Rolls on the Isle of Man
- Mark Quayle (advocate, b. 1804) QC, (1804–1879), son of Mark Quayle (advocate, b. 1770) and Manx lawyer, antiquarian and philanthropist who became the Clerk of the Rolls on the Ilse of Man
- Mark Quayle (advocate, b. 1841) QC, (1841–1928), son of Mark Quayle (advocate, b. 1804) and Manx advocate and businessman
- Mary Quayle Innis (1899–1972), Canadian novelist, short story writer and author of historical works
- Stephanie Quayle (born 1979), American singer-songwriter and musician
- Sylvester Quayle Cannon (1877–1943), son of George Q. Cannon and American businessman, engineer and religious leader
- Quinton Quayle (born 1955), British diplomat
- Wai Quayle (born 1950), New Zealand Maori Anglican bishop
- William Alfred Quayle (1860–1925), American Methodist bishop
- William Hollingworth Quayle Jones (1854–1925), British colonial judge and administrator and the chief justice of Sierra Leone as well as acting governor of the colony

== Fictional characters ==
- Jonathan Quayle Higgins III, character on Magnum, P.I.
- Lydia Rodarte–Quayle, in the final season of AMC's Breaking Bad

== See also ==
- Ex parte Quayle
- Quail, a variant spelling
- Quaile
- Quill (surname) – in some cases in Ireland Quayle is a variant of this surname
- MacPhail, a surname
