= Quail (disambiguation) =

Quail is a collective name for several genera of mid-sized birds generally considered in the order Galliformes.

Quail may also refer to:

- Common quail, the bird Coturnix coturnix
- Buttonquail, a bird in the family Turnicidae

== Places ==
- Quail, Texas, U.S., a census-designated place
- Quail Mountains, in Death Valley National Park in eastern California, USA
- Quail Run Elementary School, in Contra Costa County, California
- Quail Site in Tuolumne County, California; NRHP-listed
- Quail Valley in Missouri City, Texas

== Military ==
- ADM-20 Quail, an unmanned drone aircraft
- HMS Quail, several ships of the Royal Navy
- KDR Quail or TD4D Quail, an unmanned drone aircraft
- USS Quail (AM-15), a Lapwing-class minesweeper

== People with the surname ==
- Charles E. Quail (1841—1910), American politician
- Paul Quail (1928—2010), British stained-glass artist
- Rebecca Quail (born 1988), Australian bowls player
- Douglas Quail and Kirsten Quail, fictional characters from We Can Remember It for You Wholesale by Philip K. Dick

== People with the first name ==
- Quail Dobbs (1941—2014), American rodeo clown and performer
- Quail Hawkins (1905—2002), American author

== Companies ==
- Dain, Kalman & Quail, American brokerage and investment banking firm, now part of RBC Wealth Management

== See also ==
- Quail Creek (disambiguation)
- Quail Island (disambiguation)
- The Quails, an English band
- The Quails (American band)
- Quayle, a surname
- Denis McQuail, a British communication theorist and professor
- Quail Motorcycle Gathering
- Quail Fire (2020)
- Madonna of the Quail
