= Quaile =

Quaile is a surname. Notable people with the surname include:

- Barbara Quaile (1906–1999), Scottish nurse and midwife
- Elizabeth Quaile (1874–1951), American piano pedagogue of Irish birth
- Mary Quaile (1886–1958), Irish trade unionist

== See also ==
- Quail (disambiguation)
- Quayle
