= Frances Turgeon Wiggin =

American author and composer

- Born: October 4, 1891
- Died: 1985
- Occupations: Author and composer
- Notable work: The State of Maine

Frances Turgeon Wiggin (4 October 1891 – 1985) was an American author and composer who is best remembered for her song “The State of Maine” and publishing five books about Maine composers.

== Life and career ==
Frances Turgeon Wiggin was born in Lewiston, Maine. She studied at Bates, Seneca, and New York colleges, and was a member of William Smith College's charter class (1912), where she received a B.A., and in 1952, an honorary doctorate of humane letters. Her teachers included Anne Neily, Elizabeth Quaille, and Helen Winslow. She composed the music for a William Smith College school song, "Charter Class Waltz." She married Daniel W. Wiggin and they had a daughter, Barbara, in 1922. A few years later, she wrote the words and music to "The State of Maine."

Wiggin was a board member of the Maine Federation of Music Clubs for 50 years, and chaired its Committee for Maine Composers and Their Music for 25 years. She belonged to the Kotzschmar (Organ) Club of Portland (Maine), and was an honorary life member of the Maine Historical Society, the Portland Rossini Club, and the Portland MacDowell Club. In 1976 she received an award from the Maine Historical Society for her contributions to music in Maine. Wiggins' papers are archived at William Smith College.

== Bibliography ==
Wiggin wrote five books about composers from the state of Maine:

- Directory of Maine Composers (1946)
- Biographical Dictionary of Maine Composers (1958)
- Thumbnail Sketches of Maine Composers (with Helen J. Dubbs; 1958)
- Maine Composers and Their Music (1959)
- Maine Composers and Their Music, Book 2 (1976)

== Discography ==
Her compositions include:

=== Chamber ===
- Three Dances (violin, viola, and piano)

=== Piano ===
- Gigue in E

=== Vocal ===
- "Applecumjockaby"
- Bonum Omen (choir)
- Children's Songs (text by Rosetti)
- Five Encore Songs (text by Rosetti)
- "Horseman"
- "House of Dreams"
- "I've Never Been to Winkle" (text by Vilda Owens)
- Little Hand of Pioneers (choir)
- "Love" (text by Charlotte Michaud)
- "Manus Dei" (text by Marguerite Emerson)
- "Pierrot at Fifty" (text by Garrison)
- "Queen Anne's Lace" (text by Mary Newton)
- "Red Geraniums" (text by Elizabeth Dillingham)
- "Someone"
- "Tartary"
- "Who Loves the Rain?"
