= William Gill (sea captain) =

Manx Merchant Navy officer (1795–1858)

Captain William Gill
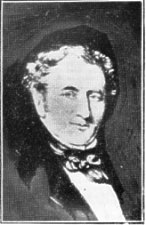
- Capt. William Gill, the first Captain of the line
- Born: 1795; Ramsey, Isle of Man
- Died: 25 January 1858 (aged 62–63); Douglas, Isle of Man
- Occupation: Ship captain
- Employer: Isle of Man Steam Packet Company
- Known for: Successfully charting the Victoria Channel, approach channel to the River Mersey. Also as Captain of RMS Mona's Isle at the beginning of Isle of Man Steam Packet Company operations.
- Spouse: Elizabeth Gill
- Children: Margaret Suzanna Gill

William Gill (1795 – 25 January 1858) was a Manx merchant navy officer who served as commanding officer of numerous Isle of Man Steam Packet Company vessels. Gill was the first recognised captain of the line, retiring with the rank of Commodore.

He is also known as the captain who first charted an approach to the (then) treacherous River Mersey, which subsequently became known as the Victoria Channel.

== Early life ==
William Gill was born in Ramsey, Isle of Man in 1795. Upon finishing his education he was apprenticed to a ship's carpenter, but his ambition was to go to sea.

== Career ==
From 1814 Capt. Gill commanded vessels trading between the Isle of Man, Scotland, England and Ireland. Prior to the introduction of steam, he was Master of the clipper packets which sailed between Douglas and Liverpool. Such vessels he commanded at this time included the Earl St. Vincent, the Douglas, the Mona Castle and the Duchess of Atholl. Captain Gill was generally regarded to have possessed a genial social nature and frank and obliging manner. This rendered him an exceedingly popular officer who proved to be a great favourite with his crew and passengers alike. He was known to the poet T.E. Brown who said of Gill: "He bore the reputation of a fine commander, a true modest gentleman and sailor."

=== Isle of Man Steam Packet Company ===
Captain Gill's reputation led to his appointment as Master of the Isle of Man Steam Packet Company's new steamer Mona's Isle when service commenced in August 1830. At that time the St George Steam Packet Company were the primary operators on the route with their vessel the Sophia Jane under the command of Lieutenant Tudor, RN, but the ship was very unpopular in terms of comfort and reliability. The onus therefore fell upon Capt. Gill and the Mona's Isle to operate an efficient and reliable service, with comfort of the passengers also to be of a high priority. Unlike the Sophia Jane the Mona's Isle had been designed primarily to shelter passengers and had spacious and comfortable cabins.

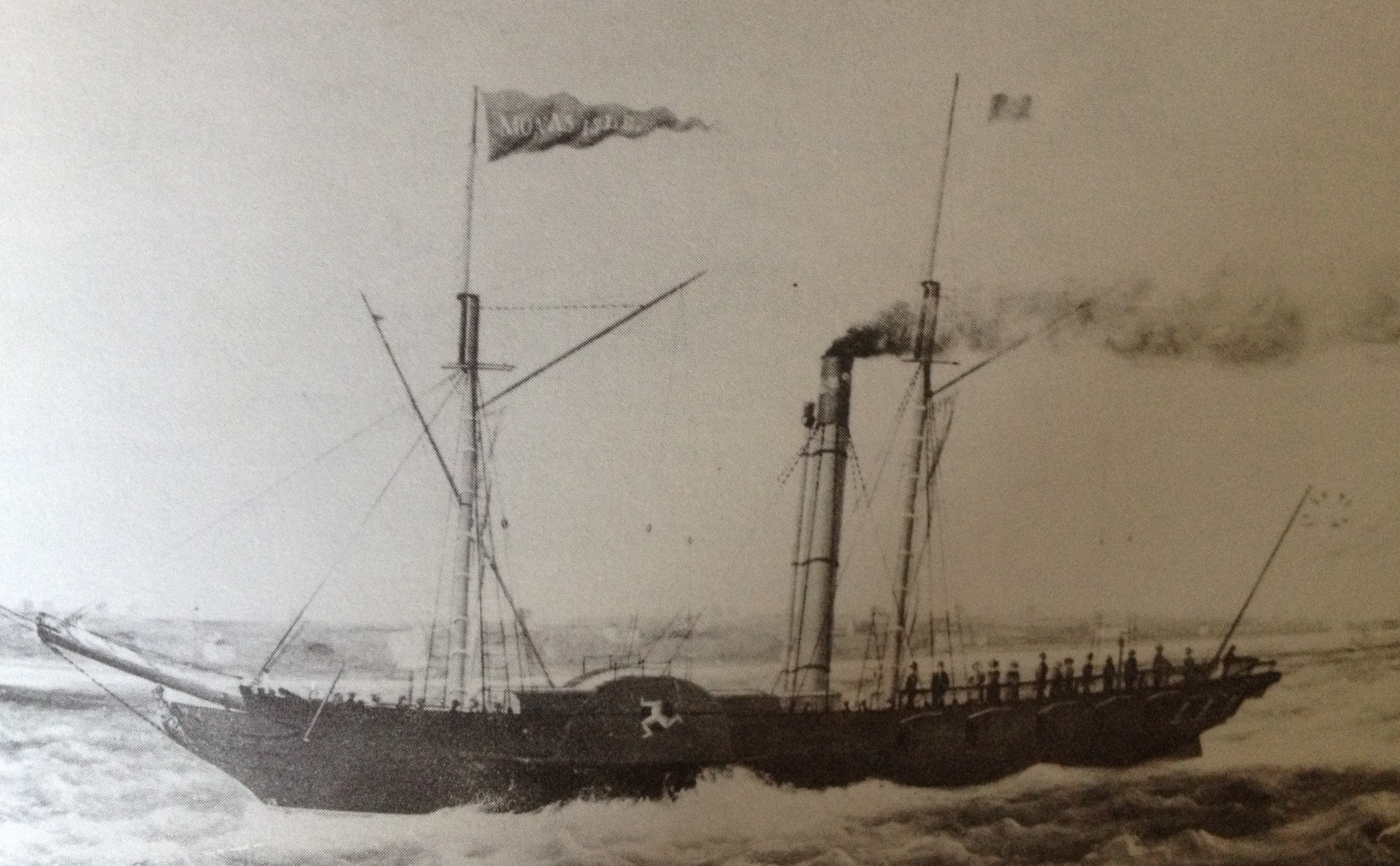
Sketch depiction of Mona's Isle

On Monday, 16 August 1830, Mona's Isle sailed for Liverpool. The Sophia Jane sailed at the same time and reached Liverpool one and a half minutes ahead. On Wednesday, 18 August, another race took place back to Douglas which gave the same result. But on Friday, 20 August, returning from Liverpool, Mona's Isle came in 40 minutes ahead. The pattern was established and Sophia Jane was regularly beaten, on one occasion in a gale, by over three hours.

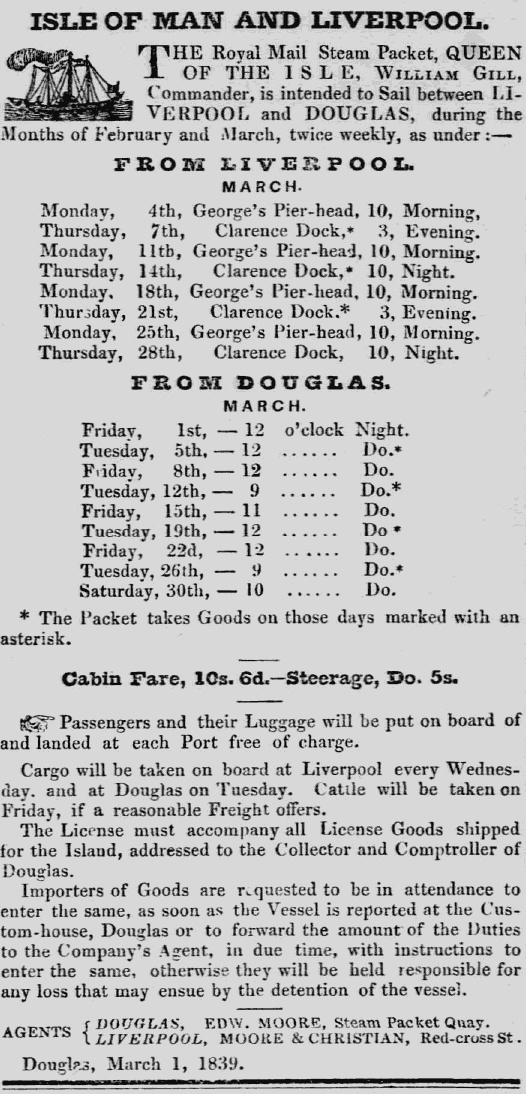
Advert for passage between the Isle of Man and Liverpool on board the Queen of the Isle

The early defeats were probably caused by the fact that Mona's Isle's new engine took time to run in and full speed was not attainable at first. Mona's Isle, however, had proved herself capable of travelling between Liverpool and Douglas in eight hours at a speed of 8.5 knots (15.7 km/h; 9.8 mph).

The St George Company engaged in a price-cutting war, and in September withdrew the Sophia Jane and replaced her with their largest and fastest steamer, the St. George. However, Mona's Isle won the first race largely because of the astuteness of Capt. Gill. Seeing a south-westerly gale developing, he had the coal and cargo moved to the windward side of the vessel, to prevent the windward paddle lifting out of the water.

By October 1830, Mona's Isle had established herself as the principle steamer between Liverpool and Douglas.

On Friday 19 November 1830, under the command of Lieutenant John Tudor RN, the St George arrived in Douglas from Liverpool with mail and passengers. Once her passengers and mail were unloaded, the St George proceeded to take her anchorage in the vicinity of Conister Rock using the fixed chain cable which had been secured for the task. The night was stormy, with strong gusts of wind from the southwest which increased in ferocity as the wind veered to the southeast on the morning of 20 November. At 05:00hrs the chain cable holding the St George started to give way and she began to drive in between the Pollock and Conister rocks. Through the efforts of Sir William Hillary, founder of the Royal National Lifeboat Institution, the crew of the St. George were saved. Capt. Gill on seeing the predicament of the St George was able to break away from his mooring and put to sea, thus avoiding a similar fate.

By 1832 the Directors of the Isle of Man Steam Packet Company were becoming increasingly concerned about using the Mona's Isle in winter weather. A second vessel, the Mona, was ordered to meet this task and entered service initially serving Whitehaven before replacing the Mona's Isle on the main Liverpool service in October of that year.

By this time, after seeing off the competition of the St. George Company, the Isle of Man Steam Packet Company had achieved the first reliable steamship service between the Isle of Man and Liverpool and consequently further ships were ordered for service with the line, with Capt. Gill raising to the rank of Commodore and taking initial command of each new vessel in turn.

The Mona was followed by the much larger and more powerful Queen of the Isle in 1834, the King Orry in 1842, the Ben-my-Chree in 1845 and the Tynwald in 1846 which was to be Capt. Gill's final command.

Captain Gill's understanding of the winds, currents and tides between the Isle of Man and Liverpool was of particular renown and he gained a reputation as a fearless and daring commander and ultimately one of the most successful, rarely known to turn back in heavy weather. It was said that he had on several occasions left the Port of Liverpool when no other commander would, and that during his time at sea not one single life was lost from any vessel placed under his charge.

However, in 1835 he was dismissed by the directors of the Isle of Man Steam Packet Company for refusing to go to sea when his brother was dying. The Company's shareholders however would not accept his dismissal and after holding a meeting to investigate the matter he was re-instated as a Master within the Company. The shareholders went further and sacked the directors whom they accused of "injudicious management of the Company's affairs."

The dismissed directors sought to establish a rival shipping company to the Isle of Man Steam Packet and acquired a 300-ton steamer which they named Monarch.

With the Monarch set against the Queen of the Isle a new series of races on the Douglas - Liverpool route commenced, and as was the case with the St George Company the competition was seen off by the Isle of Man Steam Packet Company. In 1847 the Monarch Company went into liquidation and their vessel was sold.

On Friday 31 January 1840 Captain Gill was presented with an award of five guineas together with a vote of thanks (with a further five guineas distributed amongst the crew of the Mona's Isle) by the Liverpool Shipwreck and Humane Society in recognition for their part in the rescue of the crew of the barque Corsair. The Corsair had run aground on the Jordan Flats in the Mersey Estuary, thereby placing her crew in considerable peril. On seeing the distress signal being flown from the Rock Fort at New Brighton, Capt. Gill was able to take the lifeboat Magazine in tow, placing her to the windward of the Corsair thus enabling the crew of the lifeboat to perform the rescue.

== Charting the Victoria Channel ==
Captain Gill, as the discoverer of the Victoria Channel, has rendered essential service to the port of Liverpool, and has claims on our merchants and shipowners.

— Liverpool Mercury. April 17th. 1852.

Whilst a channel had existed for the navigation of ships into the Port of Liverpool, this channel, the Rock Channel, was only available for use at high tides and therefore vessels could wait many hours at anchor before being able to enter the port.

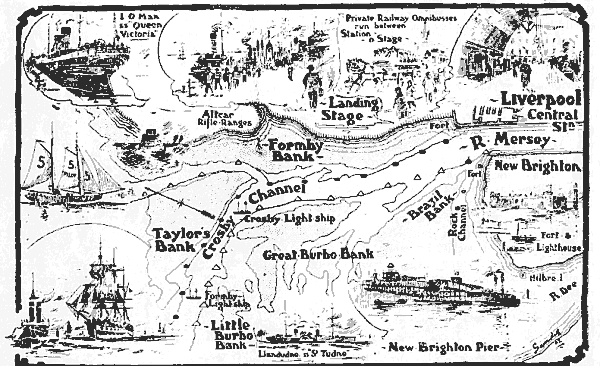
Illustration depicting Liverpool Bay and the approaches to the River Mersey.

With the increasing commercial trade into and out of Liverpool coming with the advent of the steamship, various attempts were made to chart a safe navigable channel through the south eastern portion of Liverpool Bay and into the River Mersey at all states of the tide. According to a crew member of Capt. Gill's, John Bell, who began his service as a deck boy on the Queen of the Isle in 1836, the task was something which Capt. Gill went about in a meticulous way. Bell is recorded as saying that Capt. Gill would be always taking various bearings from his positions to places on the shore, such as the Leasowe Castle and the Beacon on Bidston Hill. A record of the depth of the water at various states of the tide was found by two sailors, one port and one starboard using a lead line, and this would be logged by Capt. Gill. Another part of the arduous task would require Capt. Gill to lower his anchor some two or three feet below the draught of his steamer and, dragging this with him, let it go when he got nearly ashore on a sand-bank. It was in this way that he was able to discover the channel which was to make the modern shipping fortunes of Liverpool.

=== Presentation ===
On the occasion of Capt. Gill's retirement, a complete solid silver breakfast and tea service was presented to him at a function held in his honour at the Castle Mona, Douglas, Isle of Man on Wednesday June 16, 1852.

The meal was manufactured by Joseph Mayer of Liverpool, and which consisted of a full-sized coffee-pot, tea pot, sugar basin and cream jug; a silver chased toast rack, four very richly-chased candlesticks, a silver butter cooler with cover and stand, 12 silver teaspoons, sugar tongs and two elegant butter knives.

In addition Capt. Gill also received a purse of 100 sovereigns. On the top of the coffee and tea pots were two emblems, one representing that for the sailing vessels, being formed of a rudder, sail, and block grouped together, the other consisting of a large paddle wheel, funnel and steering-wheel. On the coffee pot was inscribed, under the figure of a yacht, the names of the sailing vessels commanded by Captain Gill, and under a steam vessel the names of the Mona's Isle, Queen of the Isle, King Orry, Ben-my-Chree and Tynwald, the steamers which had been under his charge. In addition to the silver articles there were three handsome papier mache waiters and a complete service of china in white and rich gold. The silver article, had the initials W. G. upon them, with the principal inscription "To Captain William Gill, the discoverer of the Victoria Channel into Liverpool." In this manner, therefore, did Liverpool express gratitude for the new Channel.

== Retirement ==
Captain Gill retired from the Isle of Man Steam Packet Company in 1852. Through public subscription he received a silver inscribed plate commemorating his charting of the Victoria Channel and a purse of 100 guineas. However, he sustained the loss of a large proportion of his wealth following the failure of Joint Stock Bank and the Bank of Messrs Holmes, but is recorded as still having retired in a comfortable manner.

Having only recently retired he was enticed back to sea the following year to assist in the establishment of a small shipping line in his native Ramsey. The company had built a steamer which they called the Manx Fairy and Capt. Gill, at the special request of the shareholders, took command of her on her first trip "in order that her steaming and sailing qualifications might be fairly tried under a commander of such great experience of coasting steam navigation." This was to be Capt. Gill's last triumph, the Manx Fairy steaming out of Liverpool at the same time as the Isle of Man Steam Packet's new flag ship Mona's Queen, which she beat to Douglas by 8 minutes in a passage time of 5 hours 30 minutes.

== Death ==
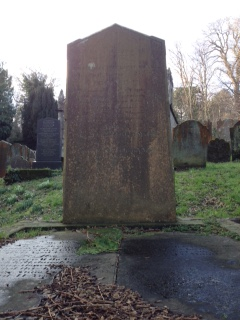
Capt. Gill's grave, Kirk Braddan Cemetery, Isle of Man.

It was said that for the last two years of his life Capt. Gill was constantly indoors, and although it is said that he continued to enjoy the company of close friends he avoided local society. He also was said to have been badly affected by the loss of his wife, Elizabeth, which was then followed by the loss of his only child, a daughter, Margaret.

Captain William Gill died aged 63 at his home in Harris Terrace, Douglas, on 25 January 1858. His body was interred with that of his wife and daughter at Braddan Parish Cemetery. In 1930 when the Isle of Man Steam Packet Company celebrated its centenary his grave was reconditioned by the Company.
