= Edward Quayle =

Captain Edward Quayle
- Born: 1802; Isle of Man
- Died: 14 June 1862 (aged 59–60); Douglas, Isle of Man
- Occupation: Ship captain
- Employer: Isle of Man Steam Packet Company
- Known for: Recipient of various awards by the National Institution for the Preservation of Life from Shipwreck, Lloyd's of London and the Royal Humane Society. Also as captain of various Isle of Man Steam Packet Company ships at the beginning of operations.

Edward Quayle (1802 – 14 June 1862) was a Manx merchant navy officer who served as commanding officer of numerous Isle of Man Steam Packet Company vessels. Quayle was amongst the first captains of the line, retiring with the rank of Commodore. Captain Quayle was said to have been a thorough seafarer and an attentive and warm-hearted man.

== Early life ==
Edward Quayle was born on the Isle of Man in 1802.

== Career ==
For a number of years prior to the introduction of the steamship, Capt. Quayle was Master of the clipper packets which sailed on the mail run between Douglas and Liverpool his final command prior to him joining the Isle of Man Steam Packet Company was that of the barque Eleanor.

=== Isle of Man Steam Packet Company ===
Captain Quayle's reputation led to his appointment as Master of the Mona on 5 October 1833, and subsequently as the company continued to grow he succeeded Captain William Gill in taking command of the Mona's Isle. In turn Capt. Quayle commanded all of the company's steamers from the early 1830s onwards, gaining a high reputation amongst his passengers and crew.

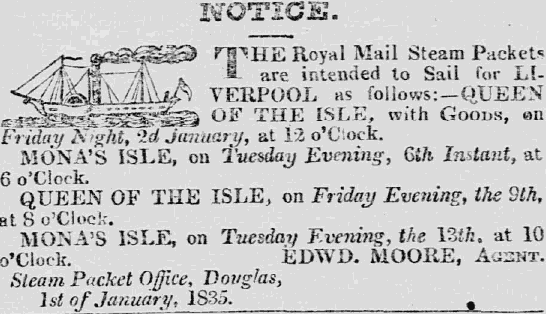
Timetable for the winter service, January 1835, concerning the sailings of the Queen of the Isle and the Mona's Isle.

His early command of the Mona saw him undertake the winter role, that is the continuation of the link between Douglas and Liverpool through the winter months, a hazardous undertaking in a small ship of 150 tons, battling the numerous winter storms of the Irish Sea.

On 25 March 1835, under the command of Capt. Quayle, the Queen of the Isle was involved in a collision with the Irishman in the Mersey Estuary. On 26 July 1839, Mona's Isle rescued the crew of Nancy, which was wrecked on the Pollock Rocks, in Douglas Bay. Quayle was awarded a silver medal by Lloyd's of London for his actions.

Following Capt. Gill's retirement from the Isle of Man Steam Packet Company in 1852, Capt. Quayle succeeded him as Commodore of the line. His final command was that of the Douglas.

== Retirement ==
In July 1860, as a consequence of failing health and of injuries received during rough weather in service, Capt. Quayle retired from the command of the Douglas. However he still continued in the service of the IOMSPCo on land.

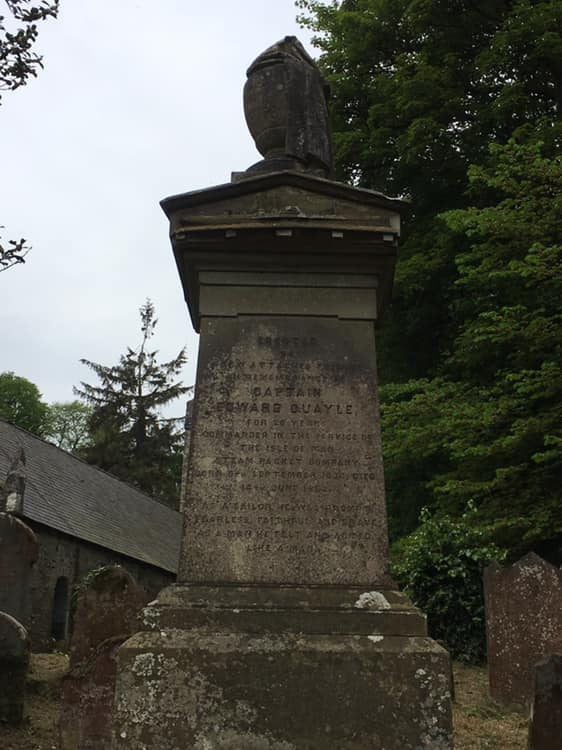
Captain Edward Quayle's grave.

== Death ==
From the time of Capt. Quayle's retirement his health continued to decline. He died at his home on Prospect Hill, Douglas, Isle of Man, on Saturday 14 June 1862.

Capt. Quayle's funeral was reported to have been very well attended with numerous Steam Packet directors in attendance. The service was conducted by the Reverend William Drury, after which his body was interred at Braddan Parish Cemetery.

== Awards ==
=== Pollock Rocks Rescue ===
In 1841 Capt. Edward Quayle received awards from Lloyd's of London and the Royal Humane Society for rescuing the crew of a vessel which were stranded on the Pollock Rocks, Douglas Bay, during an easterly gale.

On the night of Saturday 6 February, a smack named New Volunteer was making its way into Douglas Harbour in challenging conditions, having made passage from Whitehaven. Laden with a cargo of coal, freestone and gunpowder she struck upon the bar at the harbour entrance during which the tiller in the rudder head was broken resulting in the ship being driven onto the Pollock Rocks - a jagged crop of rocks situated on the northern side of Douglas Harbour. Capt. Quayle led the rescue in the first of several small boats which made their way to the rocks, successfully taking off all the crew members.

In addition to the awards bestowed on him by Lloyd's of London and the Royal Humane Society, and on the recommendation of Sir William Hillary, Capt. Quayle was awarded a Silver Medal on behalf of the National Institution for the Preservation of Life from Shipwreck - the second time that particular award had been bestowed on him.
