= Ernest Sykes =

Ernest Sykes may refer to:

- Ernest Sykes (VC) (1885–1949), English recipient of the Victoria Cross
- Ernest Ruthven Sykes (1867–1954), British malacologist
- Ernest Sykes (cricketer) (1869–1925), English cricketer
- Ernie Sykes (1915–1997), English footballer
- Ernest Eugene Sykes (1867–1942), New Orleans businessman and Freemason
