= Senator Bristow =

Senator Bristow may refer to:

- Benjamin Bristow (1832–1896), Member of the Kentucky Senate from 1863 to 1865
- Joseph L. Bristow (1861–1944), Member of the U.S. Senate representing Kansas from 1909 to 1915
