= Angela Diller =

American pianist and music educator

- Born: 1 August 1877; Brooklyn, New York, United States
- Died: 1 May 1968 (aged 90); Stamford, Connecticut, United States
- Occupation: Music educator

Angela Diller (August 1, 1877 – May 1, 1968) was a pianist, composer, and music educator.

== Early life and education ==
Mary Angela Diller was born on August 1, 1877, to William Augustus Muhlenberg Diller and Mary Abigail Welles. She was the youngest of four children. Diller taught herself how to play the piano at an early age. Her older sister Ellen taught her how to read sheet music. As a teenager, she received lessons from Alice Fowler between 1892 and 1895.

== Career ==
In 1899, she founded the Diller-Quaile Institute with Elizabeth Quaile. Diller and Quaile wanted books for the teachers at the school and wrote the Diller-Quaile Series. She was awarded a prestigious MacDowell Fellowship in music composition, and was in residence at the artist's colony in 1931. In 1932 and 1937 respectively, she wrote The Story of Wagner's Lohengrin, and The Story of Verdi's Aïda. Both books, published by G. Schirmer, contained musical excerpts with printed music. In 1941, Diller retired from managing the school.

== Personal life ==
Diller was raised an Episcopalian and was influenced by New Thought. She never married and had no children.

== Death ==
Near the end of her life, she lived in the Courtland Gardens Health Center in Stamford, Connecticut. Her funeral was held by her nieces and nephews.
