= Bristow, Missouri =

Unincorporated community in Missouri, U.S.

Coordinates: 37°48′18″N 94°15′52″W

Bristow is an unincorporated community in Vernon County, in the U.S. state of Missouri.

== History ==
A post office called Bristow was established in 1897, and remained in operation until 1901. The community has the name of Joseph L. Bristow, a postal official and afterward U.S. Senator from Kansas.
