= SS Mona's Isle (1830) =

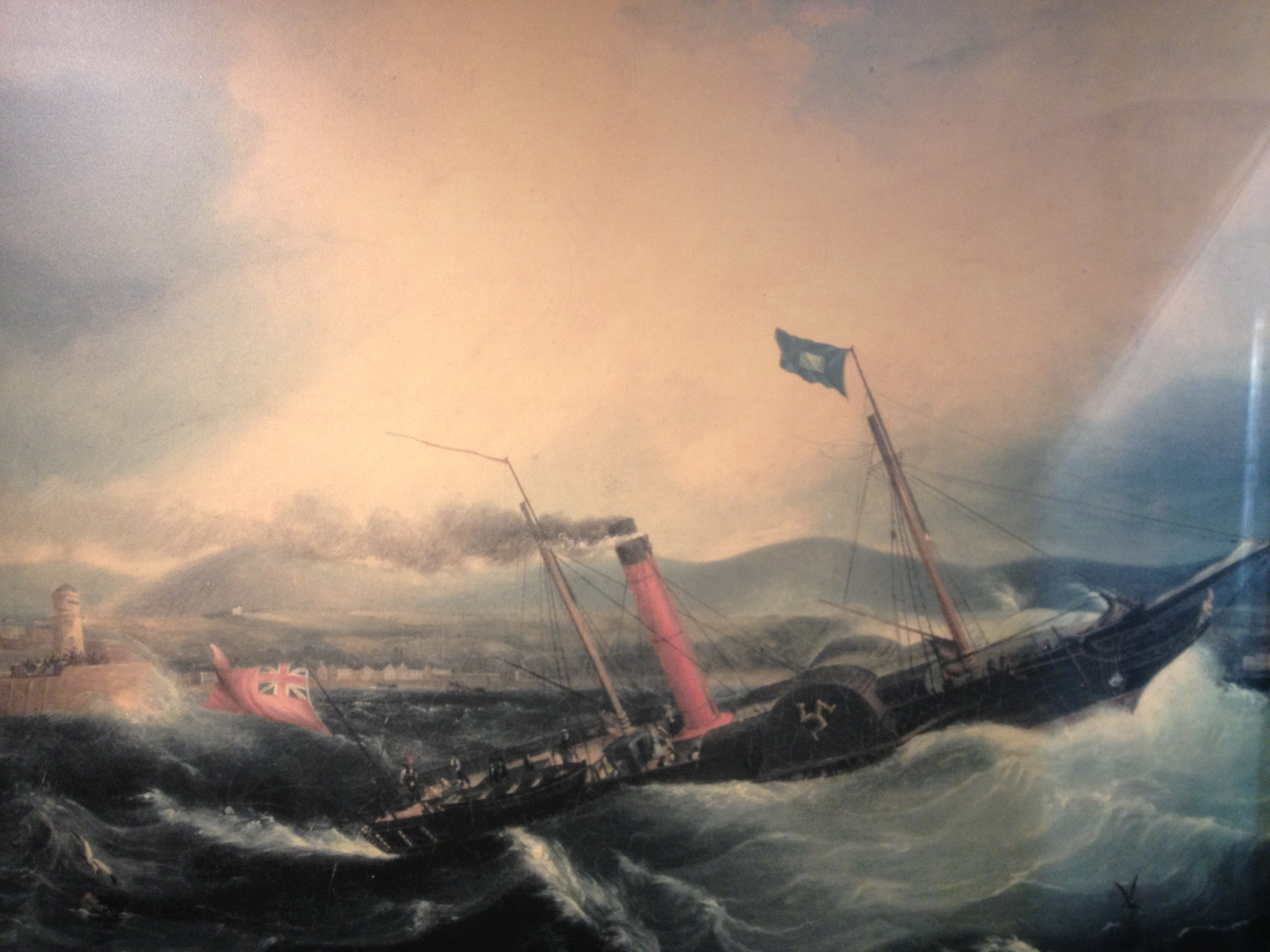
- Mona's Isle

History

Isle of Man
- Name: Mona’s Isle
- Owner: 1830–1851: IOMSPCo.
- Operator: 1830–1851: IOMSPCo.
- Port of registry: (United Kingdom of Great Britain and Ireland) Douglas, Isle of Man
- Builder: John Wood & Co., Glasgow.
- Cost: £7,052
- Launched: 30 June 1830
- Out of service: 1851
- Fate: Scrapped by Robert Napier & Co., Glasgow.

General characteristics
- Type: Paddle Steamer
- Tonnage: 200 gross register tons (GRT)
- Length: 116 feet (35 m)
- Beam: 19 feet (5.8 m)
- Depth: 10 feet (3.0 m)
- Ice class: N/A
- Installed power: 100 shp (75 kW)
- Propulsion: Napier Side Lever Engine. Working at 15 pounds per square inch (100 kPa), developing 100 shp (75 kW) driving twin Paddle wheels
- Speed: 8.5 knots (15.7 km/h; 9.8 mph)
- Capacity: 325 passengers
- Crew: 16

SS (RMS) Mona's Isle (I) was the first vessel ordered for service with the Isle of Man Steam Packet Company when it began its operation in 1830. No Official number is recorded for the vessel, as formal registration was not introduced until the Merchant Shipping Act 1854.

== Dimensions ==
Mona's Isle was a wooden paddle-steamer designed and built by John Wood & Co., Glasgow. She had no official yard number. Mona's Isle was launched by James Wood on Wednesday, 30 June 1830. She had a registered tonnage of 200 GRT; length 116 ft 0 in (35.4 m); beam 19 ft 0 in (5.8 m); depth 10 ft 0 in (3.0 m); speed 8.5 knots (15.7 km/h; 9.8 mph).

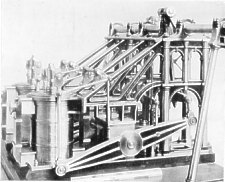
Side Lever Napier Engine as fitted to Mona's Isle

Her engine and boiler were by Robert Napier & Co., Glasgow, and attracted considerable attention as Napier's work was considered to be very advanced for its day. The boiler produced a steam pressure of 15 pounds per square inch (100 kPa), and the engine was one of the earliest examples of the side-lever type. It was really the familiar beam engine of the time, adapted for marine use.

Mona's Isle had bunker capacity for 35 tons of coal.

This design of side-lever engine became the most popular type of engine for marine purposes, and was adapted for use in oceangoing vessels until 1850.

== Appearance ==
Considered both fast and handsome, Mona's Isle was schooner rigged with a standing bowsprit. She was square sterned, carvel built, carried a female figurehead and her Mainmast stood at 70 feet (21 m).

She had a tall funnel amidships (standing at 56 feet (17 m) with a circumference of 12 feet (3.7 m)), and the Three Legs of Man was displayed on her paddle boxes. A further design feature, was her long bowsprit and clipper bow.

== Service life ==
Unlike previous ships which served the Isle of Man, Mona's Isle was not constructed primarily to carry cargo, and was very well appointed for the carriage of passengers.

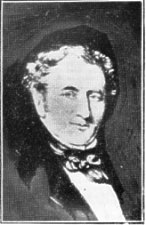
Capt. William Gill, the first Captain of the line.

Under the command of Capt. William Gill, Mona's Isle entered service with the Company upon her completion in 1830, and quickly established the Manx company's superiority over the rival St George Company, whose ships Prince Llewelyn and St David were much despised by the Manx public.

The Mona's Isle, as opposed to the St. George Company's ships, had been designed to shelter passengers, and had spacious and comfortable cabins.

Mona's Isle arrived in Douglas on Saturday 14 August 1830, and was christened by Mrs. J. C. Crellin. Her arrival was celebrated by the Manks Advertiser in which she was described thus:-

"As beautiful a vessel as ever appeared in this part. Her accommodations are, if possible, more than equal to her appearance."

— Manks Advertiser. Monday 16 August 1830.

A Greenock newspaper of the day was slightly less complimentary, merely describing her as:-

"A superior steam vessel propelled by two engines of superior power."

— The Isle of Man Steam Packet Co. Limited. 1830 - 1904. By A. W. MOORE, C.V.O., M.A. (1904, p15).

Mona's Isle was used for a variety of work. Her first trip was to the Menai Bridge on 15 August; a week later she ran an excursion to Bangor, North Wales; advertised as:-

" The Mona's Isle will sail with passengers at 9 a.m. returning the following day at 2 p.m. Fare £1 return."

— Manks Advertiser. Friday 20 August 1830.

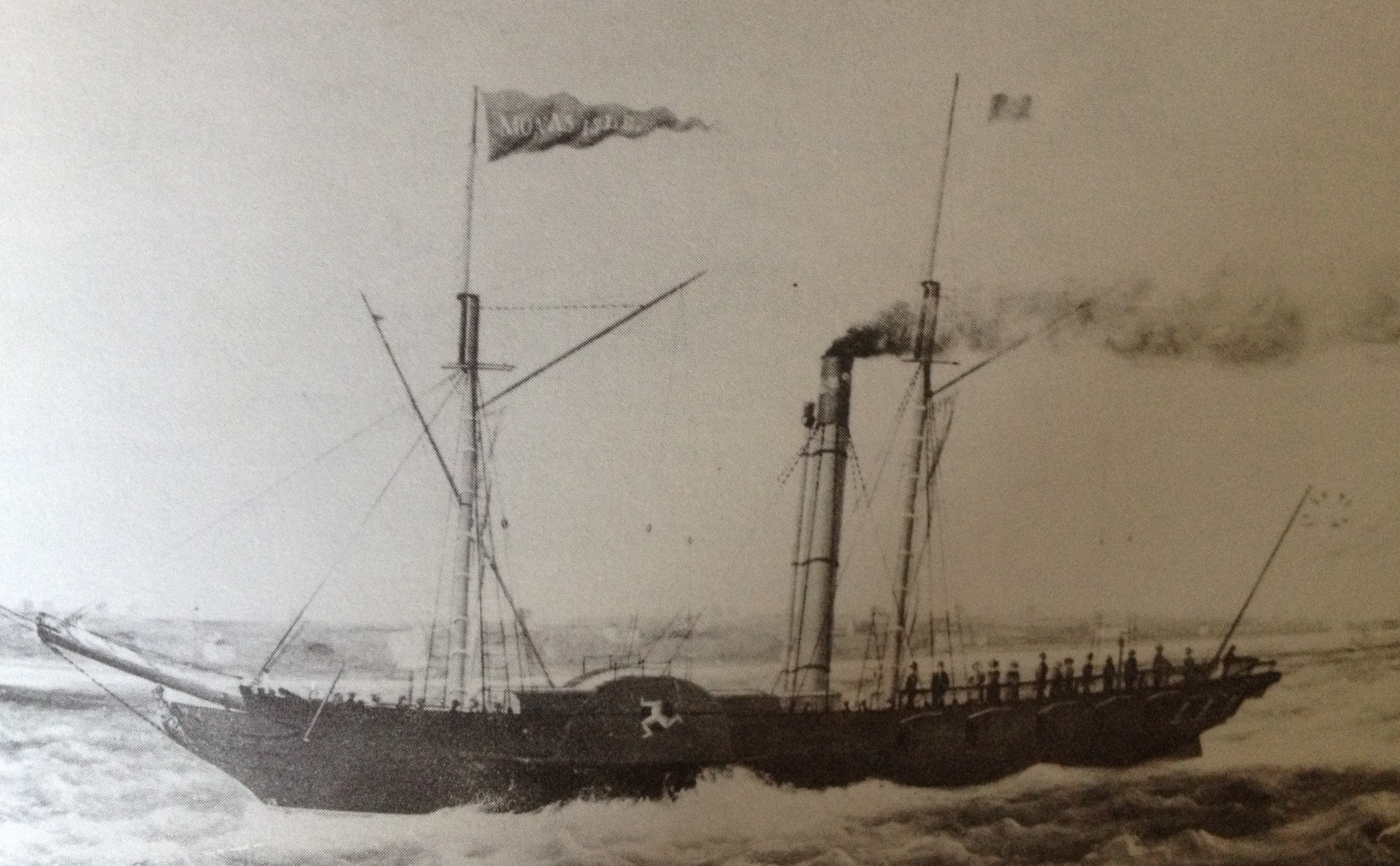
Sketch depiction of Mona's Isle (artist unknown).

The major task of Mona's Isle however, was to open the Liverpool - Douglas service for the Steam Packet Company, and to beat the opposition. On Monday 16 August Mona's Isle sailed for Liverpool. The Sophia Jane under the command of Lieutenant Tudor, R.N., sailed at the same time and reached Liverpool one and a half minutes ahead.

On Wednesday 18 August a similar race took place back to Douglas with a similar result. But on Friday 20 August, returning from Liverpool, Mona's Isle came in 40 minutes ahead. The pattern was established and Sophia Jane was regularly beaten, on one occasion in a gale, by over three hours.

The early defeats were probably caused by the fact that Mona's Isle's new engine took time to run in and full speed was not attainable at first. Mona's Isle, however, had proved herself capable of travelling between Liverpool and Douglas in eight hours at a speed of 8.5 knots (15.7 km/h; 9.8 mph).

The St. George Company engaged in a price-cutting war, and in September withdrew the Sophia Jane and replaced her with their largest and fastest steamer, the St. George. However, Mona's Isle won the first race largely because of the astuteness of Capt. Gill. Seeing a south-westerly gale developing, he had the coal and cargo moved to the windward side of the vessel, to prevent the windward paddle lifting out of the water.

By October 1830, Mona's Isle had established herself as the principal steamer between Liverpool and Douglas.

A letter to the Editor of the Liverpool Mercury stated:-

"Your impartiality in giving insertion to correct communications has induced me to forward you a few particulars respecting the interesting opposition at present existing in steam navigation with the Isle of Man. The triumphant result of the competition between the Mona's Isle and the Sophia Jane is pretty well known and needs no remark, which induced the St. George Company to try their last resource by placing the St. George on the station, confident that (although the Sophia Jane was beaten) the St. George could not share a similar fate. On Wednesday last the Mona's Isle and the St. George were opposed to each other in their passage from this port, and the Mona's Isle performed the distance in a shorter time, but it was on Friday that their safety was put to the test. On that day they left here together, about 11 o'clock a.m., the wind blowing right ahead and approaching to a storm, which continued to increase during the day. At 4 p.m. the hull and smoke of the St. George were left out of sight. The Mona's Isle arrived in Douglas a few minutes before one o'clock on Saturday, and the St. George not until nearly seven, being a difference of six hours in favour of the Manx boat. This is certainly the most surprising feat ever performed in steam navigation, particularly when the hitherto unrivalled character of the St. George is taken into consideration, and also the tempestuous state of the weather during the passage."

— Liverpool Mercury. Friday 1 October 1830.

The seamanship of Capt. Gill again came to the fore on 20 November. Having discharged passengers and cargo at Douglas, he decided to put to sea foreseeing a dangerous south-easterly gale. Lieutenant Tudor, in charge of St. George, anchored in Douglas Bay but lost the vessel in the night when her cable parted and she went aground on the Conister Rock and broke up. Through the efforts of Sir William Hillary, founder of the Royal National Lifeboat Institution, the crew of the St. George were saved.

The Isle of Man Steam Packet Company received its Royal Mail Warrant for the carriage of mail on 12 July 1831, and Mona's Isle took the title Royal Mail Ship for the first time on 19 July.

The Directors of the Isle of Man Steam Packet Company were becoming increasingly concerned about using Mona's Isle for winter service, and as a consequence a second vessel joined the fleet, the Mona, which commenced service in 1832; initially serving Whitehaven, and then taking over the service to Liverpool in October.

In 1834 the fleet was augmented by the larger and more powerful Queen of the Isle. Captain Gill transferred to take command of the new ship, being replaced in command of the Mona's Isle in turn by Captain Edward Quayle who prior to his transfer had been in command of the Mona.

On 26 July 1839, Mona's Isle rescued the crew of Nancy, which was wrecked on the Pollock Rocks, in Douglas Bay. Quayle was awarded a silver medal by Lloyd's of London for his actions.

In 1842 Mona's Isle opened a service between Douglas and Fleetwood.

Mona's Isle returned to Robert Napier & Co. to be re-boilered in 1846 at a cost of £500.

== Disposal ==
Attempts to sell Mona's Isle commenced in 1837, however such efforts to sell her failed. After 21 years of service, Mona's Isle was sold to Robert Napier in 1851. She was sold for breaking at a cost of £580.

== Trivia ==
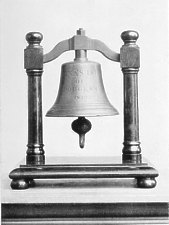
Mona's Isle Ship's Bell.

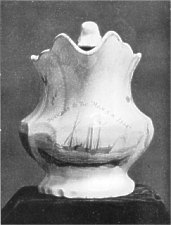
Commemorative jug of Mona's Isle (1830)

The Ship's bell of Mona's Isle is now preserved at the Manx Museum.

Such was the popularity of Mona's Isle, that jugs of what was called "Liverpool transfer Ware," were made, bearing a likeness of the ship, and with the legend; "Success to the Mona's Isle."

== Captain William Gill ==
Capt. William Gill was renowned for his seamanship, and is of particular note, as he was the first person to chart a safe, navigable channel through the (then) treacherous River Mersey. This navigable route became known as the Victoria Channel.
