= Baker University =

Private university in Baldwin City, Kansas, US

Coordinates: 38°46′39″N 95°11′16″W

- Type: Private university
- Established: 1858; 168 years ago
- Religious affiliation: United Methodist Church
- President: Jody Fournier
- Students: 1,945 (Fall 2023)
- Undergraduates: 1,457 (Fall 2023)
- Postgraduates: 488 (Fall 2023)
- Location: Baldwin City, Kansas, United States
- Campus: 10 acres (0.040 km^{2})
- Colors: Orange
- Nickname: Wildcats
- Sporting affiliations: NAIA – HAAC
- Website: www.bakeru.edu
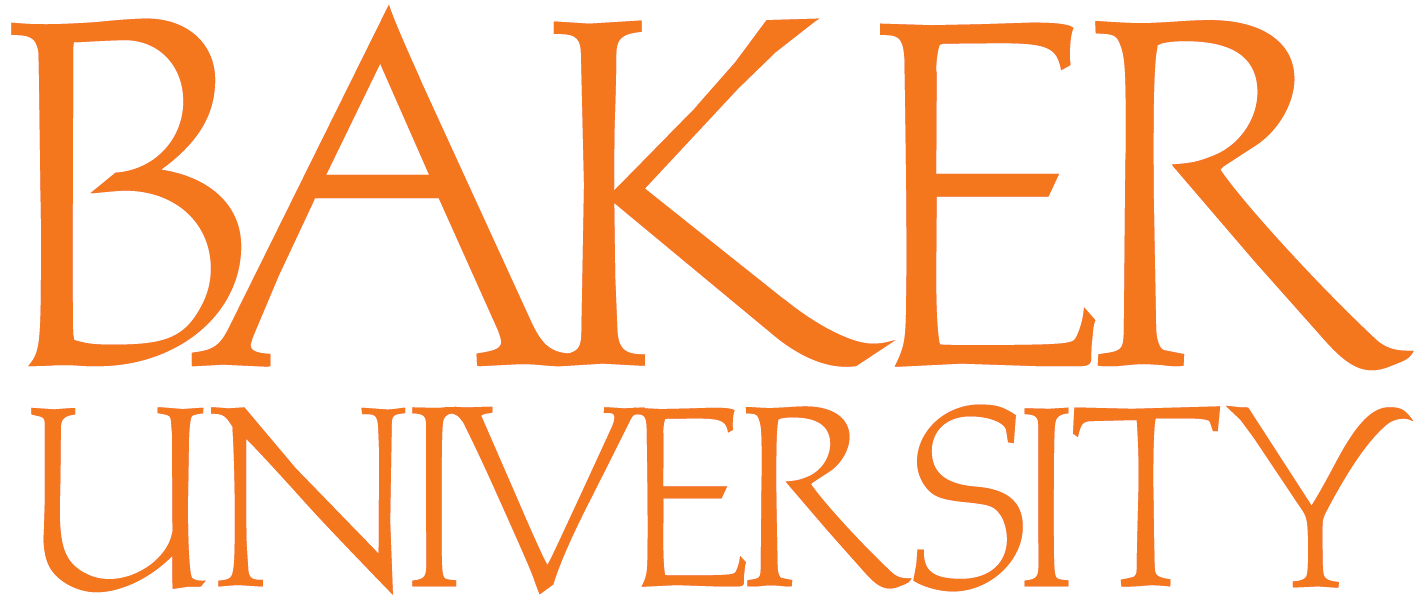

Baker University is a private university in Baldwin City, Kansas, United States. Founded in 1858, it was the first four-year university in Kansas and is affiliated with the United Methodist Church. Baker University is made up of four schools. The College of Arts and Sciences and the undergraduate courses in the School of Education (SOE) are located on the campus in Baldwin City. The School of Professional and Graduate Studies (SPGS) and the graduate branch of the SOE serve nontraditional students on campuses in Overland Park, Kansas, and online. The School of Nursing, which is operated in partnership with Stormont Vail Health in Topeka, offers a Bachelor of Science in nursing (BSN) and an online Master of Science in nursing (MSN). Enrollment in all four schools has grown to a student population of more than 3,000, with about 900 students on the Baldwin City campus.

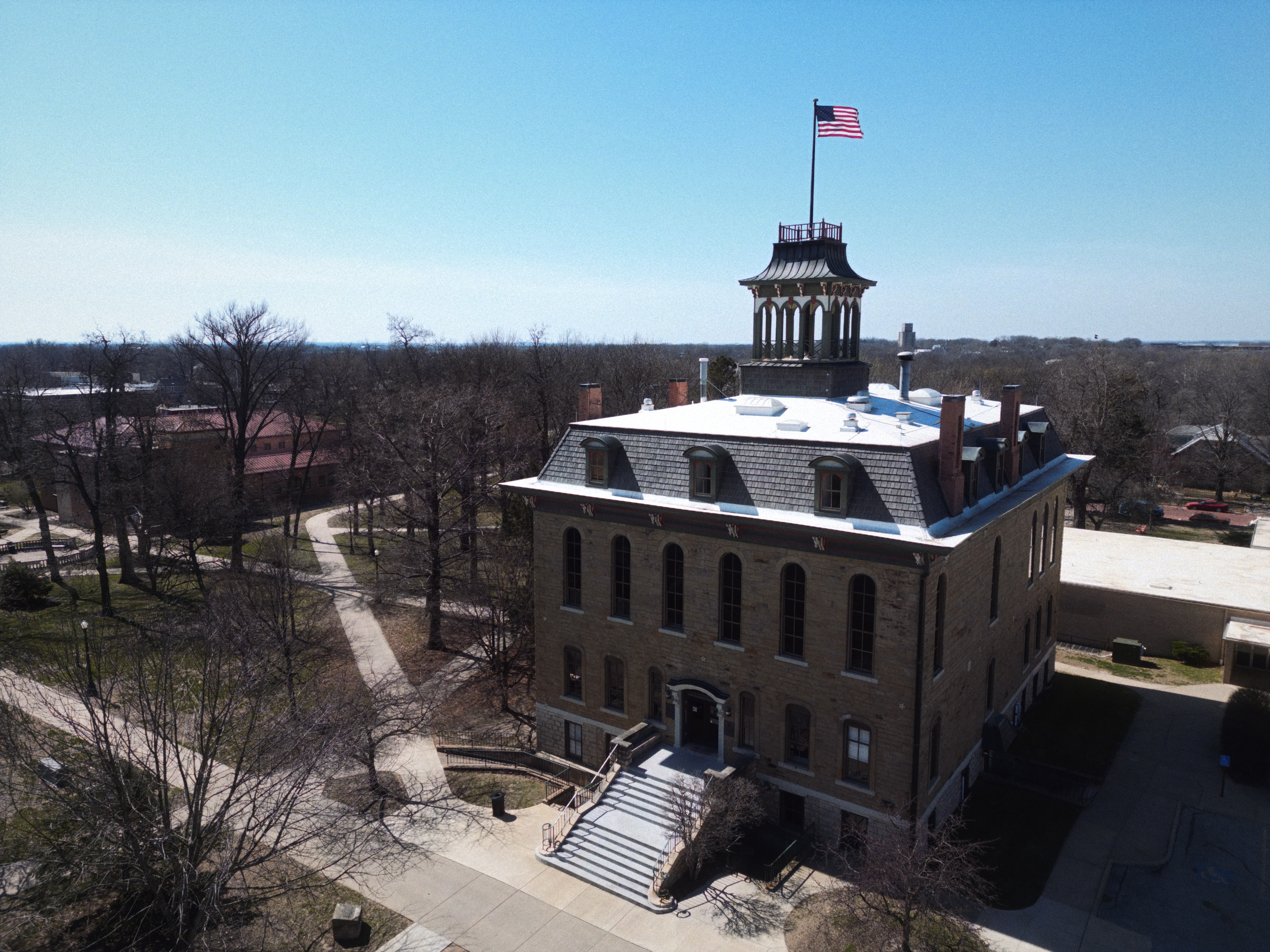
Parmenter Hall at Baker in Kansas

== History ==
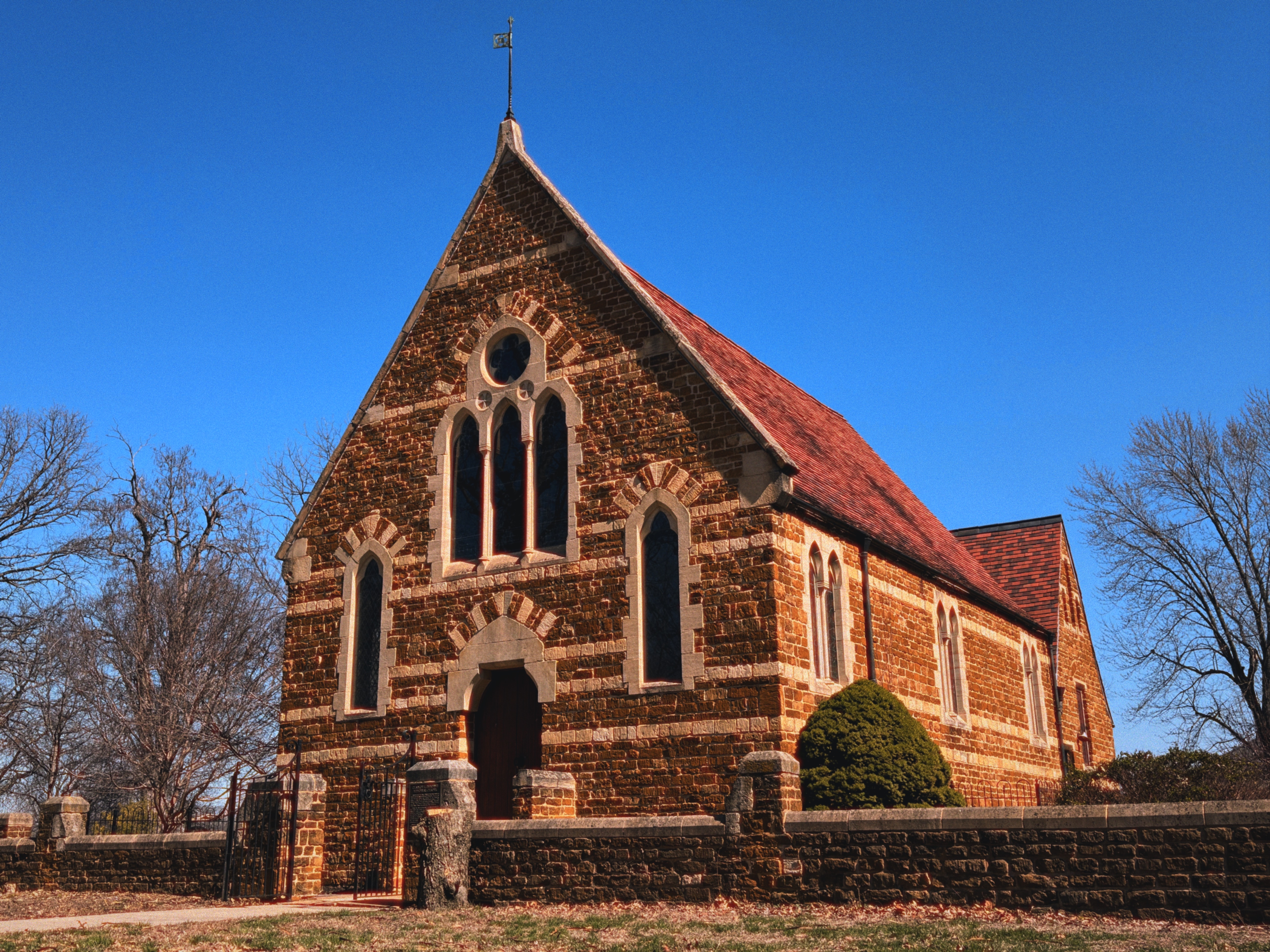
Clarice L. Osborne Memorial Chapel in Baldwin City Kansas at Baker University

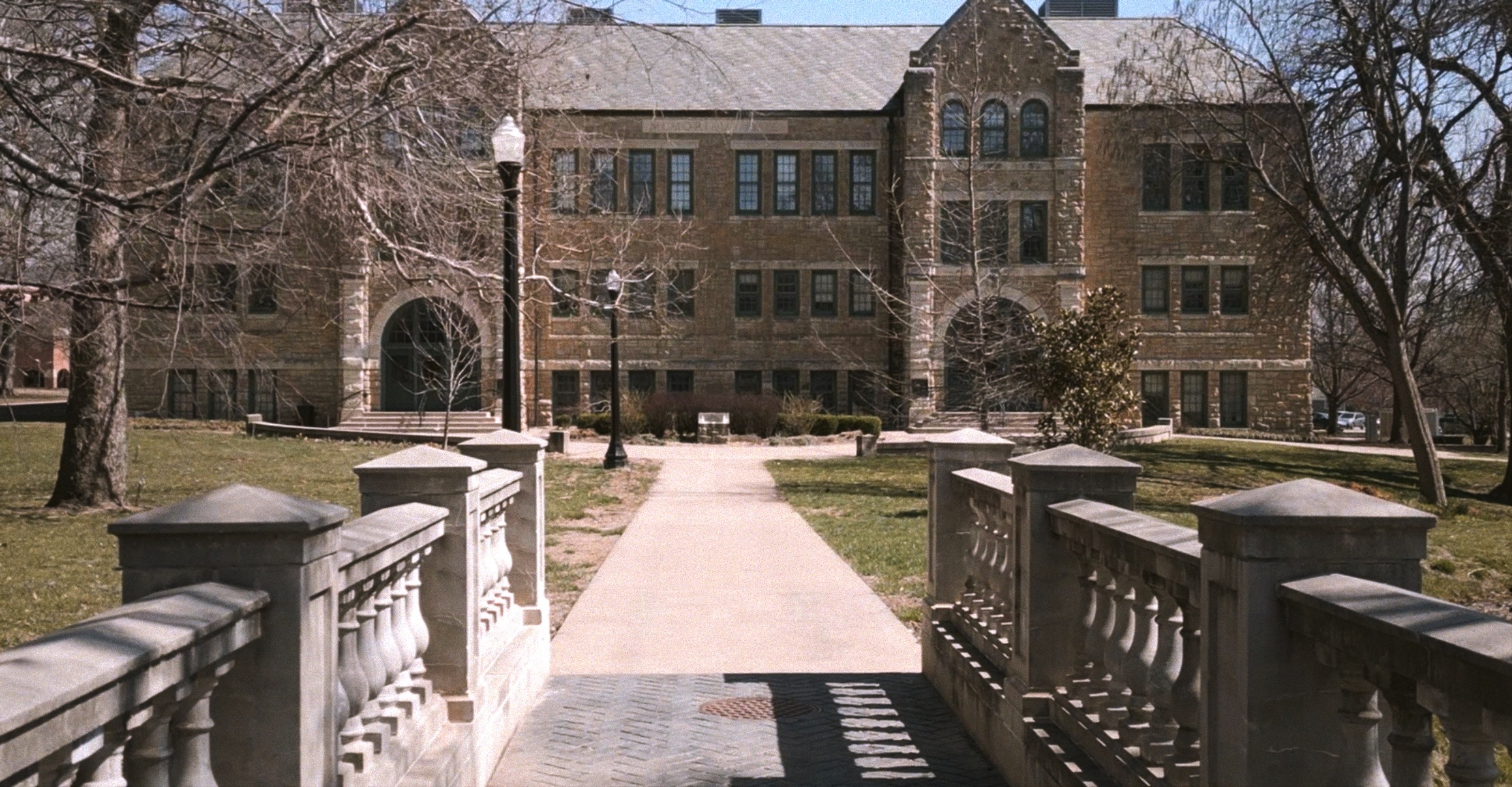
Baker's Campus during Spring Break in Kansas

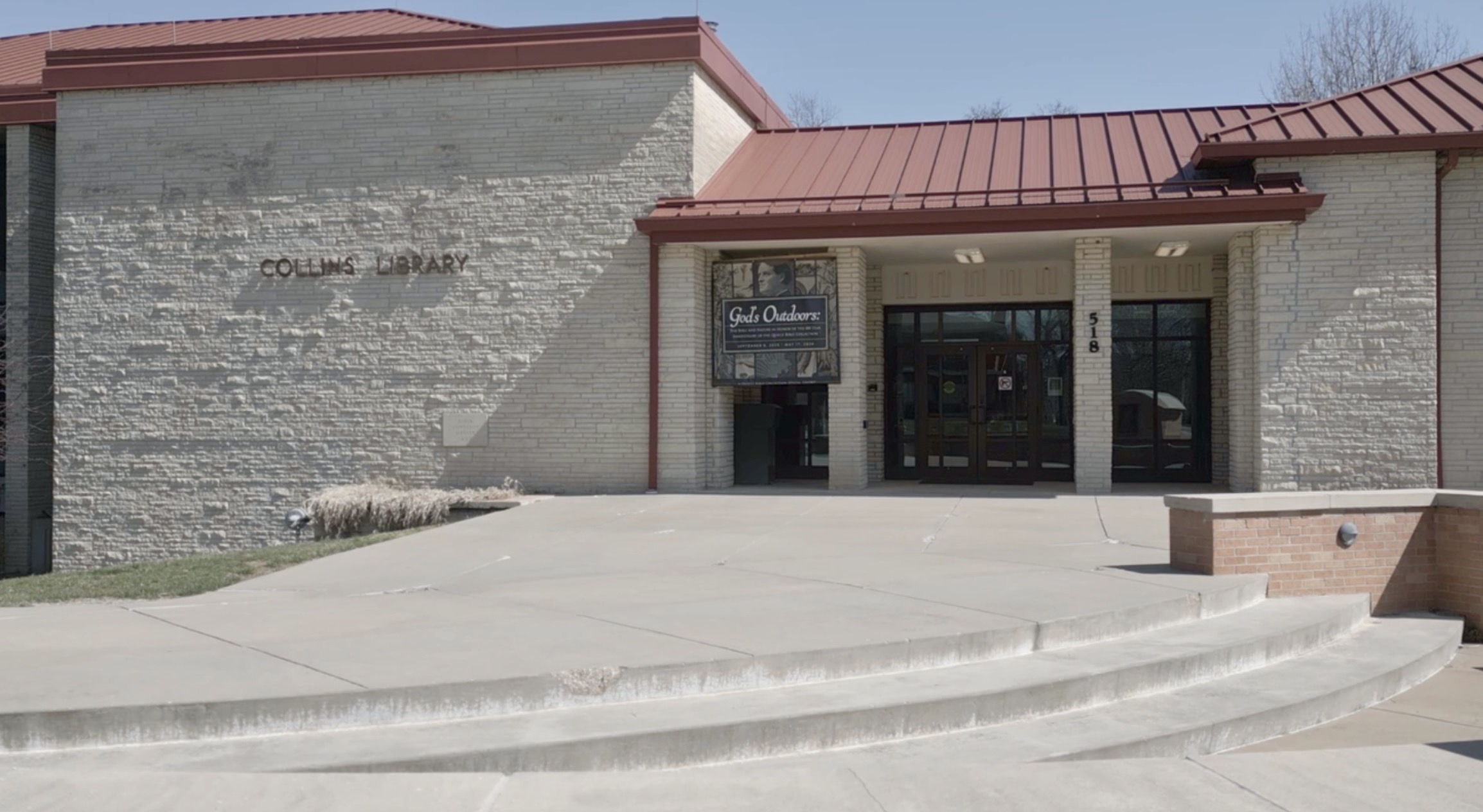
The Collins Library and the God's Outdoors Exhibit at Baker University in Baldwin City, Kansas

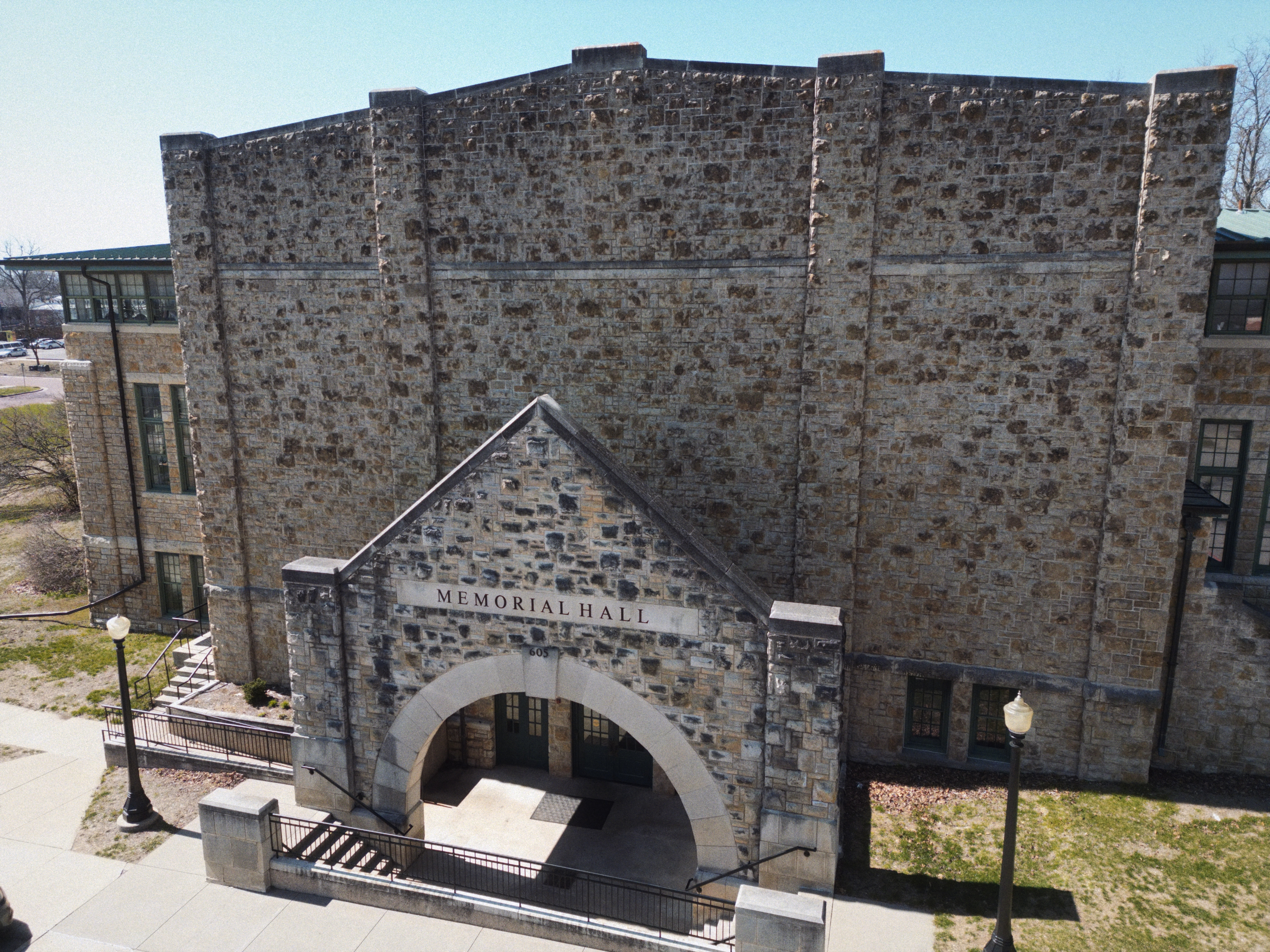
Memorial Hall Baker Kansas by Ian Ballinger

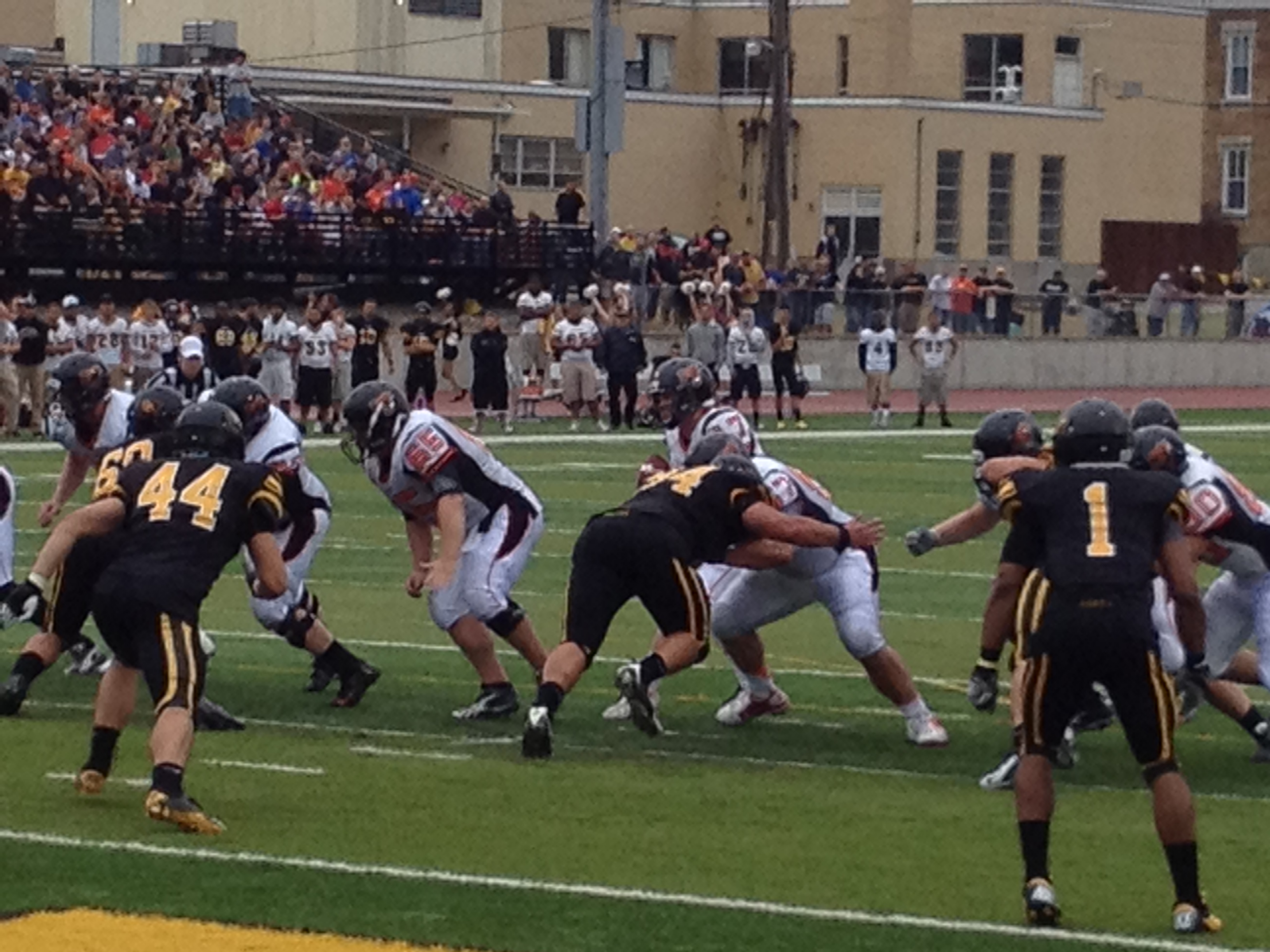
Baker Wildcats football team (white uniforms)

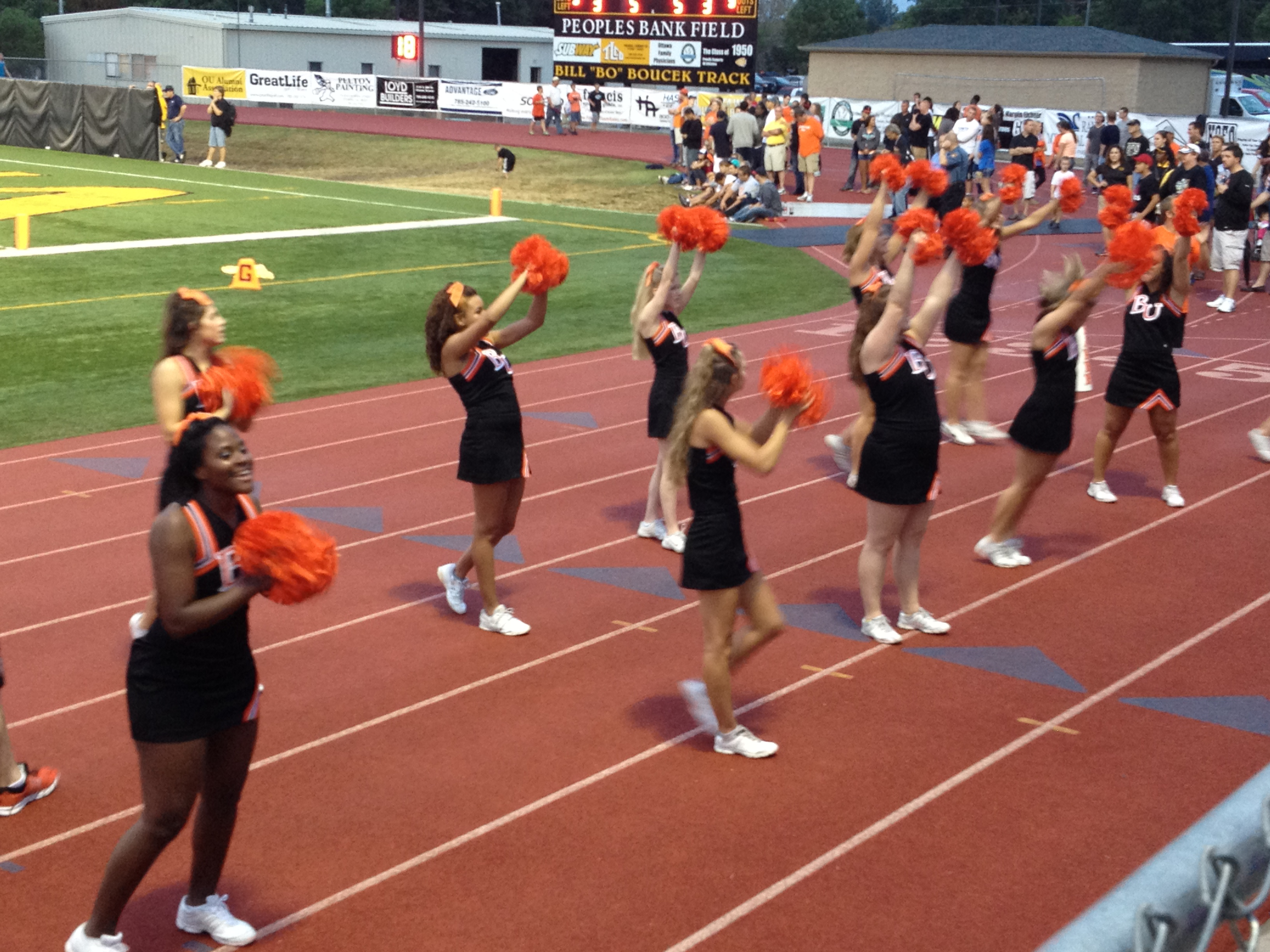
Baker pep squad leading cheers at a game

Baker University was founded in 1858 and named for Osman Cleander Baker, a Methodist Episcopal biblical scholar and bishop. The school—which is the oldest, continually operating institution of higher learning in the state—was the first four-year university in Kansas and funds were raised by local donations and donors from the East. Baker's first president, Werter R. Davis, a minister and Civil War officer, served from 1858 to 1862. The original campus building, now known as Old Castle Museum, houses a museum of the university and Baldwin City.

== Athletics ==
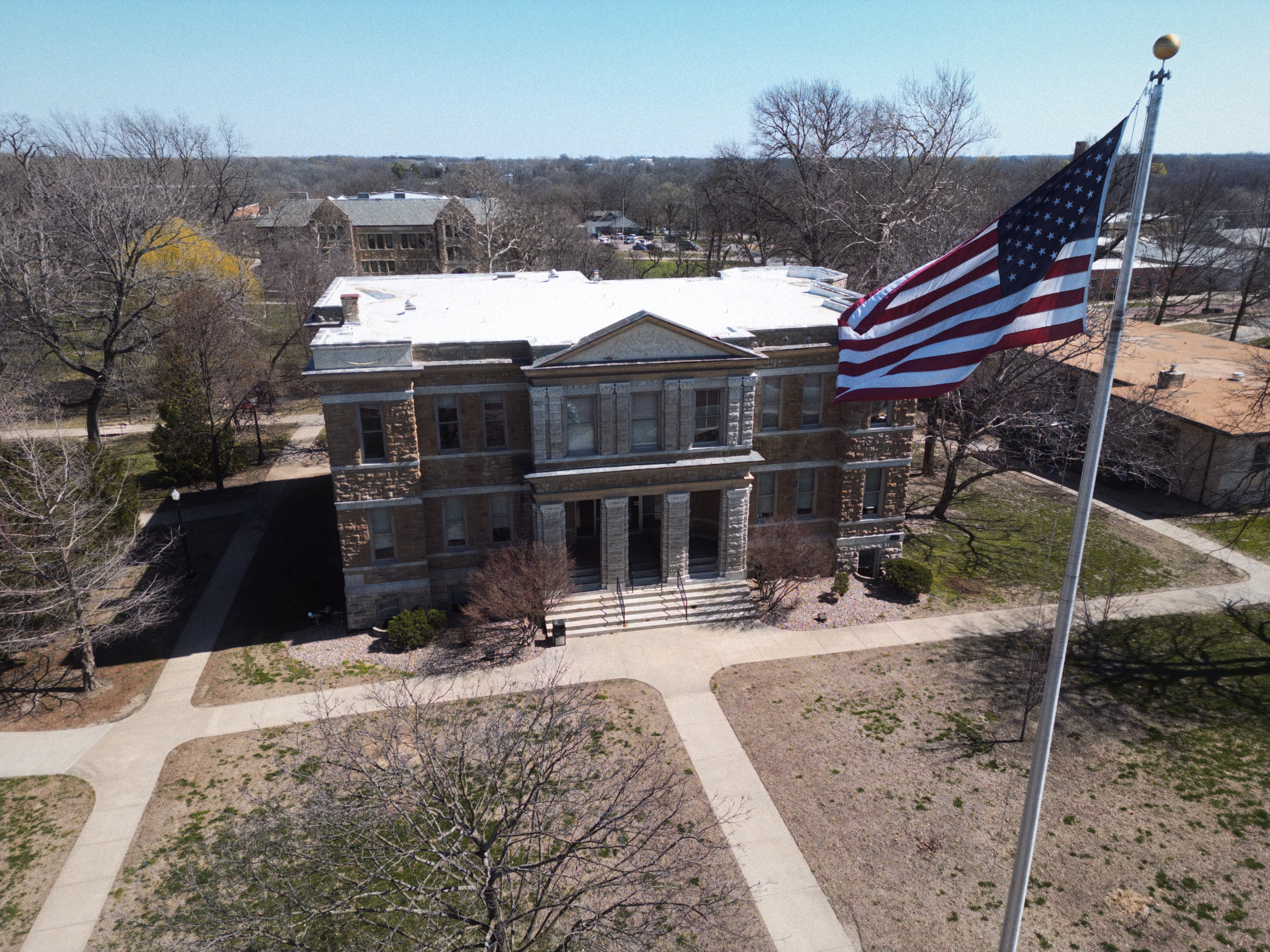
The campus of Baker in March 2026

The Baker athletic teams are called the Wildcats. The university is a member of the National Association of Intercollegiate Athletics (NAIA), primarily competing as a founding member of the Heart of America Athletic Conference (HAAC) since its inception in the 1971–72 academic year. The Wildcats previously competed in the Kansas Collegiate Athletic Conference (KCAC) from 1902–03 to 1970–71.

Baker competes in 26 intercollegiate varsity sports: Men's sports include baseball, basketball, bowling, cross country, football, golf, soccer, tennis, track & field and wrestling; while women's sports include basketball, bowling, cross country, golf, soccer, softball, tennis, track & field, volleyball, flag football and wrestling; and co-ed sports includes cheerleading, dance and eSports.

Baker was one of the first NAIA schools to take part in the Champions of Character program, which emphasizes respect, servant leadership, integrity, sportsmanship and responsibility. Since 1978 women have been competing in intercollegiate sports at Baker.

=== Colors ===
Baker has only one official color: cadmium orange. The only other school in the country to have orange as their only official color is Syracuse University.

=== Residential life ===
Baker University has three residence halls and two apartment buildings for students living on campus. Gessner Hall provides suite style living arrangements for 152 male residents. It was built in 1966, and the building was renovated in 2012. Irwin Hall provides suite style living arrangements for 150 female residents. The newest residence hall is the New Living Center, which houses 190 students in 48 rooms. The New Living Center is the largest on campus, with three stories and six wings totaling 52,000 square feet.

=== Fraternities and sororities ===
Greek life at Baker University began in 1865. Seven students founded a Phi Gamma Delta house. Additional students were initiated over the next couple years, but the fraternity was short-lived at Baker. Today, there are several fraternities and sororities on campus.

== Notable people ==
=== Alumni ===
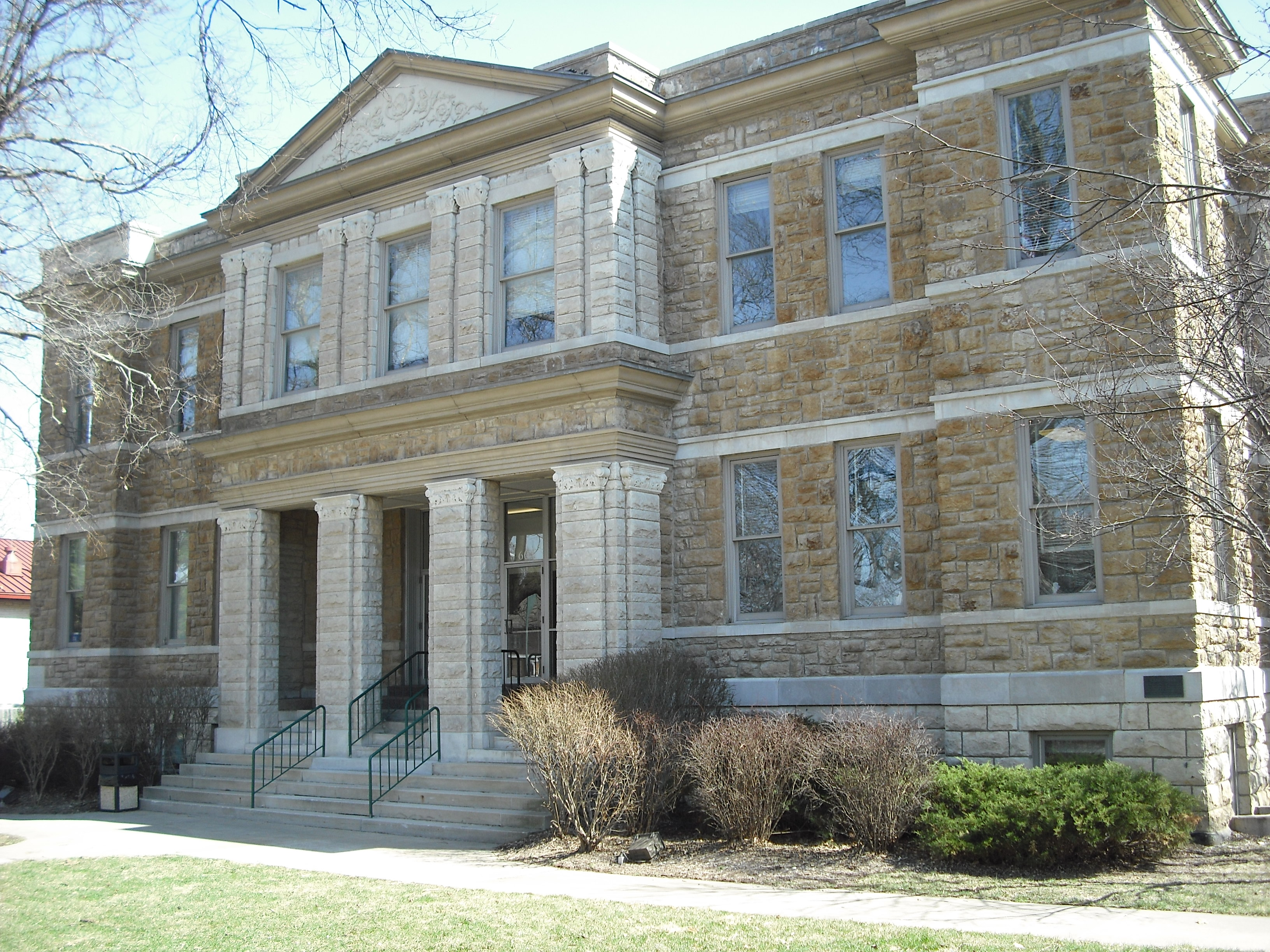
Case Hall, a Carnegie library (2009)

- Beulah Armstrong (1895–1965) – mathematician
- James Percy Ault – geophysicist, oceanographer, and captain of a research vessel
- Edith Bideau – singer, music educator
- Frank Bisignano - commissioner of the Social Security Administration (since 2025)
- Joseph Bristow – U.S. senator from Kansas, 1909–1915
- Andrew Cherng – Panda Express founder
- Nellie Cline Steenson – member of the Kansas House of Representatives, member of the Idaho House of Representatives and member of the Idaho Senate
- Don Holter – bishop of the United Methodist Church
- Mike Gardner – head football coach at Tabor College and formerly at Malone University
- Jennie Murray Kemp – temperance reformer
- Janette Hill Knox – temperance reformer, suffragist, teacher, writer
- George LaFrance – Arena Football League Hall of Fame member
- Kevin Mahogany – singer
- Andrew Long – educator
- Mike McCarthy – National Football League head coach of the Dallas Cowboys and Green Bay Packers; winning head coach of Super Bowl XLV
- Homer McCrerey – naval officer and bioneering oceanographer
- Candice Millard – class of 1989, book writer, journalist (former writer and editor for National Geographic magazine, author of three books)
- Vidal Nuño – pitcher for the New York Yankees, Arizona Diamondbacks and Seattle Mariners
- Tanner Purdum – New York Jets long snapper
- William Alfred Quayle – bishop of the Methodist Episcopal Church, elected in 1908
- Dewey Short – member of the U.S. House of Representatives from Missouri, 1929–1931; 1935–1957
- Bennett Jones Sims – sixth bishop of the Episcopal Diocese of Atlanta; consecrated as diocesan bishop in 1972
- Don C. Sowers – economist, sociologist, physicist, consultant, and academic
- Patrick Tubach – class of 1996, nominee for the Academy Award for Best Visual Effects, Star Trek Into Darkness
- Philip P. Campbell – class of 1888, member of the U.S. House of Representatives from Kansas, 1903–1923
- Ernest Eugene Sykes – class of 1888, businessman and Freemason from New Orleans

=== Faculty ===
- Phog Allen – collegiate basketball coach at Baker University, the University of Central Missouri and the University of Kansas
- Emil S. Liston – basketball coach and administrator
- John Clark Ridpath – educator and historian
- William M. Runyan – preacher and songwriter
