= SS Tynwald (1846) =

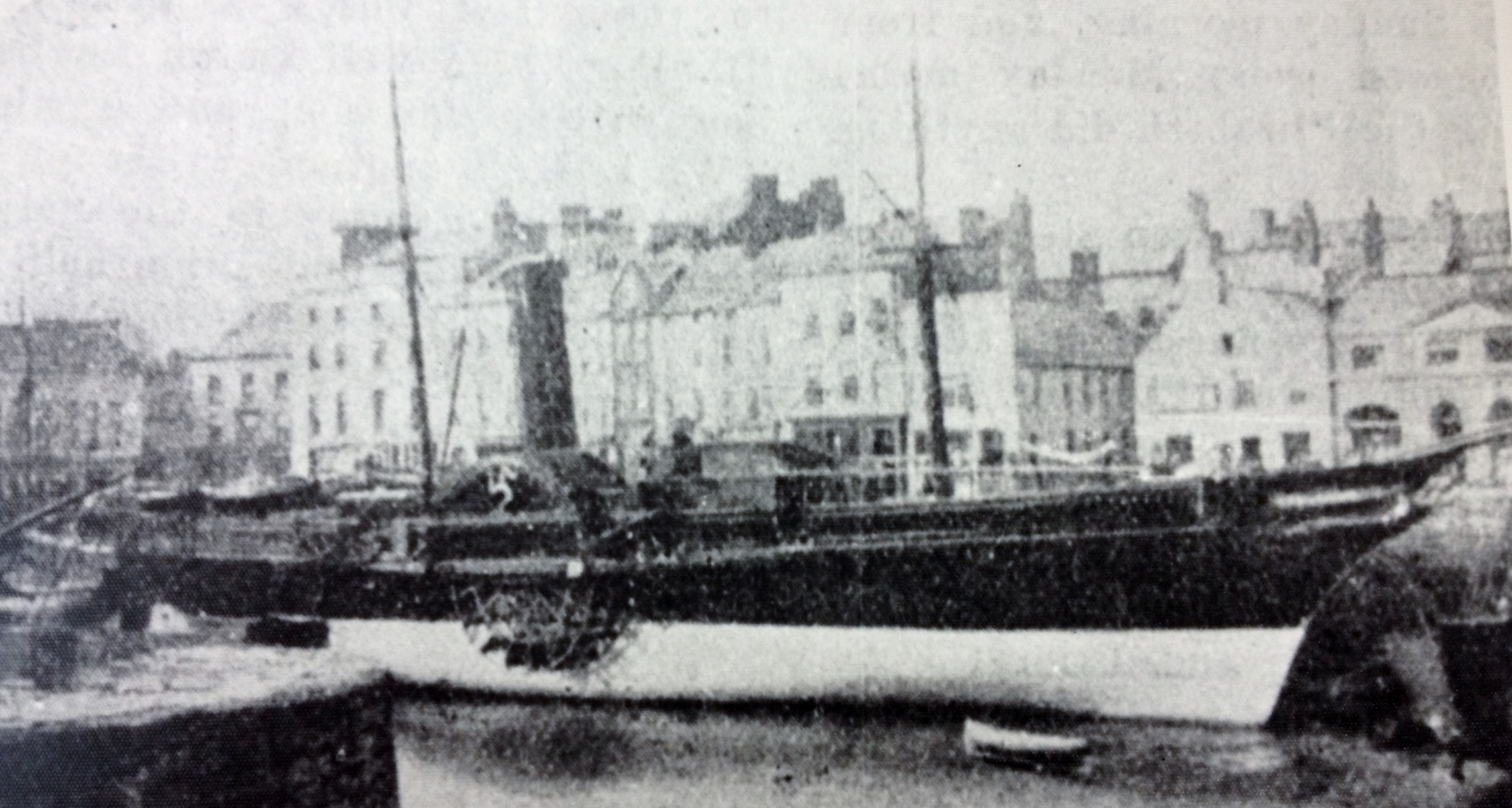
- Tynwald berthed at the Coffee Palace Berth, Douglas.

History

Isle of Man
- Name: Tynwald
- Namesake: Tynwald
- Owner: 1846-1886: Isle of Man Steam Packet Company
- Operator: 1846-1886: Isle of Man Steam Packet Company
- Port of registry: Douglas, Isle of Man
- Route: Isle of Man to Liverpool
- Builder: Robert Napier and Sons
- Cost: £21,500
- Yard number: 19
- Way number: 21921
- Launched: 28 April 1846
- Completed: 1846
- Identification: Official Number 21921; Code Letters N J H K
- Fate: Scrapped 1866

General characteristics
- Type: Paddle Steamer
- Tonnage: 700 gross register tons (GRT)
- Length: 188 ft (57 m)
- Beam: 27 ft (8.2 m)
- Draught: 13.5 ft (4.1 m)
- Installed power: 280 horsepower (210 kW)
- Propulsion: Oscillating steam engine
- Speed: 16 knots (18 mph)
- Capacity: 781 passengers

SS (RMS) Tynwald (I), No. 21921, was an iron paddle-steamer which served with the Isle of Man Steam Packet Company, and was the first vessel in the Company to bear the name.

== History ==
The Isle of Man Steam Packet Company's first Tynwald was built by the Robert Napier and Sons of Glasgow, in 1846. She has the dubious distinction of being the first Steam Packet vessel whose launch was delayed by a strike in the shipbuilding yard - as reported by the directors in 1846. The first, but by no means the last.

Tynwald was a reliable ship. A local newspaper described her as being 'as sure as a mountain goat'.

The fastest ship of her day, Tynwald recorded 16 knots (18 mph) on her sea trials.

Upon her completion, she was taken under the command of the Commodore of the Line, Captain William Gill and made passage to Douglas in a time of 12hrs.

The arrival of the Tynwald was celebrated in the Mona's Herald:-

"This magnificent steam ship arrived last night in Douglas Bay about a quarter to twelve o'clock, having made the passage from Greenock. A salute was fired from the Fort Ann Hotel, and a number of people were assembled on the pier, but the moonlight did not enable us to notice her proportions, farther than her rig. She will come into the harbour at an early hour this morning, and will sail to Dublin on a pleasure excursion with the shareholders and other friends exclusively, on Thursday night at 11 o'clock, and return on Friday evening at 8 o'clock."

— Mona's Herald. Wednesday, September 2, 1846.

On Thursday 31 December 1846, when on charter to the Liverpool and Belfast Company and under the command of Captain William Gill, she collided with the Admiralty Steam Vessel Urgent and damaged a paddle box. The collision occurred in the River Mersey, in the vicinity of the Formby Lightship. Captain Gill was exonerated by the directors: the accident occurred in dense fog. It is noted in the Company minutes, that a provision of £386 (equivalent to £47,215 in 2023) was to be set aside to meet repairs to the damage suffered by the vessel. This did not prevent the directors from later claiming £2,004 (equivalent to £245,127 in 2023) in compensation for damage and loss of earnings, and then, on legal advice, settling for £1,489. On 22 February 1848, she collided with the brig William. One of the vessels lost her bowsprit, jib-boom and bulwarks. On 21 December 1854, she struck steps at the Prince's Pier, Liverpool, severely damaging her starboard paddle box and forcing the cancellation of her sailing to the Isle of Man. In December 1863, she was in collision with the Naval brig Wild Wave, the settlement after a long wrangle costing the Steam Packet £1,128 (equivalent to £137,976 in 2023).

== Layout ==
Tynwald was rigged as a barquentine, with a clipper bow. She had three masts, with the funnel abaft of the paddle boxes. A conspicuous feature was a full length figurehead of a Manx Scandinavian king in armour.

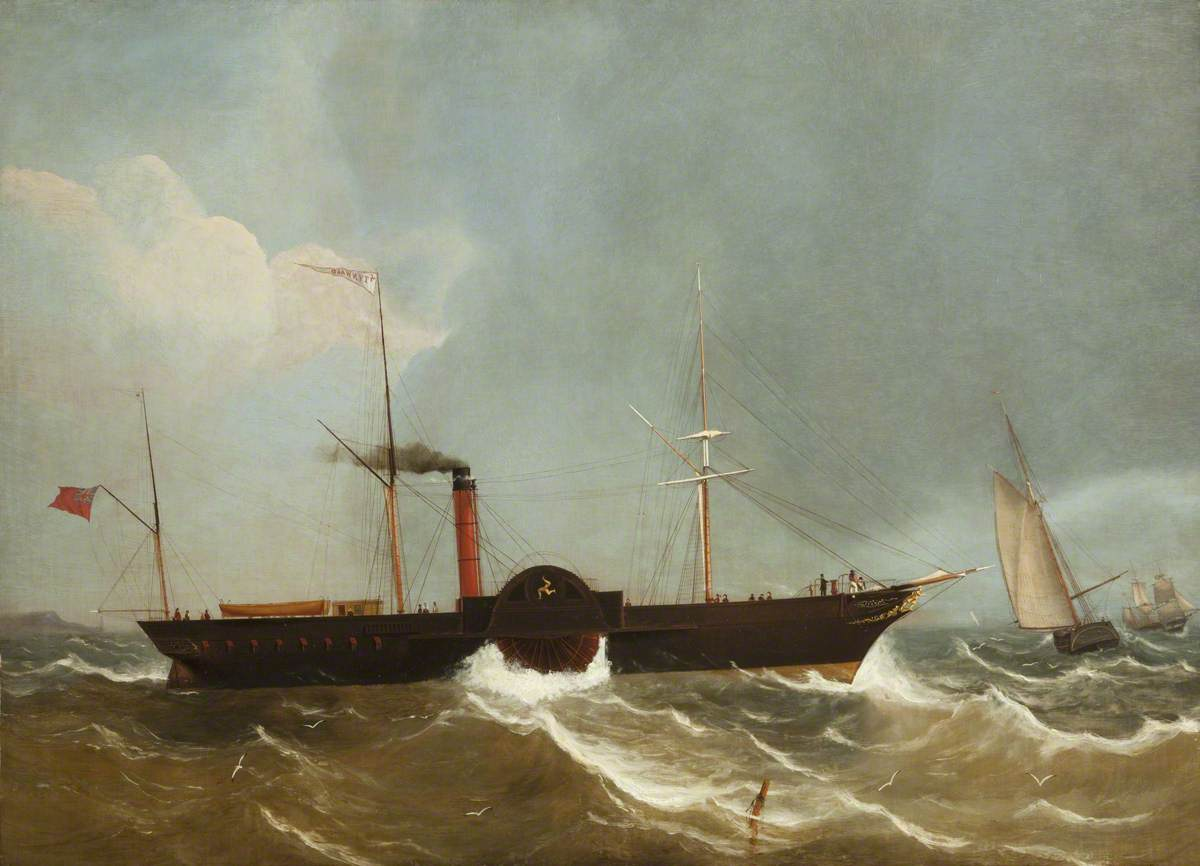
1846 painting of Tynwald by Samuel Walters.

== Service ==
Tynwald operated the passenger and cargo service between Liverpool and the Island of Man. After 1863, she was only used as cargo vessel.

During the winter season in 1850, she was chartered to go to the Mediterranean and called at Gibraltar, Genoa and Leghorn, making the round trip in 30 days.

== Disposal ==
After an eventful career of 20 years, she was sold to Caird & Company for £5,000 (equivalent to £585,079 in 2023) in part payment for her successor, Tynwald (II).
