= SS Queen of the Isle =

Scottish paddle steamer, launched 1834

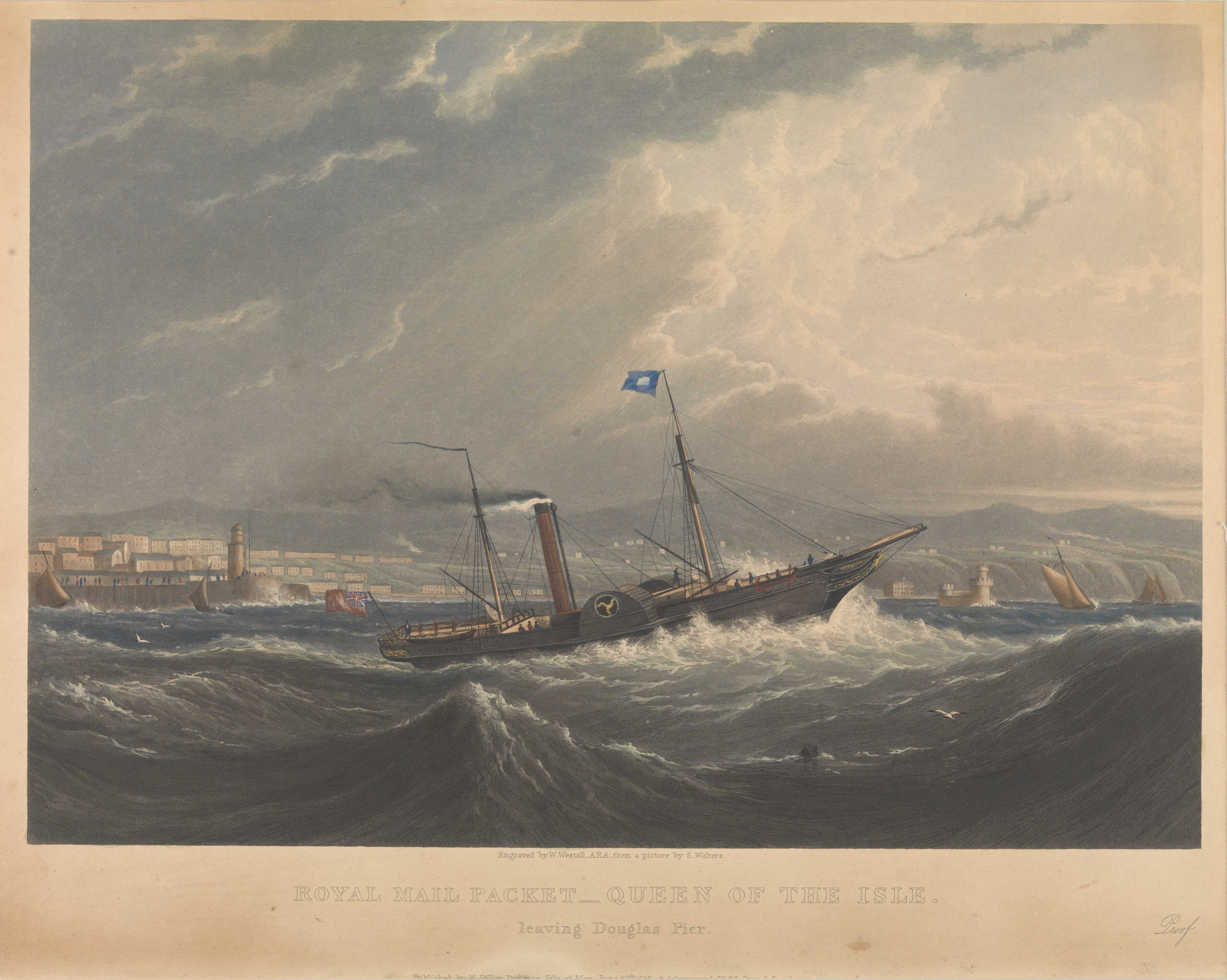
- Royal Mail Packet - Queen of the Isle leaving Douglas Pier

History
- Name: Queen of the Isle
- Owner: 1834–1845: IOMSPCo.
- Operator: 1834–1845: IOMSPCo.
- Port of registry: Douglas, Isle of Man
- Builder: Robert Napier & Co., Glasgow.
- Launched: 3 May 1834
- Out of service: Sold in 1845 and converted to a sailing ship.
- Fate: Reported lost off the Falkland Islands.

General characteristics
- Type: Paddle-steamer.
- Tonnage: 350 gross register tons (GRT)
- Length: 128 feet (39 m)
- Beam: 21 ft 6 in (6.6 m)
- Depth: 12 ft 7 in (3.8 m)
- Ice class: N/A
- Installed power: 140 shp (100 kW)
- Propulsion: Napier Side Lever Engine, developing 140 shp (100 kW) driving twin Paddle wheels
- Speed: 9.5 knots (10.9 mph)
- Capacity: Not Recorded.
- Crew: Not Recorded.

SS (RMS) Queen of the Isle was a paddle steamer which was constructed by Robert Napier & Co. Glasgow. No Official number is recorded for the vessel, as formal registration was not introduced until the Merchant Shipping Act 1854.

Launched on Saturday, 3 May 1834, Queen of the Isle entered service with the Isle of Man Steam Packet Company in September of that year. Queen of the Isle served the Steam Packet for eleven years, until the Company sold her in 1845.

== Construction and dimensions ==
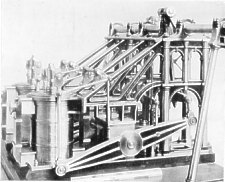
Side Lever Napier Engine as fitted to Queen of the Isle

Queen of the Isle was the third vessel to enter service with the line, and the second to be constructed by Robert Napier & Co.

Queen of the Isle was a carvel built wooden paddle steamer which had a registered tonnage of 350 GRT. Length 128'; beam 21'6"; depth 12'7". Schooner rigged with a standing bowsprit, her engine developed a nominal horse-power of 140 h.p.; and gave her a design speed of approximately 9 knots.

The Queen of the Isle was said to be the fastest vessel on the Irish Sea in her day.

The launch of the Queen of the Isle attracted considerable attention from the Scottish press. A report in the Glasgow Herald in 1834 stated:-

"She has, by competent judges, been pronounced one of the finest specimens of naval architecture that has ever floated, and that it is confidently expected that, when completed, she will be unrivalled in speed and comfort."

— Glasgow Herald. Saturday, May 3, 1834.

Her commencement of service was greeted with excitement on the Isle of Man, the Mona's Herald stating:-

"We have also understood, that it is the intention of this spirited company to place on the line between Liverpool and Douglas early in June, another superior steamer, (which is now building at Greenock,) the Queen of the Isle, to be commanded by Captain William Gill, and intended to run in concert with the Mona's Isle every day alternately, with the mail and passengers, when those persons who are desirous of making an agreeable summer excursion to the island will be enabled to avail themselves of the opportunity presented by these first-rate vessels."

— Mona's Herald. Friday, April 25, 1834.

== Service life ==
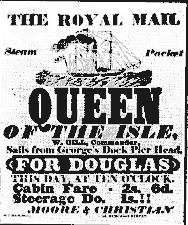
Advert for passage to the Isle of Man aboard the Queen of the Isle.

Queen of the Isle arrived in Douglas on Wednesday, 10 September 1834. Captain Gill assumed command, his command of the Mona's Isle being taken by Captain Edward Quayle and on 11 September she took a party of excursionists on a trip around the Island.

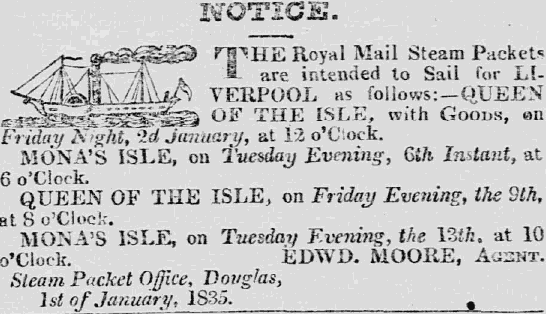
Winter timetable for January 1835, regarding the sailings of the Queen of the Isle and Mona's Isle.

1834 also saw the beginning of the daily summer service between Douglas and Liverpool leaving Douglas at 08:00hrs, and Liverpool at 10:00hrs. The winter service was increased to two sailings a week in each direction throughout the winter.

On 25 March 1835, under the command of Capt. Quayle, the Queen of the Isle collided with the steamer Irishman in the Mersey approaches and, although damaged, towed the Irishman into Liverpool.

On 27 May 1835, in a race between the two vessels, Queen of the Isle beat the packet ship Richmond.

In 1842 a Queen of the Isle inaugurated a weekly service between Douglas and Dublin.

== Disposal ==
Before her disposal, Queen of the Isle's engine was taken out and installed in the Ben-my-Chree. Queen of the Isle was then sold and converted to a full rig sailing ship in 1845.

She is reputed to have sailed all over the world, until she was eventually reported lost off the Falkland Islands.
