= SS Ben-my-Chree (1845) =

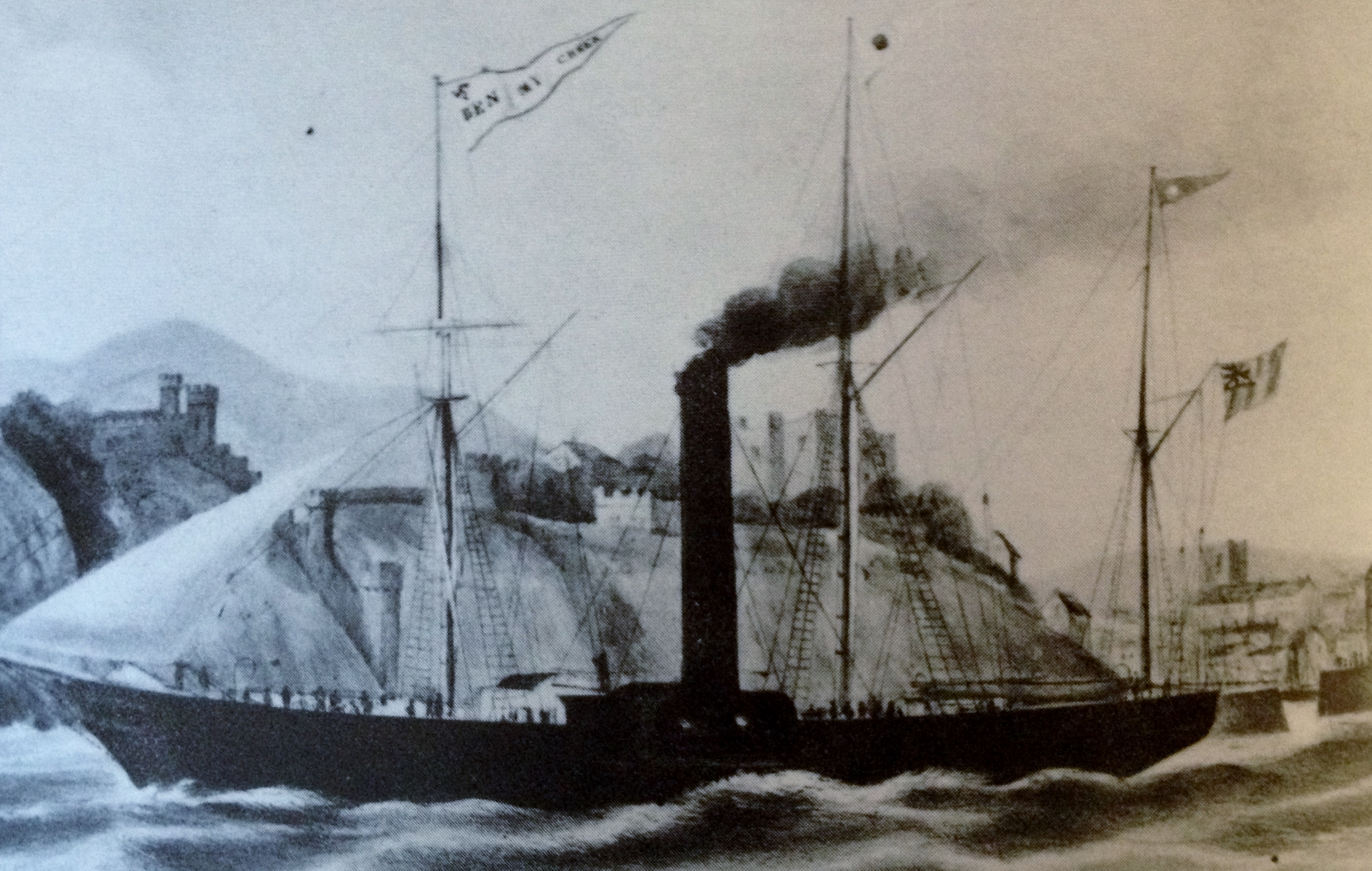
- 'Painting of Ben-my-Chree departing Douglas.

History
- Name: Ben-my-Chree
- Owner: 1845–1860: Isle of Man Steam Packet Company
- Operator: 1845–1860: IoMSPCo.
- Port of registry: Douglas, Isle of Man
- Builder: Robert Napier and Sons, Glasgow
- Cost: £11,500
- Laid down: 1845
- Launched: 3 May 1845
- Acquired: 1845
- Maiden voyage: 1845
- Out of service: 1860
- Identification: Official Number 21922; Code Letters H J H L
- Fate: Sold on behalf of the IoMSPCo. by Todd & McGregor to the African Steamship Company
- Status: Last reported as a hulk on the Bonny River, 1930

General characteristics
- Type: Paddle Steamer
- Tonnage: 458. (However the Company's list gives the tonnage as 399). GRT
- Length: 151 ft 9 in (46.3 m)
- Beam: 23 ft 0 in (7.0 m)
- Depth: 12 ft 5 in (3.8 m)
- Propulsion: Napier Side Lever Engine (taken from Queen of the Isle), developing 140 shp (100 kW) driving twin Paddle wheels
- Speed: No official speed recorded, but estimated at 9 knots (17 km/h; 10 mph)

SS (RMS) Ben-my-Chree (I) No. 21922 was an iron paddle-steamer which served with the Isle of Man Steam Packet Company, and was the first vessel in the company to bear the name.

== Dimensions ==
Ben-my-Chree had a registered tonnage of 458. However, in the company's Fleet List it was recorded as 399. Length 151'9"; beam 23'; depth 12'5"; speed (approximately) 9 knots.

== Construction and service life ==
Ben-my-Chree was built by Robert Napier and Sons in Glasgow in 1845 for £11,500. Ben-my-Chree's engine was taken from another Company ship, the Queen of the Isle before that vessel was sold and converted to a full-rig sailing ship. The speed of Ben-my-Chree is not recorded, but Napier's engine had produced a speed of 9 knots in the earlier ship. It is also recorded that while the first registration of the Ben-my-Chree gives her tonnage as 458 GRT, the company's Fleet List and other sources give it as 399 GRT. Boiler pressure had increased slightly in the 13 years since the start of the Steam Packet Company, and this vessel's was 20 pounds per square inch (140 kPa).

Ben-my-Chree has the distinction of being the first iron-built vessel in the Steam Packet Fleet.

== Disposal and subsequent fate ==
After 15 years service, Ben-my-Chree was disposed of by the Company in 1860. She was sent to Leith, Scotland, and sold by Tod and McGregor for £1,200 (equivalent to £142,374 in 2023) to the African Steamship Company.

After many years service, she was reported to be lying a hulk on the Bonny River, West Africa, 85 years after her launching.
