= Charlie Quayle =

English footballer

Personal information
- Full name: Charles James Quayle
- Date of birth: 11 April 1907
- Place of birth: Kirkdale, Liverpool, England
- Height: 5 ft 9 in (1.75 m)
- Position: Forward

Senior career*
Years	Team	Apps	(Gls)
- Seventh Kings
1932–1933	New Brighton	11	(2)
1933	Accrington Stanley	0	(0)
- Shrewsbury Town
- Drumcondra
1936–1938	Crystal Palace	10	(3)
1938–1939	Bradford City	0	(0)
- * Club domestic league appearances and goals

Charles James Quayle (born 11 April 1907) was a football centre-forward who played league football for New Brighton and Crystal Palace.
