= William Alfred Quayle =

American poet

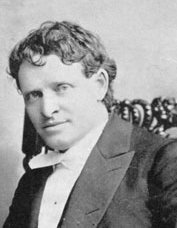
Bishop Quayle.

William Alfred Quayle (25 June 1860 – 9 March 1925) was an American Bishop of the Methodist Episcopal Church, elected in 1908.

== Birth and family ==
William was born 25 June 1860 in Parkville, Missouri, the son of Thomas and Elizabeth (Gayle) Quayle. William married Allie Hancock Davis 28 January 1886. They had a son, William R. Quayle, and a daughter, Allie Gayle Quayle (who predeceased him).

William Alfred Quayle died at his home in Baldwin City, Kansas, on 9 March 1925. His extensive collection of bibles and religious texts were donated to Baker University and are part of the museum at the university library.

== Education ==
William earned an A.B. degree from Baker University in 1885 and an A.M. from Baker in 1888. While in college, he met Joseph L. Bristow, later a U.S. senator from Kansas, and they developed a friendship they maintained throughout their lives. In 1892, he earned his PhD from Allegheny College.

== Ordained and academic ministry ==
William served as a tutor at Baker University (1883–84), then as an adjunct professor of ancient languages (1885). He was ordained to the ministry of the M.E. Church in 1886. He then received the appointment of professor of Greek language (1887–90), and as president of Baker University (1890–94).

The Rev. Dr. Quayle was appointed pastor of an M.E. Church in Kansas City, Missouri, in 1894. He was appointed to Indianapolis, Indiana, in 1897. He was sent back to Kansas City, Missouri, in 1900. He then was appointed pastor of the St. James M.E. Church in Chicago in 1904, serving there until his election to the episcopacy.

The Rev. Dr. Quayle was elected a delegate to M.E. General Conferences in 1896 and 1908. He was also a Fraternal Delegate to the English Wesleyan Church in 1902.

== Episcopal ministry ==
The Rev. Dr. Quayle was elected to the episcopacy of the M.E. Church by the 1908 General Conference. He was assigned to Oklahoma City, Oklahoma, as his episcopal residence. He also served St. Paul, Minnesota.

As a bishop he attended the Ecumenical Conference of 1911. He also was a member of the Joint Hymnal Revision Committee of American Methodism.

== Honorary degrees ==
DePauw University awarded Quayle the honorary degree of Doctor of Divinity in 1892. In addition, Baker University awarded him an honorary Litt.D. in 1900 and honorary LL.D. in 1908. Lawrence College also him awarded an LL.D. in 1908.

== Selected writings ==
- Poet's Poet and Other Essays, The Methodist Book Concern, 1897.
- Study in Current Social Theories, The Methodist Book Concern, 1898.
- A Hero and Some Other Folk, The Methodist Book Concern, 1899.
- Blessed Life, The Methodist Book Concern, 1900.
- Books and Life, The Methodist Book Concern, 1901.
- Pastor-Preacher, The Methodist Book Concern, 1901.
- In God's Out-of-Doors, The Methodist Book Concern, 1902.
- Laymen in Action, The Methodist Book Concern, 1902.
- Eternity in the Heart, The Methodist Book Concern, 1904.
- Prairie and the Sea, The Methodist Book Concern, 1905.
- Lowell and the Christian Faith, The Methodist Book Concern, 1906.
- God's Calendar, The Methodist Book Concern, 1907.
- Book of Ruth, Dodge Publishing Company, 1909.
- Song of Songs, The Methodist Book Concern, 1910.
- Climb to God, The Methodist Book Concern, 1912.
- Beside Lake Beautiful, The Methodist Book Concern, 1914.
- Poems, The Methodist Book Concern, 1914.
- The Healing Shadow, The Abingdon Press, 1923.
- A Book of Clouds, The Abingdon Press, (1925).

== See also ==
- List of bishops of the United Methodist Church

== Sources ==
- Leete, Frederick DeLand, Methodist Bishops. Nashville, The Methodist Publishing House, 1948.
- Price, Carl F., Compiler and Editor: Who's Who in American Methodism, New York: E.B. Treat & Co., 1916.
