= Quail Creek =

Quail Creek may refer to:

- Quail Creek (Alaska), a tributary of Troublesome Creek
- Quail Creek State Park, a state park in Utah
