= Quill (surname) =

Quill or Quille is an anglicised version of the Irish surname " Ó Cuill" Coll, Coill, and O'Coill (Ó Coill), all of which mean wood, forest or shrub hazel tree. The Coill clan are believed to be a bardic family from Munster, particularly counties Kerry and Cork. The Irish surname has also been anglicised as Woods. Notable people with the surname include:

- Alf Quill, Australian athlete
- Declan Quill, Irish Gaelic footballer
- Eric Quill (b. 1978), American soccer player
- Erin Quill, American actress
- Gene Quill (1927–1988), American musician
- Greg Quill, Australian musician
- Jeffrey Quill (1913–1996), British aviator and author
- John Quill, Irish rugby player
- John Quill, pseudonym of Charles Heber Clark
- Kid Quill, stage name of American musician Mitchell Quilleon Brown
- Máirín Quill (1936–2025), Irish politician
- Michael D. Quill Sr. (b. 1949), mayor of Auburn, NY
- Mike Quill, one of the founders of the Transport Workers Union of America (TWU), a subway workers union
- Peter Quill (footballer) (b. 1969), Australian athlete
- Timothy Quill, Irish politician
- Timothy E. Quill, American physician

== Fictional characters ==
- Peter Quill, birth name of Star-Lord, a superhero from Marvel Comics
- Meredith Quill, Marvel Comics character and Peter Quill's mother
