= Quail Island =

Quail Island is the name of various locations:

- Ōtamahua / Quail Island, in Banks Peninsula, Canterbury
- An islet in Palmyra Atoll, US Minor Outlying Islands
- Quail Island (Victoria), Australia
- Quail Island (Northern Territory), Australia
- Quail Island, Cape Verde, near Praia, the capital of Cape Verde
