= Joseph L. Bristow =

American politician (1861–1944)

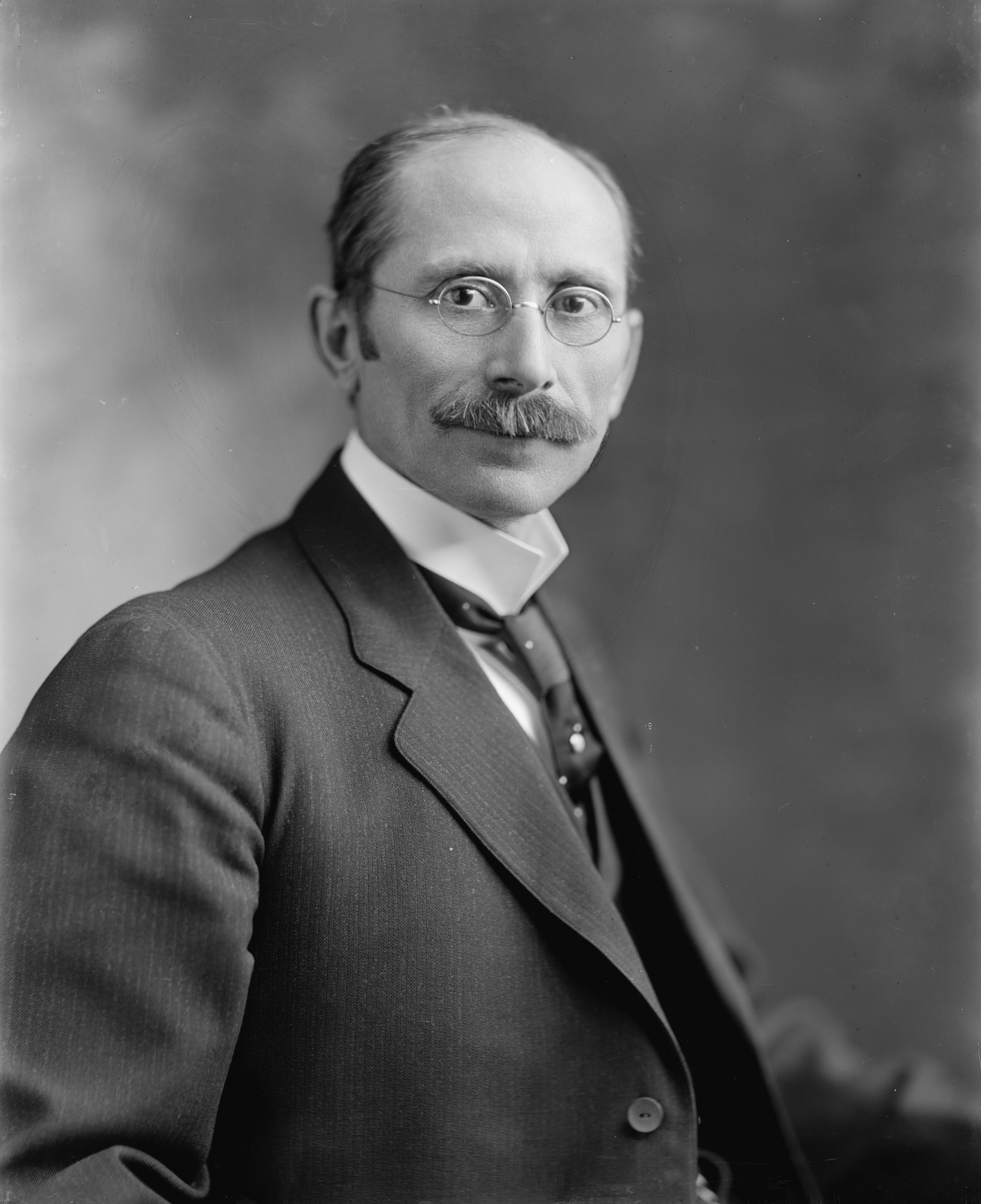
- Bristow, 1905–1944

United States Senator from Kansas
- In office March 4, 1909 – March 3, 1915
- Preceded by: Chester I. Long
- Succeeded by: Charles Curtis

Fourth Assistant United States Postmaster General
- In office March 22, 1897 – March 20, 1905
- President: William McKinley; Theodore Roosevelt
- Preceded by: Robert A. Maxwell
- Succeeded by: Peter Voorhees De Graw

Chairman of the Kansas Public Utilities Commission
- In office April 1, 1915 – March 31, 1918
- Preceded by: Charles F. Foley
- Succeeded by: Charles H. Sessions

Member of the Kansas Public Utilities Commission
- In office March 5, 1915 – March 31, 1918
- Preceded by: James Cable
- Succeeded by: Charles H. Sessions

Personal details
- Born: Joseph Little Bristow; July 22, 1861 Hazel Green, Kentucky, U.S.
- Died: July 14, 1944 (aged 82) Annandale, Virginia, U.S.
- Resting place: Gypsum Hill Cemetery, Salina, Kansas, U.S.
- Party: Republican
- Spouse: Margaret Hendrix (m. 1879)
- Children: 5
- Education: Baker University
- Occupation: Newspaper editor

Joseph Little Bristow (July 22, 1861 – July 14, 1944) was a Republican politician from the American state of Kansas. Elected in 1908, Bristow served a single term in the United States Senate where he gained recognition for his support of several political causes of the Progressive Era. In retirement, Bristow was a farmer in Annandale, Virginia.

Bristow is a part of American political folklore when his Senate speech on "what the country needs" moved a bored Vice President Thomas R. Marshall, the presiding officer, to stage whisper "What this country really needs is a good five-cent cigar."

== Early life ==
Joseph Little Bristow was born just outside the hamlet of Hazel Green, Kentucky on July 22, 1861, the son of William Bristow and Savannah (Little) Bristow. William Bristow was the son of a Methodist minister who had become a Methodist minister, taught school, and was a Union Army veteran of the American Civil War. Following the 1868 death of his mother, Bristow was raised and educated in his grandfather's devoutly religious household.

William Bristow moved to Kansas in 1876, and Joseph Bristow followed. After briefly working as a farmer, Bristow decided to pursue a career as a Methodist minister, and in 1882, his wife and he moved to Baldwin, Kansas so Bristow could enroll at Baker University.

== Start of career ==
After deciding not to become a member of the clergy, Bristow's political career began while still a student, when he organized a Blaine and Logan club to support the Republican nominees for president and vice president in the 1884 United States presidential election. He graduated from Baker University in 1886, receiving a Bachelor of Arts degree with honors. He received a Master of Arts degree from Baker in 1889. In 1912, Baker University awarded Bristow the honorary degree of LL.D. While in college, Bristow joined the Delta Tau Delta fraternity and was a member of the Biblical Society, the oldest of Baker's four student literary societies. He also developed a close friendship with William Alfred Quayle, who later became a bishop of the Methodist Episcopal Church.

After graduating, Bristow served two two-year terms as clerk of the district court of Douglas County, Kansas. While serving as court clerk, Bristow also served as president of the Young Men's Republican Club of Lawrence. He went on to edit or publish several Kansas newspapers, including the Baldwin Ledger, the Ottawa Herald, and the Daily Republican, Republican-Journal and Irrigation Farmer, all in Salina.

Bristow supported Benjamin Harrison for president in 1888, and that same year won election as secretary of the Kansas Republican Committee. From 1895 to 1897, he served as private secretary to Governor Edmund Needham Morrill. As an advocate for agricultural expansion and environmental conservation, in the 1890s he was one of the founders of the Interstate Irrigation Association.

== Assistant Postmaster General ==
Bristow campaigned for the Republican ticket of William McKinley and Garret Hobart in the 1896 United States presidential election. After McKinley took office as president, he appointed Bristow as Fourth Assistant United States Postmaster General. This was a high level administrative post at the United States Post Office Department, with responsibility for divisions including Rural Free Delivery, supplies, dead letters, and topography. During his postal department career, post offices were established in Bristow, Missouri and Bristow, Oklahoma, and both communities were named in Bristow's honor.

After the Spanish–American War, the McKinley administration dispatched Bristow to Havana to investigate and report on corruption in the postal service of the United States Military Government in Cuba. Bristow later investigated post office corruption during the McKinley and Theodore Roosevelt administrations, and when Republican legislators were implicated, they successfully petitioned Roosevelt to remove him. In 1905, Roosevelt appointed Bristow as a special commissioner to investigate operation of the Panama Railroad, which was controlled by the U.S. government, and make recommendations on its future relationship with the Panama Canal, which was then under construction.

== United States Senator ==
As a Republican identified with progressive and anticorruption policies, Bristow succeeded in creating primary elections for U.S. Senate seats, and in 1908 he won election to the senate after prevailing in a contested primary. In the senate, Bristow advocated nationwide direct election of Senators, who were chosen by state legislatures. Bristow was an author of the Seventeenth Amendment, which passed in 1912, and established the election of senators by statewide popular vote.

During his senate career, Bristow served as chairman of the Committee on Expenditures in the Post Office (61st and 62nd Congresses) and the Committee on Cuban Relations (63rd Congress). Bristow opposed the original version of the Mann–Elkins Act for regulating railroads and utilities, because he believed the proposed federal commerce court would weaken the Interstate Commerce Commission's authority, but supported the act when it was amended to place the proposed court's authority with the commission. Like most progressive Republicans, Bristow also opposed the Payne–Aldrich Tariff Act, which raised duties on imported products, arguing that manufacturers did not deserve to profit at the expense of higher prices for consumers.

In 1911, Dwight D. Eisenhower competed for an appointment from Bristow to the United States Military Academy (West Point). He performed well on the examination administered by Bristow's staff, which resulted in his recommendation for the appointment. Eisenhower then performed capably on the academy's entrance exam and was admitted to West Point's Class of 1915.

In 1912, Bristow supported Theodore Roosevelt for president, but did not join Roosevelt's new Progressive Party, believing that it would not attain long-term success. Bristow was an unsuccessful candidate for reelection in 1914.

=== "What this country needs..." ===
Bristow provoked a sarcastic comment from Vice President Thomas R. Marshall that has since become well known in American political lore. According to columnist Fred C. Kelly, in early 1914 Bristow delivered a lengthy Senate speech on "what this country needs." An increasingly bored Vice President Thomas R. Marshall had presided while Bristow spoke. Shortly afterwards, Bristow ran into Marshall in a lobby outside the senate chamber. Marshall was preparing to smoke, and as Bristow approached, the following exchange took place:

Marshall: “You overlooked the chief need of the country.”
Bristow: “What’s that?”
Marshall: “The thing that seems to be needed most of all is a really good 5-cent cigar.”

In early 1915, columnist Thomas F. Logan repeated the story, though in his version some of the details had changed. In Logan's version, Marshall was presiding during Bristow's speech and said to the senate's assistant secretary: “There’s some truth in what Bristow says, but he hasn’t yet hit the most important thing. What this country really needs is a good five-cent cigar.”

== Later life ==
In January 1915, Governor-elect Arthur Capper announced his intention to appoint Bristow to the Kansas Public Utilities Commission. Bristow joined the commission on March 5, 1915, the day after his senate term expired. In April 1915, Bristow was appointed to serve as the commission's chairman, and he served until resigning to campaign for a U.S. Senate seat in 1918. His primary campaign was unsuccessful, and Capper won the general election.

In retirement, Bristow was a resident of Ossian Hall, an 18th-century plantation house in Annandale, Virginia. Bristow died at Ossian Hall on July 14, 1944. He was buried at Gypsum Hill Cemetery in Salina.

== Family ==
In November 1879, Bristow married Margaret H. Hendrix of Flemingsburg, Kentucky. They were the parents of five children, the first two of which died in infancy— William H., Bertha M., Joseph Q., Frank B., and Edwin M. Edwin died in 1935, after which Bristow took on responsibility for raising Edwin's seven children.

== Footnotes ==
U.S. Senate
Preceded by Chester I. Long	U.S. Senator from Kansas, Class 3; 1909-1915	Succeeded by Charles Curtis
