= Ernest Eugene Sykes =

American Freemason and businessman

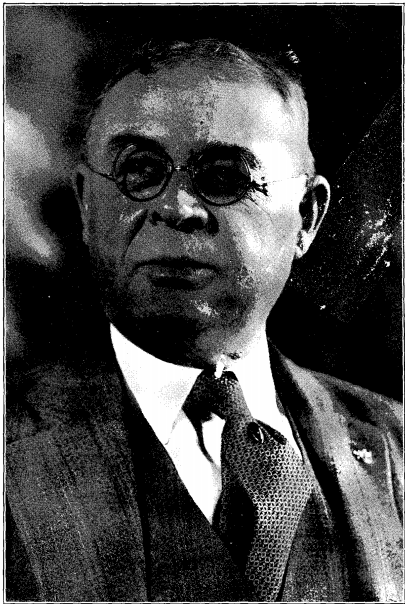
E.E. Sykes

Ernest Eugene Sykes Sr. (January 3, 1867 – March 24, 1942) was prominent in New Orleans business and fraternal affairs.

== Early life ==
Sykes was born on January 3, 1867, to Albert Sykes (1817–1906), a native of New York, and Emily Higgins Sykes (1835–1904), a native of Pennsylvania, on a farm near Waverly, Iowa. His grandfather, Colonel Daniel Sykes, served in the War of 1812, and his great-grandfather, Ashbel Sykes, served in the Revolutionary War.

In 1872, the family moved, by covered wagon, to a new farm near Oswego, Kansas. Sykes attended the district schools there before matriculating to Baker University in 1884. During his time as a student, he served as president of the Athenians (literary and debating society) and graduated in 1888 with a Bachelor of Science degree.

== Business career ==
After college, he engaged in farming at Oswego (1888-90), later working as secretary-treasurer of the Rich Hill Water, Light & Fuel Company at Rich Hill, Missouri (1890-1893) and purchasing agent of the Gulf, Colorado and Santa Fe Railway at Galveston, Texas (1893-1900).

He moved to New Orleans in February of 1900, and engaged in the cypress lumber business with E.B. Williams and O.H. Williams. Together, the three men founded the Southern Saw Mill Co, Ltd., the Avoyelles Cypress Co, Ltd., and the Ascension Red Cypress Co, Ltd.

In 1920, Sykes and O.H. Williams, with several partners, founded the United Lands Company. Sykes served as president from 1925 until his death in 1942.

Additionally, he was vice president of the New Orleans Gravel Company and a member of the boards of directors of the Victory Oil Company, New Prytania Market Association, and Fidelity Bank.

== Freemasonry ==
Sykes joined the Masonic Order in 1916, and was accepted into the Ancient Arabic Order of the Nobles of the Mystic Shrine in 1918. 1921 saw him sign the charter to form Trinity Lodge, shortly thereafter becoming its Master. He served as active secretary of the executive committee tasked with planning the 1922 Knights Templar Triennial Conclave at New Orleans. He served in 1927 as executive secretary of the Masonic Flood Relief Board, formed to provide aid for the people of Louisiana, Mississippi, and Arkansas, following the Great Mississippi Flood of 1927. His handling of the stupendous labor connected with the collection of more than $600,000 of relief funds has been described as "a matter of Masonic history."

In 1928, he was elected Illustrious Potentate of Jerusalem Temple by unanimous vote. The following year, he was summoned to Washington, D.C. by the Supreme Council, Scottish Rite (Southern Jurisdiction, USA) to receive the thirty-third degree. In 1931, he served as Grand Master of the Grand Lodge of Louisiana. "His administration was a marked success. Being a businessman, the Craft was indeed fortunate in having him at the helm during a financial crisis superinduced by the world-wide depression. His wise administration carried the organization safely over many obstacles. During his incumbency, he visited more Constituent Lodges than any previous Grand Master, and was instrumental in breaking down the barrier between Ordinary Masons and a Grand Lodge Official. This was a real Masonic service that has since borne fruit."

== Civic Activities ==
Sykes was deeply interested in civic causes, and served on the boards of trustees of the Warrington Home (shelter for homeless men), the Catherine Club (shelter for homeless women), and the New Orleans YWCA. Additionally, he was involved in the founding of Shriners Hospitals for Children and was a member of the board of directors of the Masonic Home for Children at Alexandria, Louisiana.

== Personal life ==
In 1895, Sykes married Mary Caroline "Carrie" O'Byrne (1868–1956), an 1888 graduate of the Baker University Conservatory of Music. She was the daughter of Rev. Richard Edwin O'Byrne (1839–1919), a minister of the Methodist Episcopal Church, and Hannah Stephens O'Byrne (1843–1871). Her paternal grandfather was William O'Byrne (1805-1868), and her maternal grandfather was Jacob Stephens (1813-1892), prominent paper manufacturer of Brookville, Indiana.

Together Ernest and Carrie Sykes had 2 children:

- Ernest Eugene Sykes Jr.
- Lois Hazel Sykes

Ernest Sykes died at age 75 on March 24, 1942, of a heart attack.
