= Francis Quayle =

Anglican priest in Ireland (1650–1716)

Francis Quayle (1650–1716) was an Anglican priest in Ireland.

Quayle was born in the Isle of Man and educated at Trinity College, Dublin. He was Prebendary of Brigown in Cloyne Cathedral and Archdeacon of Ross from 1704 holding both preferments until his death.
