= SS Mona (1832) =

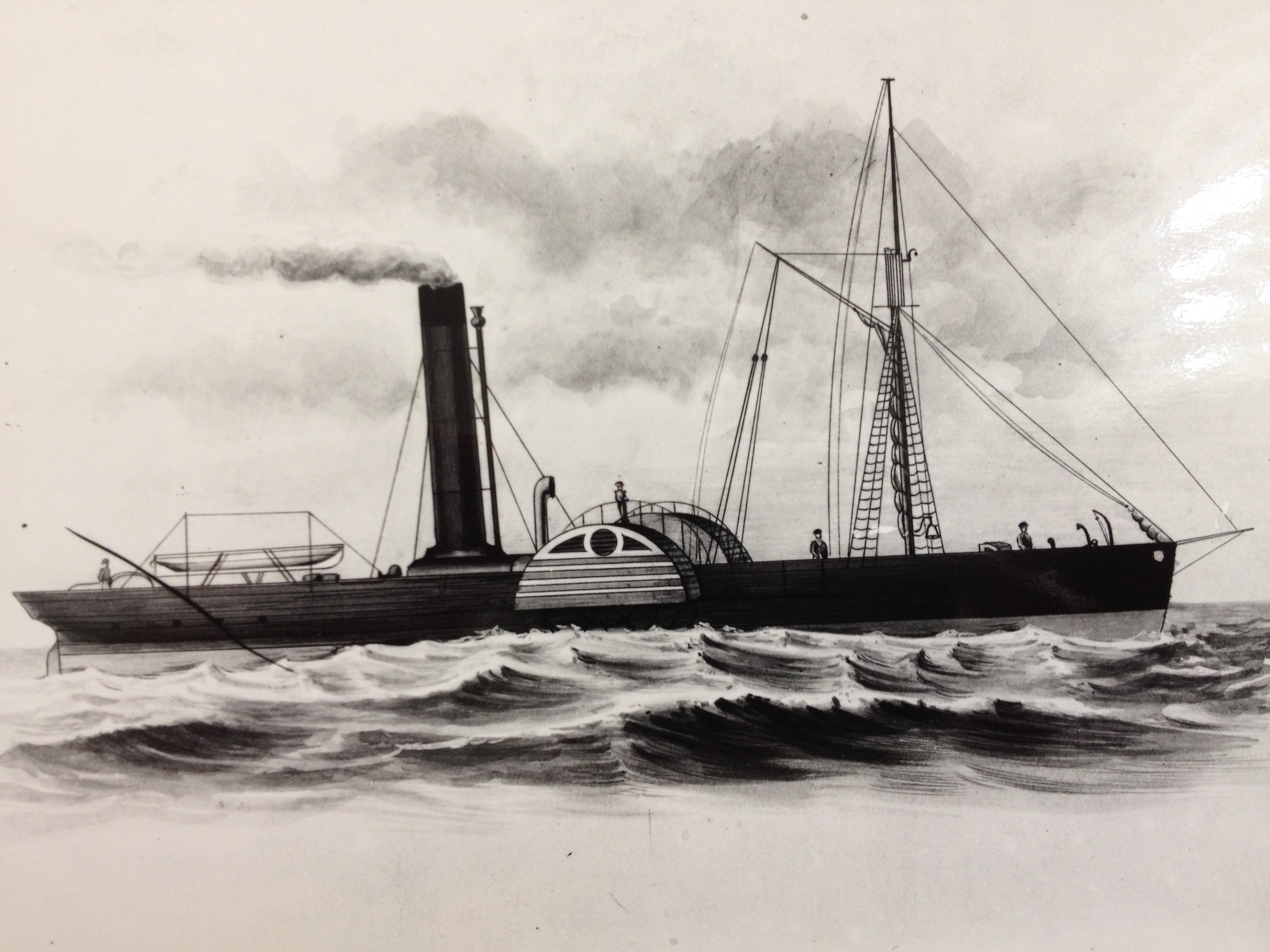
- Mona

History
- Name: Mona
- Owner: 1831: IOM Steam Packet Co; 1841: Liverpool Steam Tug Co; 1852: Ward, Sheridan & Flanagan; 1854: H Sheridan & C Flanagan
- Port of registry: 1831: Douglas; 1839: Liverpool; 1852: Dublin
- Builder: John Wood & Co, Port Glasgow
- Launched: 27 July 1831
- Completed: 1831
- Identification: UK official number 13398
- Fate: Scrapped 1864

General characteristics
- Tonnage: 1831: 150 GRT, 67 NRT; 1852: 125 GRT, 68 NRT
- Length: 103.2 ft (31.5 m)
- Beam: 15.8 ft (4.8 m)
- Depth: 9.1 ft (2.8 m)
- Installed power: 70 NHP
- Propulsion: side-lever steam engine, side paddles
- Speed: 9 knots (17 km/h; 10 mph)

SS Mona (I) - the first vessel in the Company's history to be so named - was a wooden paddle steamer that was operated by the Isle of Man Steam Packet Company.

== Building ==
John Wood & Co built Mona at Port Glasgow, launching her on 27 July 1831. Her registered length was 103.2 ft (31.5 m), her beam was 15.8 ft (4.8 m) and her depth was 9.1 ft (2.8 m). Her tonnages were 150 GRT and 67 NRT.

Robert Napier and Sons of Glasgow built her engine, which was a side-lever steam engine driving side paddles. Its working pressure was 15 pounds per square inch (100 kPa), it was rated at 70 NHP, and it gave her a speed of 9 knots (17 km/h; 10 mph).

== IoMSP career ==
Mona was the second ship to enter service with the Isle of Man Steam Packet Company. She was hurriedly ordered for the winter service in place of the larger Mona's Isle, which was soon considered too valuable to risk in storm conditions.

Mona started on the Company's service to Whitehaven, and then began winter service to Liverpool in October 1832.

Faster than Mona's Isle, she cut the Douglas – Liverpool run to seven hours, and once made passage from Douglas to Whitehaven in four hours and 35 minutes.

== Steam tug ==
Mona was the smallest ship in the IoMSP fleet. After less than 10 years service she was bought by a C Drinkwater, possibly in 1839 when her port of registration was changed from Douglas to Liverpool. The Liverpool Steam Tug Company bought her in 1841 to use as a tug.

In 1852 James Ward, Hugh Sheridan and Charles Flanagan bought her and registered her in Dublin. Her tonnages were revised to 125 GRT and 68 NRT. After the Merchant Shipping Act 1854 was passed, her official number was 13398. She was scrapped in 1864.

== Bibliography ==
- Chappell, Connery (1980). Island Lifeline. T Stephenson & Sons Ltd. ISBN 0-901314-20-X.
- Henry, Fred (1962). Ships of the Isle of Man Steam Packet Company. Glasgow: Brown, Son & Ferguson.
