= Elizabeth Quaile =

Irish-born American music educator and pianist (1874–1951)

- Born: January 20, 1874; Omagh, County Tyrone, Northern Ireland
- Died: June 30, 1951 (aged 77)
- Occupations: Pianist; music educator

Elizabeth Quaile (January 20, 1874 – June 30, 1951) was an American piano pedagogue of Irish birth.

== Early life and education ==
A native of Omagh, County Tyrone, Quaile emigrated to the United States early in her life; she settled in New York City, and undertook studies with Franklin Robinson before turning to teaching.

== Career and further study ==
From 1916 until 1919, she chaired the piano department of the David Mannes School in Manhattan; she then traveled to Paris for more study, taking lessons with pianist Harold Bauer.

In 1921, she returned to New York City, founding the Diller-Quaile School of Music with Angela Diller that same year.

Quaile, sometimes together with Diller, produced a number of books and other works to be used in the teaching of piano, many of which saw much success.

== See also ==
- List of Irish musicians
- List of Irish writers
- List of women writers
