= Tyrconnell (disambiguation) =

Tyrconnell is a former state in north-west Ireland.

Tyrconnell or Tyrconnel may also refer to:

== People ==
- Earl of Tyrconnell in the Peerage of Ireland
- Viscount Tyrconnel in the Peerage of Ireland

== Places ==
- Tyrconnell (Towson, Maryland), a historic home located in Baltimore County, Maryland, United States
- Tyrconnel, Queensland, a locality in Australia
- Tyrconnel Mine and Battery, a heritage-listed former gold mine in Shire of Mareeba, Queensland

== Other ==
- Tyrconnell (whiskey), a brand of single malt Irish whiskey
- SS Tyrconnel (1892), a coastal cargo vessel
