= Ben-my-Chree =

Ben-my-Chree (meaning "girl of my heart" in the Manx language) may refer to six ships of the Isle of Man Steam Packet Company:

- SS Ben-my-Chree (1845)
- SS Ben-my-Chree (1875)
- SS Ben-my-Chree (1908) converted to HMS Ben-my-Chree, seaplane carrier; sunk in 1917
- SS Ben-my-Chree (1927)
- SS Ben-my-Chree (1965)
- MS Ben-my-Chree (1998)
