= Royal Mail Ship =

Prefix for ships that carry mail under contract by the British Royal Mail

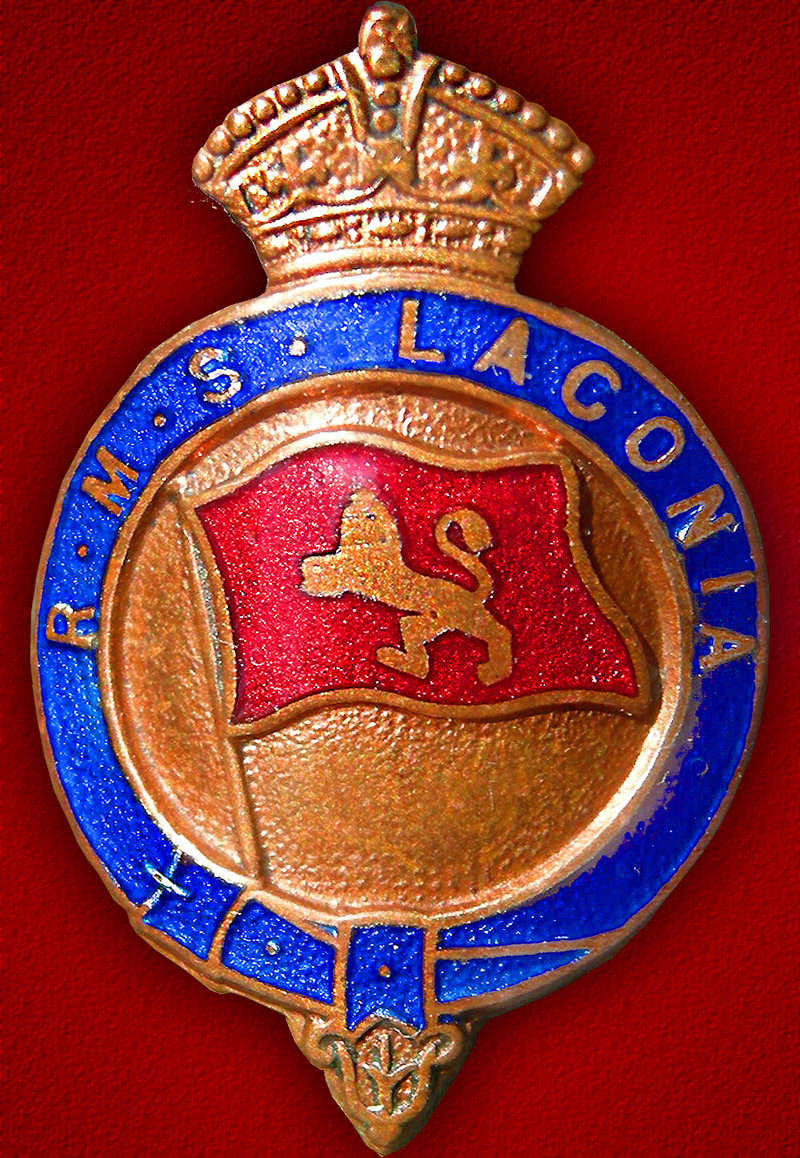
RMS "Crown" as displayed by the Cunard liner Laconia

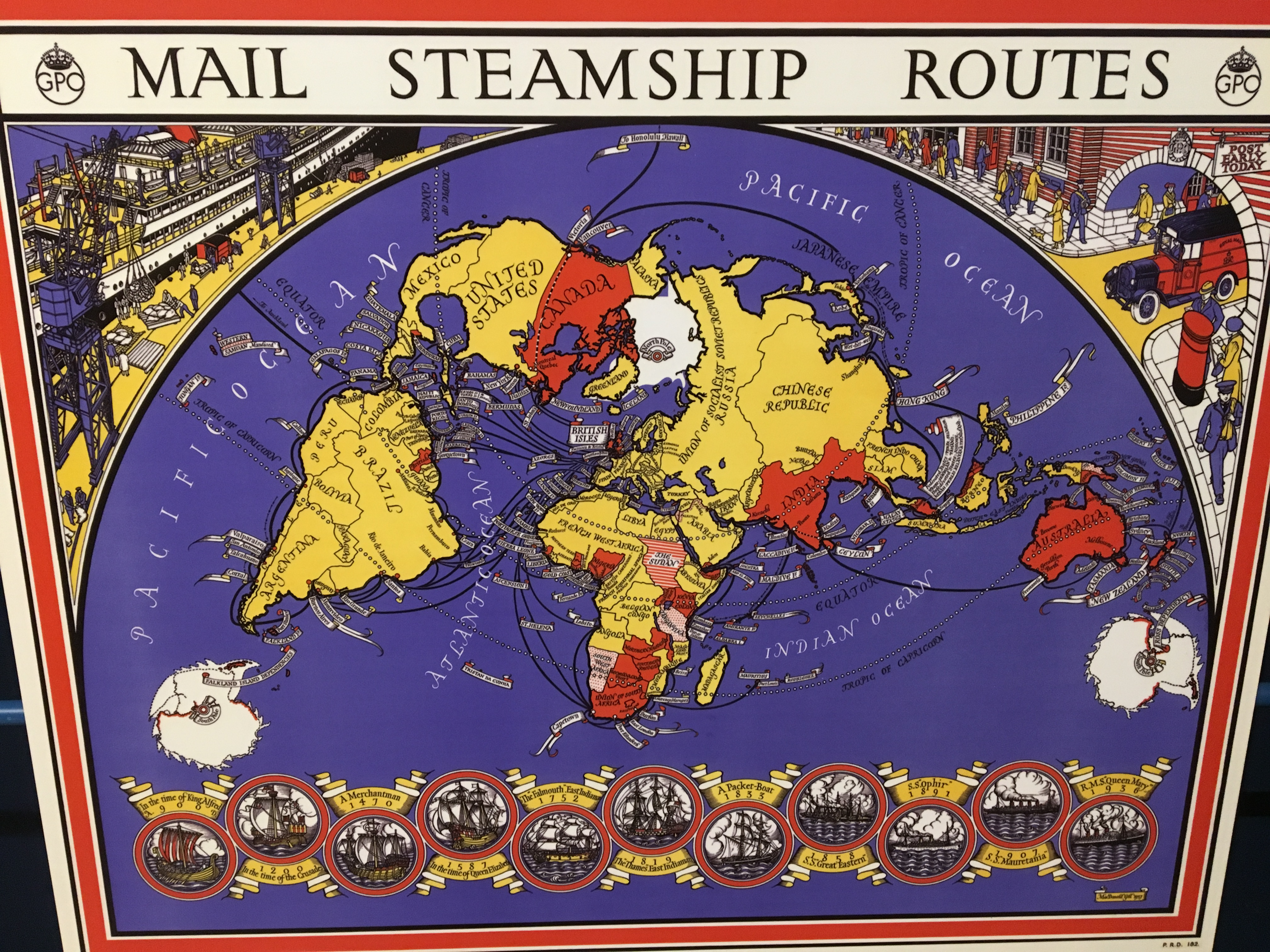
Royal Mail steamship routes

Royal Mail Ship (sometimes Steam-ship or Steamer), usually seen in its abbreviated form RMS, is the ship prefix used for seagoing vessels that carry mail under contract to the British Royal Mail. The designation dates back to 1840. Any vessel designated as "RMS" has the right both to fly the pennant of the Royal Mail when sailing and to include the Royal Mail "crown" insignia with any identifying device and/or design for the ship.

It was used by many shipping lines, but is often associated in particular with the White Star Line, Cunard, Royal Mail Lines, Union-Castle Line, Canadian Pacific Line, Orient Line and the P&O, which held a number of high-profile mail contracts, and traditionally prefixed the names of many of their ships with the initials "RMS".

While some lines in the past, particularly the Royal Mail Lines, called all their ships "RMS", technically a ship would use the prefix only while contracted to carry mail, and would revert at other times to a standard designation such as "SS".

== History ==
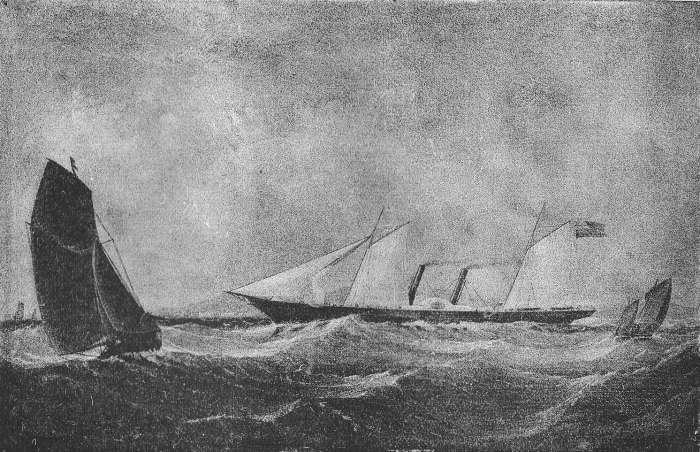
RMS Prince Arthur

Originally, the British Admiralty operated these ships.

The designation "RMS" has been used since 1840. In 1850 contracts were awarded to private companies. Having the title "RMS" was seen as a mark of quality and a competitive advantage, because the mail had to be on time.

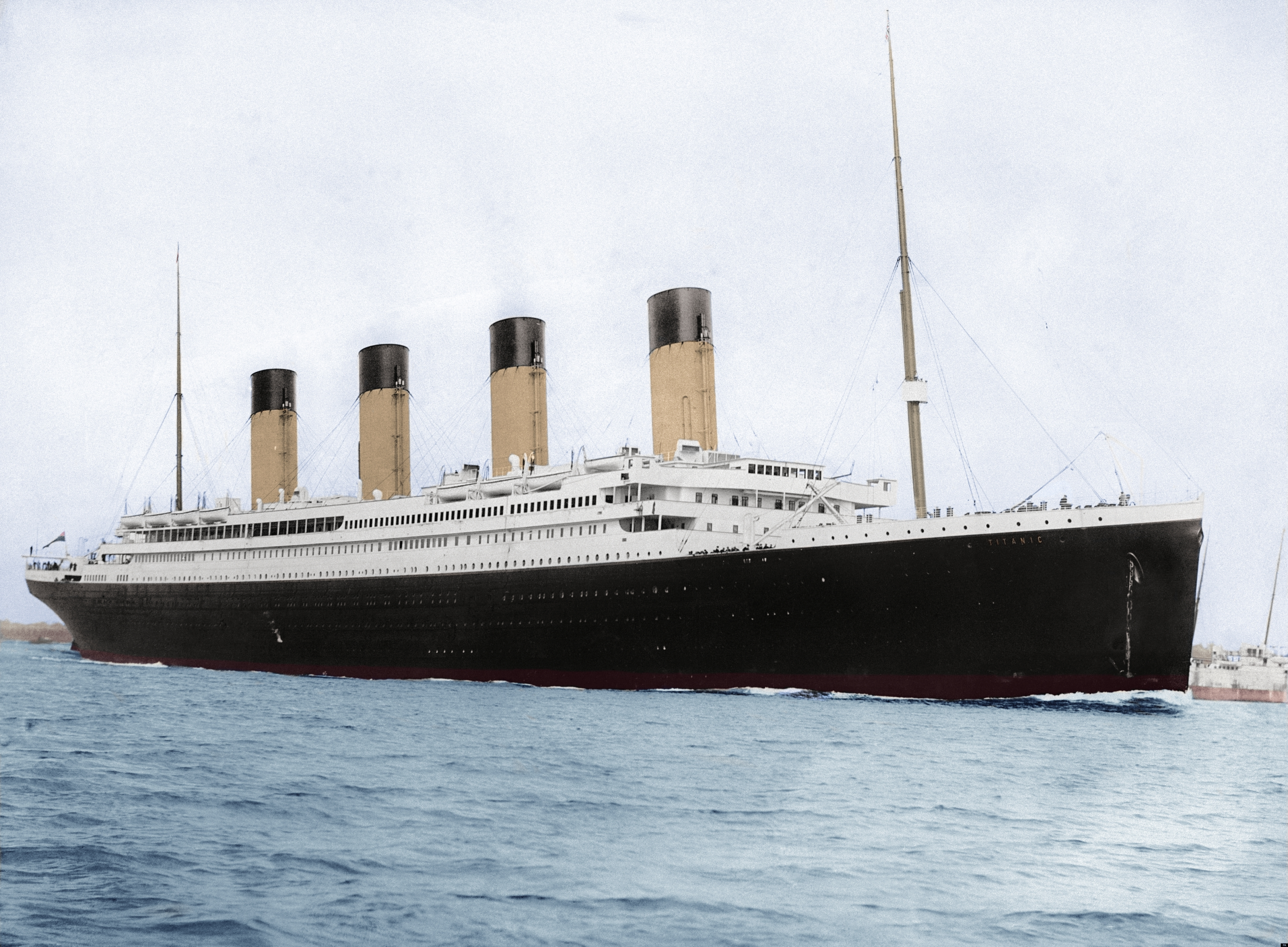
RMS Titanic

The most valuable route, with the highest volume, was between Kingstown (now Dún Laoghaire), in Ireland, and Holyhead in Wales. The City of Dublin Steam Packet Company (CDSPCo) won the contract. They bought RMS St Columba and RMS Llewellyn from the Admiralty to supplement their Prince Arthur. In the CDSPCo contract, in 1860, there was a penalty clause of £1 1s 4d for every minute's delay.

The Canadian Pacific's trans-Pacific Royal Mail contract required the building of the first three of a fleet of steamships: the RMS Empress of China, RMS Empress of India and RMS Empress of Japan which regularly sailed between Vancouver and Asia beginning in 1891. The RMS designation was also used on the ships of the White Star, P&O and Cunard lines of the 19th and 20th centuries. The most famous liner with the RMS title was the RMS Titanic.

== Modern times ==
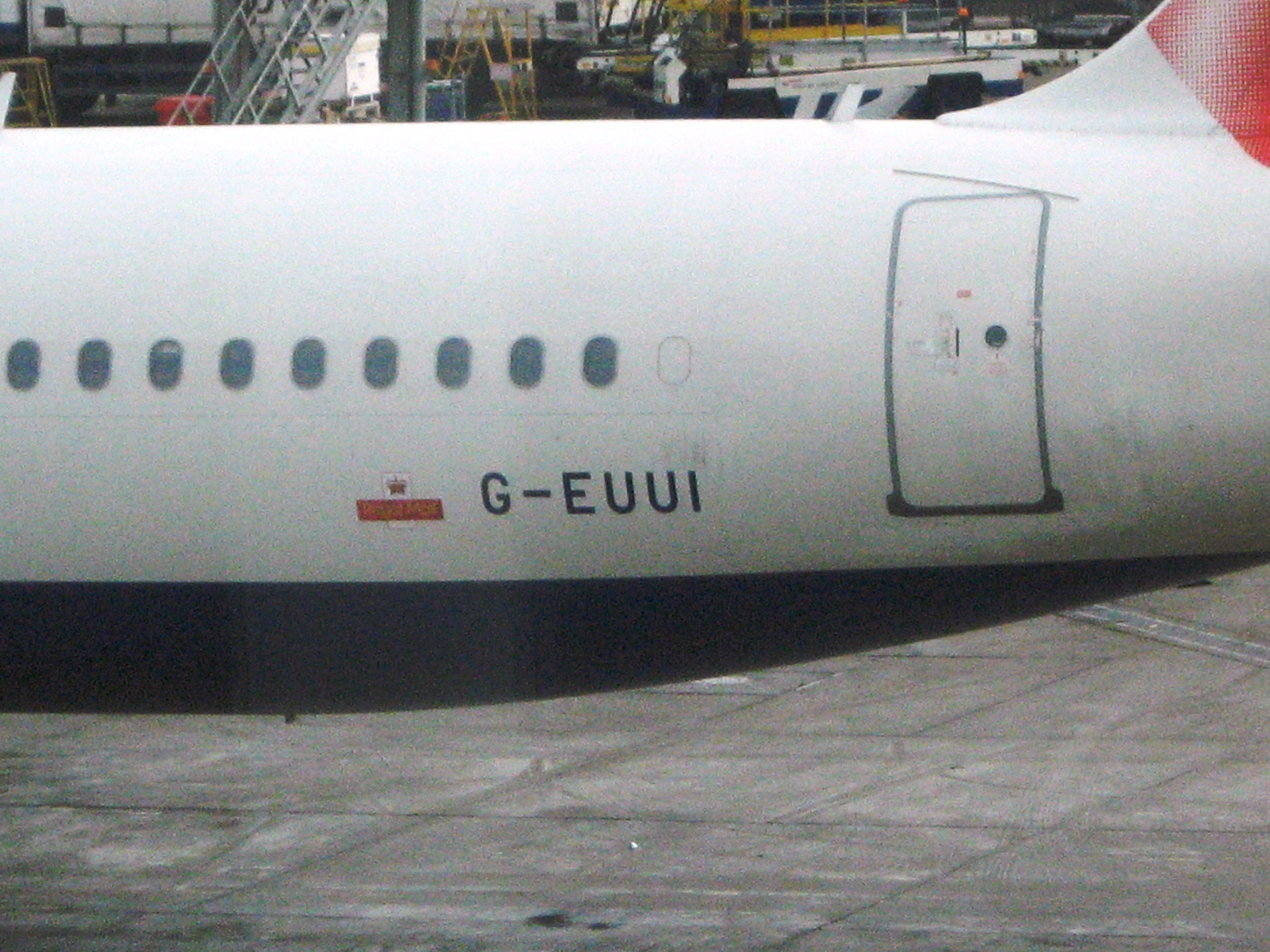
Royal Mail aircraft-marking; on a British Airways Airbus A320-232 G-EUUI

In recent years the shift to air transport for mail has left only three ships with the right to the prefix or its variations: RMS Segwun, which serves as a passenger vessel in Gravenhurst, Ontario, Canada; RMV Scillonian III, which serves the Isles of Scilly; and RMS Queen Mary 2. The "RMS" prefix was granted to QM2 by Royal Mail when she entered service in 2004 on the Southampton to New York route as a gesture to Cunard's history.

The Royal Mail continues a form of this tradition on modern day airliners. The UK's flag carrier airline, British Airways, is contracted to carry mail on some of its scheduled long-distance routes. Aircraft operating these routes with the facilities to carry mail are allowed to display the Royal Mail's logo and crest on their fuselage, usually alongside their registration markings.

== Other designations ==
The less-common designations RMMV for Royal Mail Motor Vessel and RMMS for Royal Mail Motor Ship, were used for a period when RMS was restricted to steam-ships. Motor Vessel and Motor Ship indicated that propulsion was provided by diesel rather than steam.

The RMV Scillonian III carries the designation RMV for Royal Mail Vessel and is the only active RMV.

== List of current Royal Mail Ships ==
Name	Line	In service	Status
Scillonian III	Isles of Scilly Steamship Company	1977	Was retired on 8 November 2026. Officially designated Royal Mail Vessel but has the status of Royal Mail Ship.
Queen Mary 2	Cunard	2004	Conferred the status of Royal Mail Ship as a gesture to Cunard's history but does not carry mail for the British postal service. However, a traditional red Royal Mail postbox is available to all passengers wishing to post letters aboard and the same is emptied by the crew at every call at Southampton, the ship's home port, and forwarded ashore. Queen Mary 2 is currently in active service as an ocean liner.
Segwun	Muskoka Lakes Navigation Co	1887	Built as SS Nipissing, then as Segwun 1925, out of service from 1958 to 1981; restored 1972–1981 and returned to service since 1981. The only remaining steam-powered Royal Mail Ship.

== List of past Royal Mail Ships ==
Service dates are the years with the status of Royal Mail Ship. Those highlighted are still in service with the status of Royal Mail Ship.

Name	Line	In service	Left service	Status
Adriatic	White Star	1907	1934	Scrapped
Alaunia	Cunard	1913	1916	Sunk by mine
Alaunia	Cunard	1925	1957	Scrapped
Alaunia	Cunard	1960	1969	Sold 1969 to Brocklebank Line and renamed as Malancha, sold again in 1971 to Panama as Humi Nastta and fate unknown
Albania	Cunard	1911	1930	Built in 1900 as Consuelo, bought by Cunard 1911 & renamed Albania, sold 1912 & renamed Poleric, scrapped 1930
Alcantara	Royal Mail Steam Packet Company	1913	1916	Sunk by enemy action
Alcantara	Royal Mail Steam Packet Company, later Royal Mail Lines	1926	1958	Scrapped
Almanzora	Royal Mail Steam Packet Company	1906	1948	Scrapped
Amanda	Pickford & Black	—	—	—
Amazon	Royal Mail Steam Packet Company	1906	1916	Sunk by enemy action
Andania	Cunard	1913	1918	Sunk by enemy action
Andania	Cunard	1921	1940	Sunk by enemy action
Andes	Royal Mail Steam Packet Company	1913	1929	Scrapped after finishing career as the cruise ship Atlantis
Andes	Royal Mail Lines	1939	1959	Scrapped in 1971 after finishing career as a cruise ship
Antonia	Cunard	1921	1948	Scrapped
Aquitania	Cunard	1914	1950	Scrapped
Arabia	P&O	1898	1916	Sunk by enemy action
Aragon	Royal Mail Steam Packet Company	1905	1917	Sunk by enemy action
Arlanza	Royal Mail Steam Packet Company	1912	1938	Scrapped
Arundel Castle	Union-Castle	1921	1959	Scrapped
Ascania	Cunard	1923	1957	Scrapped
Asturias	Royal Mail Steam Packet Company	1925	1957	Scrapped
Aurania	Cunard	1881	1905	Scrapped
Aurania	Cunard	1916	1918	Sunk by enemy action
Aurania	Cunard	1924	1961	Scrapped
Ausonia	Cunard	1921	1965	Scrapped
Avon	Royal Mail Steam Packet Company	1906 and 1919	1914 and 1929	Converted as troopship in 1914, then as armed merchant cruiser 1915 and renamed HMS Avoca, return to owners and renamed Avon in 1919; scrapped 1930
Baltic	White Star	1904	1933	Scrapped
Ben-my-Chree	Isle of Man Steam Packet Company	1845	1860	Wrecked
Ben-my-Chree	Isle of Man Steam Packet Company	1875	1906	Scrapped
Ben-my-Chree	Isle of Man Steam Packet Company	1908	1915	Sunk by enemy action
Ben-my-Chree	Isle of Man Steam Packet Company	1927	1965	Scrapped
Ben-my-Chree	Isle of Man Steam Packet Company	1966	1984	Scrapped
Ben-my-Chree	Isle of Man Steam Packet Company	1998	2008	Currently on active service as RO/PAX vessel
Berengaria	Cunard	1913	1938	Scrapped
Britannia	Cunard	1840	1880	Sunk
Britannic	White Star	1874	1903	Scrapped
Britannic	White Star	1915	1916	Sunk by mine
Britannic	White Star	1929	1960	Scrapped
Bulimba	British India Steam Navigation Company	1886	1922	Built 1881, sold to China in 1882, scrapped in 1933.
Capetown Castle	Union-Castle	1937	1966	Scrapped
Campania	Cunard	1891	1918	Sank after collision with HMS Glorious
Carinthia	Cunard	1925	1940	Sunk by enemy action
Carinthia	Cunard	1956	1968	Sold 1968; renamed Fairland; scrapped 2006
Carmania	Cunard	1905	1932	Scrapped
Carnarvon Castle	Union-Castle	1926 and 1950	1939 and 1963	Commissioned as HMS Carnarvon Castle from 1939 to 1947.
Carpathia	Cunard	1903	1918	Sunk by enemy action
Caronia	Cunard	1905	1933	Scrapped
Caronia	Cunard White Star	1948	1974	Scrapped
Celtic	White Star	1901	1933	Scrapped
Cedric	White Star	1903	1932	Scrapped
Columba	David MacBrayne	1879	1936	Scrapped
Columba	David MacBrayne	1964	1968	Owned by the Secretary of State for Scotland, chartered to David MacBrayne. Renamed MV Columba in 1968. Currently in active service as Hebridean Princess.
Doric	White Star	1923	1935	Scrapped after collision with the Formigny
Douglas	Isle of Man Steam Packet Company	1858	1862	Sold to Cunard, Wilson and Co. Later scrapped
Douglas	Isle of Man Steam Packet Company	1864	1888	Scrapped
Douglas	Isle of Man Steam Packet Company	1901	1923	Sunk after collision with Artemisia
Dunottar Castle	Union-Castle	1890	1915	Sunk during bad weather
Durham Castle	Union-Castle	1904	1940	Sunk by mine
Ebro	Royal Mail Steam Packet Company	1914	1954	Scrapped after becoming NT Serpa Pinto
Ellan Vannin	Castletown Steam Navigation Company	1854	1858	Sold to the Government of Sardinia, renamed Archimedes
Ellan Vannin	Isle of Man Steam Packet Company	1883	1909	Sunk during bad weather in the River Mersey, December, 1909
Empress of Asia	Canadian Pacific	1913	1942	Sunk by enemy action
Empress of Australia	Canadian Pacific	1922	1952	Scrapped
Empress of Australia	Canadian Pacific	1953	1956	Scrapped
Empress of Britain	Canadian Pacific	1906	1930	Scrapped
Empress of Britain	Canadian Pacific	1931	1940	Sunk by enemy action
Empress of Britain	Canadian Pacific	1956	1965	Scrapped
Empress of Canada	Canadian Pacific	1922	1943	Sunk by enemy action
Empress of Canada	Canadian Pacific	1929	1953	Scrapped
Empress of Canada	Canadian Pacific	1961	2003	Scrapped
Empress of China	Canadian Pacific	1891	1912	Scrapped
Empress of England	Canadian Pacific	1957	1970	Scrapped
Empress of France	Canadian Pacific	1914	1931	Scrapped
Empress of India	Canadian Pacific	1891	1919	Scrapped
Empress of India	Canadian Pacific	1908	1928	Scrapped
Empress of Ireland	Canadian Pacific	1906	1914	Sunk after collision with SS Storstad
Empress of Japan	Canadian Pacific	1930	1966	Scrapped after fire
Empress of Russia	Canadian Pacific	1913	1945	Scrapped after fire
Empress of Scotland	Canadian Pacific	1906	1930	Scrapped
Empress of Scotland	Canadian Pacific	1930	1966	Scrapped after fire
Empress Queen	Isle of Man Steam Packet Company	1897	1916	Foundered on the Ring Rocks off Bembridge, Isle of Wight, February, 1916
Etruria	Cunard	1885	1909	Scrapped
Fenella	Isle of Man Steam Packet Company	1881	1929	Scrapped
Fenella	Isle of Man Steam Packet Company	1937	1940	Sunk by enemy action at the Dunkirk evacuation.
Fenella	Isle of Man Steam Packet Company	1951	1973	Sold 1973 and renamed Vasso M. Sank off Damietta, 2 February 1977
Franconia	Cunard	1922	1956	Scrapped
Franconia	Cunard	1963	1971	Previously Ivernia.
Germanic	White Star	1875	1950	Scrapped
Georgic	White Star	1933	1954	Scrapped
Homeric	White Star	1922	1935	Scrapped
Ivernia	Cunard	1955	1971	Renamed RMS Franconia 1963, sold 1973 and renamed Feodor Shalyapin; scrapped 2004
Kenya Castle	Union-Castle	1951	1967	Sold to Chandris of Greece and renamed Amerikanis; used until 1996 and sold after 2000 and scrapped 2001
King Orry	Isle of Man Steam Packet Company	1842	1858	Sold 1858
King Orry	Isle of Man Steam Packet Company	1871	1912	Scrapped
King Orry	Isle of Man Steam Packet Company	1913	1940	Sunk by enemy action at the Dunkirk evacuation
King Orry	Isle of Man Steam Packet Company	1946	1975	Scrapped
King Orry	Isle of Man Steam Packet Company	1990	1998	Sold 1998
Knight of Malta	Cassar Co. Ltd.	1929	1941	Wrecked
Laconia	Cunard	1912	1917	Sunk by enemy action
Laconia	Cunard	1922	1942	Sunk by enemy action
Lady Drake	Canadian National	1928	1942	Sunk by enemy action
Lady Hawkins	Canadian National	1928	1942	Sunk by enemy action
Lady Nelson	Canadian National	1928	1939	Acquired as hospital ship and later as troop ship by Royal Canadian Navy; returned to CN 1946; retired by CN 1952 and sold to Egypt as Gumhuryat Misr for Khedivial Mail Line, renamed Alwadi in 1960; broken up in Egypt 1968
Lady Rodney	Canadian National	1929	1953	Sold to Khedivial Mail Line and renamed Mecca, then to United Arab Maritime Company in 1961; scuttled in Egypt 1967
Lady Somers	Canadian National	1929	1940	Acquired by RN 1940 and sunk in Atlantic Ocean about 400 kilometres (250 mi) east of Ponta Delgada, Azores 1941
Lady of Mann	Isle of Man Steam Packet Company	1930	1971	Scrapped
Lady of Mann	Isle of Man Steam Packet Company	1976	2005	Sold 2005
Lancastria	Cunard	1920	1940	Sunk by enemy action
Leinster	City of Dublin SP	1896	1918	Sunk by enemy action
Llandovery Castle	Union-Castle	1914	1918	Sunk by enemy action
Lucania	Cunard	1893	1909	Scrapped after fire
Lusitania	Cunard	1907	1915	Sunk after being torpedoed by SM U-20
Majestic	White Star	1922	1940	Scrapped
Maloja	P&O	1923	1954	Scrapped
Manxman	Isle of Man Steam Packet Company	1920	1940	Scrapped
Manxman	Isle of Man Steam Packet Company	1955	1982	Scrapped
Manx Maid	Isle of Man Steam Packet Company	1923	1950	Scrapped
Manx Maid	Isle of Man Steam Packet Company	1962	1984	Scrapped
Manx Viking	Isle of Man Steam Packet Company	1978	1987	Sold 1987
Mauretania	Cunard White Star	1906	1935	Scrapped
Mauretania	Cunard White Star	1939	1965	Scrapped
Medina	P&O	1911	1917	Sunk by enemy action
Mona	Isle of Man Steam Packet Company	1832	1841	Sold 1841
Mona	Isle of Man Steam Packet Company	1878	1883	Sunk in the Formby Channel, after being struck by the SS Rita
Mona	Isle of Man Steam Packet Company	1903	1909	Scrapped
Mona	Isle of Man Steam Packet Company	1919	1938	Scrapped
Mona's Isle	Isle of Man Steam Packet Company	1830	1851	Scrapped
Mona's Isle	Isle of Man Steam Packet Company	1860	1883	Converted to screw propulsion and renamed Ellan Vannin, sank 1909 in River Mersey
Mona's Isle	Isle of Man Steam Packet Company	1882	1915	Scrapped
Mona's Isle	Isle of Man Steam Packet Company	1905	1948	Scrapped
Mona's Isle	Isle of Man Steam Packet Company	1950	1980	Scrapped
Mona's Isle	Isle of Man Steam Packet Company	1984	1986	Sold 1986 and renamed Al Fahad; wrecked off Jeddah, June 2004
Mona's Queen	Isle of Man Steam Packet Company	1853	1880	Scrapped
Mona's Queen	Isle of Man Steam Packet Company	1885	1929	Recommissioned in 1915; returned to service in 1919; Scrapped by Smith & Company in Port Glasgow, 1929
Mona's Queen	Isle of Man Steam Packet Company	1934	1940	Sunk by enemy action
Mona's Queen	Isle of Man Steam Packet Company	1946	1962	Scrapped in 1981
Mona's Queen	Isle of Man Steam Packet Company	1972	1995	Scrapped in 2008
Mooltan	P&O	1923	1953	Scrapped
Newfoundland	Johnston Warren Lines	1925	1943	Burnt out by enemy action
Niagara	Union Steamship Co of NZ	1912	1940	Sunk by enemy action
Nova Scotia	Johnston Warren Lines	1926	1942	Sunk by enemy action
Oceanic	White Star	1899	1914	Scrapped
Olympic	White Star	1911	1935	Scrapped
Orama	Orient Line	1911	1917	Torpedoed by SM U-62 south of Western Approaches
Orama	Orient Line	1924	1940	Sunk by the German cruiser Admiral Hipper off Norway
Orizaba	Orient Line	1886	1905	Wrecked off Garden Island, Fremantle
Ormuz	Orient Line	1886	1912	Sold to Cie de Nav. Sud-Atlantique, renamed SS Divona; last owned by Union Industrielle Et Maritime (U.I.M) and scuttled in 1942 off Bizerta, Tunisia, raised and scrapped in 1946
Ormuz	Orient Line	1920	1927	ex-Zeppelin, 1920 renamed Ormuz, 1927 sold to North German Lloyd, renamed Dresden.
Orontes	Orient Line	1902	1916	Lost RMS status in 1916–1917 while serving as a troopship. Laid up in 1921. Sold in 1922 and became the exhibition ship SS British Trade. Repossessed by Orient Line later the same year and reverted to Orontes (although not with the status of RMS). Scrapped in 1926.
Orotava	Orient Line	1889	1906	Served as a troop ship between 1899 and 1903 as a troopship during the Second Boer War. Scrapped.
Oruba	Orient Line	1889	1906	Scrapped.
Otranto	Orient Line	1926 and 1948	1939 and 1957	Served as troop ship HMTS Otranto during World War II. Sold to the British Iron & Steel Corporation as scrap and broken up at Faslane.
Peel Castle	Isle of Man Steam Packet Company	1912	1939	Scrapped
Pendennis Castle	Union-Castle	1959	1980	Scrapped
Persia	Cunard	1855	1872	Scrapped
Peveril	Isle of Man Steam Packet Company	1884	1899	Sank off Douglas after a collision with SS Monarch 16 September 1899
Peveril	Isle of Man Steam Packet Company	1929	1964	Scrapped
Port Kingston	Imperial Direct West Mail Co	1904	1911	Sold to Union Steamship Co of NZ; renamed Tahiti; sank 1930
Prince of Wales	Isle of Man Steam Packet Company	1888	1915	Scrapped
Queen Elizabeth	Cunard White Star	1947	1968	Launched in 1940 and served as a troop ship until 1946. Scrapped after arson fire.
Queen Mary	Cunard White Star	1936 and 1947	1940 and 1967	Served as a troop ship from 1940 to 1946. Decommissioned in 1967; currently restaurant/hotel/museum in Long Beach, California
Queen of the Isle	Isle of Man Steam Packet Company	1834	1845	Sold 1845; eventually reported lost off the Falkland Islands
Queen Victoria	Isle of Man Steam Packet Company	1888	1915	Scrapped
Quetta	British-India SN Co	1881	1890	Wrecked
Ramsey Town	Isle of Man Steam Packet Company	1904	1936	Scrapped
Remuera	New Zealand Shipping Co	1911	1940	Sunk by enemy action
Republic	Oceanic Steam Navigation d/b/a White Star Line	1903	1909	Sunk after collision with another ship
Rotorua	New Zealand Shipping Co	1910	1917	Sunk by enemy action
Rhone	Royal Mail Steam Packet Company	1865	1867	Wrecked
Royal Adelaide	City of Dublin SP	1838	1849	Sank
Rushen Castle	Isle of Man Steam Packet Company	1898	1947	Scrapped
Samaria	Cunard	1920	1956	Scrapped
Saxonia	Cunard	1900	1925	Scrapped
Saxonia	Cunard	1954	1999	In 1962 renamed Carmania; in 1973 sold & renamed Leonid Sobinov, scrapped 1999
St Helena	HM Government	1977	1990	Ex-Northland Prince. Lost RMS status in 1990 and renamed St Helena Island. Renamed Avalon in 1990 and Indooceanique in 1993. Scrapped in 1996.
St Helena	HM Government	1990	2018	Last ocean-crossing ship in regular mail-carrying service. Used as headquarters for the Extreme E racing series.
Scillonian	Isles of Scilly SC	1926	1955	Scrapped
Scillonian	Isles of Scilly SC	1955	1977	Sold and eventually sank after owner abandoned her in 2004
Scotia	Cunard	1861	1904	Wrecked
Scythia I	Cunard	1874	1899	Scrapped
Scythia II	Cunard	1921	1958	Scrapped
Servia	Cunard	1881	1901	Scrapped
Slavonia	British-India SN Co	1902	1909	Wrecked
Snaefell	Isle of Man Steam Packet Company	1863	1875	Sold 1875
Snaefell	Isle of Man Steam Packet Company	1876	1904	Scrapped
Snaefell	Isle of Man Steam Packet Company	1910	1918	Sunk by enemy action
Snaefell	Isle of Man Steam Packet Company	1920	1945	Scrapped 1948
Snaefell	Isle of Man Steam Packet Company	1948	1978	Scrapped 1978
Snaefell	Isle of Man Steam Packet Company	2006	2011	Built 1991, acquired 2006, sold 2011.
Southampton Castle	Union-Castle	1965	1978	Sold to Cost Armatori of Italy with Good Hope Castle and renamed Paola C; scrapped in China 1984
Strathaird	P&O	1931	1961	RMS status removed in 1954 and renamed SS Strathaird. Scrapped.
Strathnaver	P&O	1931	1962	RMS status removed in 1954 and renamed SS Strathnaver. Scrapped.
Sylvania	Cunard	1957	2004	Sold 1968 & renamed Fairwind; scrapped 2004
Tahiti	Union Steamship Co of NZ	1911	1930	Hull holed by broken propeller; sank
Tayleur	White Star (not OSNC)	1853	1853	Ran aground
The Ramsey	Isle of Man Steam Packet Company	1895	1915	Sunk by enemy action
Titanic	White Star	1912	1912	Sunk after collision with iceberg
Transvaal Castle	Union-Castle	1961	2000	Sold 1966 to Safmarine and renamed "SA Vaal"; left Royal Mail service 1969; scrapped 2003
Trent	Royal Mail SP	1841	1865	Scrapped
Tynwald	Isle of Man Steam Packet Company	1846	1886	Sold 1866
Tynwald	Isle of Man Steam Packet Company	1886	1888	Sold 1888
Tynwald	Isle of Man Steam Packet Company	1891	1934	Sold 1934
Tynwald	Isle of Man Steam Packet Company	1936	1939	Sunk by enemy action
Tynwald	Isle of Man Steam Packet Company	1947	1974	Scrapped 1975
Tynwald	Isle of Man Steam Packet Company	1986	1990	Sold and left Royal Mail service 1990; scrapped 2007
Tyrconnel	Isle of Man Steam Packet Company	1911	1932	Scrapped
Umbria	Cunard	1884	1910	Scrapped
Viceroy of India	P&O	1927	1942	Sunk by enemy action
Victoria	Isle of Man Steam Packet Company	1907	1957	Scrapped
Victoria	East African Railways & Harbours	1961	1977	Lost status when EAR&H was dissolved; still in service as "MV Victoria"
Victorian	Allan Line	1904	1929	World's first steam turbine ocean liner; scrapped 1929
Viking	Isle of Man Steam Packet Company	1905	1954	Scrapped in 1954
Windsor Castle	Union-Castle	1922	1943	Sunk by enemy action
Windsor Castle	Union-Castle	1960	1998	Scrapped

== See also ==
- Mail steamer
- Steamboat
