= SS Mona (1878) =

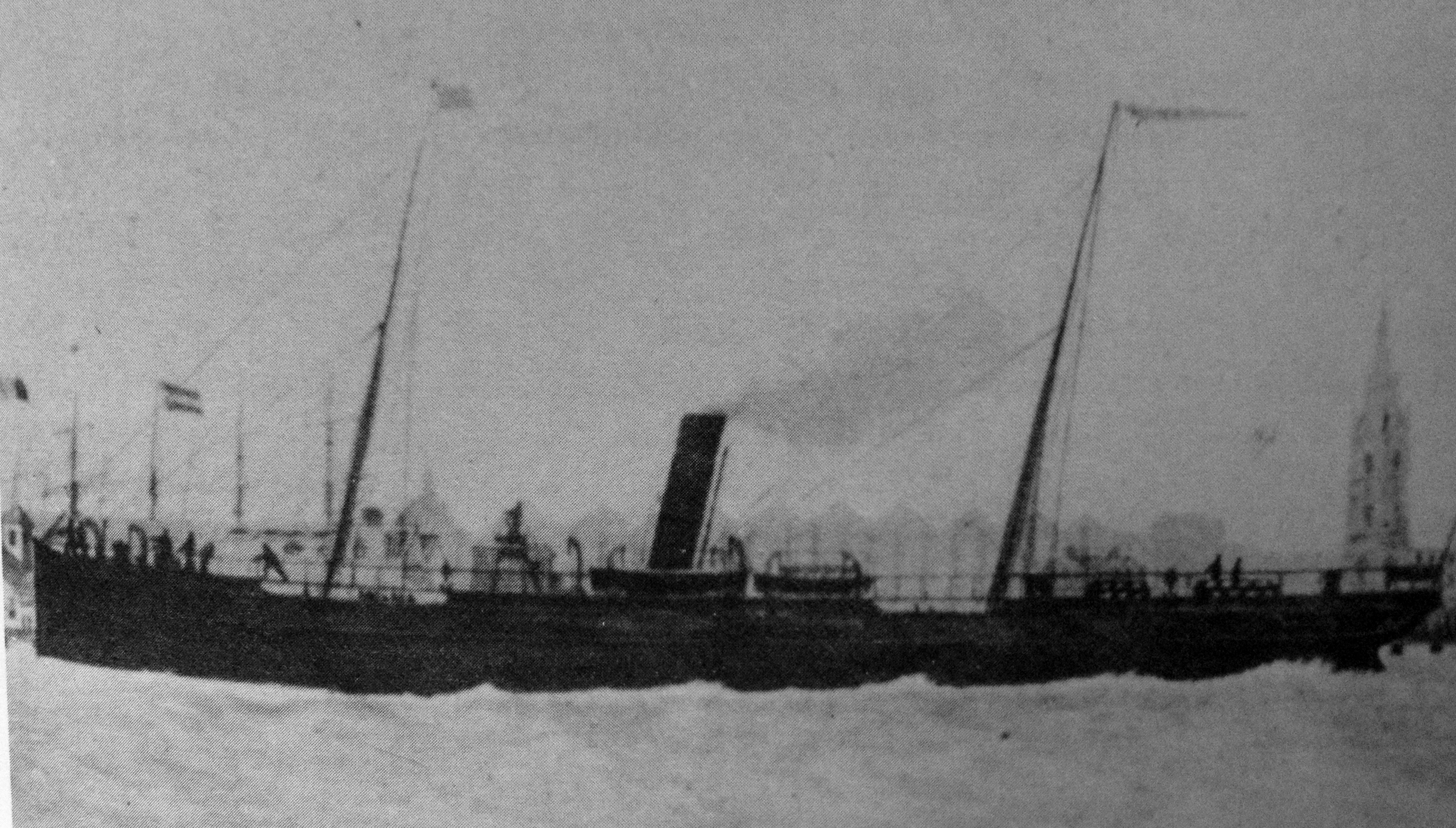
- RMS Mona

History
- Name: Mona
- Owner: 1878–1883: IOMSPCo
- Operator: 1878–1883: IOMSPCo
- Port of registry: Douglas, Isle of Man
- Builder: William Laird & Co., Birkenhead
- Cost: £19,500
- Launched: 31 May 1878
- In service: 1878
- Identification: Official Number 76302
- Fate: Sunk in collision 1883

General characteristics
- Type: Packet Steamer
- Tonnage: 526 later altered to 562 GRT
- Length: 200 feet (61 m)
- Beam: 26 feet (7.9 m)
- Depth: 13 feet (4.0 m)
- Installed power: Nominal 160 horsepower
- Propulsion: Screw (First vessel to be screw-driven in the Company's history).
- Speed: 13 knots (15 mph)

SS (RMS) Mona (II) No. 76302 (the second vessel in the line's history to be so named) was a packet steamer operated by the Isle of Man Steam Packet Company. Mona was the first screw-driven ship in the company's history.

== Construction & dimensions ==
Mona was built at Birkenhead by William Laird & Co., who also supplied her engines and boilers, and she was launched on Friday 31 May 1878. Length 200'; beam 26'; depth 13'. She had an original tonnage of 526 GRT but this was later increased to 562 gross registered tons. Mona's purchase cost was £19,500.

Mona had a nominal horsepower of 160 HP, and this gave her a speed of 13 knots.

== Service life ==
A passenger-cargo ship, Mona was an important vessel in the history of the Isle of Man Steam Packet Company. She was the line's first single-screw ship, but was also fitted with vertical compound steam engines. She proved much more economical to run and far better suited to winter service than the paddle steamers which had previously made up the company's fleet.

On 21 December 1878, she was involved in a collision with the steam barge Mersey at Liverpool and was severely damaged.

== Loss ==
Under the command of Captain James Brew, whilst Mona was lying at anchor in the Formby Channel (53°27′0″N 3°02′0″W) in the approaches to Liverpool in 1883, the Spanish steamer Rita collided with her. Mona sank almost immediately. Rita was outward bound from Liverpool, but she sustained damage in the collision that forced her to return to port. Mona's crew, together with two women who were the only passengers on board, took to the lifeboats and were saved, some being picked up by the Formby Lightship.

Ironically, in 1881, Hughes & Co., brokers of Liverpool, who had foreign customers for reasonably new screw steamers, had offered £18,000 for the vessel, but the Steam Packet refused - their price being £21,000.

== Bibliography ==
- Chappell, Connery (1980). Island Lifeline. T. Stephenson. ISBN 978-0-901314-20-8.
