= RMS Knight of Malta =

History

United Kingdom
- Name: Knight of Malta
- Owner: Cassar Co. Ltd.
- Operator: Cassar Co. Ltd. (1929–1940); Admiralty (1940–1941)
- Builder: Swan, Hunter & Wigham Richardson Ltd, Newcastle
- Yard number: 1360
- Launched: 2 October 1929
- Completed: December 1929
- In service: 21 February 1930
- Identification: Official Number: 155985
- Fate: Ran aground, 2–3 March 1941

General characteristics
- Type: Cargo liner
- Tonnage: 1553 GRT; 656 NRT
- Length: 260.5 ft (79.4 m)
- Beam: 37.3 ft (11.4 m)
- Draught: 17.9 ft (5.5 m)
- Installed power: Triple-expansion engine
- Propulsion: Screw propeller

RMS (or SS) (Note: Both the prefixes RMS (for Royal Mail Ship) and SS (for Screw Steamer) are used to refer to the Knight of Malta.) Knight of Malta was a cargo liner built by Swan, Hunter & Wigham Richardson Ltd in 1929. She was owned and operated by Cassar Co. Ltd. in Malta. During World War II, she was requisitioned by the Admiralty as an armed boarding vessel and stores carrier. She ran aground off Libya on the night of 2–3 March 1941, with no casualties.

== Description ==
The Knight of Malta had a tonnage of 1553 GRT or 656 NRT. She was 260.5 ft (79.4 m) long, and she had a beam of 37.3 ft (11.4 m) and a draught of 17.9 ft (5.5 m). The vessel had a triple-expansion engine, and she was propelled by a screw propeller.

== Career ==
The Knight of Malta was built by Swan, Hunter & Wigham Richardson Ltd at the Neptune Yard, Low Walker in Newcastle upon Tyne. She was launched on 2 October 1929 and was completed the following December. The vessel was owned by Cassar Co. Ltd. in Malta. The vessel entered service on 21 February 1930, and it operated between Malta and Syracuse or Tunis. The Knight of Malta was the first purpose-built vessel to operate on a Malta–Sicily route. The Knight of Malta had her own paquebot postmark which was applied to mail posted on board.

After World War II broke out, the vessel was requisitioned by the Admiralty in July 1940. She was initially an armed boarding vessel, but was later used as a stores carrier. The Knight of Malta was wrecked on the night of 2/3 March 1941. She was carrying troops from Alexandria to Tobruk, being escorted by the anti-submarine whaler HMSAS Southern Maid, when she ran aground 2 nautical miles (3.7 km; 2.3 mi) west of Ras Azzaz, Libya; there were no casualties. The destroyer HMS Wryneck was sent to determine the possibility of salvage, and the ship's cargo was recovered. On 8 March, the Egyptian steamer Star of Mex also ran aground nearby, but she was towed to Alexandria. Salvage of the Knight of Malta was abandoned on 10 March, after the corvette HMS Peony and the tug St Issey were attacked.

== Legacy ==
In 1986, the vessel was depicted on a Malta postage stamp and on a Lm5 silver commemorative coin.
