= RMS Orizaba =

Ship wrecked off the coast of Western Australia

Coordinates: 32.278613°S 115.624866°E

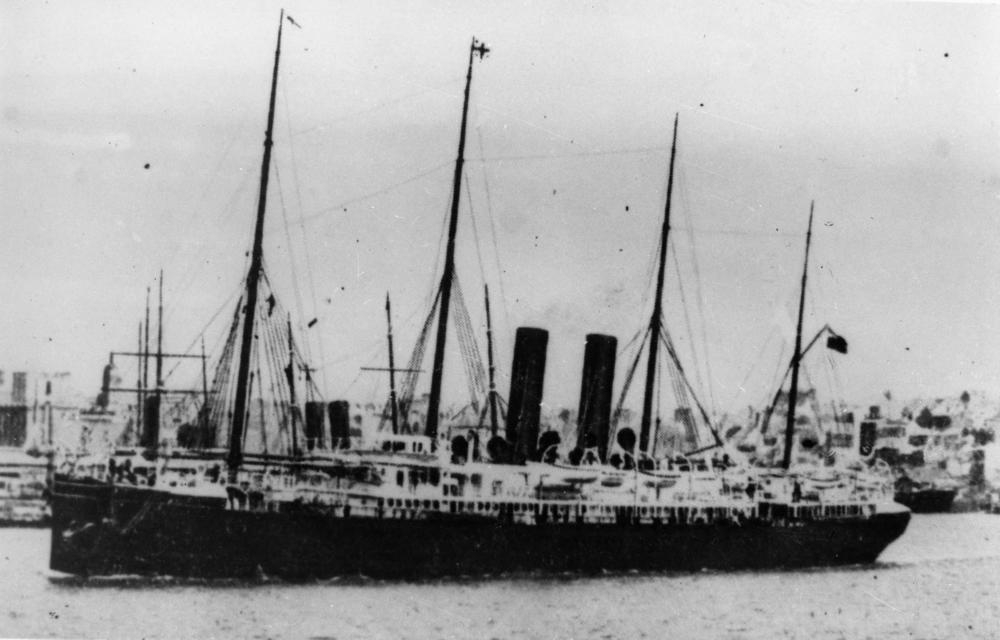

History
- Name: Orizaba
- Owner: Pacific Steam Navigation Company
- Operator: Orient Steam Navigation Company
- Builder: Barrow Ship Building Co, Barrow-in-Furness
- Yard number: 138
- Launched: 6 May 1886
- Fate: Wrecked, 1905

General characteristics
- Type: Royal Mail Ship
- Tonnage: 6,298
- Length: 148 metres (486 ft)
- Draft: 7.3 metres (24 ft)

RMS Orizaba was a Royal Mail Ship wrecked off Rockingham, Western Australia on 16 February 1905. On her approach to Fremantle, a smog of bushfire smoke was obscuring the coast and the captain lost his bearings. The ship went aground in 6.1 metres (20 ft) of water on Five Fathom Bank, west of Garden Island.

All 160 people on board were evacuated safely. It is one of the largest ships to be wrecked in Australian waters.

In 2014 the wreck was still in use as a dive site.

The ship was celebrated in music by Australian composers Alberto Zelman and Auguste Wiegand, in their gavotte of the same name.

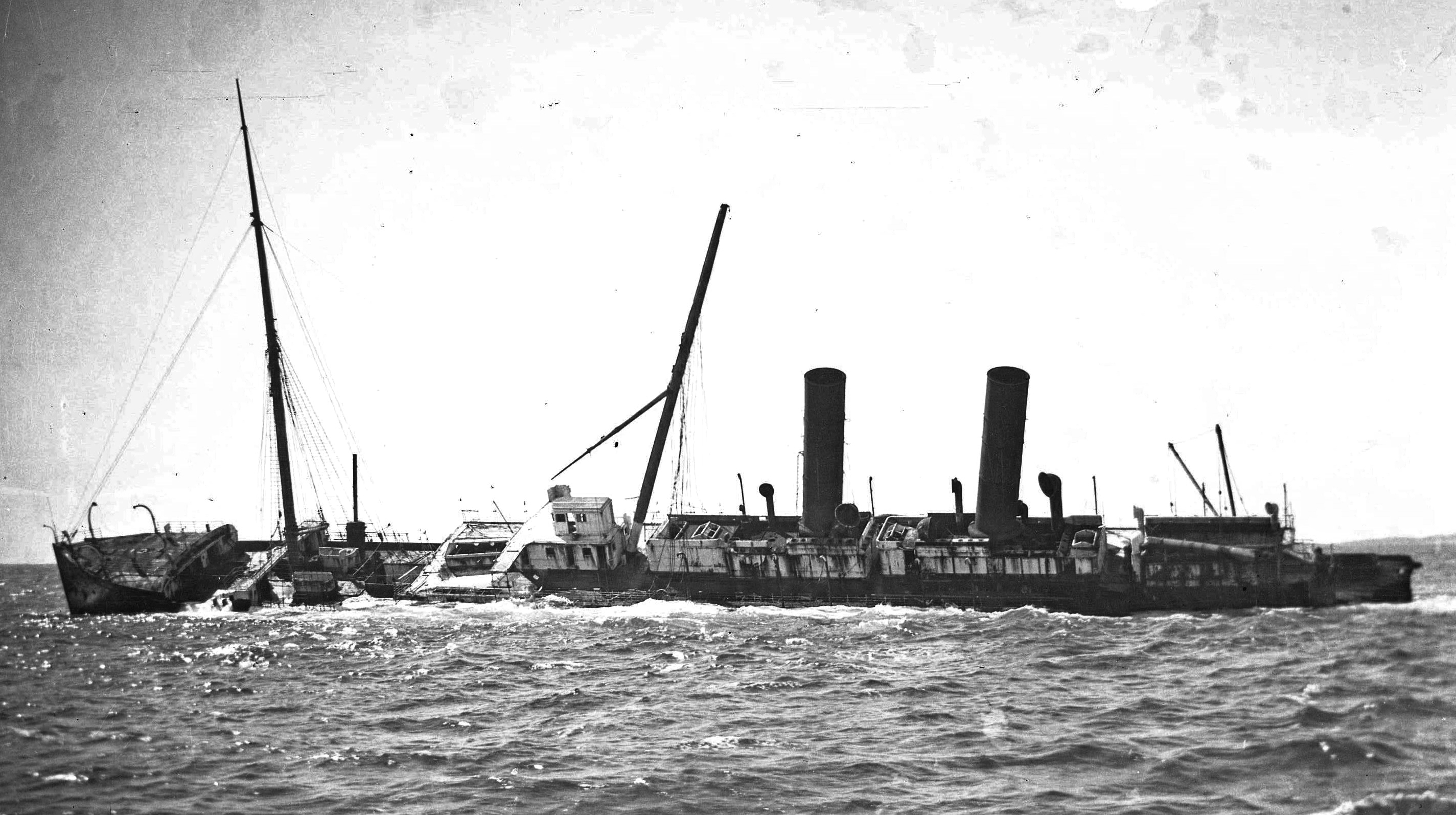
The wreck, c. 1910

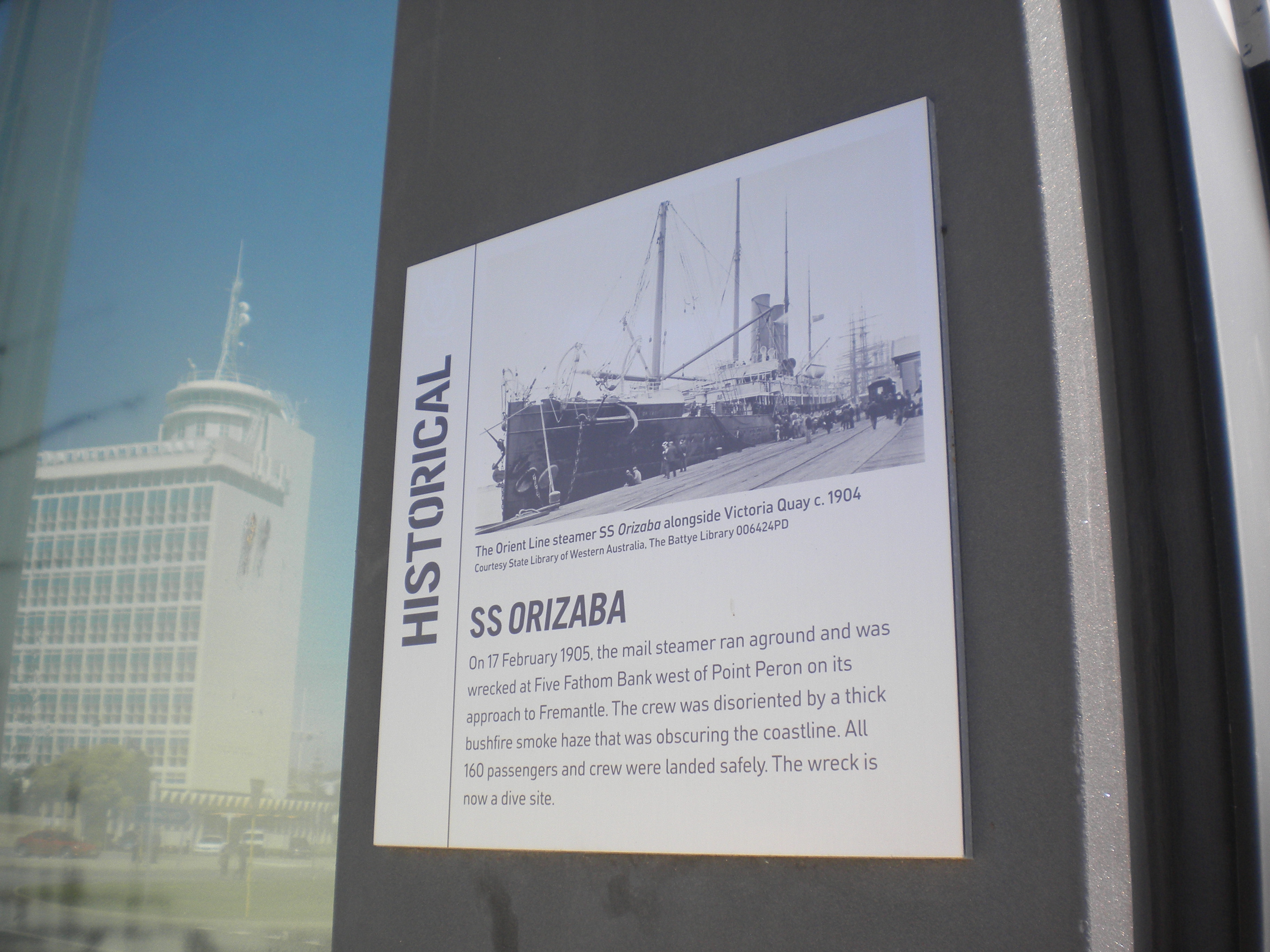
Fremantle Port information plaque
