= SS Peveril (1929) =

1929 cargo vessel

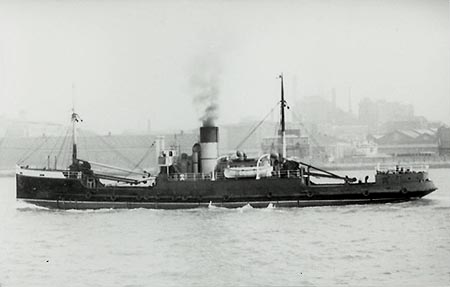
- Peveril making passage from Liverpool to Douglas.

History
- Name: Peveril
- Owner: 1929–1964: Isle of Man Steam Packet Company
- Operator: 1929–1964: Isle of Man Steam Packet Co.
- Port of registry: Douglas, Isle of Man
- Builder: Cammell Laird
- Cost: £42,600
- Launched: 25 April 1929
- Completed: 1929
- In service: 1929
- Out of service: 1964
- Identification: Official Number 145306; Code Letters M B X C
- Fate: 1964: Scrapped

General characteristics
- Type: Cargo Vessel
- Tonnage: 798 gross register tons (GRT)
- Length: 205 ft 0 in (62.5 m)
- Beam: 34 ft 6 in (10.5 m)
- Depth: 16 ft 0 in (4.9 m)
- Installed power: One triple-expansion directly coupled engine which produced 200 pounds p.s.i., 1,250 shp (930 kW)
- Speed: 12 knots (22 km/h)
- Capacity: 12 passengers.; Cargo capacity not recorded
- Crew: 17

SS (RMS) Peveril (II) was a steel, single-screw cargo vessel, built by Cammell Laird at Birkenhead in 1929, and operated by the Isle of Man Steam Packet Company until 1964.

== Dimensions ==
Peveril – the second ship in the company to be so named – was a steel, single-screw vessel, which had a registered tonnage of 798 GRT. Length 205 feet; beam 34 feet 6 inches; depth 16 feet. She was powered by one triple-expansion directly coupled engine which produced 200 p.s.i., developing 1,250 i.h.p. and gave her a speed of 12 knots. Peveril had accommodation for 12 passengers and a crew of 17.

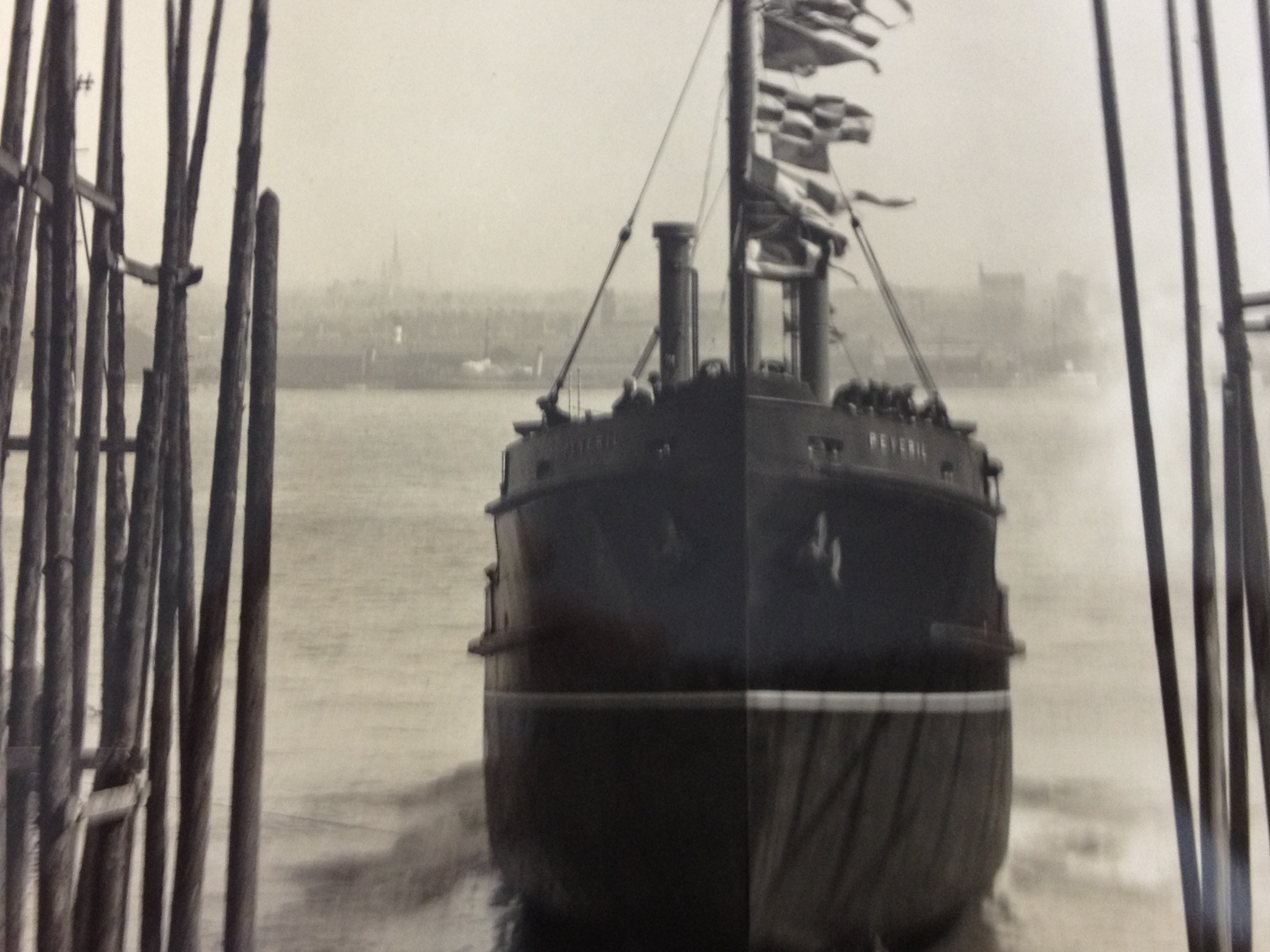
Peveril is launched at Birkenhead. 25 April 1929.

== Service life ==
Peveril was constructed at a cost of £42,600, and was the first cargo ship ordered directly by the Steam Packet, previous ones having been bought second hand. She was launched at Cammel Laird & Co. Ltd, Birkenhead on 25 April 1929 by Mrs. W.H. Kitto. The vessel traded mainly between Douglas, Ramsey and Liverpool.

The Isle of Man was affected by strong southeasterly gales during early March 1937, which in turn affected the Peveril's schedule. Having made passage from Liverpool to Douglas on Wednesday March 10, the Peveril was required to achor at the Double Corner, in the inner harbour of Douglas, on account of the heavy sea. She was unable to discharge her cargo on Thursday March 11, which in turn meant that the Peveril could not carry out her sailing programme as scheduled. She finally resumed her schedule when she left Douglas on Friday March 12.

On Monday 9 October 1961 Peveril's Master Capt. Alex Clucas was found dead on board the vessel whilst she was loading cargo in the Coburg Dock, Liverpool, having arrived from Douglas the previous day. Capt. Clucas was 56 years of age, and was found by a member of his crew lying in his cabin in an unconscious state. He was taken to hospital, but was pronounced dead on arrival. Capt. Clucas' brother, Capt. Robert Clucas, was at that time Master of the Manxman.

== Disposal ==
With the arrival of her successor, MV Peveril, she became redundant. She had her name changed to Peveril II in October 1963 for the last few months of her life, to release her original name for the new cargo vessel. Peveril II was sold to the Belton Shipping and Trading Company of London, and was broken up at Glasson Dock, Lancaster, in May 1964.

Peveril
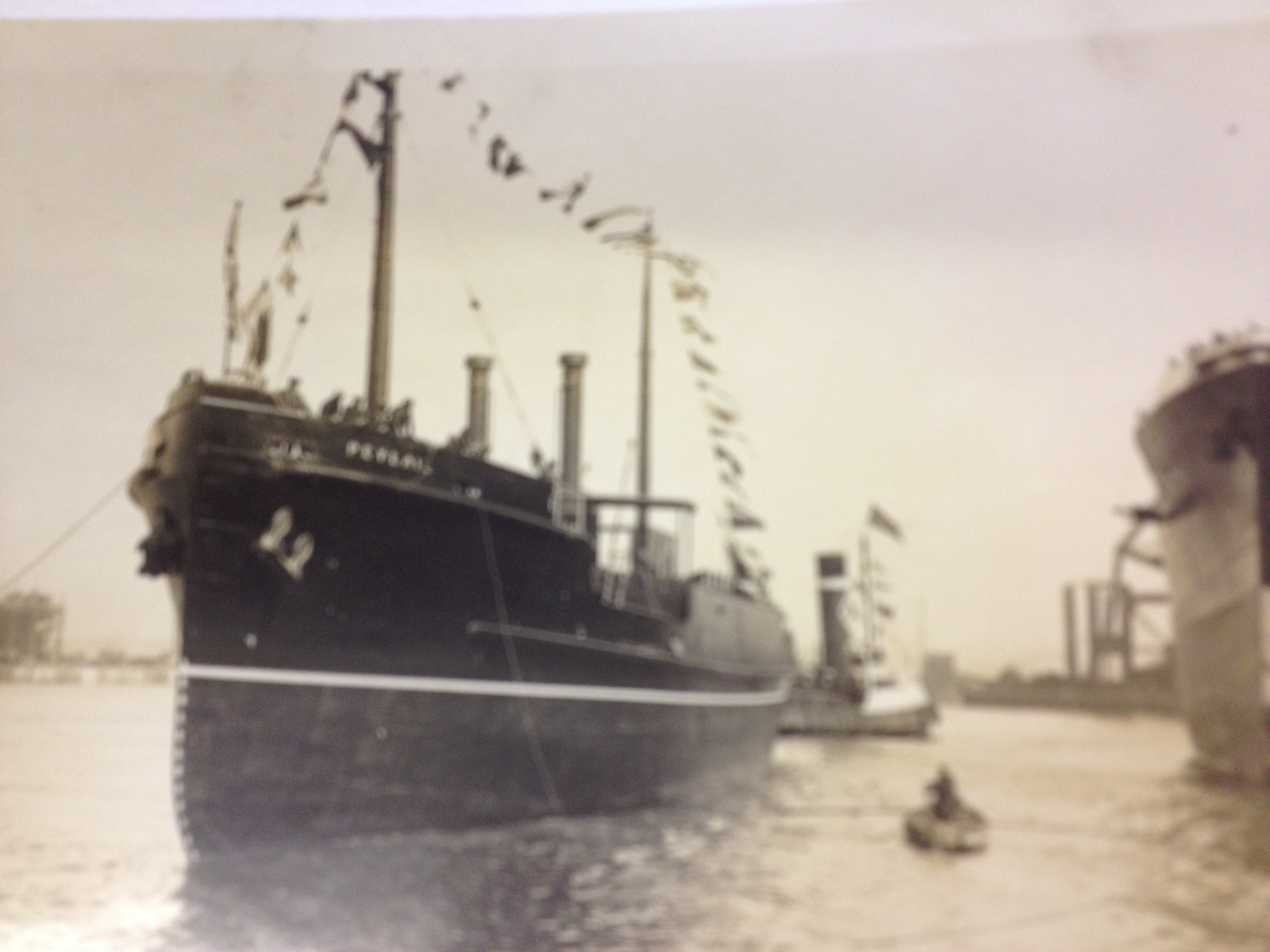
Peveril is positioned to the fitting out basin at Cammell Laird following her launch

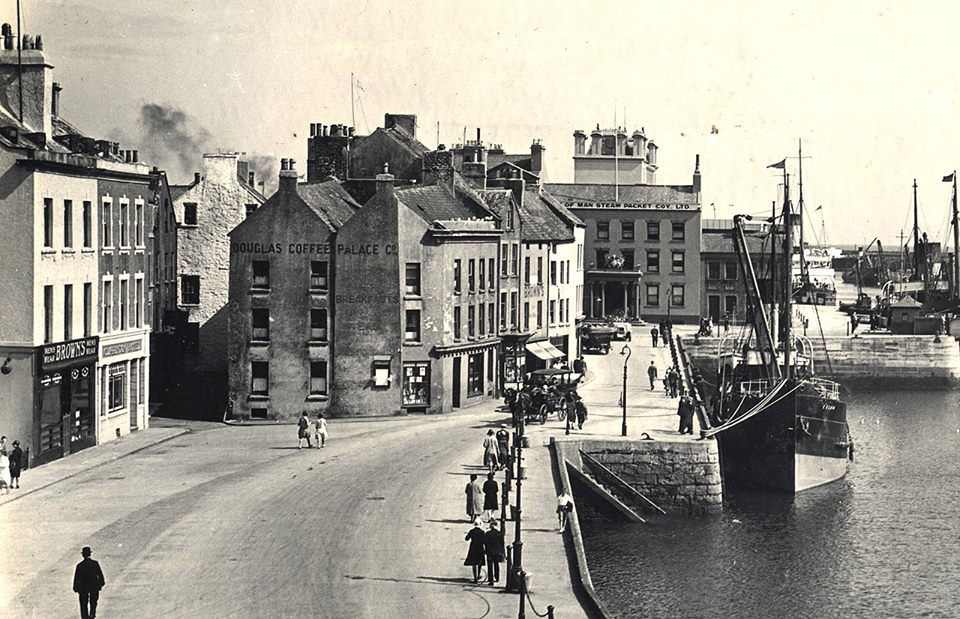
A scene at the inner harbour, Douglas. Connister can be seen in the foreground at the Coffee Palace Berth, with Peveril in the background at the Office Berth
