= SS Ben-my-Chree (1908) =

Passenger steamer

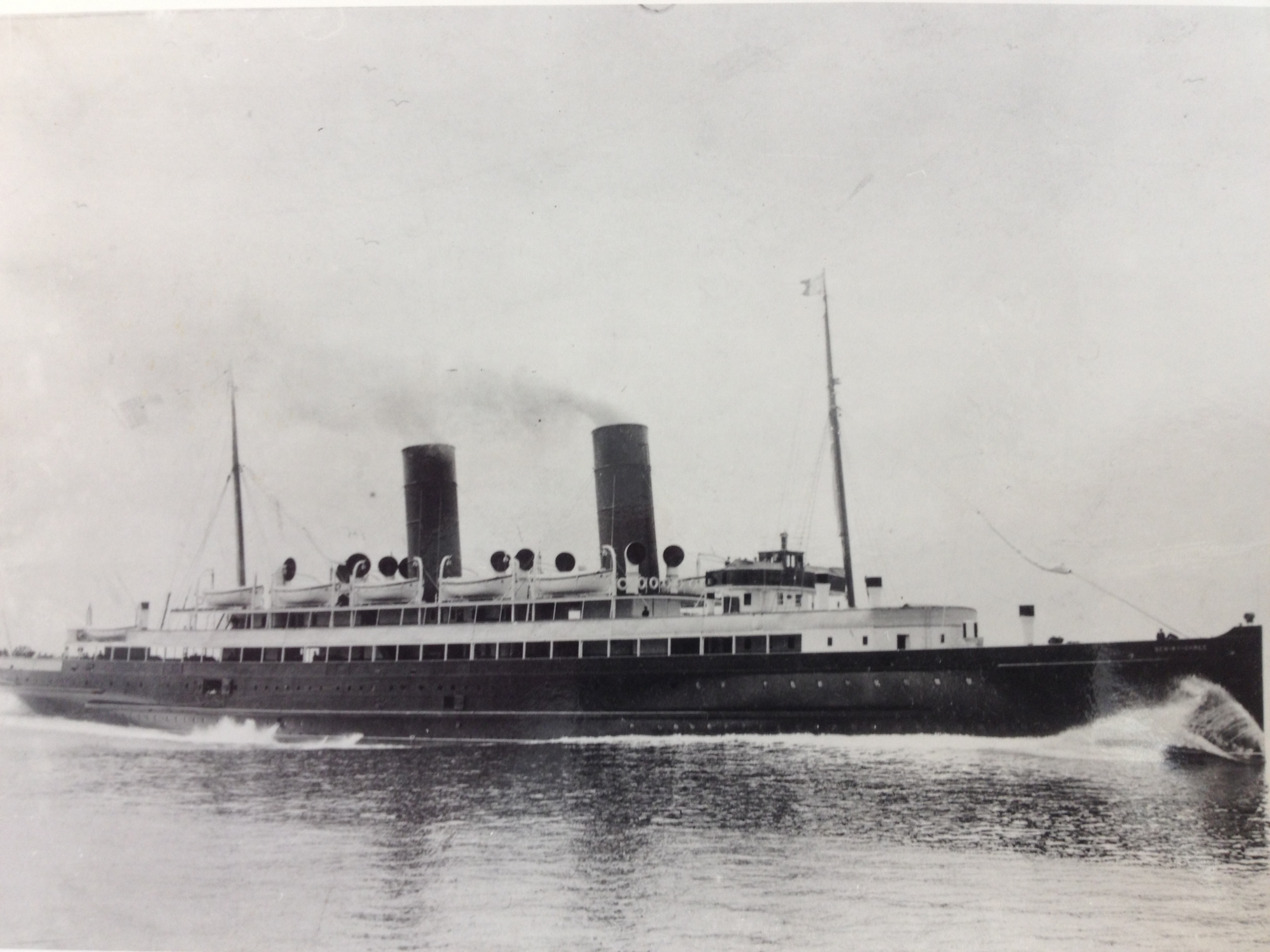
- RMS Ben-my-Chree

History

Isle of Man
- Name: Ben-my-Chree
- Namesake: Manx Gaelic term for Girl of my Heart
- Owner: 1908–1915: IOMSPCo. 1915-1917: Admiralty
- Operator: 1908–1915: IOMSPCo.
- Port of registry: Douglas, Isle of Man
- Route: Douglas - Liverpool
- Builder: Vickers Sons and Maxim
- Cost: £112,100
- Yard number: 363
- Laid down: 1908
- Launched: 23 March 1908
- Completed: July 1908
- Maiden voyage: 15 July 1908
- Out of service: 1915
- Reclassified: 1915 as HMS Ben-my-Chree
- Refit: 1915
- Home port: Douglas
- Identification: ON 118605; Code Letters H R C Q
- Nickname(s): The Ben
- Fate: Requisitioned 1915 by the Admiralty, converted by Cammell Laird's to Seaplane Carrier. Sunk by Turkish gunfire off Island Kastellorizo, January 1917. Wreck raised August 1920 and towed to Piraeus for scrap.
- Notes: Most powerful and fastest steamer to serve with the Isle of Man Steam Packet Company Fleet.

General characteristics
- Type: Passenger Steamer
- Tonnage: 2,651 gross register tons
- Length: 390 feet (120 m)
- Beam: 46 feet (14 m)
- Depth: 18 ft 6 in (5.6 m)
- Decks: 5
- Propulsion: 3 sets of Parson's single-reduction geared turbines, working at 170 pounds per square inch (1,200 kPa) in turn developing 14,000 shp (10,000 kW)
- Speed: 24.2 knots (27.8 mph) but reputed to have attained 26.9 knots (31.0 mph)
- Capacity: 2,700 passengers
- Crew: 116

TSS (RMS) Ben-my-Chree (III) No. 118605 – the third vessel in the company's history to be so named – was a passenger steamer operated by the Isle of Man Steam Packet Company between 1908 and 1915. Ben-my-Chree was requisitioned by the Admiralty in 1915 and converted to a seaplane carrier; commissioned as HMS Ben-my-Chree, she was sunk by Turkish batteries on 11 January 1917.

Ben-my-Chree was built in 1908 at the Vickers Sons and Maxim shipyard, Barrow in Furness. She was the fifth ship built in the Barrow yard for the Isle of Man Steam Packet, and was launched by Mrs. J. T. Cowell at 13:45hrs on Monday 23 March 1908.

Ben-my-Chree is regarded as amongst the finest and certainly the fastest of vessels ever to serve the line.

In appearance she was said to resemble a mini Cunarder rather than a conventional cross-channel steamer, proudly being described by the company as: "the fastest and most luxuriously appointed channel steamer afloat."

During the early part of the 20th century, speed of service was very much at the fore for shipping companies plying the Irish Sea routes to the Isle of Man; an article in the Daily Mail of July 1908 stated:

What the Lusitania is to the Atlantic the Isle of Man Steam Packet Company's new steamer Ben-my-Chree will probably be to the Irish Sea. There can, of course, be no comparison as to size between the leviathan Cunarders and the speedy little Manx boats, but for years there has been a quiet, determined contest between the vessels of the two Companies for sea-going speed honours. The diminutive boats plying from Liverpool to Douglas claimed pride of place until the advent of the Lusitania and Mauritania. Infected by the competitive spirit, the Directors of the Isle of Man Steam Packet Company resolved that their next vessel should not be far behind the race. The Ben-my-Chree, it is asserted, can reach over 25 knots and it is expected to reduce the record time (2hrs 56 mins) from Liverpool to Douglas, at present held by the turbine steamer Viking, by six minutes at least. Apart from the contest for speed honours there are many points of similarity between the Manx vessels and the new Cunard liners.

— The Daily Mail. Saturday 11 July 1908.

== Background ==
Ben-my-Chree resulted from the great success of the Viking, which was built three years earlier and employed on the Steam Packet's Douglas - Fleetwood schedule. The company quickly decided that a larger and more powerful turbine ship should be ordered for the Douglas–Liverpool service and in 1907 invited tenders for another fast turbine steamer in order to cement its place as the primary carrier to the Isle of Man. The requirements of the tender included:

Length : 375 feet (114 m) Breadth : 46 feet (14 m) Depth : 18 ft 6 in (5.6 m). In addition the vessel was to be able to undertake a continuous six hour passage at a speed of 24 knots (28 mph) and be capable of accommodating 2,500 passengers on a No.2 Board of Trade Certificate, conforming to a Lloyd's A1 Certificate.

The Ben, as she became affectionately known, was to be 40 feet (12 m) longer, 4 feet (1.2 m) broader and carry 550 more passengers than her older sister.

== Dimensions and layout ==
Ben-my-Chree was built under special survey from Lloyd's of London and also in accordance with the Board of Trade for their passenger certificates.Ben-my-Chree had a tonnage of 2,651 GRT; length 390 feet (375 feet between the perpendiculars); beam 46 feet; depth 18 feet 6 inches. Ben-my-Chree's overall length was 18 feet (5.5 m) longer than the later Lady of Mann and her engines developed 2,000 shp (1,500 kW) more than those of The Lady. This continued engine development resulted from ever-improving engineering and material standards, thereby in turn securing greater thermal efficiency.

Ben-my-Chree is launched at Barrow, 23 March 1908
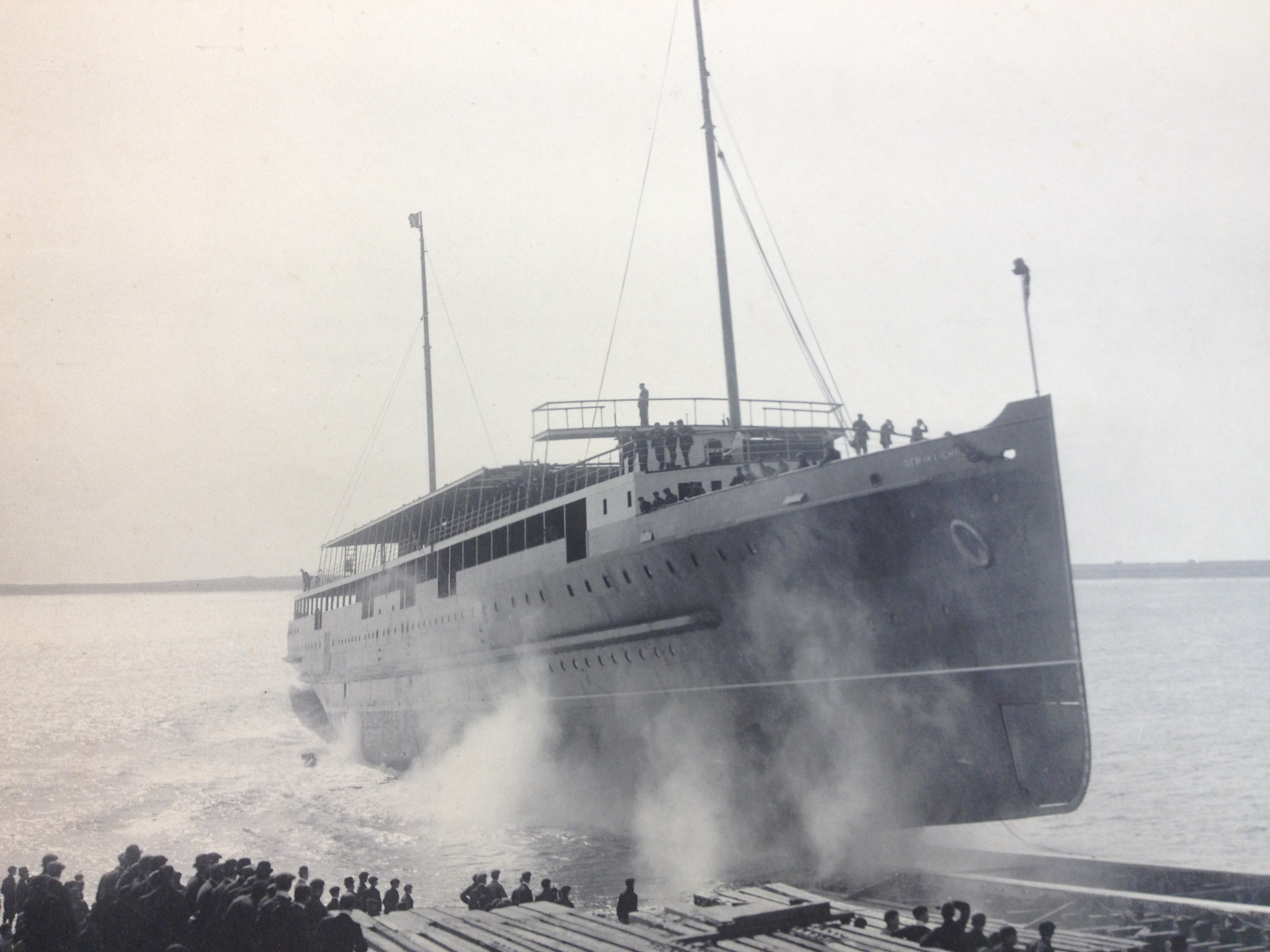
Ben-my-Chree descends the slipway

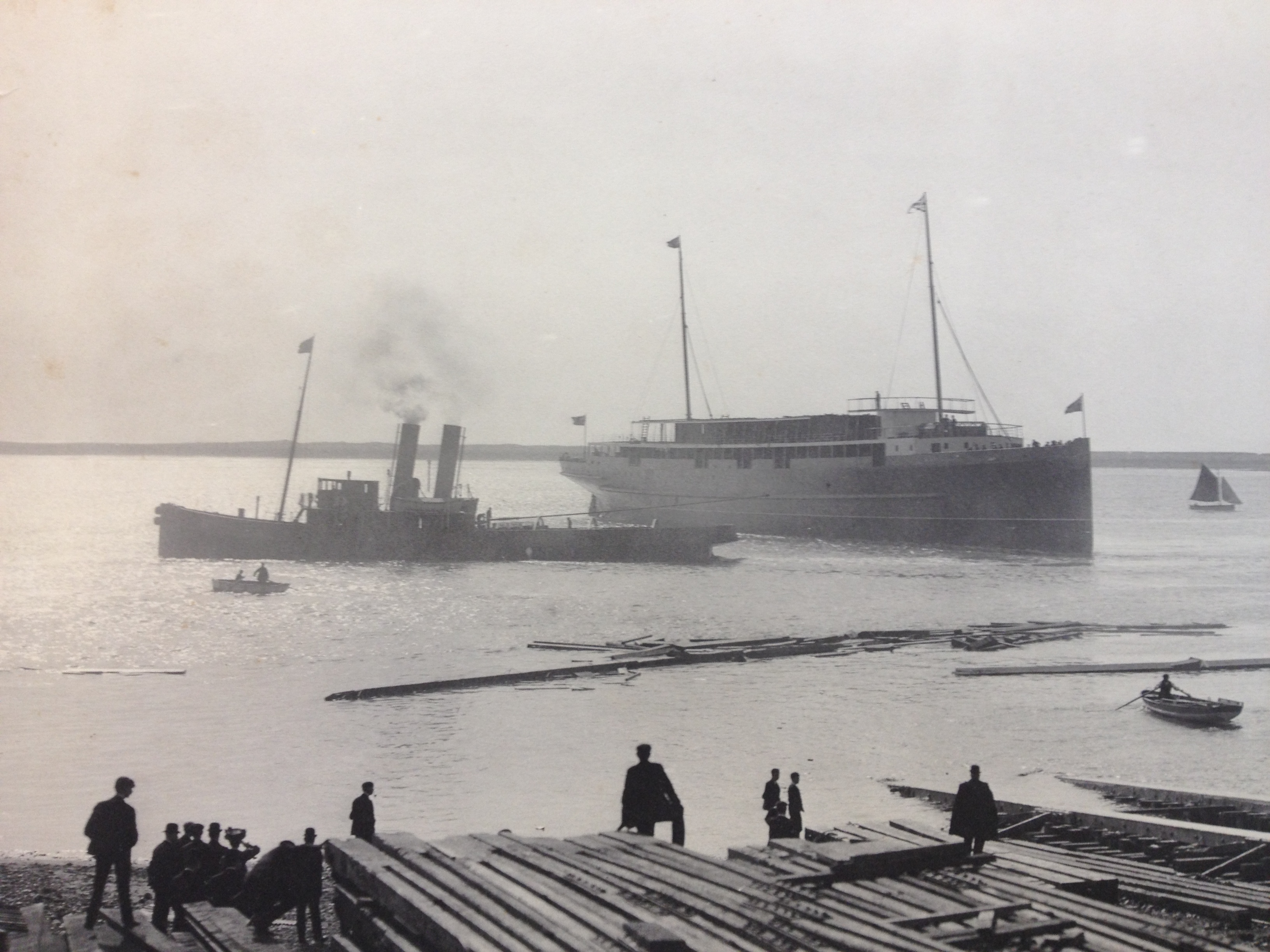
Ben-my-Chree being manoeuvred to the fitting-out basin

== Features ==
=== Power ===
Ben-my-Chree was driven by three Parsons steam turbines which were built under licence by Vickers Sons and Maxim, the turbines developing 14,000 shaft horsepower, thereby resulting in a designed service speed of 24.5 knots. The turbines were so arranged so as to work in series, with one high-pressure ahead turbine driving the centre shaft, and two low-pressure ahead turbines driving their respective wing shaft. Astern turbines were incorporated in the casing, with each low-pressure turbine fitted with valves to control the admission of steam for ahead and astern working. These manoeuvring valves were independent of the high-pressure turbine which would run idle when the ship was manoeuvring. The valve gear was arranged for easy operation and was placed at the forward end of the high-pressure turbine. The main valves were of the vertical equilibrium type operated by large handwheels.

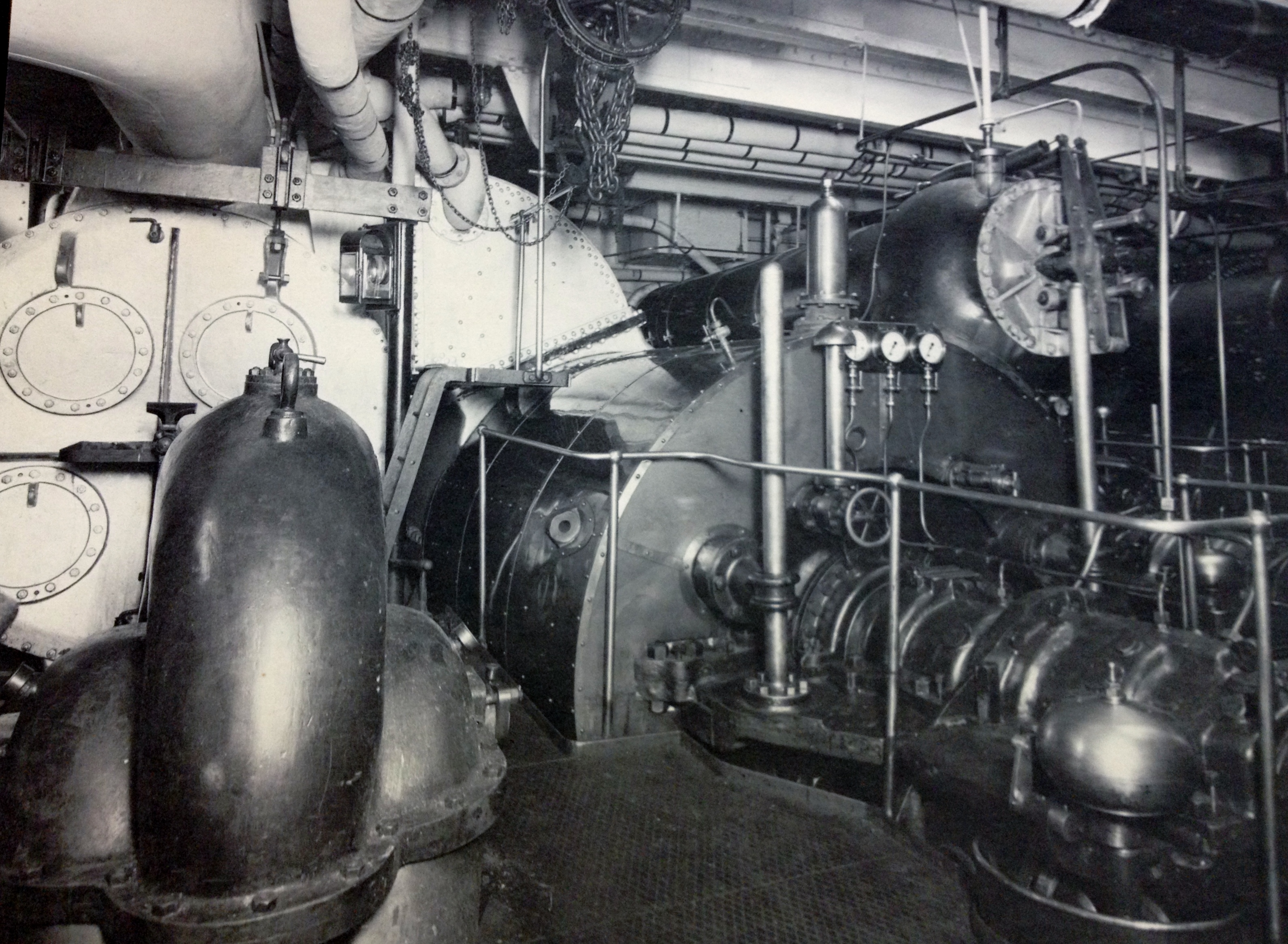
Engine room of Ben-my-Chree.

Two condensers were fitted, one on each side of the turbine run, and were supplied with circulating water by two large centrifugal pumps. The air pumps were direct acting twin-type pumps, fitted in duplicate for each condenser and independently driven. Steam was supplied at a pressure of 170 lb per square inch by four double-ended cylindrical boilers, arranged to work under forced draught with closed stokeholds. Each of the boilers was fitted with eight furnaces of the suspension type. There were four combustion chambers, each common to two furnaces, the shell plates and stays being manufactured from high-tensile steel. The boilers were arranged in two boiler rooms with separate uptakes and funnel for each room. They were equipped with four steam-driven fans fitted for supplying air under pressure to the boilers. The boilers were 16 ft 9 in (5.1 m) long with a diameter of 20 ft 7.5 in (6.3 m). The working pressure was 170 pounds per square inch (1,200 kPa).

In addition to the usual feed and bilge pumping engines, the machinery department was fitted with oil lubricating pumps which serviced the turbine bearings, sanitary pumps, water heater, ash hoist and fresh water pumps.

=== Technology ===
==== Watertight compartments ====
The ship was subdivided into an eleven watertight compartments, so proportioned that the ship would float if any two adjacent compartments became flooded. The watertight doors throughout the ship were operated on the Stone-Lloyd system that enabled all doors to be closed instantly and simultaneously from the bridge.

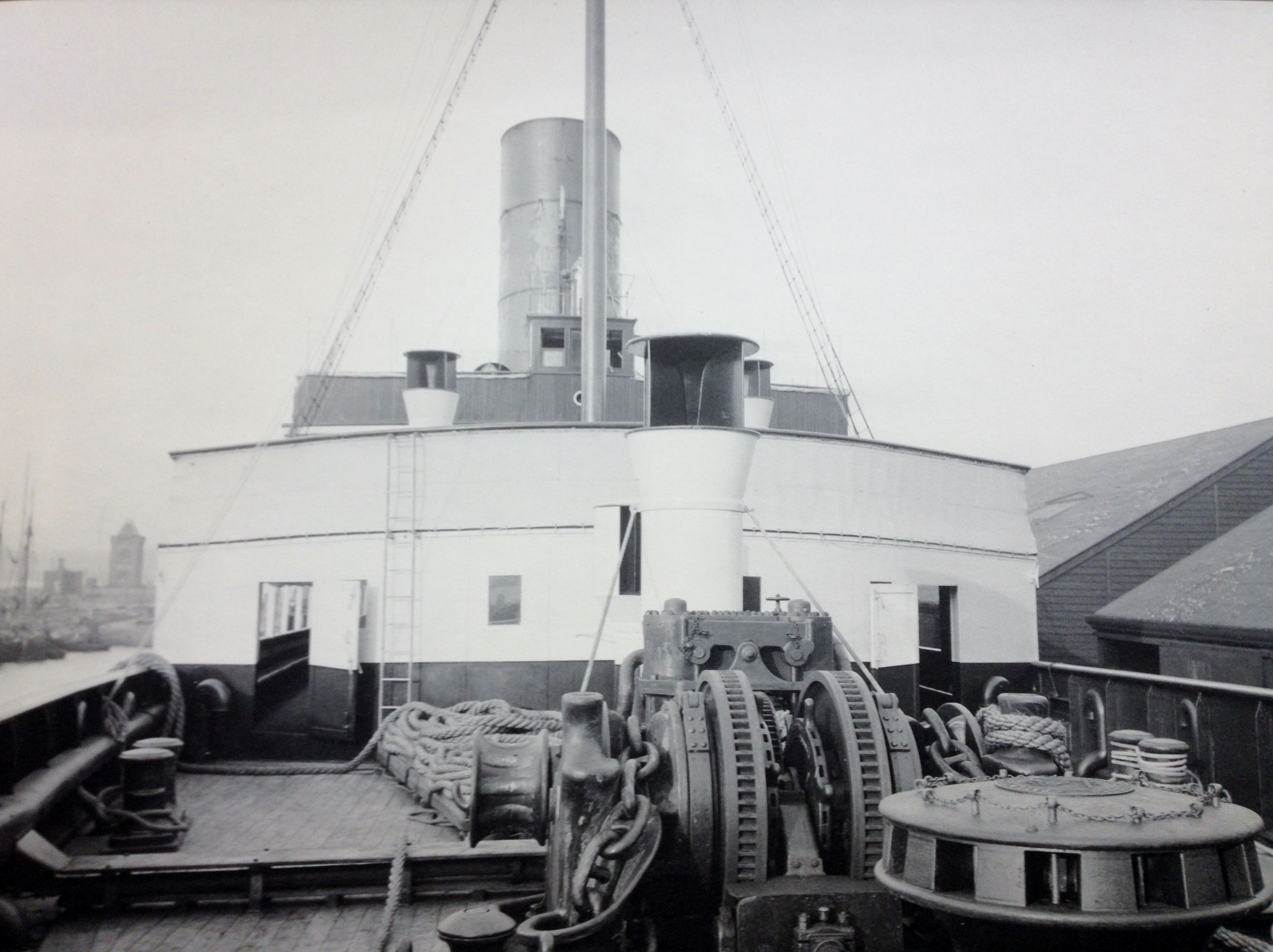
View of the winding gear on board Ben-my-Chree.

==== Lighting ====
The Ben-my-Chree had a complete installation of electric lighting. The twin generating plants were duplicate, each being able to supply every one of the 350 fittings which were of 16 candela. A searchlight was situated at the bow and a system of electric bells was also fitted.

=== Lifeboats ===
Ben-my-Chree was fitted with a total of 12 lifeboats, ten of which were of a large capacity, and each boat was fitted with a patent disengaging gear. She was certified for a crew complement of 116, and had a passenger capacity of 2,700.

=== Other features ===
A powerful steam windlass was situated forward on the shelter deck for working the anchors, which were arranged to be stowed in hawse pipes, and two large capstans were fitted aft on the shelter deck for warping purposes. A combined steam and hand steering engine was also located aft, and this was controlled by a telemotor gear from the navigating bridge. There was also a powerful steering gear situated forward, the purpose of which was to operate a bow rudder so as to facilitate the quick turning and manoeuvring of the vessel when entering or leaving port. For the stern rudder there was a combined steam and hand gear.

Water ballast tanks were fitted to each end of the vessel which enabled her to be trimmed to any desired draught. There were also large water ballast tanks in the holds in order for trimming the vessel in rough weather.

=== Sea trials ===
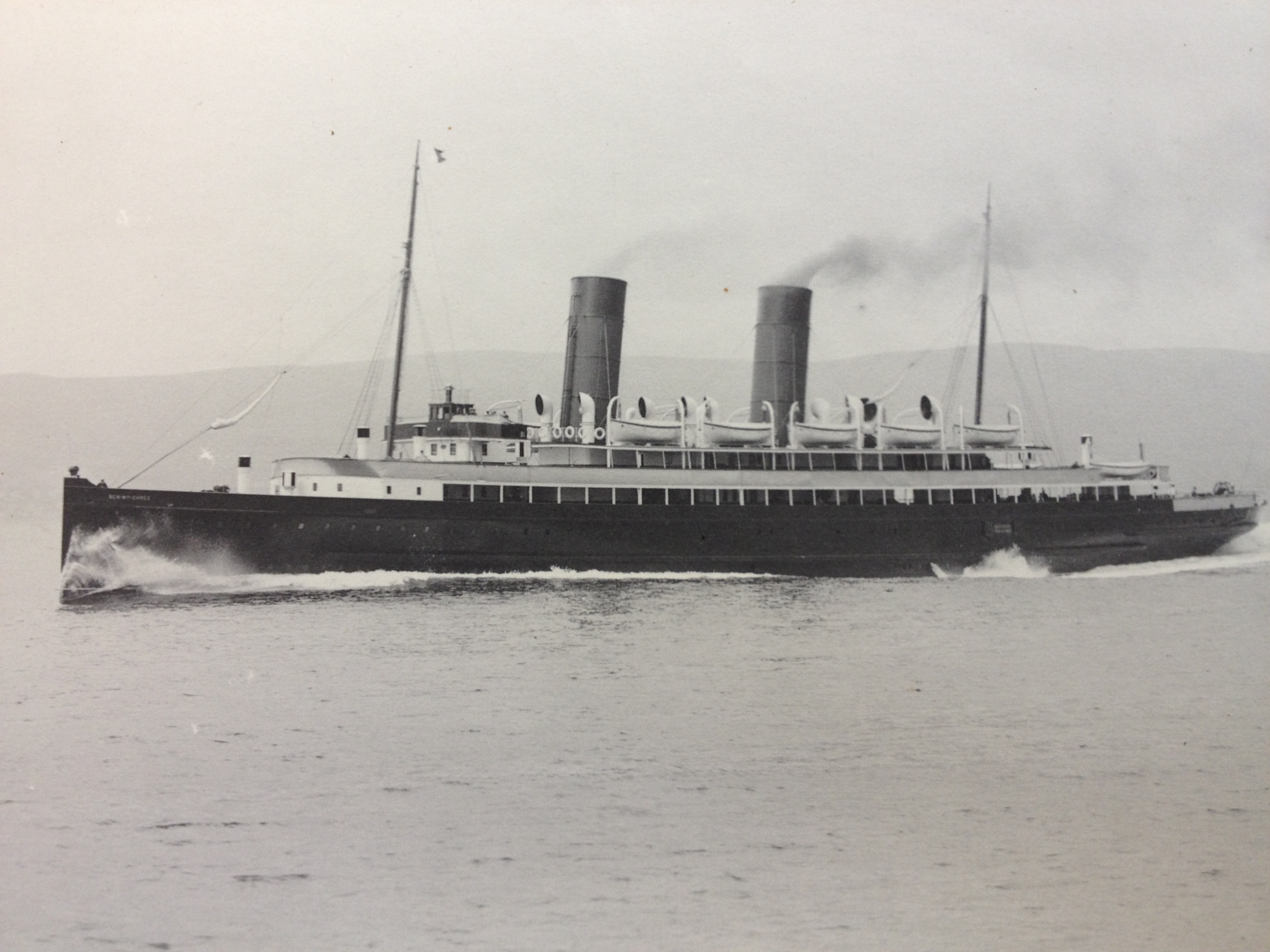
Ben-my-Chree pictured during her sea trials, Friday 10 July 1908.

Ben-my-Chree underwent her speed trial on the River Clyde on Wednesday 8 and Friday 10 July 1908, having departed Barrow-in-Furness on Monday 6 July. A large party of Steam Packet Company directors had travelled to Ardrossan on board the Tynwald and joined the Ben-my-Chree at Greenock. Slipping her moorings, the Ben-my-Chree made her way down the Clyde to a point a few miles above the Cumbrae Lighthouse, gathering full speed as she went. The speed trial was to take place between Cumbrae Lighthouse on a fixed run to Skull Martin Lightship, situated just below Copeland Island at the mouth of Belfast Lough and back to Cumbrae Lighthouse.

The distance between the two points was 73 nautical miles, roughly equidistant to that between Liverpool and Douglas. The weather during the Wednesday run was far from suitable, with a strong easterly wind, rain and poor visibility. Ben-my-Chree crossed the mark in excess of 24 knots (28 mph), employing lookouts on various vantage points on board, she kept her speed for a period of approximately 3 hours. By this time the fog horn on the Skull Martin Lightship could be clearly heard, but with visibility reported to be down to less than a mile, it was proving impossible to make the required visual reference to calibrate the speed. The prevailing conditions coupled to the high density of shipping traffic in the area forced an abandonment of the trial. Speed was reduced to 18 knots (21 mph), the Ben-my-Chree was swung about, and made passage back to Greenock. The inclement weather lasted into the following day, leading to the rest of the trials to be held on Friday.

== Appearance ==
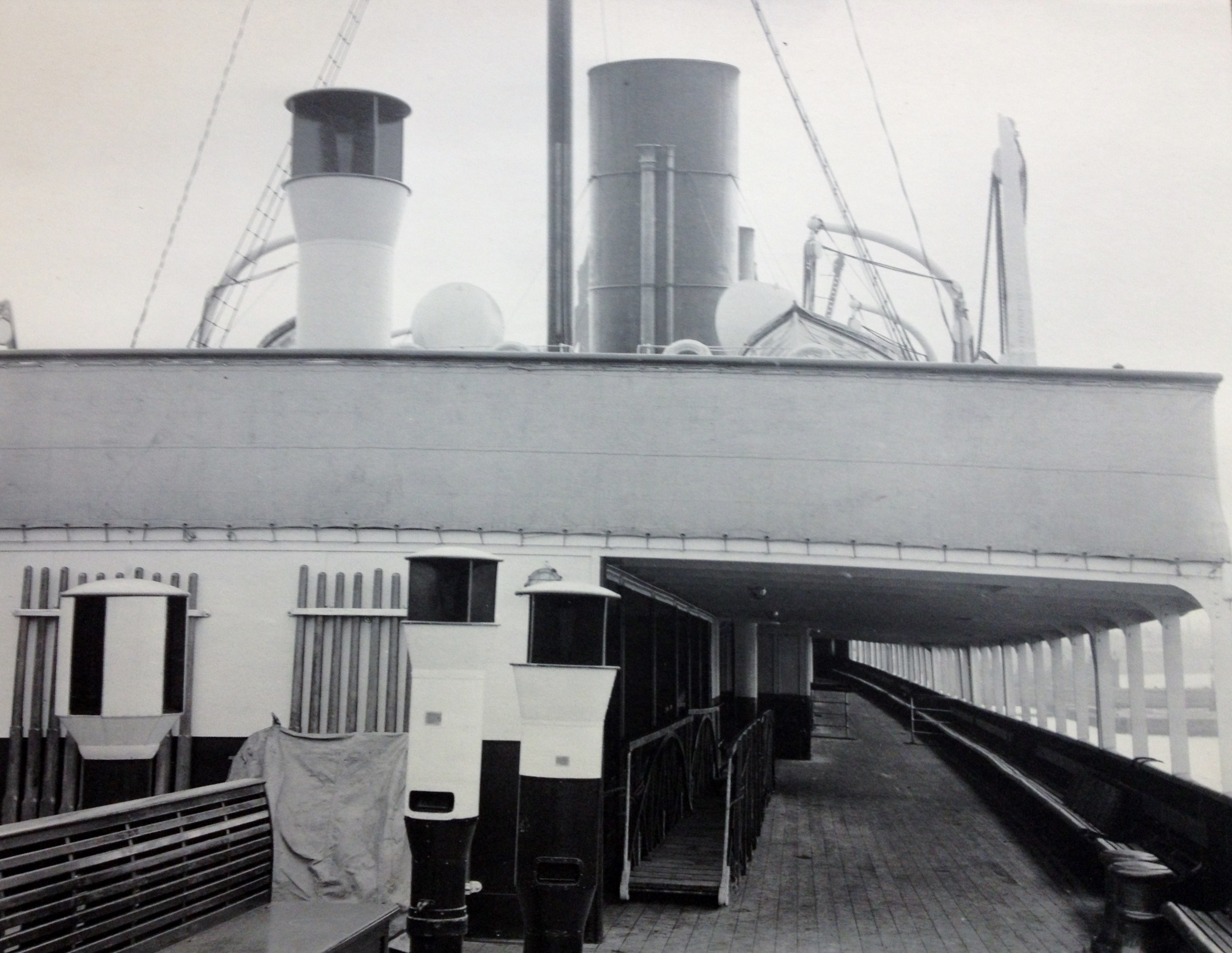
View of the spacious promenade deck on board Ben-my-Chree.

Ben-my-Chree's design was very much suited to the Edwardian era. Her five decks consisted of lower, main, shelter, promenade and boat decks, and offered ample room for her passengers. The promenade deck extended over two-thirds of the vessel's length. Above the promenade deck was the boat deck, extending over half of her length and affording ample shelter to passengers during inclement weather. The shelter deck was carried right fore and aft, and on each side there was a fine promenade. The centre of this deck consisted of cabins and public rooms while on the two decks below (the main and lower) there were additional public saloons. The first class passengers occupied the forward part of the ship and the second class the after part. There was a wide companionway forward allowing access to all decks via stairways.

Situated on the promenade deck was a tea room which was paneled in grey sycamore and mahogany. Below this there was the Lady's Saloon, which was finished in satin wood and walnut. The smoke room with adjacent bar was situated in the after part of the deck-house on the shelter deck. On the main deck there was the main saloon, which was 80 feet (24 m) long and 46 feet (14 m) wide. It was lit by large patent rectangular windows which were paneled with mahogany with carved pilasters. The first class dining saloon was situated on the lower deck with accommodation for 120 passengers. It also had a handsome appearance, being paneled in mahogany and oak. At the aft end of the dining saloon there was a large pantry fitted up with Bain Maries, carving tables and linked by lifts to the main galley, which was situated above. At the fore end of the dining saloon on the lower deck there was a saloon for first class passengers.

The Ben-my-Chree was also fitted with 8 private cabins. These were located on the shelter deck and were exceptionally well furnished, fitted with sofas, a table and a folding lavatory.

In the second class section there was a large saloon on the main deck and a dining saloon on the lower deck, forward of which was the second class ladies saloon. A large buffet and bar was also provided for the second class passengers.

Fitted with two funnels and two masts which were schooner rigged a fine sheer and smart rake, the vessel was said to look as if she was at speed, even when at anchor.

Interior of RMS Ben-my-Chree
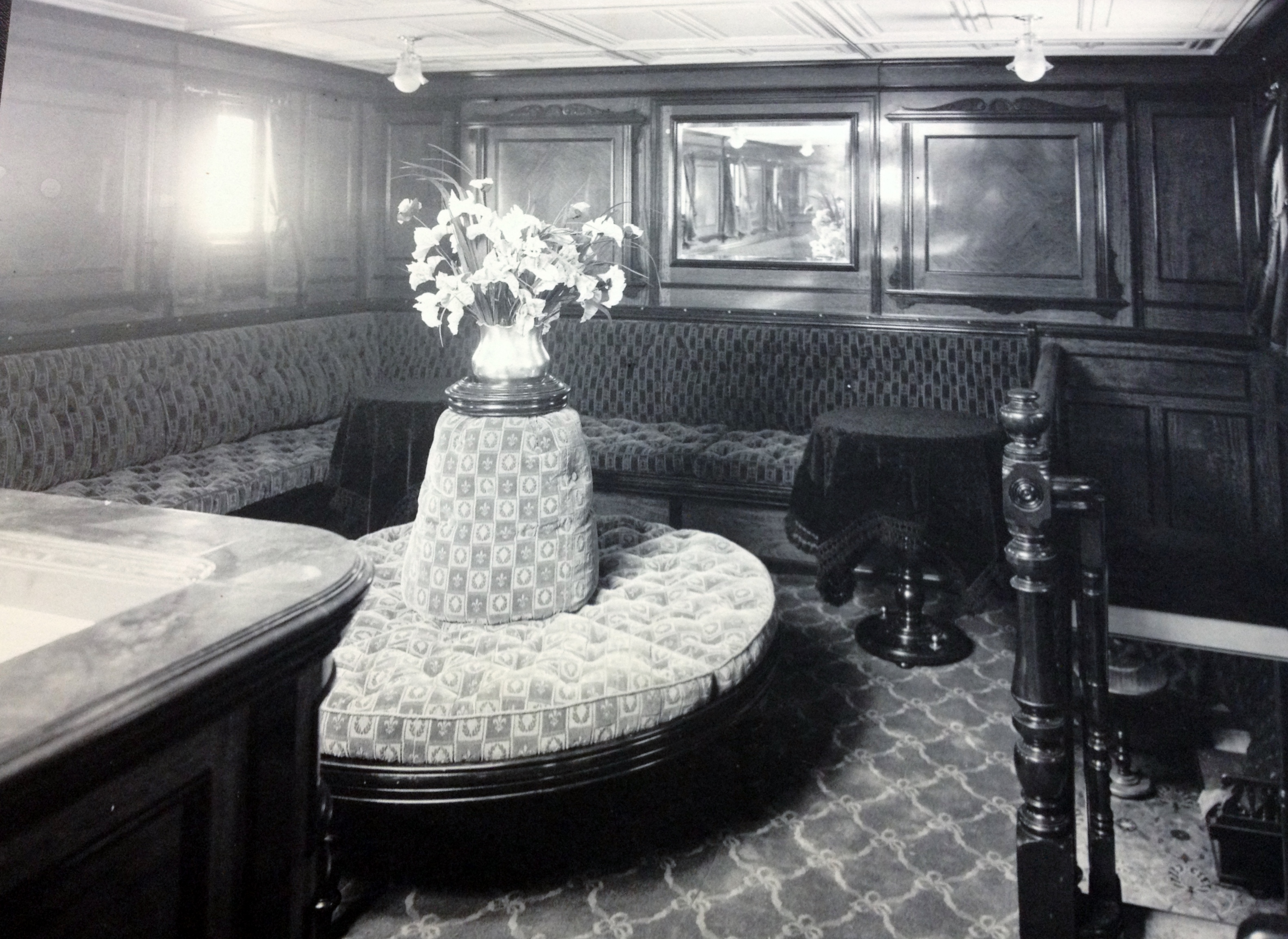
View of saloon on Ben-my-Chree

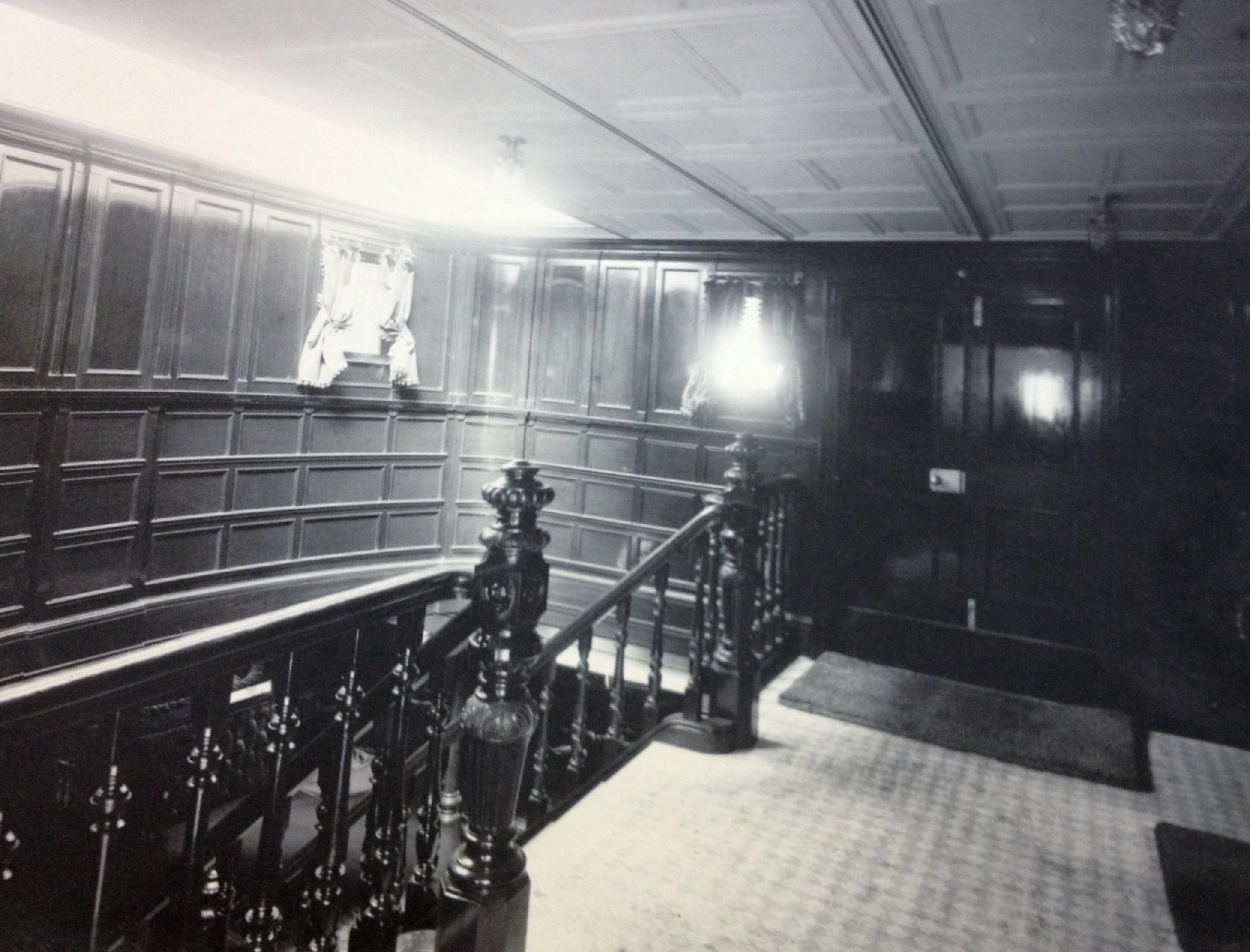
First Class stairway leading to saloon

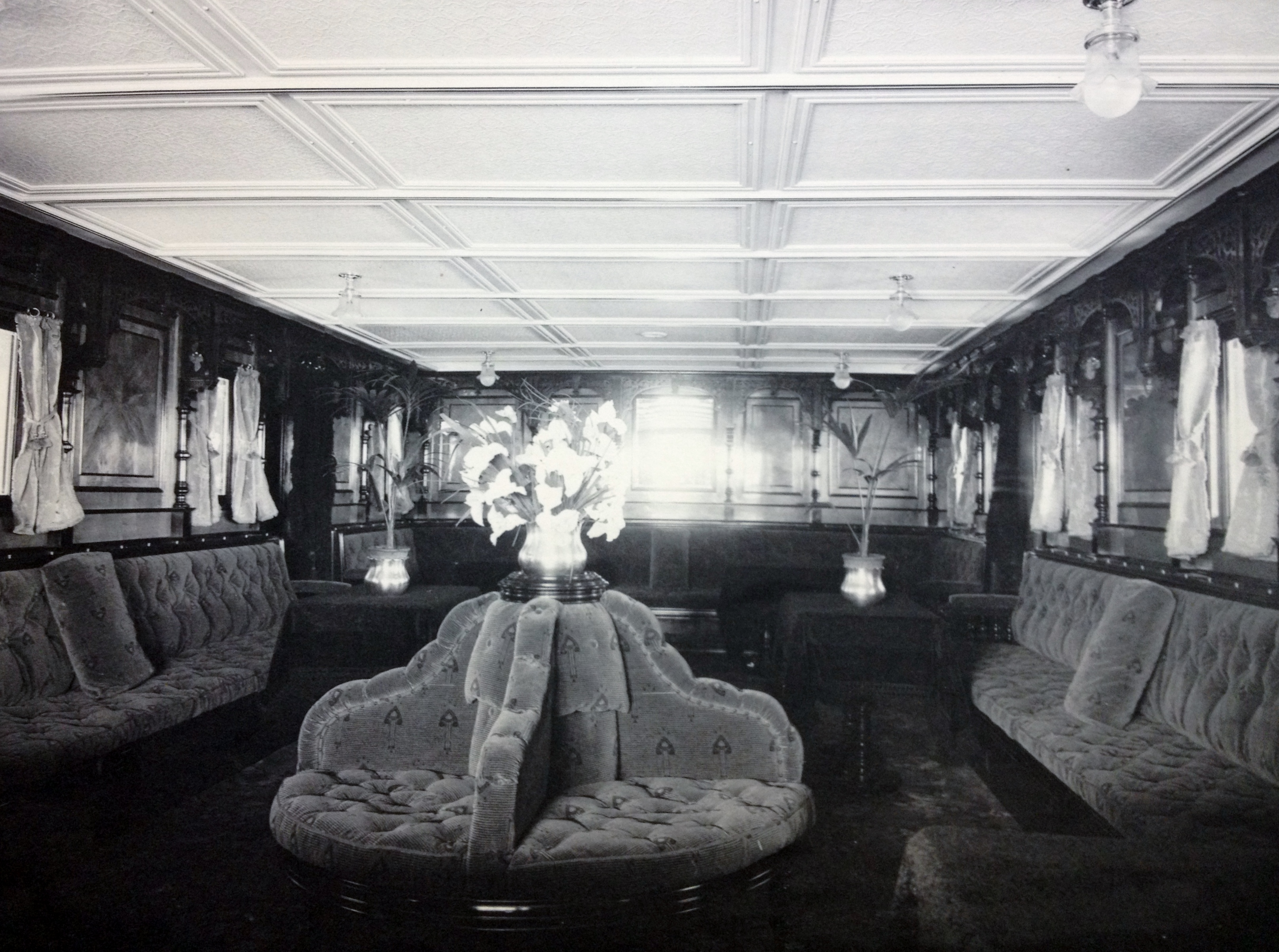
Ladies Saloon

== Service life ==
Ben-my-Chree had been scheduled to enter service in June 1908. However, industrial action which resulted in a "lockout" of employees at Vickers delayed her entry into service. She entered the graving dock at Barrow on 28 May, in order to have her propellers fitted and for her turbines to undergo testing. As a consequence of the strike, certain parts of her woodwork had also to be completed and her entry into service was therefore delayed until July. Because of this delay, the Empress Queen had to be taken back into commission earlier than planned.

=== Maiden voyage ===
Under the command of commodore of the Isle of Man Steam Packet Company, Captain Thomas Keig, the Ben-my-Chree made her maiden voyage from Liverpool to Douglas on Wednesday 15 July 1908. Many people had travelled from the Isle of Man the previous day, with a special service being run by the Fenella so as they could travel back to the Island on the inaugural voyage. Her departure was signaled by the firing of a gun on the Pier Head at 10:30, but Ben-my-Chree departed the Pier Head at 10:33, having been delayed by three minutes because of late passengers. At 10:45 she passed the Fort Perch Lighthouse and entered the Victoria Channel, by which time she was making 20 knots (23 mph). Passing the Crosby Lightship at 11:00 and the Formby Lightship at 11:09, Capt. Keig was forced to reduce speed owing to the presence of two dredgers in the channel. Ben-my-Chree exited the Victoria Channel, passing the Mersey Bar at 11:20 and set a course to Douglas. Full speed was attained, and resulted in Capt. Keig's hat being blown from his head and over the side of the vessel. The Ben-my-Chree was running against the tide (whereas the Viking had set the record with the tide in her favour). Coupled to this, The Ben was also having to contend with a headwind, blowing from the west. At 13:34 Ben-my-Chree arrived off Douglas Head and slowed for the last quarter of a mile as she approached her moorings at the Victoria Pier.

Over the course of the maiden voyage, four records were established:

- Liverpool (Pier Head) to Douglas (Douglas Head) – 3 hours 1 minute
- Liverpool (Victoria Tower) to Douglas (Douglas Head) – 2 hours 59 minutes
- New Brighton (Fort Perch Rock Lighthouse) to Douglas (Douglas Head) – 2 hours 49 minutes
- Mersey Bar to Douglas (Douglas Head) – 2 hours 14 minutes

Ben-my-Chree's exceptional service speed caused several stories to circulate about her. She is widely said to have achieved 26.9 knots (31.0 mph) during her sea trials over the measured mile, but in regular service her speed would be more in the region of 24.2 knots (27.8 mph). It is improbable that the vessel approached 27 knots except in the most unusual conditions, and it is only known that she once achieved 26.64 knots (30.66 mph) on a favourable tide. Going astern, she could travel at 16.6 knots (19.1 mph).

In her first season between Liverpool and Douglas, her average time between the Bar Lightship and the Head was 2 hours 24 minutes. A year later she reduced this average by one minute. However, her sustained high speeds came at a considerable cost. She used 95 tons of coal in one day's steaming, and these high running costs resulted in her appearing on station only during the peak periods of the summer months; during the rest of the time she was invariably laid up.

=== Mail and cargo ===
Ben-my-Chree was designed primarily for the carriage of passengers, but she could also accommodate a quantity of cargo. Her designation as a Royal Mail Ship (RMS) indicated that she carried mail under contract with the Royal Mail. A specified area was allocated for the storage of letters, parcels and specie (bullion, coins and other valuables).

== War service and loss ==
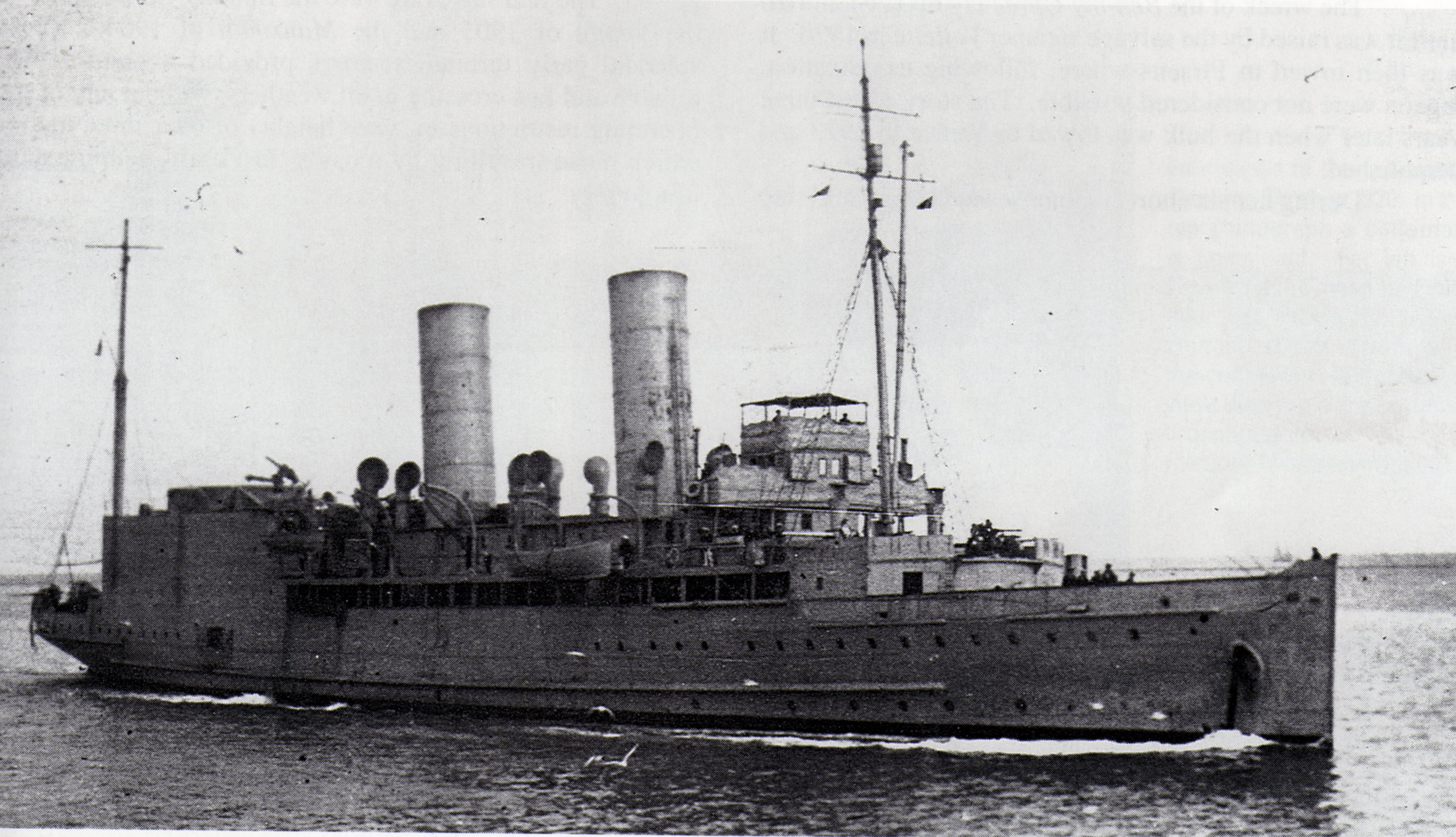
HMS Ben-my-Chree

Ben-my-Chree was the flagship of the Steam Packet Fleet when the Great War broke out in the summer of 1914, carrying more passengers than any other company ship.

She was requisitioned in January 1915, and went to Cammell Laird's where she was to be converted to a seaplane carrier in the Birkenhead yards. A major factor in her being chosen for such a conversion was her speed, as such ships had to be able to hold station when within the Grand Fleet.

The Ben-my-Chree was fitted with a large aircraft hangar aft and a smaller one forward, with a flying-off platform also fitted to the forward end of the ship. Cranes were fitted for hoisting the seaplanes back on board, and a workshop for the repair and servicing of the aircraft was fitted in the deck below the main hangar. Commissioned on 3 March 1915, her first base was Harwich, where she arrived on 28 April. HMS Ben-my-Chree was fitted with four 12-pounder and four anti-aircraft guns and carried four Short Type 184 seaplanes. When The Ben was fitted up as a carrier, it was assumed that the Short 184s could get airborne using the tilted forward trackway. In practice their weight was against them, so that they then had to be lowered into the sea, which meant that the ship would have to be almost stationary – a serious problem whilst in action. During 1915, when she was first in action, The Ben also carried Sopwith Schneider floatplane fighters which were tasked with intercepting Zeppelins over the North Sea. The Sopwith Schneiders also proved difficult to get airborne from the flying off platform, so to overcome this two-wheeled dollies were fitted beneath the floats.

By August 1915 HMS Ben-my-Chree had made her way to the Mediterranean reaching Malta on 7 June. From then she started her support of the Gallipoli Campaign by using her aircraft to spot for naval gunners as they bombarded the Turkish positions. On 12 August 1915 one of HMS Ben-my-Chree's 184s attacked and sunk a Turkish supply ship. The aircraft was piloted by Flt. Commander Charles Edmonds R.N.A.S. using a 14-inch Whitehead torpedo. It was the first successful attack against a ship with a torpedo dropped from the air. Five days after this sinking, two more torpedo attacks were launched from HMS Ben-my-Chree against Turkish supply ships. Flt. Commander Edmonds was involved in one attack, the other involving Flt. Lieutenant G.B. Dacre.

On 2 September 1915 HMS Ben-my-Chree went to the aid of the troopship Southland, which was sinking. She was successful in rescuing 815 men comprising 694 Australians and New Zealanders and 121 crew.

HMS Ben-my-Chree continued service in the Mediterranean into 1916, staging air raids into Bulgaria and spotting for naval gunners. Among her officers at this time was William Wedgwood Benn. At the end of 1916 she went through the Suez Canal and into the Red Sea, where she bombarded Arab camps and bombed railways. She then returned into the Mediterranean, resuming her duties as previous. On 11 January 1917 HMS Ben-my-Chree was anchored off Kastellorizo when a Turkish battery opened up on her, demolishing the aft hangar and holing the petrol store, setting light to the ship. A further shell set fire to the hangar, which was followed by further hits. The steering gear had been disabled by one shot and so it was impossible for the ship to move out of range of the battery. Approximately 30 minutes after the commencement of the bombardment the order was given to abandon ship. Two of the ship's three motorboats had been disabled, but one had escaped damage and, using the side of the ship, was able to evacuate the 250 crew members who were on board, with Commander Samson and his chief engineer being the last to leave the stricken vessel. HMS Ben-my-Chree sank in the shallow water after further bombardment.

Five crew members, including Commander Samson, returned later that day. They removed the breech-blocks from the guns and rescued the ship's mascots.

== Disposal ==
In 1920 the wreck of HMS Ben-my-Chree was raised and taken to Piraeus. Subsequently, she was sold to the Crete Shipping Company and broken up in Italy in 1923.

== Official number and code letters ==
Official numbers are issued by individual flag states. They should not be confused with IMO ship identification numbers. Ben-my-Chree had the UK Official Number 118605 and originally used the Code Letters H R C Q.
