= SS Tyrconnel (1892) =

Coastal cargo vessel

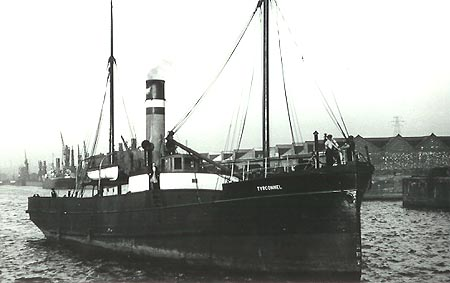
- Tyrconnel

History
- Name: Tyrconnel
- Owner: 1892–1902: W. Hammond & J. Herdman, Glasgow; 1902–11: Manx Steam Trading Company; 1911–32: Isle of Man Steam Packet Company
- Operator: 1892–1902: Not Recorded.; 1902–11: Manx Steam Trading Company.; 1911–32: Isle of Man Steam Packet Co.
- Port of registry: Castletown, Isle of Man
- Builder: J. Fullerton, Paisley.
- Cost: Purchased by the Isle of Man Steam Packet Company in 1911 for £4,875
- Launched: 29 February 1892
- Completed: 1892
- In service: 1892. In service with the Isle of Man Steam Packet Company 1911.
- Out of service: 1932
- Identification: ON 99794; Code Letters N D P B
- Fate: Sold to S.W. Coe & Co, 1932. Scrapped at Danzig, Poland, 1934.
- Notes: The first purely cargo vessel in the Company's fleet.

General characteristics
- Type: Coastal Cargo Vessel.
- Tonnage: 274 gross register tons (GRT)
- Length: 130 feet (40 m)
- Beam: 22 feet (6.7 m)
- Depth: 10 ft 2 in (3.1 m)
- Installed power: 450 shp (340 kW)
- Speed: 9 knots (17 km/h)

SS Tyrconnel, was a coastal cargo vessel which was purchased by the Isle of Man Steam Packet Company, in 1911.

== Construction and dimensions ==
Tyrconnel was a single-screw steel steamship, and was built by J. Fullerton of Paisley in 1892. J. Fullerton also supplied her engines and boilers. Tyrconnel had a registered tonnage of 274 tons; length 130'; beam 22'; depth 10'2". She was powered by a two-cylinder compound engine, which gave her a speed of 9 knots.

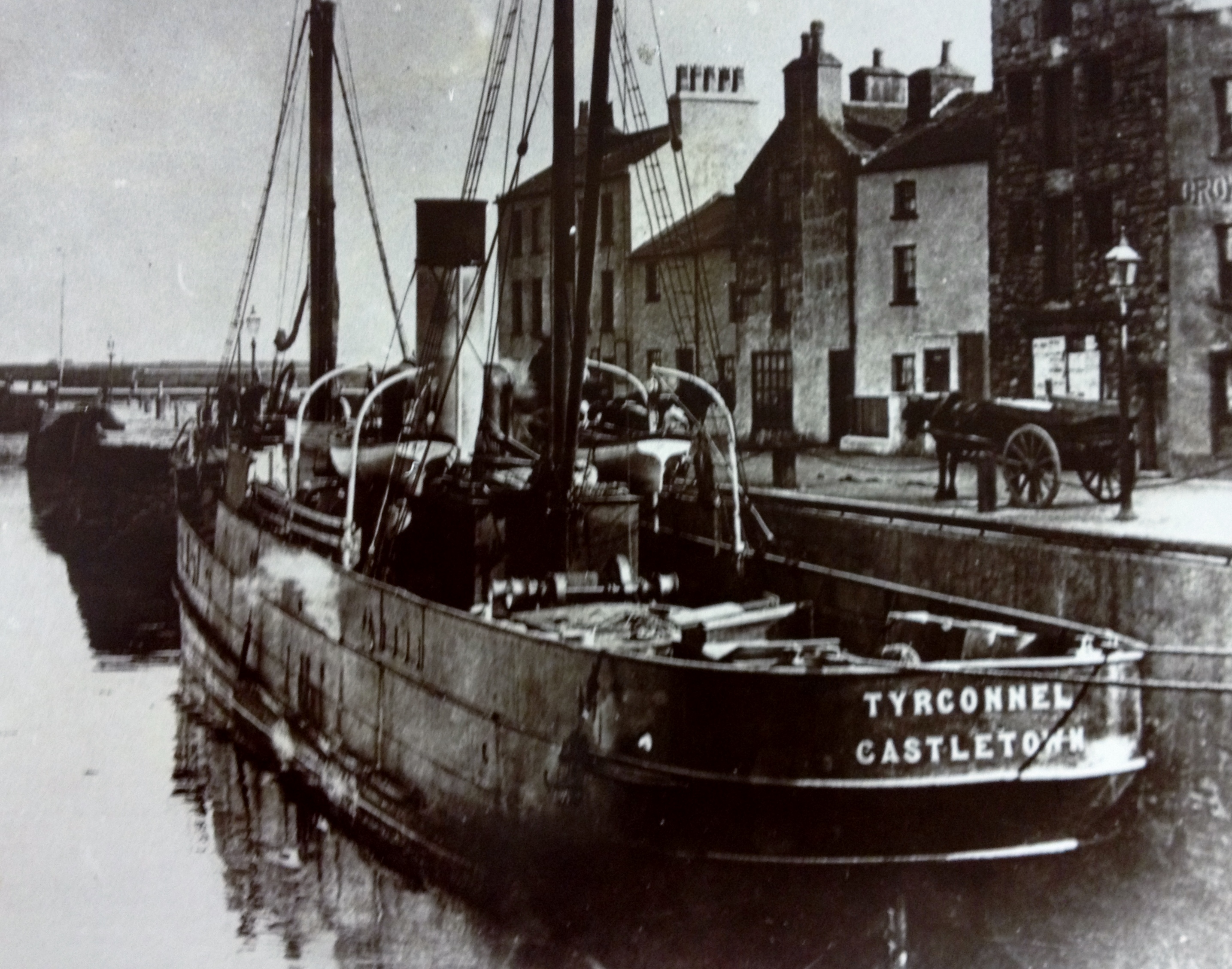
Tyrconnel pictured berthed at her home port, Castletown.

== Service life ==
She was first registered in Glasgow in 1892, then in Derry in 1895. No record of the vessel remains in the Derry Custom's House, but she presumably traded from the port until she was bought by the Manx Steam Trading Company of Castletown in 1902.

On Monday 12 September 1904, Tyrconnel went to the aid of the Castletown trading schooner Bessie. The Tyrconnel had spotted the Bessie approximately 3 miles off Niarbyl, Isle of Man flying a distress flag. Captain Collister proceeded to give assistance, however damage was sustained to one of Tyrconnel's lifeboats. The Bessie was eventually taken under tow by the Tyrconnel, and they proceeded to Peel Harbour.

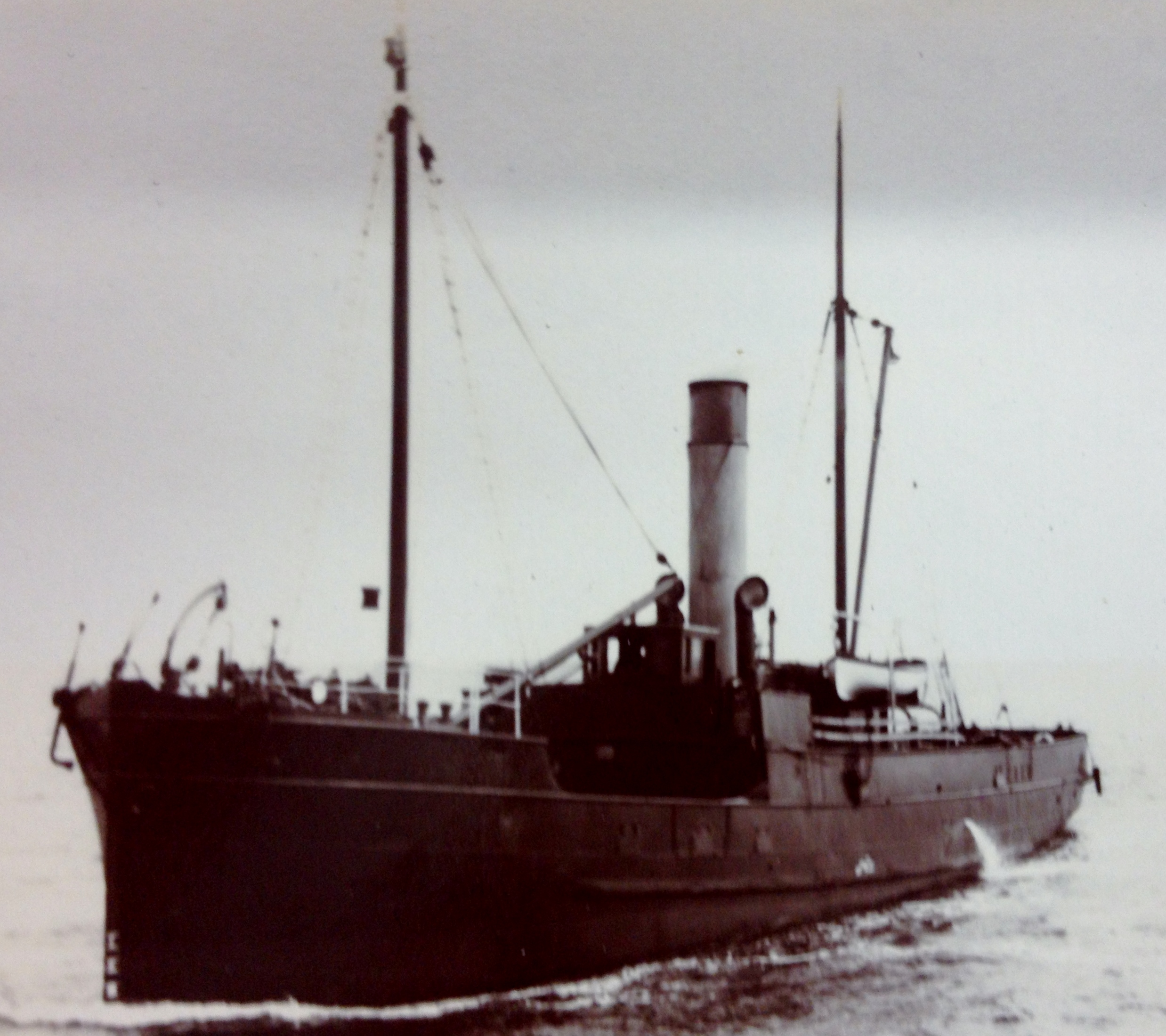
Tyrconnel. (Isle of Man)

She was acquired by the Isle of Man Steam Packet Company in 1911 at a cost of £4,875 (equivalent to £627,090 in 2023), and worked the coastal trade until 1932.

Tyrconnel was the first small cargo ship the Steam Packet had bought second hand. She looked typical of her class of vessel, with funnel and machinery amidships. Her funnel could be described as off-white with black top and this was never changed to the Steam Packet's familiar black and red.

== Disposal ==
Tyrconnel was withdrawn from service and sold to S.W. Coe & Company in 1932. Tyrconnel was broken up in Danzig, Poland, in 1934.

== Official number and code letters ==
Official numbers are issued by individual flag states. They should not be confused with IMO ship identification numbers. Tyrconnel had the UK Official Number 99794 and originally used the Code Letters N D P B.
