= Orange (word) =

Word in the English language

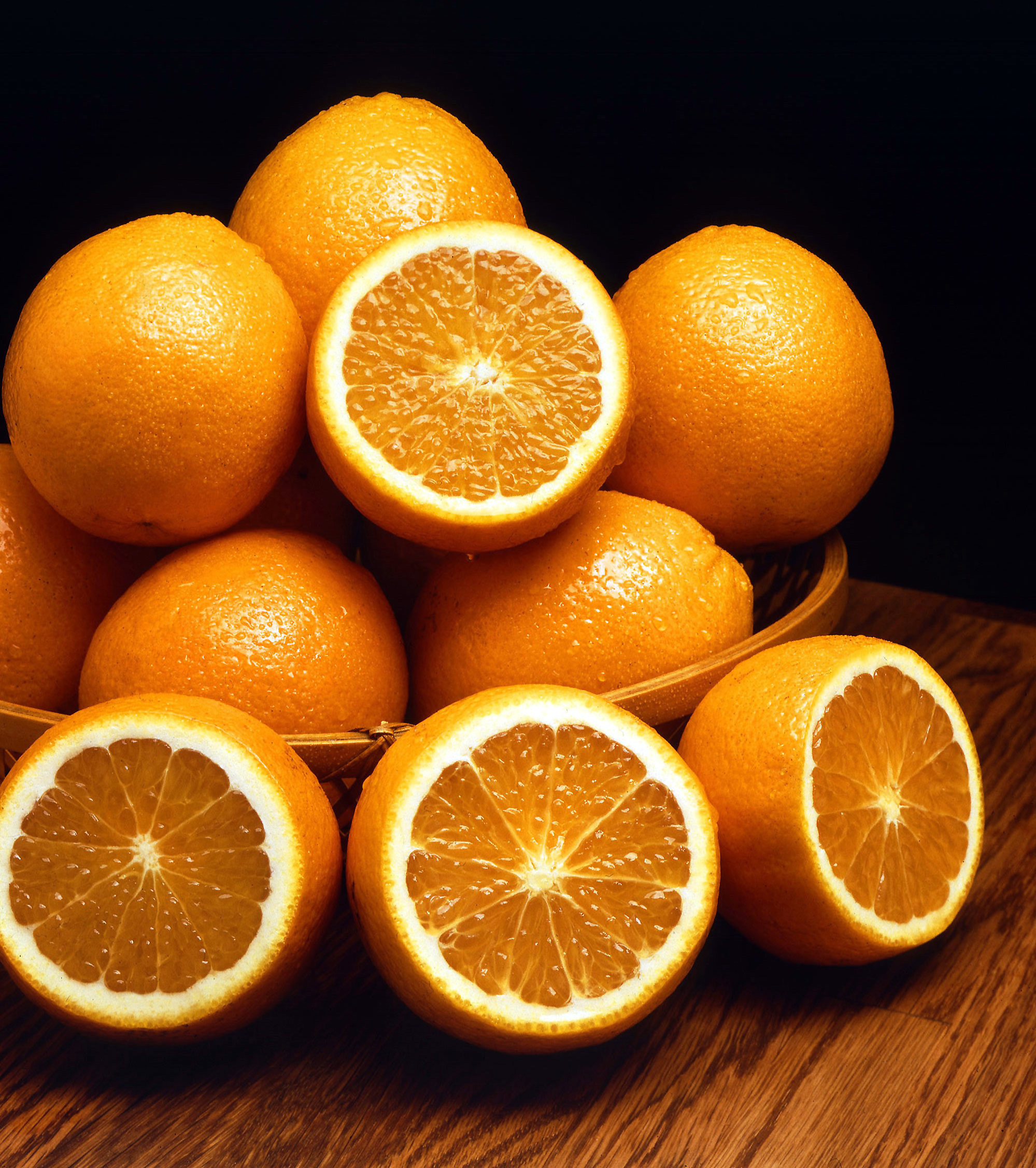
The word "orange" refers to a fruit and a color, and has other related meanings.

The word "orange" is a noun and an adjective in the English language. In both cases, it refers primarily to the orange fruit and the color orange, but has many other derivative meanings.

The word is derived from a Dravidian language, and it passed through numerous other languages including Sanskrit, Persian, and Old French before reaching the English language. The earliest uses of the word in English refer to the fruit, and the color was later named after the fruit. Before the English-speaking world was exposed to the fruit, the color was referred to as "yellow-red" (geoluread in Old English) or "red-yellow".

"Orange" has no true rhyme. There are several half rhymes or near-rhymes, as well as some proper nouns and compound words or phrases that rhyme with it. This lack of rhymes has inspired many humorous poems and songs.

== Etymology ==
The word "orange" entered Middle English from Old French and Anglo-Norman orenge. The earliest recorded use of the word in English is from the 13th century and referred to the fruit. The first recorded use of "orange" as a colour name in English was in 1502, in a description of clothing purchased for Margaret Tudor. Other sources cite the first recorded use as 1512, in a will now filed with the Public Record Office. It is generally thought that Old French calqued the Italian melarancio ("fruit of the orange tree", with mela "fruit") as pume orenge (with pume "fruit"). Although pume orenge is attested earlier than melarancio in available written sources, lexicographers believe that the Italian word is actually older.

The word ultimately derives from a Dravidian language – possibly Tamil நாரம் nāram or Telugu నారింజ nāriṃja — via Sanskrit नारङ्ग nāraṅgaḥ "orange tree". From there the word entered Persian نارنگ nārang and then Arabic نارنج nāranj. The initial n was lost through rebracketing in Italian and French, though some varieties of Arabic lost the n earlier. Compare Spanish cognate naranja with initial n

The place named Orange has a separate etymology. The Roman-Celtic settlement was founded in 36 or 35 BC and originally named Arausio, after a Celtic water god. The Principality of Orange was named for this place and not for the color. Some time after the sixteenth century, though, the color orange was adopted as a canting symbol of the House of Orange-Nassau. The color eventually came to be associated with Protestantism, as a result of the participation by the House of Orange on the Protestant side in the French Wars of Religion, the Williamite War in Ireland, and the Dutch Eighty Years' War.

== Pronunciation ==
With forest, warrant, horrible, etc., orange forms a class of English words where the North American pronunciation of what is pronounced as /ɒ/, the vowel in lot, in British Received Pronunciation varies between the vowel in north (/ɔ/ or /o/ depending on the cot–caught merger) and that in lot (/ɑ/ or /ɒ/ depending on the father–bother merger). The former is more common while the latter is mainly found on the East Coast of the United States. While many dictionaries of North American English include the north pronunciation as the primary or only variant, Merriam-Webster lists the lot variant first and glosses the north variant as "chiefly Northern & Midland" for orange but not for other words in the class (forest etc.). Its Collegiate Dictionary listed north first until the 1973 eighth edition, but has flipped the order since the 1983 ninth edition. Merriam-Webster is also unique in including monosyllabic variants (/ɑːrndʒ, ɔːrndʒ/).

== Rhyme ==
No common English word is a full rhyme for "orange", though there are half rhymes, such as "hinge", "lozenge", "syringe", and "porridge". Slang and otherwise uncommon examples exist. Although this property is not unique to the word—one study of 5,411 one-syllable English words found 80 words with no rhymes—the lack of rhyme for "orange" has garnered significant attention, and inspired many humorous verses.

Although "sporange", a variant of "sporangium", is an eye rhyme for "orange", it is not a true rhyme as its second syllable is pronounced with an unreduced vowel [-ændʒ], and often stressed.

There are a number of proper nouns which rhyme or nearly rhyme with "orange", including The Blorenge, a mountain in Wales, and Gorringe, a surname. US Naval Commander Henry Honychurch Gorringe, the captain of the USS Gettysburg, who discovered Gorringe Ridge in 1875, led Arthur Guiterman to quip in "Local Note":

In Sparkill buried lies that man of mark
Who brought the Obelisk to Central Park,
Redoubtable Commander H.H. Gorringe,
Whose name supplies the long-sought rhyme for "orange."

The slang word "blorange", a hair color between blond and orange, is a rhyme. It is attested from the early 2000s and appears in fashion-related media from about 2017.

Various linguistic or poetic devices provide for rhymes in some accents.

Compound words or phrases may give true or near rhymes. Examples include "door-hinge", "torn hinge", "or inch", and "a wrench". William Shepard Walsh attributes this verse featuring two multiple-word rhymes to Walter William Skeat:

I gave my darling child a lemon,
That lately grew its fragrant stem on;
And next, to give her pleasure more range,
I offered her a juicy orange.
And nuts, she cracked them in the door-hinge.

Enjambment can also provide for rhymes. One example is Willard Espy's poem, "The Unrhymable Word: Orange".

The four eng-
ineers
Wore orange
brassieres.

Another example by Tom Lehrer relies on the /ˈɑrəndʒ/ pronunciation commonly used on the East Coast of the United States:

Eating an orange
While making love
Makes for bizarre enj-
oyment thereof.

Rapper Eminem is noted for his ability to bend words so that they rhyme. In his song "Business" from the album The Eminem Show, he makes use of such word-bending to rhyme "orange":

Set to blow college dorm rooms doors off the hinges,
Oranges, peach, pears, plums, syringes,
VROOM VROOM! Yeah, here I come, I'm inches,

Nonce words are sometimes contrived to rhyme with "orange". Composers Charles Fox and Norman Gimbel wrote the song "Oranges Poranges" to be sung by the Witchiepoo character on the television programme H.R. Pufnstuf.

Oranges poranges, who says,
oranges poranges, who says,
oranges poranges, who says
there ain't no rhyme for oranges?

== See also ==
- Rhymes with Orange, a syndicated comic strip
