= Gorringe =

Gorringe is a rare English-language surname and may refer to:

- Allan Gorringe (1884–1918), English cricketer
- Daniel Gorringe (born 1992), Australian rules footballer
- Frank Gorringe (born 1889), Royal Air Force officer
- G. F. Gorringe (1868–1945), British Army officer
- Harry Gorringe (born 1928), Australian cricketer
- Henry Honychurch Gorringe (1841–1885), U.S. Navy officer
- Horrie Gorringe (1895–1994), Australian rules footballer
- Hubert Gorringe (1886–1958), English cricketer
- Timothy Gorringe (born 1946), British theologian

== See also ==
- Gorringe Ridge, a seamount in the Atlantic Ocean near Portugal
