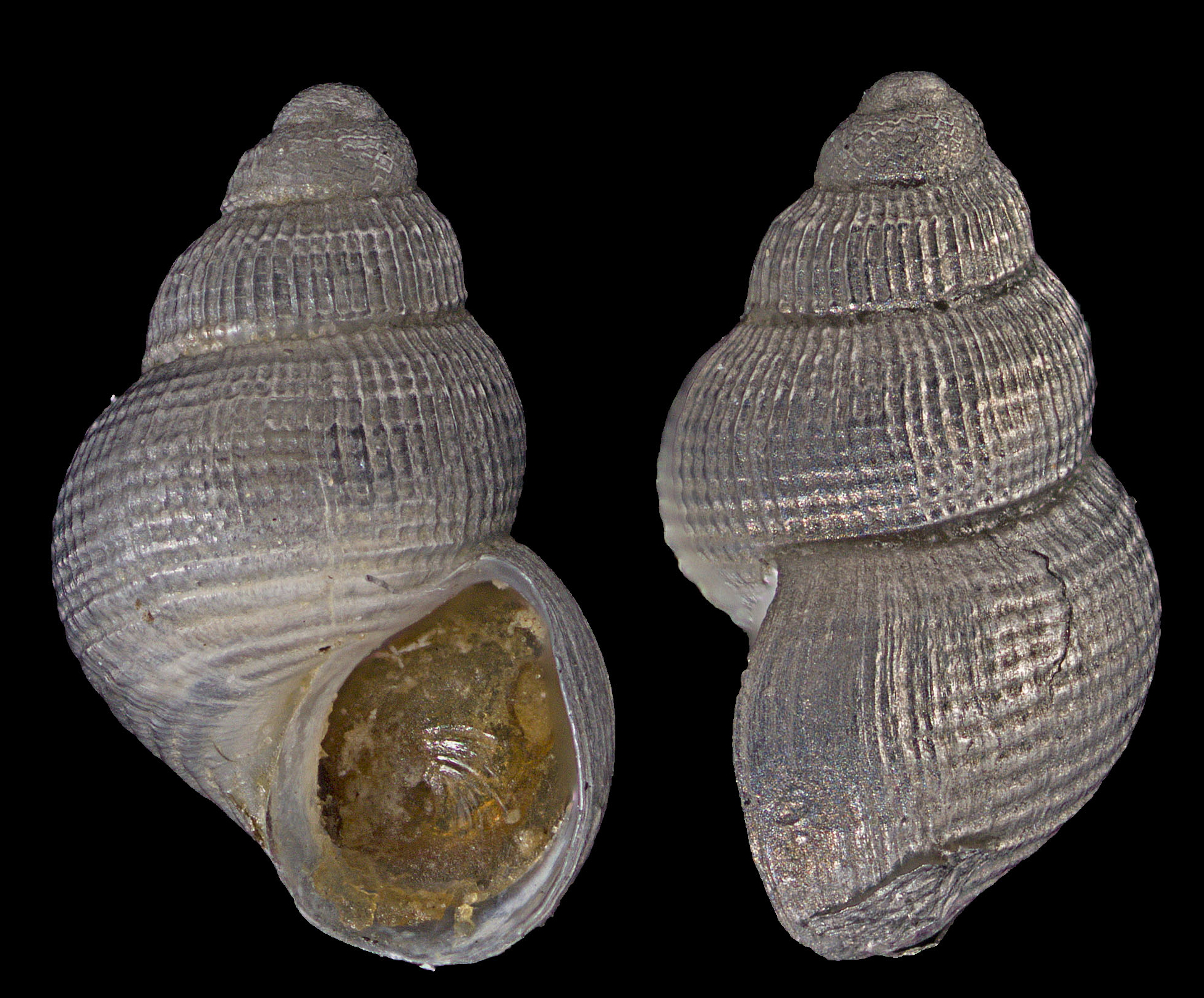
- Shell of Alvania zylensis (holotype at MNHN, Paris)

Scientific classification
- Kingdom: Animalia
- Phylum: Mollusca
- Class: Gastropoda
- Subclass: Caenogastropoda
- Order: Littorinimorpha
- Family: Rissoidae
- Genus: Alvania
- Species: A. zylensis

Binomial name
- Alvania zylensis Gofas & Warén, 1982

= Alvania zylensis =

Species of gastropod

Alvania zylensis is a species of small sea snail, a marine gastropod mollusk or micromollusk in the family Rissoidae.

== Description ==
The length of the shell varies between 1.5 mm and 2 mm.

== Distribution ==
This species occurs in the Atlantic Ocean off Morocco, the Ibero-Moroccan gulf, Strait of Gibraltar and the surroundings of Alboran Island, Gorringe Ridge and Ampère seamount, at depths of 20–200 m.
