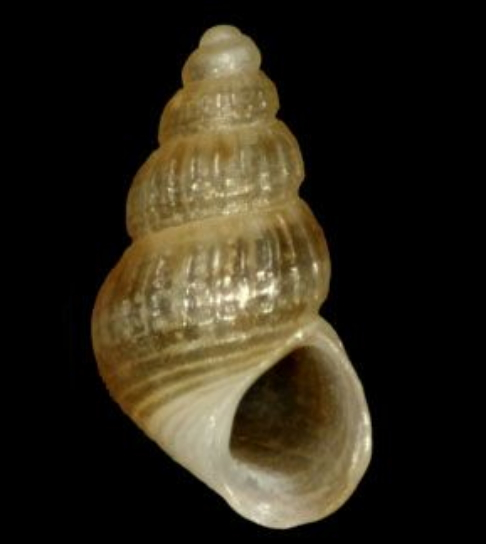
- Shell of Alvania vermaasi (specimen at the Natural History Museum, Rotterdam)

Scientific classification
- Kingdom: Animalia
- Phylum: Mollusca
- Class: Gastropoda
- Subclass: Caenogastropoda
- Order: Littorinimorpha
- Family: Rissoidae
- Genus: Alvania
- Species: A. vermaasi

Binomial name
- Alvania vermaasi van Aartsen, 1975

= Alvania vermaasi =

Species of gastropod

Alvania vermaasi is a species of minute sea snail, a marine gastropod mollusk or micromollusk in the family Rissoidae.

== Description ==
The length of the shell attains 2 mm.

== Distribution ==
This species occurs in the Alboran Sea off Bay of Algeciras, Spain; also in the Atlantic Ocean on the Gorringe Ridge.
