= List of shipwrecks in September 1845 =

The list of shipwrecks in September 1845 includes ships sunk, foundered, wrecked, grounded, or otherwise lost during September 1845.

== 1 September ==
List of shipwrecks: 1 September 1845
Ship	State	Description
Magnes Theodore	Flag unknown	The ship collided with General Washington (United States) and sank off Yarmouth with the loss of a crew member.

== 2 September ==
List of shipwrecks: 2 September 1845
Ship	State	Description
Appolonius	Flag unknown	The ship sprang a leak, capsized and was abandoned off "Utfo".
Chatham	United States	The full-rigged ship sprang a leak and was abandoned in the Atlantic Ocean. All on board were rescued by a French vessel. She was on a voyage from Liverpool, Lancashire, United Kingdom to New Orleans, Louisiana.
Friendship	United Kingdom	The ship ran aground on the Haisborough Sands, in the North Sea off the coast of Norfolk. She was refloated and put in to Great Yarmouth, Norfolk in a leaky condition.
Jeune Sophie	France	The ship was wrecked on Kwang Point, Netherlands East Indies. She was on a voyage from Samarang, to Batavia and France.
Kronprinz von Hanover	Kingdom of Hanover	The ship was driven ashore near Bremerhaven. She was on a voyage from Baltimore, Maryland, United States to Bremen.
Precurseur	Belgium	The ship foundered in the English Channel 10 nautical miles (19 km) west of Portland, Dorset, United Kingdom. Her crew survived.
Tally Ho	United Kingdom	The schooner collided with the schooner Zampa (France) in the Atlantic Ocean. She was abandoned the next day; her crew were rescued by Zampa. Tally Ho was later discovered by William Wickham (United Kingdom), which put five of her crew aboard and took her in tow. She arrived at The Downs on 17 September.
Trial	(United Kingdom of Great Britain and Ireland) British North America	The schooner was lost off the coast of Labrador.

== 3 September ==
List of shipwrecks: 3 September 1845
Ship	State	Description
Hebe	United Kingdom	The mud engine foundered in the North Sea off Southwold, Suffolk. Her crew were rescued. She was on a voyage from Hull, Yorkshire to Bristol, Gloucestershire.
Roe	United Kingdom	The ship was driven ashore at Rattray Head, Aberdeenshire. She was on a voyage from Liverpool, Lancashire to Perth.

== 4 September ==
List of shipwrecks: 4 September 1845
Ship	State	Description
Caledonia	United Kingdom	The ship struck a sunken rock off Lima, Peru and was damaged. She put back to Lima.
Seaflower	United Kingdom	The ship was holed by her anchor and sank at Wexford. She was on a voyage from Gloucester to Wexford.

== 5 September ==
List of shipwrecks: 5 September 1845
Ship	State	Description
Rebecca	United Kingdom	The ship ran aground on the Triangle Key. She was on a voyage from British Honduras to Cork.

== 6 September ==
List of shipwrecks: 6 September 1845
Ship	State	Description
Briton's Queen	United Kingdom	The ship was driven ashore and wrecked at Plateau, Inverness County, Nova Scotia, British North America.
Minerva	United Kingdom	The ship departed from Arkhangelsk, Russia for Liverpool, Lancashire. No further trace, presumed foundered with the loss of all hands.
Tigress	United Kingdom	The ship was driven ashore at Christiansand, Norway. She was on a voyage from Hamburg to Hull, Yorkshire. She was refloated and taken in to Christiansand.
Wilberforce	United Kingdom	The ship ran aground at Starcross, Devon. She was refloated but was holed by her anchor and was consequently beached.

== 7 September ==
List of shipwrecks: 7 September 1845
Ship	State	Description
Charles	United Kingdom	The ship ran aground on the Maplin Sand, in the North Sea off the coast of Essex. She was refloated and proceeded to the River Thames.
Cosmopolite	France	The ship was wrecked on Fortune Island, Bahamas. Her crew were rescued. She was on a voyage from Aux Cayes, Haiti to Marseille, Bouches-du-Rhône.
Industry	(United Kingdom of Great Britain and Ireland) British North America	The schooner was wrecked at Rimouski, Province of Canada. She was on a voyage from Montreal to Halifax, Nova Scotia.
Malabar	United Kingdom	The ship ran aground in the Saint Lawrence River downstream of Saint Thomas, Province of Canada.
Parkins	United Kingdom	The brig ran aground on the Maplin Sand. She was refloated and proceeded to the River Thames.
Skuon	United Kingdom	The ship was driven ashore in the Saint Lawrence River at "Saint Islets", Province of Canada.
Young Daniel	United Kingdom	The ship was driven ashore at Covehithe, Suffolk. She was refloated and taken in to Lowestoft.
Wetumpka	United Kingdom	The ship was driven ashore and damaged at the mouth of the Guardiaro. She was refloated the next day.

== 8 September ==
List of shipwrecks: 8 September 1845
Ship	State	Description
Anna	United Kingdom	The ship was damaged off Nash Point, Glamorgan by an explosion in her cargo of coal. She was on a voyage from Cardiff, Glamorgan to London. She put back to Cardiff.
Francis Joseph	France	The brig ran aground on the Coumkall Sands, in the Dardanelles. She was refloated.
Hermelinda	Flag unknown	The ship struck a rock off "Santa Anna Island" and foundered. Her crew were rescued.
St. Pierre	France	The lightship was run into by the steamship Rainbow (United Kingdom) and sank in the English Channel off Havre de Grâce, Seine-Inférieure.
Vectis	United Kingdom	The cutter yacht was wrecked on the Bognor Rocks, in the English Channel off the coast of Sussex. Her crew survived.

== 9 September ==
List of shipwrecks: 9 September 1845
Ship	State	Description
Active	United Kingdom	The ship sprang a leak and was beached in Plettenberg Bay. Her crew were rescued.
Ameron	(United Kingdom of Great Britain and Ireland) British North America	The ship collided with Wellington (United Kingdom) and foundered in the Atlantic Ocean. Her crew were rescued.
Atalanta	United Kingdom	The schooner ran aground on the Florida Reef. She was on a voyage from Matanzas, Cuba to Liverpool, Lancashire. She was refloated and taken in to Key West, Florida, United States.
Dumfriesshire	United Kingdom	The ship was wrecked on Anticosti Island, Nova Scotia, British North America. Her crew survived. She was on a voyage from London to Quebec City, Province of Canada, British North America.
Feronia	United Kingdom	The ship was wrecked on the Florida Reef. She was on a voyage from Jamaica to London.
Hannibal	Stettin	The ship was wrecked on the north point of Bornholm, Denmark. She was on a voyage from Memel, Prussia to Dundee, Forfarshire, United Kingdom.
Rosanna	United Kingdom	The brig was deliberately run ashore in St. George's Bay in a case of attempted barratry. She was on a voyage from Quebec City to the Clyde. She was refloated on 16 October with assistance from HMS Hyacinth (Royal Navy) and taken in to St. John's, Newfoundland.

== 10 September ==
List of shipwrecks: 10 September 1845
Ship	State	Description
Bror	(Russian Empire) Grand Duchy of Finland	The ship ran aground and was wrecked on a reef off "Faes Island". She was on a voyage from Pori to London, United Kingdom.
Charlotte Elizabeth	Sweden	The ship ran ashore on Cardonholm and was damaged. She was refloated and put in to Norrköping.
Cherub	United Kingdom	The ship ran aground on the Corton Sand, in the North Sea off the coast of Suffolk. She was refloated but consequently foundered.
Emma Henrietta	Hamburg	The ship was driven ashore on Neuwerk. She was refloated.
Susan	United Kingdom	The ship was driven ashore south east of Cádiz, Spain. She was on a voyage from London to Malta. She was refloated and resumed her journey.

== 11 September ==
List of shipwrecks: 11 September 1845
Ship	State	Description
Tees	United Kingdom	The paddle tug sprang a leak and foundered in the North Sea off Inchcape. Her crew were rescued.
Unie	Netherlands	The ship departed from Arkhangelsk, Russia for Amsterdam, North Holland. No further trace, presumed foundered with the loss of all hands.

== 12 September ==
List of shipwrecks: 12 September 1845
Ship	State	Description
Dayton	Republic of Texas	The steamboat was destroyed by a boiler explosion at Ingleside with the loss of eight lives. She was on a voyage from Corpus Christi to San José Island.
Freya	(Russian Empire) Grand Duchy of Finland	The ship was wrecked south of "Wringle Island". She was on a voyage from Saint Petersburg, Russia to Pori.
General Ledgerton	United Kingdom	The brig was driven ashore on Öland, Sweden. She was on a voyage from Riga, Russia to London. She was refloated on 3 October and taken in to Visby for repairs.
Graham	United Kingdom	The schooner foundered in the English Channel off St. Catherine's Point, Isle of Wight. Her crew were rescued. She was on a voyage from Teignmouth, Devon to Leith, Lothian.
Itenerant	United Kingdom	The ship ran aground on the Newcombe Sand, in the North Sea off the coast of Suffolk. She was refloated but found to be in a sinking condition.
Jane Blair	(United Kingdom of Great Britain and Ireland) British North America	The ship ran aground at Tibbitt's Cove, Province of Canada and was damaged.

== 13 September ==
List of shipwrecks: 13 September 1845
Ship	State	Description
Anthony and Ann	United Kingdom	The ship was driven ashore near Copenhagen, Denmark. She was later refloated and put in to Helsingør for repairs.
Black Warrior	(United Kingdom of Great Britain and Ireland) New Zealand	The ship was leaving Ohau (near Levin, New Zealand) and hit the bar at the mouth of the Ohau River. Damage seemed minor so she continued on her voyage for Wellington. The damage was worse than it seemed, and she foundered and sank off Sinclair Head. All crew were saved.
Czar Peter	Russia	The ship was driven ashore at Thisted, Denmark. Her crew were rescued. She had become a wreck by 23 September.
Dynameme	United Kingdom	The schooner was wrecked on the Sestos Reef, on the Grain Coast of Africa. Her crew survived.
Hermitage	United Kingdom	The ship was wrecked on this date. Her crew survived.
Pedlar	(United Kingdom of Great Britain and Ireland) Van Diemen's Land	The schooner struck rocks and sank off the Shear Beacon. All o board were rescued.
Supply	United Kingdom	The schooner foundered off the Smalls Lighthouse. Her crew were rescued. She was on a voyage from Neath, Glamorgan to Cork.

== 14 September ==
List of shipwrecks: 14 September 1845
Ship	State	Description
Ayrshire	United Kingdom	The ship was driven ashore at Carlingford, County Louth. She was on a voyage from Quebec City, Province of Canada, British North America to Newry, County Antrim.
Brothers	United Kingdom	The ship ran aground off Great Yarmouth, Norfolk. She was refloated but consequently foundered off Pakefield, Suffolk. Her crew were rescued.
Dependant	United Kingdom	The ship, which had sprung a leak in the Atlantic Ocean on 11 September, was abandoned. Her crew were rescued by John White (United Kingdom). Dependant was on a voyage from Bridgwater, Somerset to Quebec City.
Doris	French Navy	The schooner capsized in a squall off Brest, Finistère with the loss of 46 of the 88 people on board. She was on a voyage from Martinique to Brest.
Governor Halkett	(United Kingdom of Great Britain and Ireland) British North America	The ship sank in Wallasey Pool.
Hebe	Netherlands	The ship was driven ashore near "Lassimo". She was on a voyage from Bucharest, Wallachia to Antwerp, Belgium.
Maria	Netherlands	The ship was sighted off Helsingør, Denmark whilst on a voyage from Danzig to Amstermdam, North Holland. No further trace, presumed foundered with the loss of all hands.
Minera	United Kingdom	The ship was sighted off Helsingør whilst on a voyage from Danzig to Amsterdam. No further trace, presumed foundered with the loss of all hands.
Venus	Sweden	The ship was driven ashore at Östergarn, Gotland. She was on a voyage from "Carlshaven" to "Holberg". She was refloated and taken in to "Ratterhamnerswick" for repairs.

== 15 September ==
List of shipwrecks: September 1845
Ship	State	Description
Foreningen	Netherlands	The ship was sighted off Helsingør whilst on a voyage from Danzig to Amsterdam, North Holland. No further trace, presumed foundered with the loss of all hands.
Hope	(United Kingdom of Great Britain and Ireland) Jersey	The ship ran aground off Guernsey, Channel Islands.
Letitia	United Kingdom	The ship was wrecked on Frigate Island, in the Cargados with the loss of at least eleven of her crew.
Samuel and Julia	(United Kingdom of Great Britain and Ireland) Jersey	The ship foundered in the Atlantic Ocean off St Mary's, Isles of Scilly. Her crew were rescued.
Shamrock	United Kingdom	The paddle steamer foundered in the Atlantic Ocean (50°51′N 10°50′W). Her fifteen crew were rescued by the brig Jane (United Kingdom). Shamrock was on a voyage from Liverpool, Lancashire to Saint John, New Brunswick, British North America.
Victoria	United Kingdom	The brig ran aground in the Vetteville Passage, on the north French coast.

== 16 September ==
List of shipwrecks: 16 September 1845
Ship	State	Description
Achilles	United Kingdom	The ship caught fire whilst on a voyage from Leith, Lothian to Calcutta, India. She put in to Simons Bay, where she was scuttled. She was later refloated.
Alerte	France	The ship was in collision with another vessel and sank. Her crew were rescuedby Jeune Palmyre (France). She was on a voyage from Antwerp, Belgium to Havre de Grâce, Seine-Inférieure and/or Honfleur, Calvados.
Johannes	Prussia	The ship was driven ashore at Pillau. She was refloated on 25 September.
Nornen	Flag unknown	The ship was wrecked on the Goodwin Sands, Kent, United Kingdom. Her crew were rescued.
Solé	Hamburg	The brigantine was driven ashore and wrecked near Jews Gat, east of Rye Harbour, Sussex, United Kingdom with the loss of seven of her ten crew. She was on a voyage from Argostoli, United States of the Ionian Islands to Hamburg.
St. John	(United Kingdom of Great Britain and Ireland) British North America	The ship ran aground in the Saint Lawrence River at Sainte-Anne-de-Beaupré, Province of Canada and was damaged. She was refloated and put in to Gaspé.
Strathmore	United Kingdom	The ship capsized at Portmadoc, Caernarfonshire and was severely damaged. She was later righted.

== 17 September ==
List of shipwrecks: 17 September 1845
Ship	State	Description
Brothers	United Kingdom	The ship ran aground on the Barnard Sand, in the North Sea off the coast of Suffolk. She was on a voyage from South Shields, County Durham to London. She was refloated but was consequently beached at Pakefield. She sank the next day.
Dykes	United Kingdom	The ship was driven ashore and capsized at the mouth of the River Ribble. She was on a voyage from Quebec City, Province of Canada, British North America to Liverpool, Lancashire. She was righted.
Isabella	United Kingdom	The ship was driven ashore and capsized at the mouth of the River Ribble. She was on a voyage from St. Stephen, New Brunswick, British North America to Liverpool. She was righted.

== 18 September ==
List of shipwrecks: 18 September 1845
Ship	State	Description
Ajax	United Kingdom	The ship was wrecked on The Shingles, off the Isle of Wight. Her crew were rescued. She was on a voyage from Kertch, Russia to Portsmouth, Hampshire.
Bonne Henriette	France	The ship was at Mardike Point, Nord. She was on a voyage from Newcastle upon Tyne, Northumberland, United Kingdom to Nantes, Loire-Inférieure.
Freedom	United Kingdom	The ship ran aground and was severely damaged at Wisbech, Cambridgeshire. She was on a voyage from Wisbech to Goole, Yorkshire.
John Jardine	United Kingdom	The ship ran aground in the Humber. She was on a voyage from Saldanha Bay, Cape Colony to Hull, Yorkshire.
Queen	United Kingdom	The ship ran aground at Quebec City and was damaged.
Speculation	Grand Duchy of Oldenburg	The ship was wrecked off Bremen. Her crew were rescued. She was on a voyage from Amsterdam, North Holland, Netherlands to Hamburg.

== 19 September ==
List of shipwrecks: 19 September 1845
Ship	State	Description
Belle Henriette	France	The ship was driven ashore at Fort-Mardyke, Nord. She was on a voyage from Newcastle upon Tyne, Northumberland to Nantes, Loire-Inférieure.
Endeavour	United Kingdom	The ship was driven ashore 2 nautical miles (3.7 km) south of Ayr. She was later refloated and taken in to Ayr.
Friend	United Kingdom	The ship was driven ashore and wrecked in Glenarn Bay. Her crew were rescued.
Glory	Hamburg	The ship was driven ashore at Thisted, Denmark. Her crew were rescued. She was on a voyage from Trieste to Stettin.
Green	United Kingdom	The ship was wrecked at St. Peter's, Nova Scotia, British North America. She was on a voyage from Miramichi, New Brunswick, British North America to Liverpool, Lancashire.
Port Royal	United Kingdom	The ship was driven ashore and wrecked on Fanø, Denmark. She was on a voyage from Cardiff, Glamorgan to Saint Petersburg, Russia. She had become a wreck by 29 September.
Thomas	United Kingdom	The ship ran aground and was damaged on the Cable Ground, in the Baltic Sea.
Yarm	United Kingdom	The ship was driven ashore at Swansea, Glamorgan.

== 20 September ==
List of shipwrecks: 20 September 1845
Ship	State	Description
Anna	United Kingdom	The ship ran aground in the Pará River. She was on a voyage from the Pará Rive to Gibraltar. She was consequently condemned.
Endeavour	United Kingdom	The ship was driven ashore 2 nautical miles (3.7 km) south of Ayr. She was later refloated and taken in to Ayr.
King Orry	(United Kingdom of Great Britain and Ireland) Isle of Man	The paddle steamer was in collision with the steamship Prince (United Kingdom) in the River Mersey and was beached. She was on a voyage from Douglas, Isle of Man to Liverpool, Lancashire. She was later refloated and taken in to Liverpool.
Sarah	United Kingdom	The ship struc a wreck on the Maplin Sand, in the North Sea off the coast of Essex and sank. Her crew were rescued.
Teresa America	Kingdom of Sardinia	The barque was wrecked on the eastern point of "Elbados Flores". She was on a voyage from Montevideo, Uruguay to Pernambuco, Brazil.
Thomas	United Kingdom	The ship was driven ashore south of "Mompstangl", Sweden. She was on a voyage from Hull, Yorkshire to Nyekiobing, Sweden. She was later refloated.

== 21 September ==
List of shipwrecks: 21 September 1845
Ship	State	Description
Berenice	France	The brig ran aground on the Half-moon Key. She was on a voyage from Havre de Grâce, Seine-Inférieure to Saint Thomas, Virgin Islands. She was refloated and taken to Glover's Reef.
Brothers	United Kingdom	The ship was wrecked on Scatterie Island, Nova Scotia, British North America. Her crew were rescued.
Dart	United Kingdom	The ship struck a sunken rock in St. Aubins Bay and was abandoned by her crew. She was subsequently taken in to Jersey, Channel Islands in a severely damaged condition.
Jane	United Kingdom	The ship was driven ashore on Anholt, Denmark. Her crew were rescued.
Lively	United Kingdom	The ship was driven ashore and severely damaged at Dunbar, Lothian. She was on a voyage from Leith, Lothian to Whitby, Yorkshire.
Mary	United Kingdom	The brig was driven ashore and sank at South Foreland, Kent. Her crew were rescued. She was on a voyage from Sunderland, County Durham to Newhaven, Sussex.

== 22 September ==
List of shipwrecks: 22 September 1845
Ship	State	Description
Antelope	United Kingdom	The ship was driven ashore and severely damaged 4 nautical miles (7.4 km) east of Dunbar, Lothian. She was on a voyage from Stettin to Cork.
Codrington	United Kingdom	The ship ran aground on the Belfast Reef, north of Antigua. She was refloated.
Marianne	Netherlands	The ship was sighted off Helsingør, Denmark whilst on a voyage from Saint Petersburg, Russia to Amsterdam, North Holland. No further trace, presumed foundered with the loss of all hands.
Oscar	Norway	The ship sprang a leak and foundered. Her crew were rescued. She was on a voyage from Stromstad to Saint-Valery-sur-Somme, France.

== 23 September ==
List of shipwrecks: 23 September 1845
Ship	State	Description
Elizabeth	United Kingdom	The ship ran aground on the Kentish Knock. She was on a voyage from a Mediterranean port to Aberdeen. She was refloated and taken in to Harwich, Essex.
Pandora	United Kingdom	The ship was driven ashore at "Tolbuchin", Russia. She was on a voyage from Newcastle upon Tyne, Northumberland to Kronstadt, Russia. She was refloated and taken in to Kronstadt.

== 24 September ==
List of shipwrecks: 24 September 1845
Ship	State	Description
Catherine	United Kingdom	The ship was driven ashore at Cape Hatteras, North Carolina, United States.
Defiance	(United Kingdom of Great Britain and Ireland) British North America	The ship sprang a leak and sank whilst on a voyage from Herring Cove to Halifax, Nova Scotia. All on board were rescued.
Hennatop	United Kingdom	The ship capsized off New Carlisle, Province of Canada, British North America. She was consequently condemned.
Symmetry	United Kingdom	The ship ran aground and sank at South Shields, County Durham. She was on a voyage from Quebec City, Province of Canada, British North America to South Shields.

== 25 September ==
List of shipwrecks: 25 September 1845
Ship	State	Description
Gebina	Flag unknown	The ship was driven ashore and wrecked near "Smorholm". Her crew were rescued.
Vicenta	Spain	The ship capsized in Marcus Sound, off the coast of Norway, Five of her crew were rescued.

== 27 September ==
List of shipwrecks: 27 September 1845
Ship	State	Description
Alerte	France	The ship was in collision with another vessel and foundered. Her crew were rescued by a Spanish vessel. She was on a voyage from Antwerp, Belgium to Havre de Grâce, Seine-Inférieure.
Emma Olivia	United Kingdom	The ship was driven ashore and damaged at Boulogne-sur-Mer, Pas-de-Calais, France. She was on a voyage from Sunderland, County Durham to Boulogne. She was later refloated and taken in to Boulogne.
Friendship	(United Kingdom of Great Britain and Ireland) British North America	The schooner was wrecked at "Mistick", New Brunswick. All on board were rescued. She was on a voyage from Saint John, New Brunswick to Cornwallis.
Sans Repos	Belgium	The ship was driven ashore at Rødholmen, Norway. She was on a voyage from Bergen to Leuven. She was refloated.
Three Brothers	(United Kingdom of Great Britain and Ireland) British North America	The ship was driven ashore at the Green Island Lighthouse.
Wilhelmine	Netherlands	The ship was driven ashore at Orfordness, Suffolk, United Kingdom. She was on a voyage from Liverpool, Lancashire, United Kingdom to Dordrecht, South Holland. She was refloated.

== 28 September ==
List of shipwrecks: 28 September 1845
Ship	State	Description
Ann	United Kingdom	The brig was holed by her anchor and was beached at Recoleta, Buenos Aires, Argentina.
Caroline	Prussia	The ship was wrecked at Thisted, Denmark. Her crew were rescued.
Gizhiga (Гижига)	Imperial Russian Navy	The transport ship ran aground and capsized at the entrance to Avacha Bay, with the loss of fourteen lives. After a few hours, the wreck floated free and drifted ashore, allowing the rest of those on board to make it to land.
Mary Ann	United Kingdom	The ship was driven ashore at Longhope, Orkney Islands.
Starling	United Kingdom	The steamboat was holed by an anchor and sank in the River Tyne at Moteby's Hole. Her crew survived.

== 29 September ==
List of shipwrecks: 29 September 1845
Ship	State	Description
Alexander	United Kingdom	The ship was driven ashore and wrecked near Memel, Prussia.
Antelope	United Kingdom	The sloop was wrecked at Skateraw, Kincardineshire. Her crew survived.
Harlequin	United Kingdom	The schooner caught fire off the Sand Heads, India and sank. Her crew were rescued. She was on a voyage from China to Calcutta, India.
Rapid	United Kingdom	The steamship beached at Den Helder, North Holland, Netherlands. She was on a voyage from Harlingen, Friesland, Netherlands to London.
Superb	(United Kingdom of Great Britain and Ireland) British North America	The schooner struck a sunken rock and was beached at Sheet Harbour, Nova Scotia. She was on a voyage from Halifax, Nova Scotia to Miramichi, New Brunswick.

== 30 September ==
List of shipwrecks: 30 September 1845
Ship	State	Description
Anna	United Kingdom	The ship ran aground in the Pará River. She was on a voyage from Pará, Brazil to Gibraltar. She was consequently condemned.
Atentio	Netherlands	The ship was sighted off Helsingor, Denmark whilst on a voyage from Stettin to Amsterdam, North Holland. No further trace, presumed foundered with the loss of all hands.
Catharina	United Kingdom	The ship ran aground at Port Talbot, Glamorgan. She was on a voyage from Quebec City, Province of Canada, British North America to Port Talbot. She was refloated and take in to port.
Gode Haab	Netherlands	The ship was sighted off Helsingør whilst on a voyage from Copenhagen, Denmark to Amsterdam. No further trace, presumed foundered with the loss of all hands.
Jonge Derks	Netherlands	The galiot was driven ashore and wrecked at Memel, Prussia.
Vanguard	United Kingdom	The paddle steamer ran aground the Long Rock, off Ballywalter, County Down. She was on a voyage from Dublin to Glasgow, Renfrewshire. She was refloated the next day and resumed her voyage.

== Unknown date ==
List of shipwrecks: Unknown date in September 1845
Ship	State	Description
Active	(United Kingdom of Great Britain and Ireland) Cape Colony	The ship was run ashore in Plettenberg Bay. Her crew were rescued.
Annachina Hendrika	Netherlands	The ship was driven ashore on Heligoland before 8 September and was abandoned by her crew. She was on a voyage from Groningen to London, United Kingdom.
Atlas	United Kingdom	The ship sprang a leak, capsized and was abandoned in the Atlantic Ocean after 24 September. Her crew were rescued by Lady Bagot (United Kingdom). Atlas was on a voyage from Quebec City, Province of Canada, British North America to Sunderland, County Durham.
Belfast	United Kingdom	The full-rigged ship was abandoned in the Atlantic Ocean before 27 September.
Beppo	(United Kingdom of Great Britain and Ireland) New South Wales	The schooner was driven ashore in the Macleay River.
Crusader	United Kingdom	The ship ran aground off Saltholm, Denmark. She was refloated on 8 September.
C. W. E. R.	(United Kingdom of Great Britain and Ireland) British North America	The brig departed from Halifax, Nova Scotia for the West Indies. Subsequently wrecked in the Atlantic Ocean.
Glenview	United Kingdom	The ship was abandoned in the Atlantic Ocean before 25 September.
Gustava	Sweden	The ship was wrecked on Læsø, Denmark before 9 September. Her crew survived.
Hibernia	United Kingdom	The fishing smack was run down and sunk in the Atlantic Ocean off Cape Clear Island, County Donegal by Kingalock (United Kingdom). Her five crew were rescued by Kingalock.
Hudson	United Kingdom	The ship was abandoned in the Mediterranean Sea before 22 September. She was subsequently towed in to Athens, Greece by Oscar (United Kingdom), arriving on 30 September.
James Watt	United Kingdom	The ship was wrecked in Narva Bay before 22 September.
Johanna	Stettin	The ship foundered in the North Sea with the loss of all but two of her crew. Survivors were rescued by a Dutch fishing vessel. She was on a voyage from Stettin to London.
Lunar	United Kingdom	The ship was abandoned in the Atlantic Ocean before 8 September.
Thistle	United Kingdom	The ship was driven ashore in the Gut of Cawen. She was on a voyage from Pugwash, Nova Scotia, British North America to Cork. She was refloated and put in to Ship Harbour on 29 September.
Voss	Flag unknown	The kuff was abandoned in the North Sea. She was taken in to Bremen on 26 September.
