= USS Gettysburg (1858) =

US Navy steamer (1858–1862)

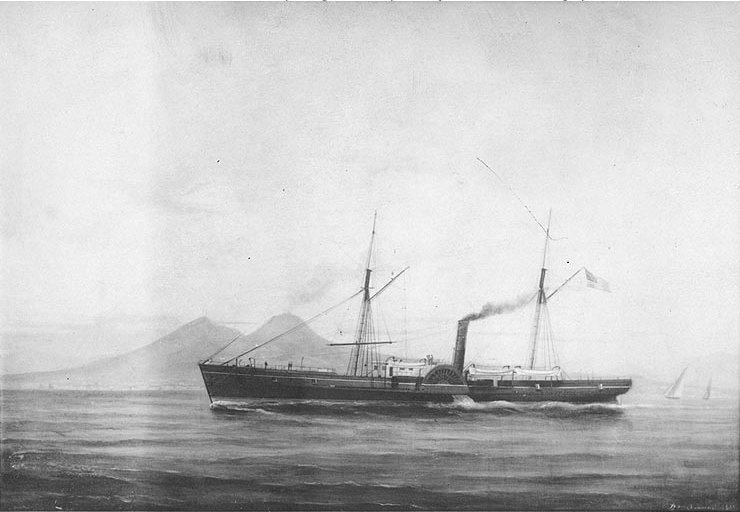
- USS Gettysburg during Mediterranean service in the 1870s

History

Isle of Man
- Name: Douglas
- Namesake: Douglas, Isle of Man
- Owner: Isle of Man Steam Packet Company
- Operator: Isle of Man Steam Packet Company
- Route: Douglas–Liverpool
- Builder: Robert Napier and Sons, Glasgow, Scotland
- Cost: £17,500, plus an allowance of £5,000 from Napier for SS King Orry
- Launched: 28 May 1858
- Completed: 1858
- In service: 3 July 1858
- Out of service: November 1862
- Identification: Official Number 20683; Code Letters H C F T
- Fate: Sold 1862

Confederate States of America
- Name: Douglas (1862–1863); Margaret and Jessie (1863)
- Namesake: Douglas was a previous name retained; Margaret and Jessie were the Confederate owner′s daughters
- Owner: Charleston Import and Export Company, Charleston, South Carolina
- Acquired: November 1862
- In service: 2 December 1862
- Fate: Captured 5 November 1863

United States
- Name: USS Gettysburg
- Namesake: Gettysburg, Pennsylvania, site of the Battle of Gettysburg
- Operator: United States Navy
- Acquired: by capture 5 November 1863
- Commissioned: 2 May 1864
- Decommissioned: 23 June 1865
- Recommissioned: 3 December 1866
- Decommissioned: 1 March 1867
- Recommissioned: 3 March 1868
- Decommissioned: 8 October 1869
- Recommissioned: 6 November 1873
- Decommissioned: 9 April 1875
- Recommissioned: 21 September 1875
- Decommissioned: 26 June 1876
- Recommissioned: 30 September 1876
- Decommissioned: 6 May 1879
- Fate: Sold 8 May 1879

General characteristics (as steam packet)
- Type: Sidewheel steam packet
- Tonnage: 700 gross register tons (GRT)
- Length: 205 ft 0 in (62.5 m)
- Beam: 26 ft 0 in (7.9 m)
- Depth: 14 ft 0 in (4.3 m)
- Installed power: Nominal horse power believed to be 260 shp (190 kW).
- Propulsion: Side-lever steam engine, two sidewheel paddles
- Speed: 17.75 kn (20.43 mph; 32.87 km/h) (trials); 17.25 knots (32 km/h) (service )
- Capacity: 800 to 900 passengers

General characteristics (as U.S. Navy vessel)
- Type: Sidewheel gunboat
- Displacement: 950 long tons (965 t)
- Length: 221 ft (67.4 m)
- Beam: 26 ft 3 in (8.00 m)
- Depth of hold: 13 ft 6 in (4.11 m)
- Propulsion: Side-lever steam engine, two sidewheel paddles
- Speed: 15 kn (17 mph; 28 km/h)
- Complement: 96 officers and men
- Armament: 1 × 30-pounder Parrott rifle; 2 × 12-pounder rifles; 4 × 24-pounder howitzers

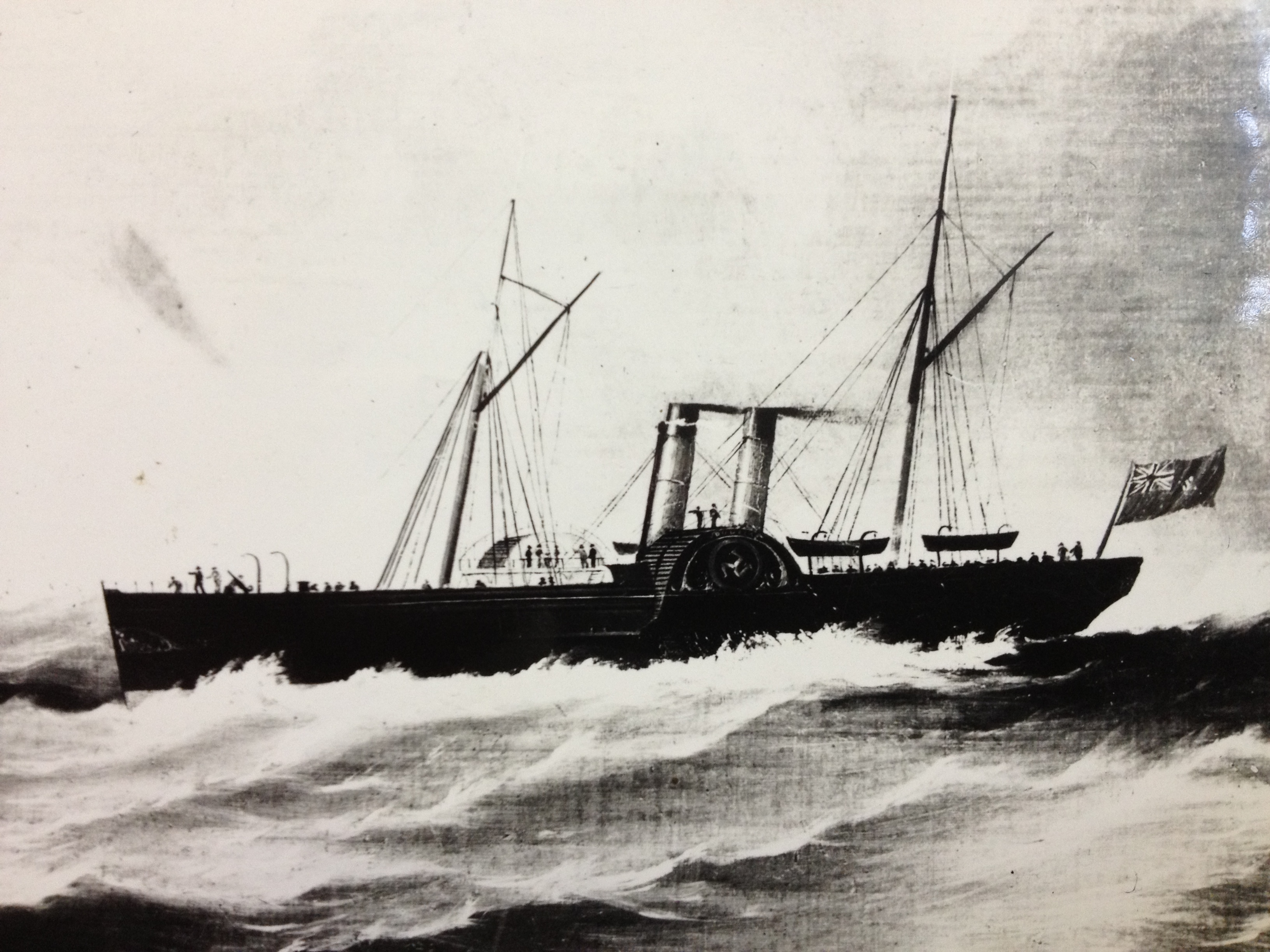
RMS Douglas.

The first USS Gettysburg was a steamer in the United States Navy. The ship was built in Glasgow, Scotland, in 1858, named RMS Douglas, and operated by the Isle of Man Steam Packet Company in the United Kingdom between Liverpool, England, and Douglas on the Isle of Man until November 1862. She was then sold to Cunard, Wilson & Company on behalf of the Confederate agents Fraser, Trenholm & Company for use by the Confederate States of America during the American Civil War. Renamed Margaret and Jessie, she operated as a blockade runner until her capture by the Union on 5 November 1863. The ship then was commissioned into the Union Navy on 2 May 1864 as USS Gettysburg.

During her U.S. Navy service, Gettysburg operated with the North Atlantic Blockading Squadron, was involved in both the first and second attacks on Fort Fisher, helped lay telegraph cables between Key West, Florida, and Havana, Cuba, and undertook navigational surveys of the Caribbean Sea, the Atlantic Ocean, and the Mediterranean Sea. Gettysburg was decommissioned on 6 May 1879 and sold two days later.

== Isle of Man Steam Packet Company, 1858–1862 ==
=== Construction ===
Due to a steady increase in passenger traffic between the Isle of Man and England, the Isle of Man Steam Packet Company decided in 1858 to order a larger, faster ship for its packet fleet. The ship, PS Douglas, No. 20683, the first ship in the company's history to be so named and the ninth ship the company ordered, was an iron-hulled paddle steamer. She was built by Robert Napier and Sons in Glasgow, Scotland, in 1858. Robert Napier and Sons also supplied her steam engine and boilers. Her purchase cost was £17,500, plus an allowance from John Napier and Sons of £5,000 for the paddle steamer King Orry of 1842.

Douglas was launched at 13:30 hours on Wednesday, 28 April 1858, the christening of the ship being performed by the wife of John Napier. Also in attendance on behalf of the Isle of Man Steam Packet Company was Captain Edward Quayle, the commodore of the company.

Douglas′s launch had been delayed for a short period as the berth where her fitting-out was to take place was occupied by another vessel. Following her launch she was towed to Launcefield Dock in order to receive her engines.

During sea trials, Douglas achieved 17.75 kn (20.43 mph; 32.87 km/h) and was declared the fastest channel steamer in existence at the time. Her service speed was 17 knots (31 km/h; 20 mph).

=== Appearance and furnishings ===
Designed to carry a mixture of passengers and cargo, Douglas was the first steam packet with a straight stern, no fiddle bow, and no figurehead. Her gross tonnage was 700 GRT, her length 205 feet (62.5 m), her beam 26 feet (7.9 m), and her depth 14 feet (4.3 m). Certified by the Board of Trade to carry between 800 and 900 passengers, she was longer and faster than her forerunners.

Douglas was considered an elegant ship. She had a raised quarterdeck, below which was situated a spacious and beautifully fitted up saloon, ladies cabin, and sleeping cabins, with accommodation for 100 first class passengers. These cabins ran the full length of the quarterdeck and were lit by large, wide skylights, two large deck windows, and sixteen side windows. The chief saloon was well decorated with three large marble tables with mahogany tops, the seats for which had a movable back to allow the occupier to sit either facing toward or away from the table. On the wall at the aft end of the saloon were hung two pictures, one of Douglas Harbour and the other of Liverpool. The saloon could accommodate 70 people for dining at any given time.

Steerage passengers were accommodated in the forward part of the ship, and as was the case with first class, a ladies lounge was provided. The crew's quarters were situated beyond this, in the immediate vicinity of the forecastle.

Douglas′s deck was described as clear and roomy, with a hurricane deck situated between the paddle boxes which was 50 feet (15.2 m) long and roofed over on all sides. She was fitted with a full complement of lifeboats, these being fitted with Clifford's patent lowering apparatus, which enabled the boats to be lowered safely whilst the vessel was under steam.

=== Mail, cargo, and machinery ===
Douglas′s designation as a Royal Mail Ship (RMS) indicated that she carried mail under contract with the Royal Mail. A specified area was allocated for the storage of letters, parcels, and specie (i.e., bullion, coins and other valuables). This was situated in the forecastle beneath the crew's quarters and was accessible only to a designated ship's officer.

Douglas′s cargo hold was below the main saloon and first class ladies cabin in one of the watertight compartments, giving Douglas space for a considerable quantity of regular cargo, ranging from furniture to foodstuffs.

Douglas′s cargo hold also contained two fresh water storage tanks, each capable of accommodating 500 imperial gallons (2,273 L; 600 US gal) of water. Aft of the cargo hold were the fuel bunkers, furnaces, and steam engine.

=== Maiden voyage ===
Douglas made her maiden voyage from Glasgow to Douglas, Isle of Man, on Saturday, 3 July 1858. Having made passage from the River Clyde in a time of 8 hours 30 minutes, her arrival off Onchan Head was heralded by cannon fire from the Conister Rock, Fort Anne, and the Castle Mona. As she entered Douglas Bay she stopped and embarked several directors of the Isle of Man Steam Packet Company before steaming across the bay several times among a large number of small boats which had put to sea for the occasion. A large crowd had gathered on the Red Pier in order to welcome her and after she had secured alongside many of these people were able to view the interior of the ship, with further public viewings made available over the following two days.

Douglas was claimed to be the fastest steamer then afloat. She attracted wide attention, and her speed made her a strong candidate for more advanced adventures and was acclaimed as "comme le premier" among cross-channel steamers.

=== Service life ===
Under the command of Captain Quayle, Douglas made her inaugural crossing from Douglas to Liverpool on Tuesday, 6 July 1858. She achieved over 17 knots (31 km/h; 20 mph) on the trip and immediately broke the record for the crossing time between Douglas and Liverpool, achieving a time of 4 hours 20 minutes.This broke the previous record of 4 hours 50 minutes set in September 1856 by SS Mona's Queen . On her return run to the Isle of Man, Douglas would routinely record a passage time of 4 hours 40 minutes. Ancillary work consisted of charter sailings and day excursions, one of which was on 14 October 1859, when Douglas made an excursion to Holyhead, Wales, to see the ocean liner SS Great Eastern. On another occasion, she was chartered to Henderson's of Belfast, Ireland, for three weeks for the then-notable fee of £200 per week.

While in the Isle of Man Steam Packet Company's colours, the only events of interest – apart from the way she broke the record for the home run – were two mishaps that occurred during her voyages. One was her collision with the brig Dido, which cost the company £400 in damages. Another was an accident which befell a passenger on Monday, 16 April 1860, whilst she was making passage to Liverpool. The passenger, a sailor from the second rate ship-of-the-line HMS Majestic who had been home on leave from the Royal Navy, scaled his way up the foremast head whilst in a state of alcohol intoxication and got onto the forestay. In his attempt to come back down he fell some 30 feet (9.1 m) to the deck. He subsequently was treated by a doctor who happened to be on board, and on arrival in Liverpool was transferred to the Northern Hospital.

== Confederate States of America, 1862–1863 ==
Thanks to her high speed, Douglas was an ideal blockade runner for the Confederate States of America to use to avoid the Union blockade during the American Civil War. After only four years under Isle of Man Steam Packet Company ownership, Douglas was sold to Cunard, Wilson and Company — who were clandestinely acting as brokers for the Confederate agents Fraser, Trenholm and Company — for £24,000 in 1862. Douglas departed her home port of Douglas for the last time on Sunday, 16 November 1862, and proceeded to Liverpool.

Whilst in Liverpool Douglas was painted light grey and loaded with cargo. She departed for Nassau in the Bahamas under the command of Captain Corbett on Tuesday, 2 December 1862, and arrived at Nassau in late January 1863. By then she was under the ownership of the Charleston Import and Export Company. She successfully ran the blockade and reached Charleston, South Carolina, on 31 January 1863, bringing in much-needed supplies. She then departed for Nassau with a cargo of cotton. She subsequently was renamed Margaret and Jessie in honor of the daughters of her new owner, both of whom were on board her during her initial outbound blockade run from Charleston.

Margaret and Jessie ran the blockade successfully on numerous other occasions. On 1 June 1863 off Nassau, however, Margaret and Jessie was fired upon and driven ashore by a United States Navy gunboat. Some records erroneously maintain that after she was driven ashore and had escaped to Nassau, she took no further part in the American Civil War, and that her engines could be seen rusting on the beach at Nassau as late as 1926. In reality, although damaged, she went back to blockade running a few days after her encounter with the gunboat.

On 5 November 1863, Margaret and Jessie′s blockade-running career came to an end when the United States Army transport Fulton and the U.S. Navy armed sidewheel paddle steamers USS Keystone State and USS Nansemond captured her off Wilmington, North Carolina, and took her as a prize.

== U.S. Navy, 1864–1879 ==
=== Acquisition, refit, and commissioning ===
The U.S. Navy purchased Margaret and Jessie from the New York Prize Court for American Civil War service. She underwent a refit, emerging from it lengthened by 16 feet (4.9 m) to 221 feet (67.4 m), armed with a 30-pounder Parrott rifle, two 12-pounder rifles, and four 24-pounder howitzers, and with a displacement of 950 tons. She was commissioned into U.S. Navy service as USS Gettysburg at the New York Navy Yard in Brooklyn, New York, on 2 May 1864 with Lieutenant Roswell Lamson commanding. When commissioned, she had a ship's company of 96.

=== American Civil War service ===
==== North Atlantic Blockading Squadron ====
A fast, strong steamer, Gettysburg was assigned to blockade duty with the North Atlantic Blockading Squadron. She departed New York City on 7 May 1864 and arrived at Beaufort, North Carolina, on 14 May 1864. From there she took station at the entrance to the Cape Fear River. For the next seven months, she was engaged in capturing Confederate blockade runners. She captured several ships. She occasionally performed other duties, such as on 8 October 1864, when she rescued six survivors from the schooner Home, which had capsized in a squall.

==== Battles of Fort Fisher ====
Gettysburg took part in the First Battle of Fort Fisher on 24–25 December 1864. Gettysburg assisted with a devastating bombardment of Fort Fisher prior to amphibious landings by Union Army troops. During the actual landings, she stood in close to shore to furnish cover for the assault. Gettysburg's boats helped transport troops to the beaches.

With the failure of the first attack on the Confederate works, plans were laid for another assault, this time including a landing force of U.S. Navy sailors and United States Marines, to assault the sea face of the fort. In the Second Battle of Fort Fisher on 15 January 1865, Gettysburg again engaged the fort in the preliminary bombardment, and furnished a detachment of sailors under the command of Lieutenant Lamson and other officers in an assault, which was stopped under the ramparts of Fort Fisher. Lamson and a group of officers and men were forced to spend the night in a ditch under Confederate guns before they could escape. Though failing to take the sea face of Fort Fisher, the attack by the Navy and Marine Corps diverted enough of the defenders to make the Army assault successful. Gettysburg suffered two men killed and six wounded in the assault.

==== Later war service ====
Gettysburg spent the remaining months of the war on blockade duty off Wilmington, North Carolina. The war ended in April 1865, and Gettysburg operated from April to June 1865 between Boston, Massachusetts, and Norfolk, Virginia, carrying freight and passengers. She was decommissioned on 23 June 1865 at the New York Navy Yard in Brooklyn.

=== Post-war ===
==== Caribbean, 1866–1875 ====
Recommissioning on 3 December 1866, Gettysburg made a cruise to the Caribbean Sea, concluding it with her arrival at Washington, D.C., on 18 February 1867. She decommissioned again on 1 March 1867.

Gettysburg went back into commission on 3 March 1868 at Norfolk and put to sea on 28 March 1868 on special service in the Caribbean. Until July 1868, she visited various ports in the area to protect American interests, among them Kingston, Jamaica, Havana, Cuba, and ports in Haiti. From 3 July to 13 August 1868, Gettysburg assisted in the laying of a telegraph cable from Key West, Florida, to Havana, and joined with scientists from the United States Hydrographic Office in a cruise to determine the longitudes of West Indian points using the electric telegraph. From 13 August 1868 to 1 October 1869, she cruised between various Haitian ports and Key West. She arrived at the New York Navy Yard in Brooklyn on 8 October 1869, decommissioned the same day, and entered the navy yard for repairs.

Gettysburg was laid up in ordinary until 6 November 1873, when she again commissioned at the Washington Navy Yard in Washington, D.C. She spent several months transporting men and supplies to the various navy yards on the United States East Coast, and on 25 February 1874 anchored in the harbor at Pensacola, Florida, to embark members of the survey team seeking routes for an inter-oceanic canal in Nicaragua. Gettysburg transported the engineers to Aspinwall, Panama (then a part of Colombia), and Greytown, Nicaragua, and returned them to Norfolk on 10 May 1874. After several more trips along the U.S. East Coast with passengers and supplies, the ship again decommissioned on 9 April 1875 at the Washington Navy Yard.

Recommissioned on 21 September 1875, Gettysburg departed Washington for Norfolk, where she arrived on 14 October 1875 and was assigned to assist in another of the U.S. Hydrographic Office expeditions to improve the safety of navigation. Sources differ on her activities during her subsequent expedition. According to various sources, she made a voyage to the eastern Atlantic Ocean, where her embarked Hydrographic Office team made use of the Thomson Sounding Machine to discover the Gorringe Ridge, a seamount about 130 miles (110 nmi; 210 km) west of Portugal along the Azores–Gibraltar Transform Fault, on 6 November 1875; they named it "Gorringe Bank" after Gettysburg′s commanding officer, Captain Henry Honychurch Gorringe, and spent time mapping it, determined that it contained two significant peaks, which they named Gettysburg — the highest, at depth of 20 meters (66 ft) — after the ship, and Ormonde, the second highest, at a depth of 33 meters (108 ft). The Dictionary of American Naval Fighting Ships, however, claims that Gettysburg did not depart Norfolk until 7 November 1875 and spent her cruise in the Caribbean, where she conducted hydrographic surveys in the West Indies that supported the creation of precise nautical charts. She concluded her cruise with her arrival at Washington, D.C., on 14 June 1876, decommissioning on 26 June 1876.

==== Mediterranean, 1876–1879 ====
Gettysburg recommissioned on 20 September 1876, for special duty in the Mediterranean, where she was to obtain navigational information about the coasts and islands of the Mediterranean Sea. Gettysburg departed Norfolk on 17 October 1876 for Europe. During the next two years, she visited nearly every port in the Mediterranean, taking depth soundings and making observations on the southern coast of France, the entire coastline of Italy, and the Adriatic islands. Gettysburg continued to the coast of the Ottoman Empire in Anatolia, and from there made soundings on the coast of Egypt and other North African points, Sicily, and Sardinia. On 1 October 1878, while the ship was off the coast of Algeria, Landsman Walter Elmore rescued a fellow sailor from drowning, for which he was awarded the Medal of Honor. While visiting Genoa on 22 April 1879, Gettysburg rescued the crew of a small vessel which had run upon the rocks outside the breakwater.

=== Decommissioning and disposal ===
Her iron plates corroded from years of almost uninterrupted service and her machinery weakened, Gettysburg was decommissioned on 6 May 1879. She was sold at Genoa, Italy, on 8 May 1879.

== Bibliography ==
- Musgrove, R. E. (1999). "Question 20/98: Fate of USS Gettysburg". Warship International. XXXVI (2): 199. ISSN 0043-0374.
- Lamson of the Gettysburg: The Civil War Letters of Lieutenant Roswell H. Lamson, U.S. Navy, James M. and Patricia R. McPherson, eds. (Oxford Univ. Press 1999)
- Chappell, Connery (1980). Island Lifeline T.Stephenson & Sons Ltd ISBN 0-901314-20-X
