= Walter Elmore =

- Born: 1857; England
- Died: Unknown
- Military career
- Allegiance: United States of America
- Branch: United States Navy
- Rank: Landsman
- Unit: USS Gettysburg
- Awards: Medal of Honor

Walter Elmore (born 1857, date of death unknown) was a United States Navy sailor and a recipient of the United States military's highest decoration, the Medal of Honor.

== Biography ==
Born in 1857 in England, Elmore joined the U.S. Navy from Toulon, France. By October 1, 1878, he was serving as a landsman on the USS Gettysburg. On that day, while Gettysburg was in the Mediterranean Sea off the coast of Algeria (36°58′N 3°44′E), he jumped overboard and saved Landsman Wallace A. Febrey from drowning. For this action, he was awarded the Medal of Honor.

Elmore's official Medal of Honor citation reads:

On board the U.S.S. Gettysburg; for jumping overboard and saving from drowning Wallace Febrey, landsman, while that vessel was under way at sea in latitude 36 degrees 58 minutes north, longitude 3 degrees 44 minutes east, 1 October 1878.

== See also ==
- List of Medal of Honor recipients during peacetime
