= Henry Honychurch Gorringe =

United States naval officer (1841–1885)

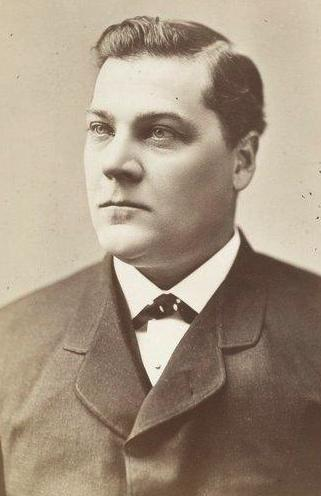
- Henry Honychurch Gorringe, 1883
- Born: August 11, 1841; Barbados
- Died: July 7, 1885 (aged 43); New York City
- Burial place: Rockland Cemetery, Sparkill, New York
- Military career
- Allegiance: United States of America
- Branch: United States Navy
- Service years: 1862–1883
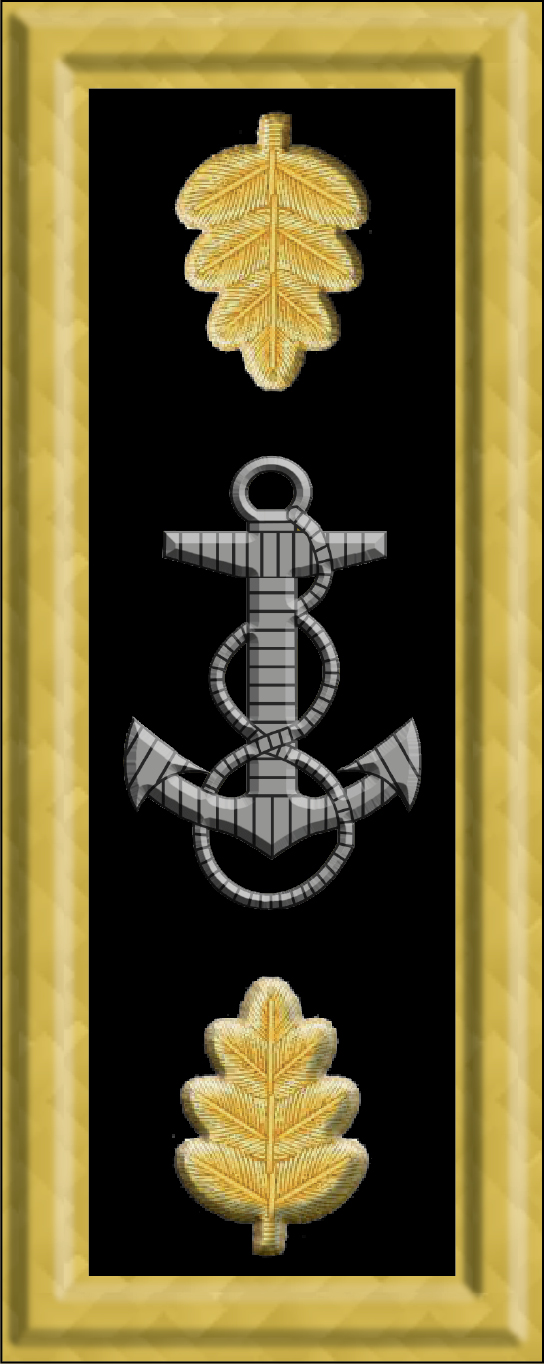
- Rank: Lieutenant commander
- Conflicts: American Civil War

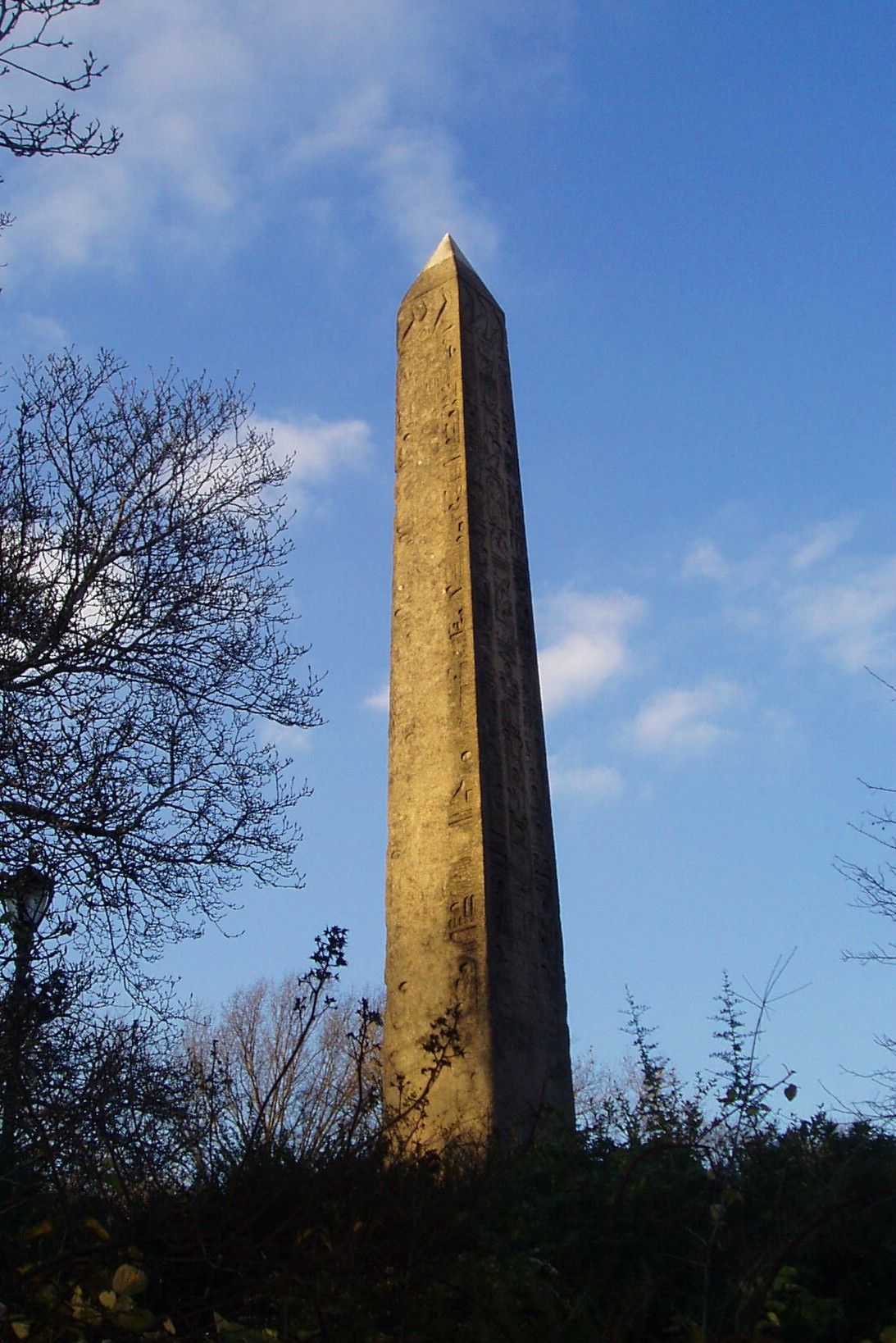
Cleopatra's Needle - Central Park, New York City

Henry Honychurch Gorringe (August 11, 1841 – July 7, 1885) was a United States naval officer who attained national acclaim for successfully completing the removal of Cleopatra's Needle from Alexandria, Egypt to Central Park in New York City.

== Early life ==
Henry Honychurch Gorringe was born in the British colony of Barbados on August 11, 1841. His father served as rector to St. Michael's Cathedral. Young Henry came to the United States at a young age, entering the merchant marine.

During the Civil War, he enlisted in the Union Navy, entering on July 13, 1862, with the rank of Mate, serving in the Mississippi Squadron. He received promotion to Acting Ensign on October 1, 1862, to Acting Master on September 26, 1863, to Acting Volunteer Lieutenant on April 27, 1864, and to Acting Volunteer Lieutenant Commander on July 10, 1865. Gorringe elected to stay in the Navy after the war, receiving a regular commission as a Lieutenant on March 12, 1868, and was promoted to Lieutenant Commander on December 18, 1868.

Gorringe discovered the underwater mountain range now known as the Gorringe Ridge in 1875, while commanding the exploration vessel Gettysburg. That same year he compiled a book on the exploration of the Río de la Plata, published by the U.S. Hydrographic Office. He served in the Mediterranean in 1876–1878.

== Moving Cleopatra's Needle ==
In 1879, Gorringe put in an application for the contract to move the obelisk of Thutmosis III from Alexandria to Central Park. His was the only complete plan, and in August 1879, he was granted the contract, for which he was to be paid $75,000.

Gorringe and his assistant, Seaton Schroeder, left for Europe to purchase materials and then went to Alexandria to move the obelisk. While in Egypt, Gorringe encountered diplomatic obstruction from European countries, technical problems, and obstruction from local authorities. He was able to overcome them all and successfully departed from Alexandria on June 12, 1880. They arrived in Staten Island on July 20, right on schedule.

Gorringe had to commission a special railway to carry the 200 ton obelisk from the shipyards to Central Park. It was finally erected on January 22, 1881. That same year, Gorringe was elected as a member to the American Philosophical Society.

== Later career and death ==
It was Gorringe, who after attending a lecture about "sin in politics" by a very young New York Assemblyman, approached the young politician telling him how much he enjoyed the talk. The young politician also had a very deep interest in Naval History, which also appealed to the young (now former) Naval officer, and the two became fast friends.

The New York Assemblyman told Gorringe how much he wanted to hunt buffalo before they vanished, to which Gorringe invited the young man to join him at his Cantonment out in the Badlands. Gorringe however, backed out at nearly the last minute, but the young assemblyman did go West to the Badlands, arriving in Medora, North Dakota "at 3 a.m. on the morning of September 7, 1883". That young assemblyman-soon-to-be-a-cowboy was none other than Theodore Roosevelt.

Gorringe wrote Egyptian Obelisks, a book about the expedition to retrieve the obelisk and a study of the other standing obelisks in Paris and London. He resigned from the navy on February 21, 1883. He died on July 7, 1885, the result of an accident the previous winter while boarding a moving train (although Scientific American notes the complications were from spinal injuries from jumping off a moving train). His friend erected a miniature copy of Cleopatra's Needle over Gorringe's grave. He is buried in Rockland Cemetery in Sparkill, New York.

== In media ==
- Humorist Arthur Guiterman referenced Gorringe as a rhyme for "orange" in his poetry:

In Sparkill buried lies that man of mark
Who brought the Obelisk to Central Park,
Redoubtable Commander H.H. Gorringe,
Whose name supplies the long-sought rhyme for "orange."

- The novel Prophet of the Sun, by Russell Blanchard Smith, features Gorringe as a major character in a series of dream sequences.

== See also ==
- Orange (word)#Rhyme
