= Hubert Gorringe =

English cricketer

Personal information
- Full name: Hubert Maurice Gorringe
- Born: 30 January 1886; Eastbourne, Sussex, England
- Died: 28 August 1958 (aged 72); Hove, Sussex, England
- Batting: Unknown

Domestic team information
- Years: Team
- 1920: Sussex

Career statistics
Competition	First-class
Matches	2
Runs scored	49
Batting average	16.33
100s/50s	–/–
Top score	29
Balls bowled	–
Wickets	–
Bowling average	–
5 wickets in innings	–
10 wickets in match	–
Best bowling	–
Catches/stumpings	1/–
- Source: Cricinfo, 22 June 2012

Hubert Maurice Gorringe (30 January 1886 – 28 August 1958) was an English cricketer. Gorringe's batting style is unknown. He was born at Eastbourne, Sussex.

Gorringe made two first-class appearances for Sussex in 1920 County Championship. His first match came against Northamptonshire at the County Ground, Northampton, with his second match coming against Lancashire at Old Trafford. In his first match, Northamptonshire won the toss and elected to bat first, making 119 all out. In response in their first-innings, Sussex made 451 all out, with Gorringe scoring 17 runs in the innings before he was dismissed by William Wells. Northamptonshire then made 415 all out in their second-innings, leaving Sussex with a target of 83 for victory. Sussex reached their target with seven wickets to spare, with Gorringe ending the chase not out on 3. In his second match, Sussex batted first and made 102 all out, with Gorringe being dismissed for a duck by Lawrence Cook. Lancashire were then dismissed for 179 in their first-innings, to which Sussex responded in their second-innings by making just 97 all out, with Gorringe top-scoring with 29 before he was dismissed by Dick Tyldesley. Lancashire won the match by 10 wickets.

He died at Hove, Sussex, on 28 August 1958.
