= SS King Orry (1842) =

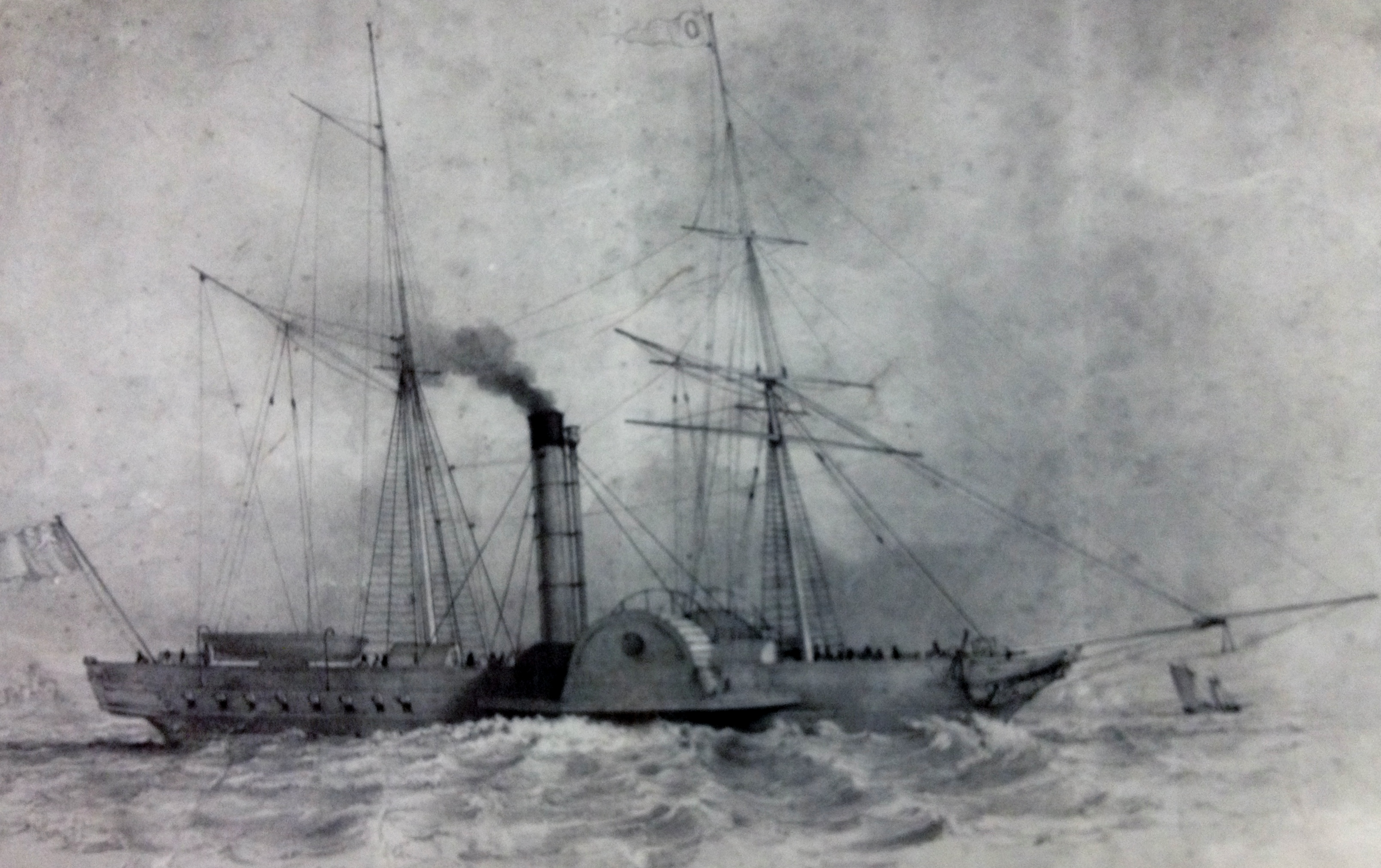
- RMS King Orry

History

Isle of Man
- Name: King Orry
- Owner: 1842–1858: IOMSPCo
- Operator: 1842–1858: IOMSPCo
- Port of registry: Douglas, Isle of Man
- Builder: J. Winram and Robert Napier & Co.
- Cost: £10,763
- Launched: 10 February 1842
- In service: 1842
- Out of service: 1858
- Identification: Official Number 21923; Code Letters N J H M
- Fate: Sold to Robert Napier & Co. as part payment for Douglas. Sold by Napier to Greek interests

General characteristics
- Type: Paddle Steamer
- Tonnage: 433 gross register tons (GRT)
- Length: 140 ft 0 in (42.7 m)
- Beam: 23 ft 3 in (7.1 m)
- Depth: 14 ft 3 in (4.3 m)
- Installed power: 108 shp (81 kW)
- Propulsion: Side Lever engine.
- Speed: 9.5 knots (17.6 km/h; 10.9 mph)

SS (RMS) King Orry (I) No. 21923 - the first vessel in the line's history to be so named - was a wooden paddle-steamer which served with the Isle of Man Steam Packet Company.

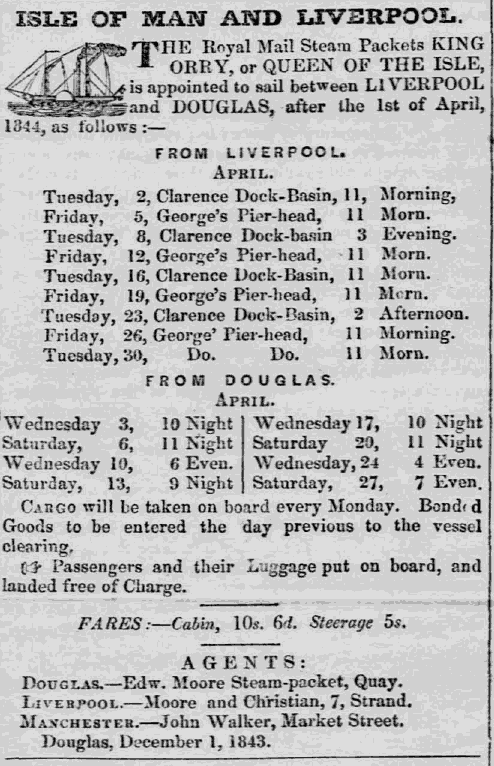
Advertisement of passage between Douglas and Liverpool on board the King Orry and Queen of the Isle.

King Orry is of special interest, as she was the only ship in the Company's history to be built in Douglas. Although the John Winram yard gets the credit for her construction, it is probable that the building was supervised by Aitken of Liverpool, and the Douglas yard merely carried out the construction. Later in 1842, she was taken under tow by Mona's Isle to Glasgow, for her engines to be fitted by Robert Napier & Co.

== Dimensions ==
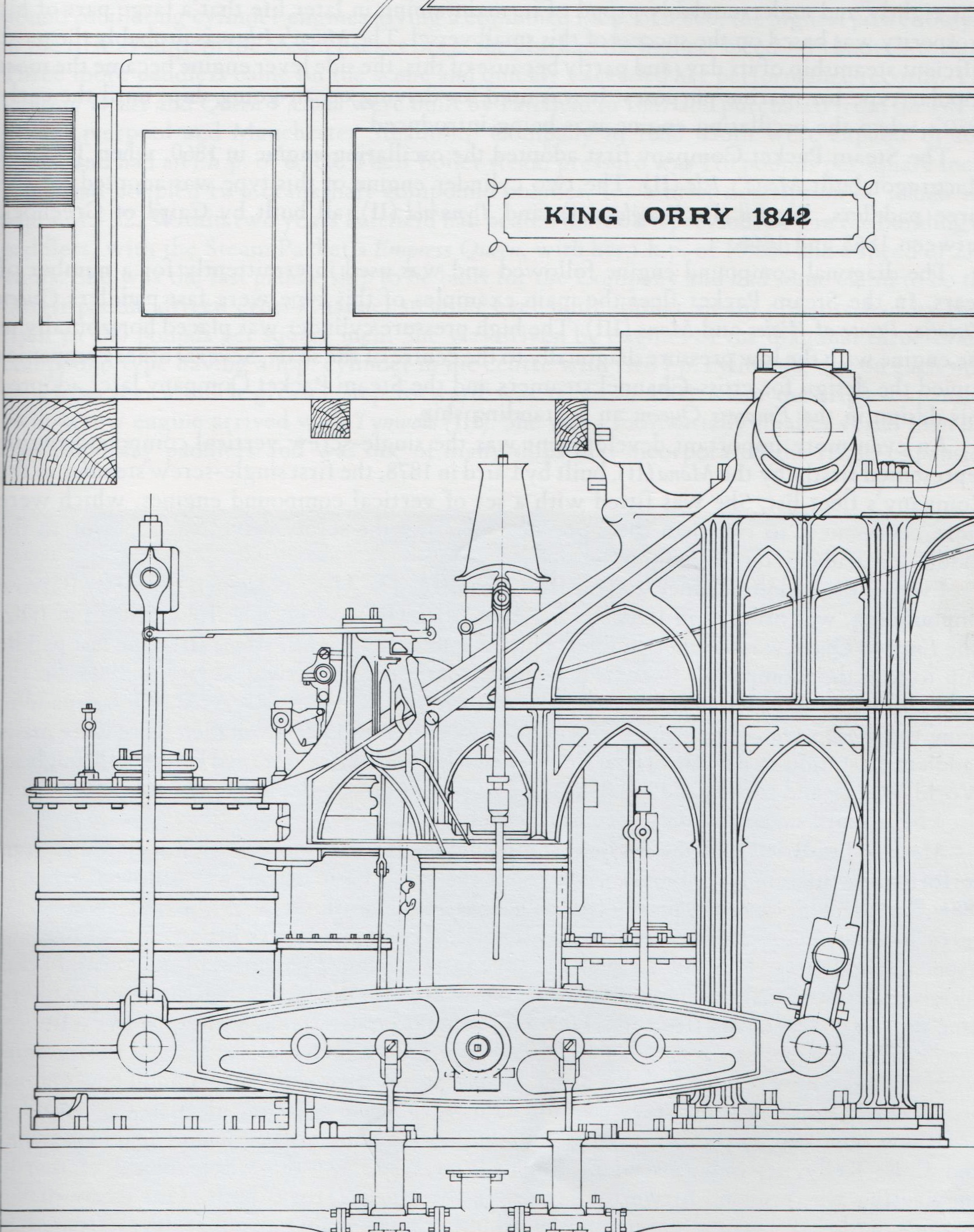
Pictorial diagram of the Beam Engine installed in King Orry.

King Orry was the last wooden built vessel in the Steam Packet fleet. Carvel built with a standing bowsprit, square sterned with sham galleries. King Orry had two masts, was schooner rigged with a male figurehead. She had a registered tonnage of 433 GRT; length 140'; beam 23'3"; depth 14'3". Her engine developed a nominal horse-power of 108 h.p, and this gave her a speed of approximately 9-10 knots. Her purchase cost was £10,763.

== Service life ==
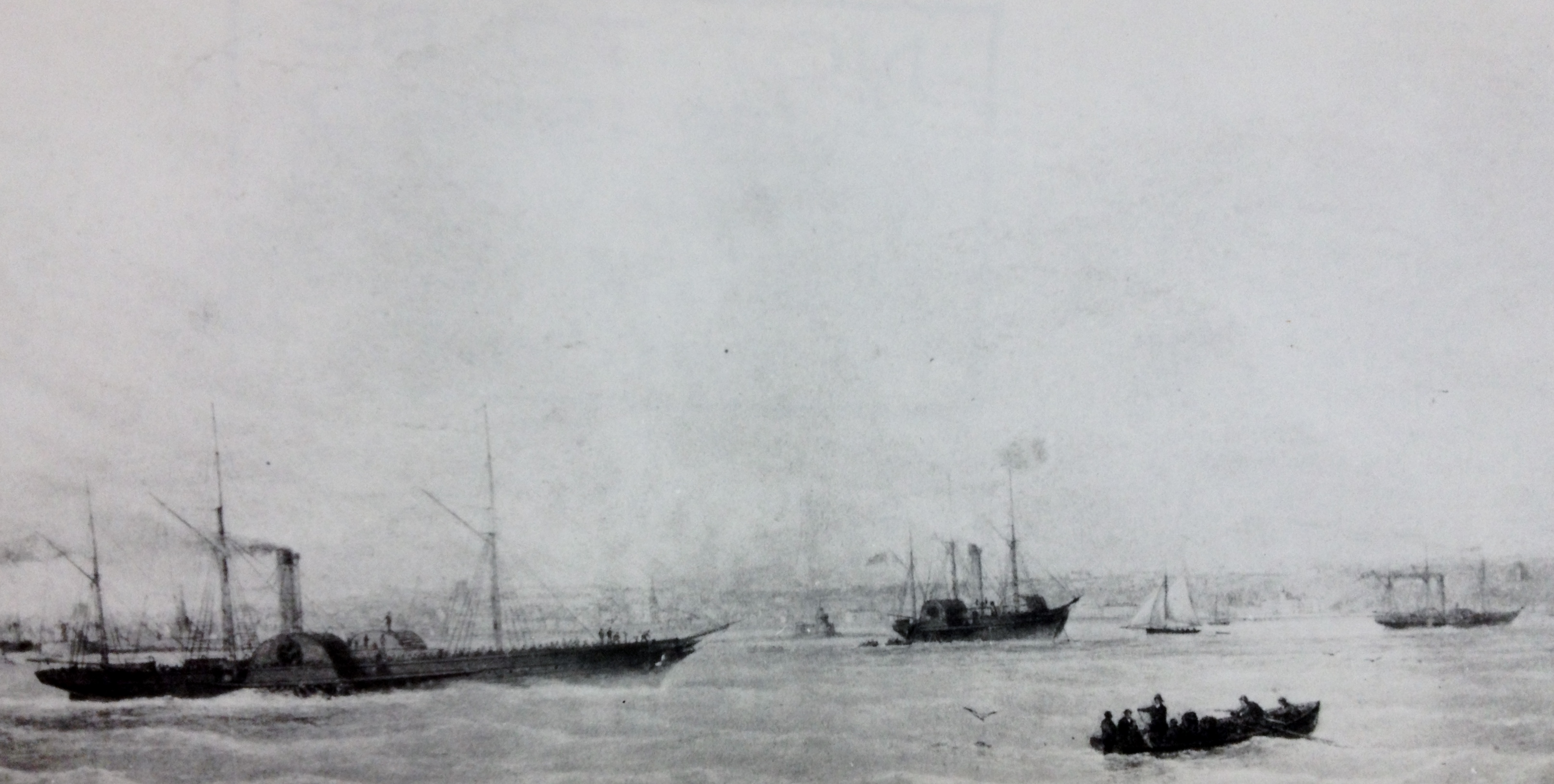
An 1856 image of King Orry, Mona's Queen & Tynwald.

On joining the fleet her fastest run between Douglas and Liverpool was 6hrs 20mins, and her average about 7hrs.

On 20 September 1845, she collided with the steamship Prince in the River Mersey and was beached due to damage sustained to her bows. She was re-boilered in 1847 for £3,000.

On 8 July 1856, the crankpin of her intermediate shaft broke whilst she was on a voyage from Liverpool to Douglas. She was towed back to Liverpool by Tynwald.

== Disposal ==
In 1858, King Orry was taken over by Robert Napier & Co. of Glasgow in part payment for the Douglas. The sum of £5,000 was allowed as her value. She was then sold to the Greeks by Napier and traded in the eastern Mediterranean.
