= SS Mona's Queen (1852) =

19th century paddle-steamer in UK

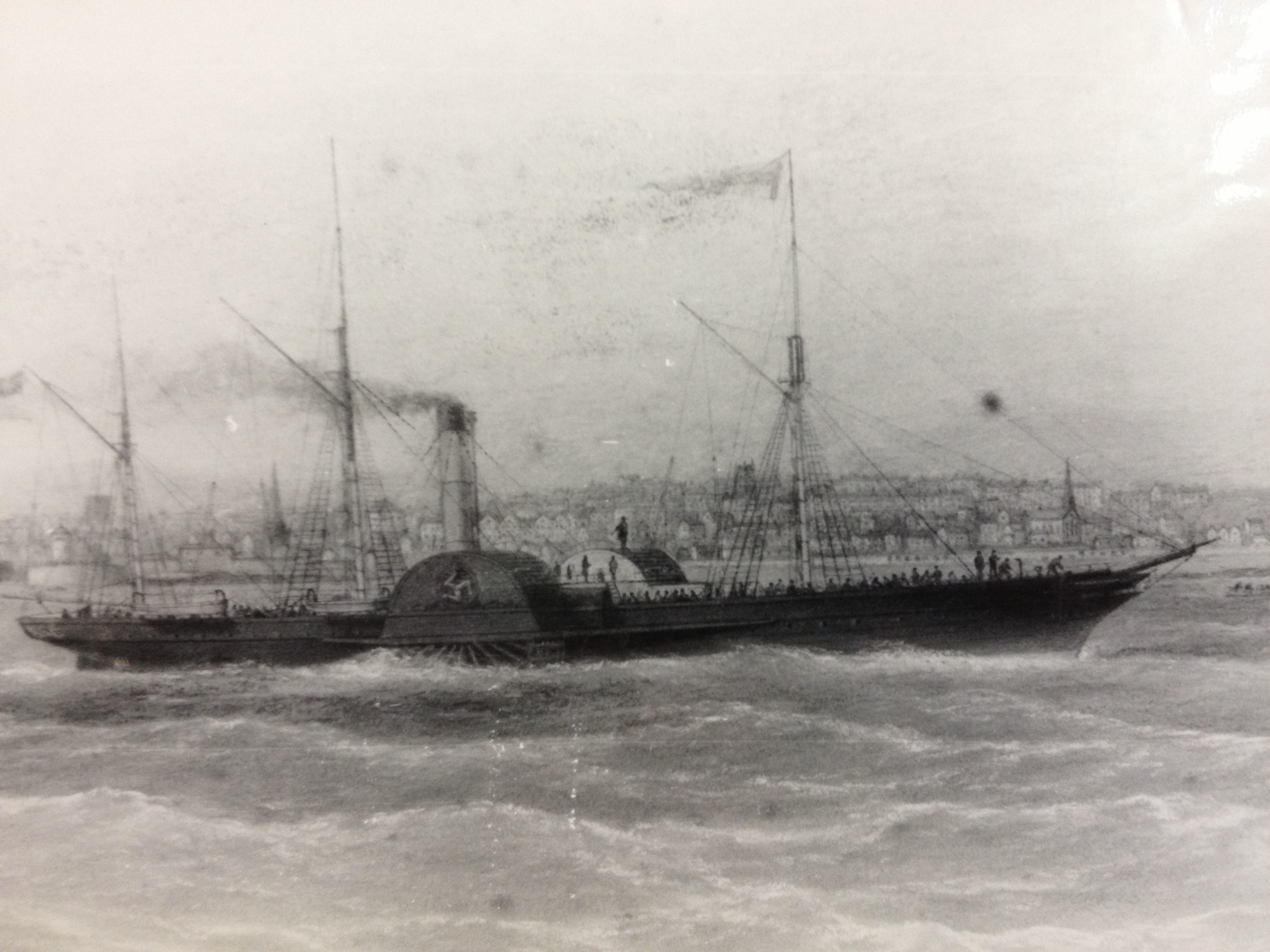
- Mona's Queen.

History
- Name: Mona's Queen
- Owner: 1853–1880: IOMSPCo
- Operator: 1853–1880: IOMSPCo
- Port of registry: Douglas, Isle of Man
- Builder: J. and G. Thomson of Clydebank
- Cost: No official record, thought to be in the region of £14,000.
- Yard number: 6
- Laid down: 1852
- Launched: 27 November 1852
- Completed: 1853
- In service: February 1853
- Out of service: 1880
- Identification: Official Number 21930; Code Letters N J H W
- Fate: Scrapped 1880

General characteristics
- Tonnage: 600 GRT
- Length: Initially 170 ft 0 in (51.8 m) lengthened to 186 ft 0 in (56.7 m) following refit.
- Beam: 27 ft 0 in (8.2 m)
- Depth: 13 ft (4.0 m)
- Propulsion: Side Lever Engine
- Speed: 13 knots (24 km/h; 15 mph)

SS (RMS) Mona's Queen (I) No. 21930 – the first vessel in the Company's history to bear the name – was an iron paddle-steamer which was owned and operated by the Isle of Man Steam Packet Company.

== Construction and dimensions ==
Mona's Queen was built and engined by J. & G. Thomson of Govan, Glasgow and launched in 1852. She had a registered tonnage of 600 tons; length 186'; beam 27' and depth 13'. Her speed is recorded as 13 knots (24 km/h; 15 mph), and her horsepower is not recorded.

Mona's Queen carried a figurehead of Queen Victoria, and was the first vessel to break away from the Company's long association with Robert Napier & Co. The vessel's cost is not recorded, but a reference in the Company's old minute book suggests it was under £14,000. In 1855 she was lengthened (details not recorded) at a cost of £2,111.

== Service life ==
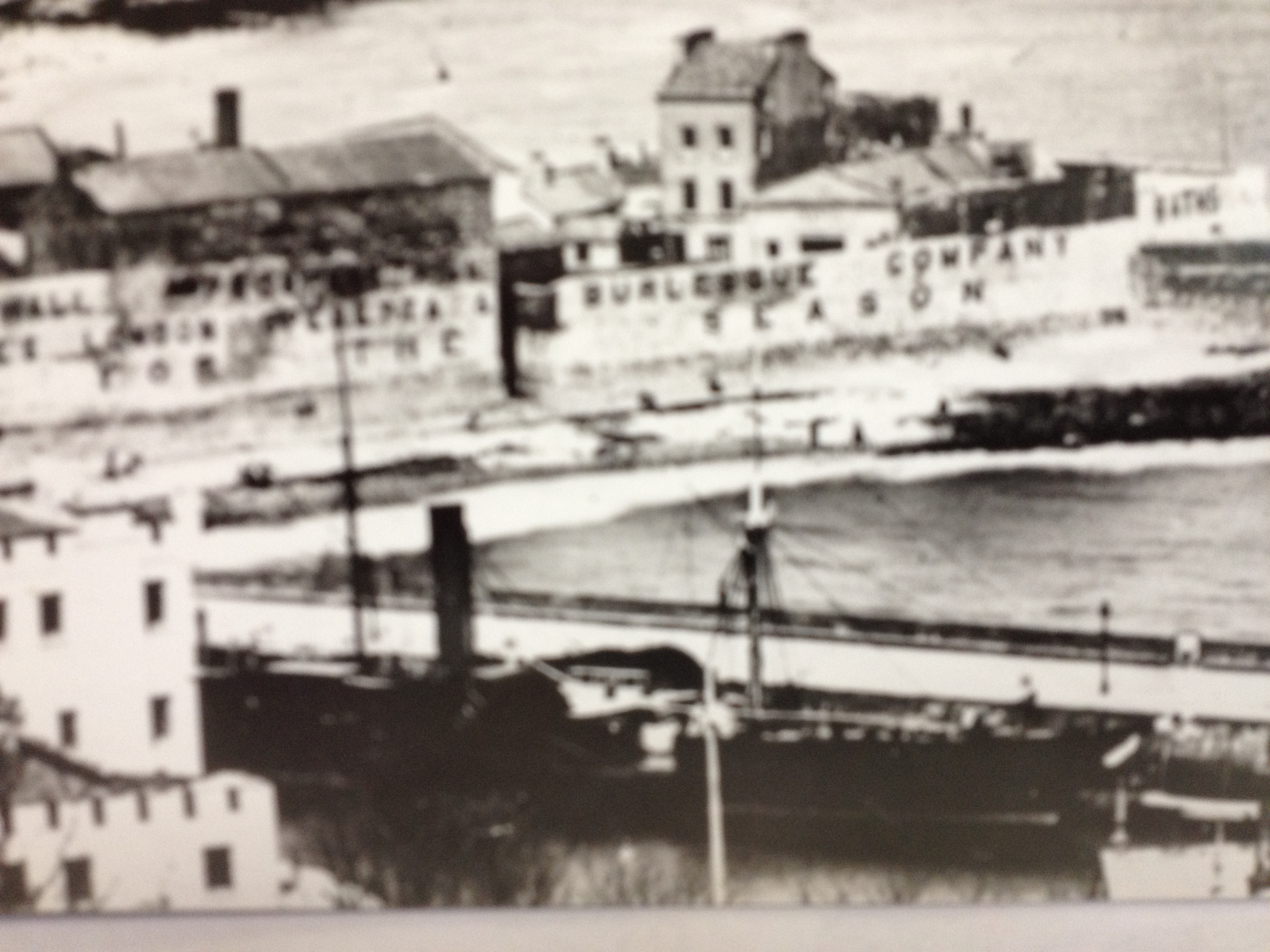
An early photograph of Mona's Queen, alongside the Red Pier, Douglas.

Mona's Queen appears to have had a pretty uneventful career, with the exception of a collision with the steamer Sligo, which occurred in the River Mersey in January 1862. The official inquiry went against the Steam Packet Company who had to pay approximately £300 in damages and costs. The Captain was accordingly reduced from Second Class Master to Third, and his pay was cut from £275 to £250.

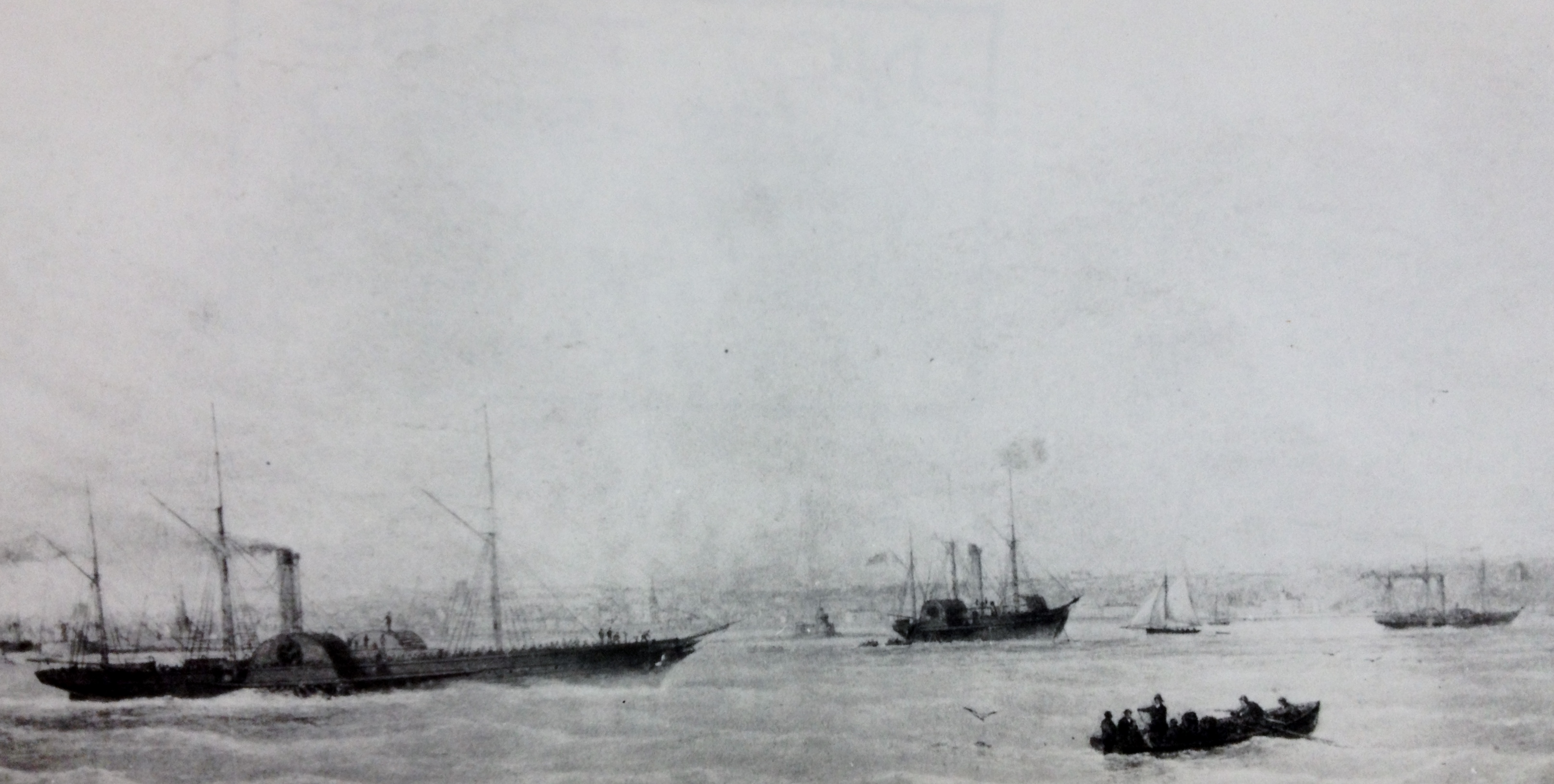
An 1856 image of King Orry, Mona's Queen & Tynwald.

== Disposal ==
After ten years service the directors decided to sell the ship and offered it to Cunard, Wilson and Co. for £20,000.

The offer was declined, and negotiations started with a Whitehaven company for a sale at £14,000.

Midway through 1864 the directors admitted they could not sell the vessel. Mona's Queen therefore continued in the Company's service until she was broken up in 1880.
