= Allan Gorringe =

English cricketer (1884–1918)

Personal information
- Full name: Allan Lindsay Gorringe
- Born: 20 January 1884; Eastbourne, Sussex, England
- Died: 22 November 1918 (aged 34); Repton, Derbyshire, England
- Batting: Unknown

Domestic team information
- Years: Team
- 1914: Cambridgeshire
- 1905: Sussex

Career statistics
Competition	First-class
Matches	4
Runs scored	46
Batting average	7.66
100s/50s	–/–
Top score	16
Balls bowled	–
Wickets	–
Bowling average	–
5 wickets in innings	–
10 wickets in match	–
Best bowling	–
Catches/stumpings	–/–
- Source: Cricinfo, 26 January 2012

Allan Lindsay Gorringe (20 January 1884 – 22 November 1918) was an English cricketer. Gorringe's batting style is unknown. He was born at Eastbourne, Sussex.

Gorringe made his first-class debut for Sussex against Middlesex. He made three further first-class appearances for Sussex in 1905, the last of which came against Lancashire. In his four first-class matches, he scored a total of 46 runs at an average of 7.66, with a high score of 16. He later played a single Minor Counties Championship match for Cambridgeshire against Norfolk at Fenner's in 1914.

He died at Repton, Derbyshire on 22 November 1918.
