= United States Hydrographic Office =

Former U.S. government office publishing information used in navigation

- Seal of the USHO

Agency overview
- Formed: June 21, 1866
- Dissolved: July 10, 1962
- Jurisdiction: Department of the Navy

The United States Hydrographic Office (USHO) prepared and published maps, charts, and nautical books required in navigation. The office was established by an act of 21 June 1866 as part of the Bureau of Navigation, Department of the Navy. It was transferred to the Department of Defense on 10 August 1949. The office was abolished on 10 July 1962, replaced by the Naval Oceanographic Office.

== Objectives ==
Before the hydrographic office was established in 1866, U.S. navigators were almost entirely dependent on British charts. A few private enterprises had prepared and published charts, but had not been able to do so profitably. The Hydrographic Office was established "for the improvement of the means for navigating safely the vessels of the Navy and of the mercantile marine, by providing, under the authority of the Secretary of the Navy, accurate and cheap nautical charts, sailing directions, navigators and manuals of instructions for the use of all vessels of the United States, and for the benefit and use of navigators generally".

== History ==
The impetus for establishing the Hydrographical Office came from a petition submitted to Congress in 1863 by the American Shipmasters Association. A Senate committee prepared a report, and a Senate bill was passed on 24 June 1864. The purpose was to empower the Navy Department to give navy and merchant ships the results of surveys and explorations by naval officers in foreign waters. The office was not envisioned as being a rival to the British Admiralty hydrographic office or the French depot of charts, but as an office that could publish charts and directions where there was sufficient information available, priced to cover the cost of paper and printing but not the cost of preparation.

In 1873 the office prepared the instruments needed to determine by using the electric telegraph the longitude of West Indian islands and of points on the northern coast of South America where telegraph cables had been laid. A survey of the Gulf of Mexico had found many errors. Some surveying had been carried out in the Pacific Ocean. In July 1875 the Commodore responsible for the office, describing the work that had been accomplished in the previous year, called for a permanent building with proper fireproofing instead of the temporary rented premises, and asked for funding to conduct a proper survey of the Pacific Ocean, for which the charts were in many areas inadequate. That year a great deal had been achieved in charting the Caribbean. By 1880 the office was divided into the Division of Archives, Chart Division, Meteorological Division, Division of Drafting and Engraving and Division of Longitudes. The office had published about 700 charts of foreign coasts. In 1881 the office employed 22 naval officers and 28 civilians.

An 1889 report described the function of the office as mainly being reconnaissance of foreign coasts, office duties and publication of compiled maps. The United States Coast and Geodetic Survey, a component of the United States Department of the Treasury was responsible for the systematic hydrographic survey of the coasts of the United States. That year the office employed 39 officers and 40 civilians. The office gave out instruments for meteorological observations to the masters of vessels willing to record and report their findings, requiring only that they take reasonable care of the instruments. In 1894 the hydrographic office paid the sum of $20,000 for patents taken out by a former employee for engraving machines, which would greatly reduce the time and cost of engraving soundings, compasses and border shadings. A number of these machines were in use by 1907.

In 1946 the U.S. Navy Hydrographic Office published an ice atlas covering the North American Arctic on a scale of about 1:20,000,000. In 1954 aerial observation of sea ice moved from development into operations, with navy weathermen trained by the Hydrographic Office. Information was transmitted to the Hydrographic office, which prepared forecasts used in planning movement of shipping.

== See also ==
- Naval Oceanographic Office
- Office of Coast Survey
- United States Coast and Geodetic Survey
