= Gorringe Ridge =

Seamount in the Atlantic Ocean on the Azores–Gibraltar fault zone

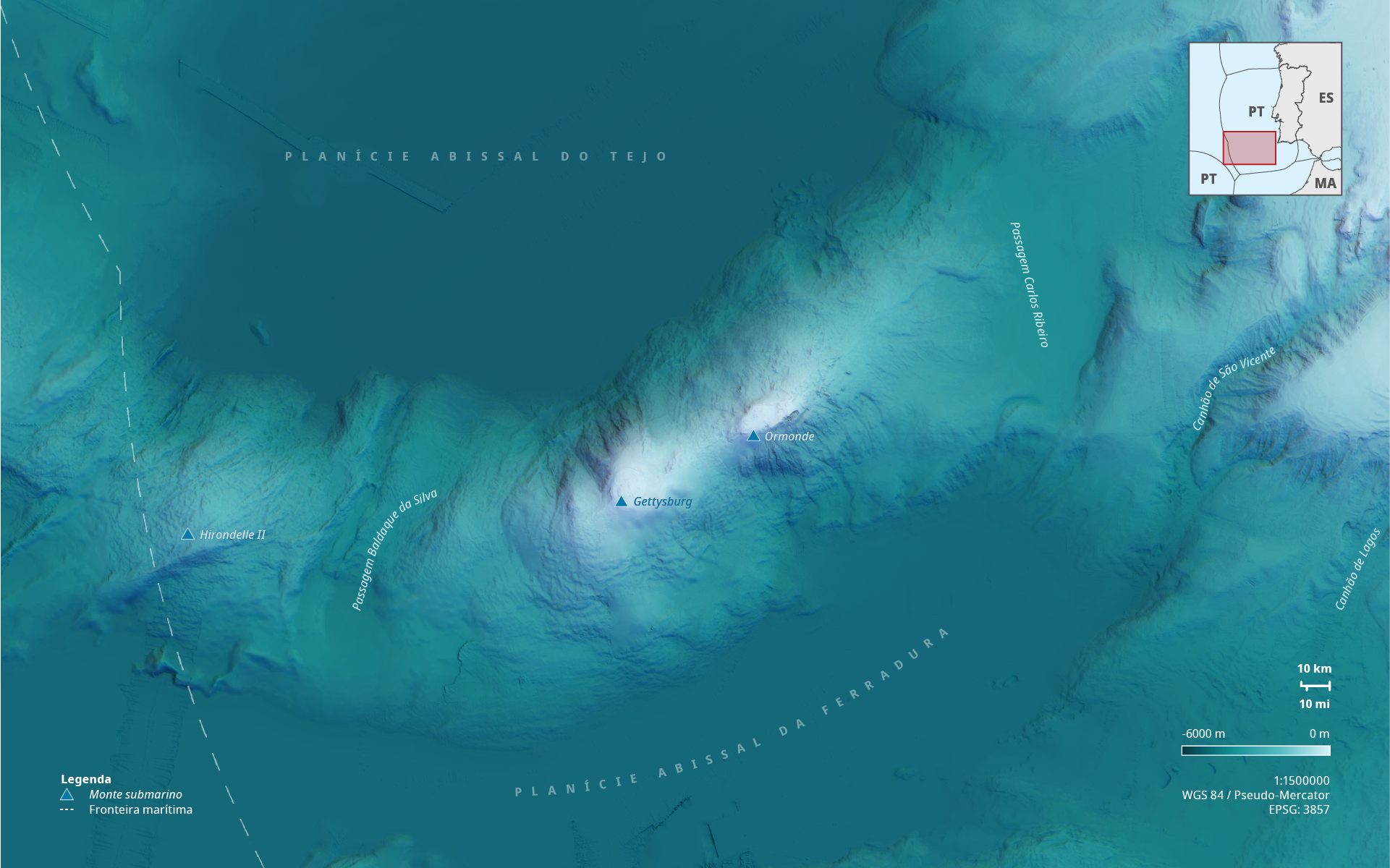
- Summit depth: 25 m (82 ft)
- Summit area: 60 km × 180 km (37 mi × 112 mi)

Location
- Location: Atlantic Ocean
- Coordinates: 36°28′36″N 11°35′1″W

Geology
- Type: Underwater ridge

History
- Discovery date: 6 November 1875
- Discovered by: U.S. Hydrographic Office team aboard USS Gettysburg

The Gorringe Ridge is a seamount in the Atlantic Ocean. It is located about 210 kilometres (110 nmi; 130 mi) west of Portugal, between the Azores and the Strait of Gibraltar along the Azores–Gibraltar fault zone. It is about 60 kilometres (32 nmi; 37 mi) wide and 180 kilometres (97 nmi; 110 mi) long in the northeast direction. It is, since 2015, a marine protected area of Portugal included in the Natura 2000 program. If measured from the bottom of the Tagus Abyssal Plain, the ridge would measure more than 5,000 m (16,400 ft) in height, which would make it Portugal's highest mountain.

== Discovery ==
In the nineteenth century the United States Coast Survey, known from 1878 as the United States Coast and Geodetic Survey, embarked on an ambitious program to map the seafloors of the world's main oceanways. This produced extensive maps of the more shallow areas, but deep-ocean work was hampered by lack of robust equipment. In 1872, English scientist Sir William Thomson invented a wire-based depth-sounding mechanism which was a significant improvement over rope-type equipment used previously. This Thomson Sounding Machine made its first discovery in 1874, of several seamounts in the Pacific Ocean west of the Hawaiian Islands. Its second use was on the USS Gettysburg, an ocean-going United States Navy steamer which in 1875 embarked a United States Hydrographic Office team to extensively map the eastern Atlantic seafloor. The ship was commanded by Captain Henry Honychurch Gorringe. On 6 November 1875 this expedition discovered the raised area (which was referred to as Gorringe Bank in reference to the ship's commanding officer), and spent time mapping it. They determined that it contained two significant peaks, which they named Gettysburg — the highest, at depth of 20 metres (66 ft) — and Ormonde, the second highest, at a depth of 33 metres (108 ft).

== Subsequent explorations ==
In the early twentieth century, Albert I, Prince of Monaco spent considerable time exploring and mapping the Gorringe Bank, using a total of three ships: Princess Alice, Princess Alice II, and Hirondelle II. The ships' names were given to several mounds and large banks between Madeira and the Azores.

The first documented scuba diving expedition, as published in the Mundo Nautico magazine was led by David de Carvalho with three other scuba divers: Miguel Oliveira, Alexandre Ramos, and José Eduardo, and took place in October 1997. The expedition was made possible by support from The Hydrographic Institute, TMN, and Ipimar.

In June 2005, the Oceana Organization mounted an extensive exploration of the biota on Gorringe Ridge's two largest peaks. It aimed to categorize and determine relative abundance of the diverse lifeforms there. Most recently, an expedition was conducted by the Oceano Azul Foundation in September 2024.

== Geology ==
The Gorringe Bank was eventually renamed Gorringe Ridge owing to its extensive length and the determination that it is the result of two tectonic plates which are sliding into and past each other. The plate boundaries here are converging at 4 mm/y, as well as sliding past each other. Upper mantle and oceanic crust are exposed along this ridge. Ferrogabbro dated at 77 Mya has been intruded, Also at 66 Mya the Canary hotspot mantle plume passed by and caused alkaline magma to intrude. Where there is crust, it is very thin, so that the Moho comes up to the sea floor. Sediment overlies the mantle, so this could be considered as crust. Since the Miocene Era there has been shortening of the ocean crust absorbed by folding, and thrusting.

A 2003 study of the ridge's gravity and magnetic anomalies concluded that the Moho is relatively flat across the ridge, and that the ridge's upper part corresponds to a northwestwards vergent fold. The thrusting activity probably started some 20 million years ago, and has covered about 20 kilometres (11 nmi; 12 mi). The seamount is composed of gabbros of the oceanic crust, serpentized rocks and alkaline basalts.

== 1755 Lisbon earthquake ==
Modern seismologists who studied the cause of the 1755 Lisbon earthquake and the resulting tsunami initially suspected a displacement in the Gorringe Ridge, but later concluded that there was a simultaneous event involving two separate faults along the African Plate boundary, both faults displacing by around 20 metres (66 ft).

== Biome ==
The Gorringe Ridge is a particular and unique site for having an enormous diversity of habitats and species - namely corals, such as gorgonians and deep-sea sponges. The peaks are covered by kelp forests. Over 850 species have been registered so far.

Organizations such as Oceana have been trying to include the ridge in the network of protected sites of the Atlantic Ocean since 2005. On 23 July 2015, a Site of Community Importance, spanning 22,927.8 km^{2} (8,852.5 sq mi) was authorized by the Portuguese government making it the first marine protected area included in the Natura 2000 program in the Portuguese EEZ.

Though protected, some areas were affected by human activity, and are littered with lost fishing equipment.

== See also ==
- Geology of the Iberian Peninsula
