= Hammonia =

Female personification of Hamburg

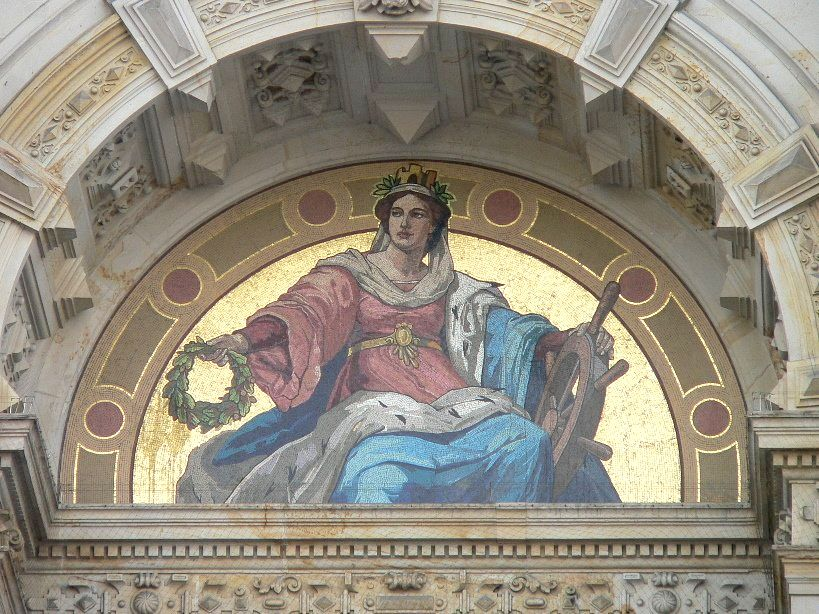
Mosaic of Hammonia over the main entrance of Hamburg Rathaus

Hammonia is the female personification of Hamburg. (Note: The most common Latinizations of Hamburg in documents are the neuter Hamburgum or Hammaburgum.)

The figure of Hammonia as symbol of Hamburg first appears in art and literature in the 18th century. Up until the Protestant Reformation, the city's patroness had been the Virgin Mary.

A tall and beautiful goddess who watches over Hamburg, she is usually shown wearing a crown in the form of a city wall surmounted by towers; she may also hold the city's coat of arms, a ship's anchor, etc. She is said to represent the Hanseatic values of Hamburg: freedom, peace, prosperity, harmony, welfare and trade.

== Hammonia in art ==
=== Hammonia in literature and music ===
Hamburg's Anthem, the Hamburg-Lied or Hamburg-Hymne was written in 1828 by Georg Nikolaus Bärmann. Deutschland: Ein Wintermärchen (Germany: A Winter's Tale) by Heinrich Heine includes her. The goddess is in Heines encounter the fat, tipsy and sentimental daughter of Charlemagne and a "haddock queen". Hammonia also figures large in Wolf Biermann's Deutschland Ein Wintermaerchen.

=== Hammonia in sculpture ===
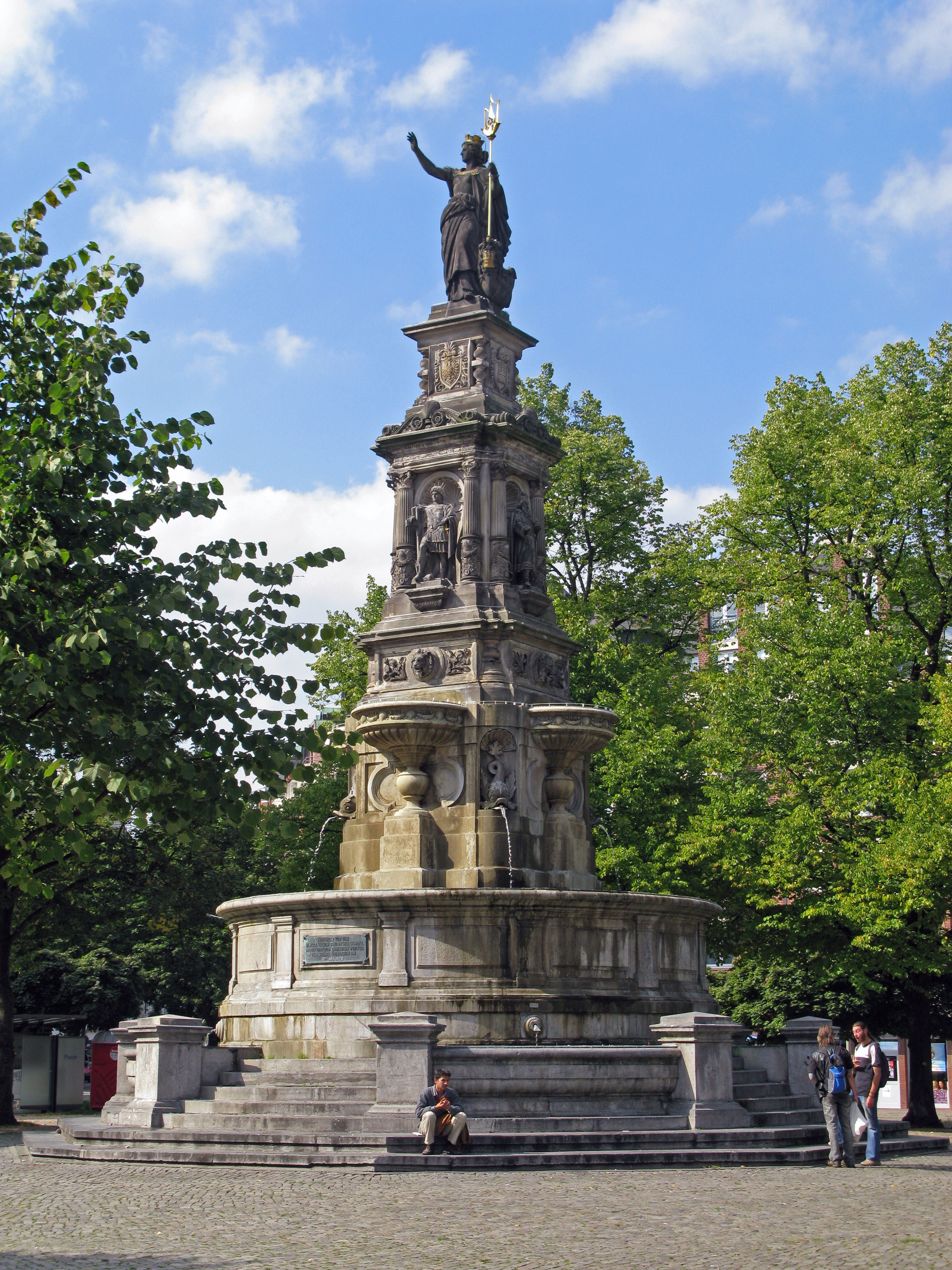
Hansa-Fountain and Hammonia Statue at Hansaplatz in St. Georg

On 10 July 1878 the Hanseatic Building Society unveiled the 17m tall Hansa-Fountain (Hansa-Brunnen) at Hansaplatz in St. Georg as a present to the City of Hamburg. The fountain was designed by architects Heinrich Joseph Kayser and Karl von Großheim, the statue of Hammonia (including minor statues of Archbishop Ansgar, Adolf III of Holstein and Schauenburg, plus the Emperors Constantine and Charlemagne) were created by German sculptor Engelbert Peiffer.

In 1888 a Hammonia statue and that of a young Germania were raised on the Brook's Bridge (Brooksbrücke) to welcome Emperor Wilhelm II as he opened the Hamburg's Free Port. Shortly after the end of World War II, both statues disappeared without a trace. It took almost 60 years for the city to see the return of their patron goddess: since 2003 a new statue of Hammonia has overlooked the port, and this time she is accompanied by Europa. Both sculptures were created in 2003 by German sculptor Jörg Plickat.

== Hammonia class ships ==
Hammonia was also the name of a class of ocean-going vessels owned by the Hamburg-American Line, a predecessor of the modern Hapag-Lloyd. Ships of this class included the SS Germania (I) (1863), the SS Germania (II) (1870), the SS Frisia (1872), the SS Pomerania (1873), the SS Hammonia (I) (1855— the earliest ship of this class and therefore the one that all the subsequent ships are "classed" as), the SS Hammonia (II) (1866), and the SS Silesia, among possibly as many as five or six others built as late as 1965 and one, the most recent vessel, a freighter, still in service. Several of the earlier Hammonia class ships carried trans-atlantic passengers and played a role in German immigration to the United States.

== Hammonia in Brazil ==
Hansa-Hammonia, renamed later to Hammonia, was a district subordinated by the municipality of Blumenau at 1897, was the old name of the current municipality of Ibirama, name given by the Hanseatic Colonization Society, that established in the region, playing a big role in the German colonization of Brazil

== See also ==
- Related to Hamburg:
  - Coat of Arms and Flag of Hamburg
  - List of songs about Hamburg
- Related personifications:
  - Germania, national personification of Germany
  - Deutscher Michel, personification of German people
  - Berolina, personification of Berlin
  - Bavaria, personification of the Land of Bavaria
