= PS Countess of Erne =

History
- Name: 1868–1935: PS Countess of Erne
- Owner: 1868–1889: London and North Western Railway; 1889–1890: Bristol General Steam Navigation Company
- Operator: 1868–1889: London and North Western Railway; 1889–1890: Bristol General Steam Navigation Company
- Port of registry: (United Kingdom)
- Route: 1869–1873: Holyhead – Dublin; 1873–1889: Holyhead – Greenore
- Builder: Walpole, Webb & Bewley, Dublin
- Launched: 1868
- Out of service: 16 September 1935
- Fate: Sank in Portland Harbour

General characteristics
- Tonnage: 830 gross register tons (GRT)
- Length: 241.4 ft (73.6 m)
- Beam: 29 ft (8.8 m)
- Draught: 14.3 ft (4.4 m)

PS Countess of Erne was a paddle steamer passenger vessel operated by the London and North Western Railway from 1868 to 1889.

== History ==
She was built by Walpole, Webb & Bewley, Dublin for the London and North Western Railway in 1868.

Countess of Erne was damaged by fire at Holyhead, Anglesey on 30 January 1875. She was sold to the Bristol General Steam Navigation Company in 1889 and used for a couple of years before being sold for scrap.

She was then used as a coal hulk in various ports. Finally she sank in Portland Harbour on 16 September 1935 and is a popular site with scuba divers for training dives.
