= Armorial of Hamburg =

This is a list of coats of arms of Hamburg, Germany, and its districts and boroughs.

== Boroughs ==
=== Altona ===
Borough of Altona (current)

City of Altona (Until 1937, still sometimes used)

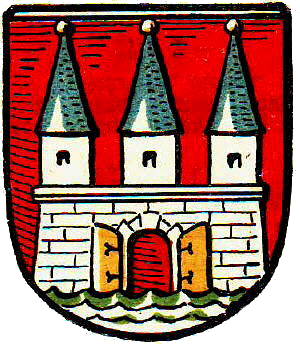
City of Altona (old)

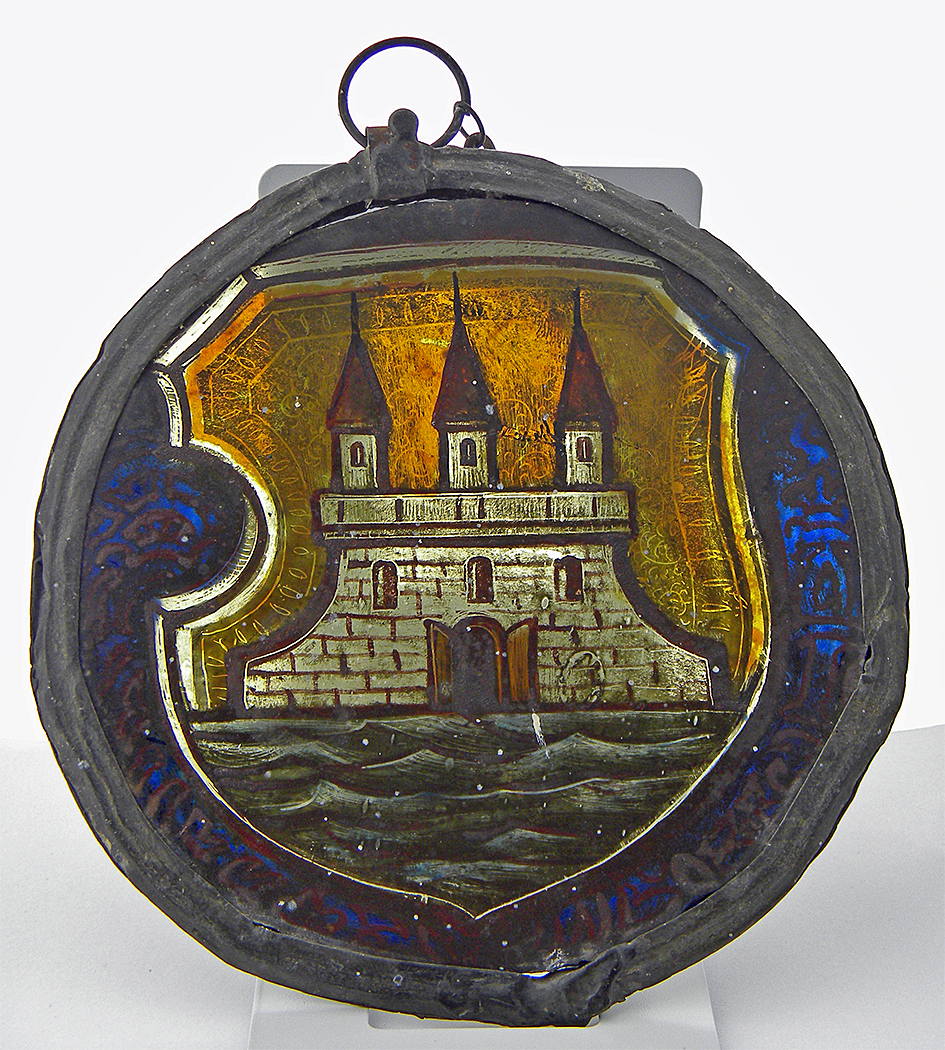
Coat of Arms of the City of Altona painted on glass around the 17th/ 18th century

=== Harburg ===
Harburg (current)

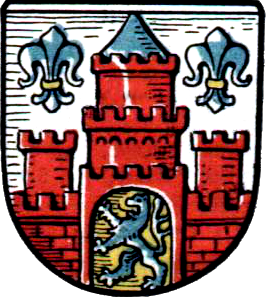
Harburg-Wilhelmsburg 1927–1937

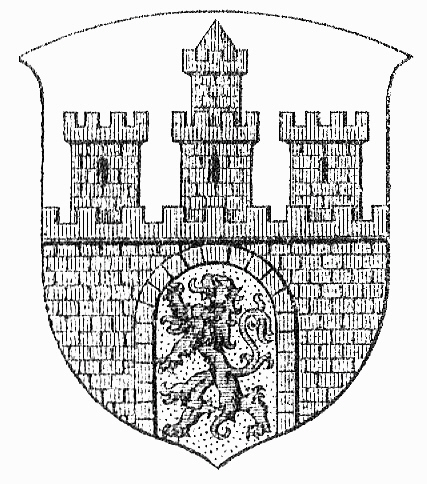
Harburg 1907

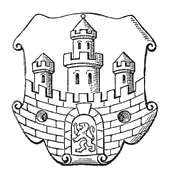
Harburg, circa 1885

=== Bergedorf ===
Bergedorf (current)

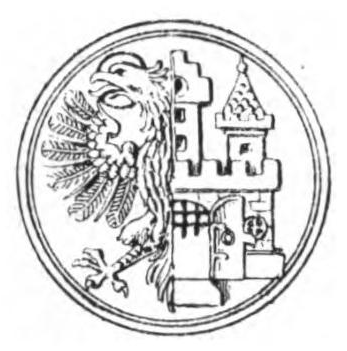
Coat of arms of Amt Bergedorf (1620–1871)

=== Other ===
Wandsbek

Eimsbüttel

Amt Ritzebüttel, now Cuxhaven (1720)

== Districts ==
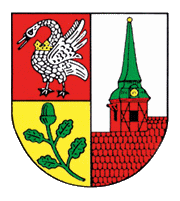
Bergstedt

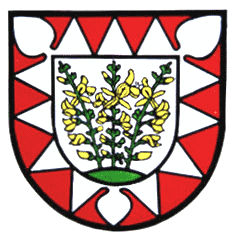
Bramfeld

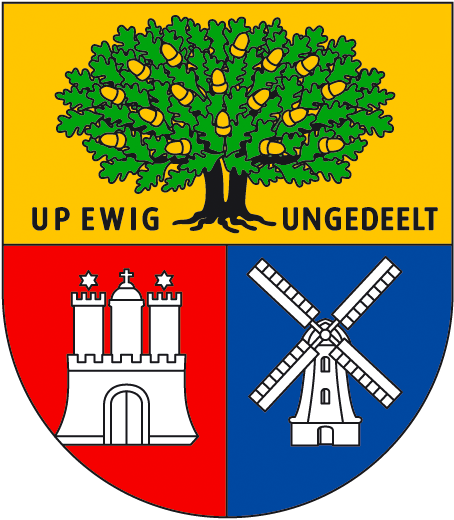
Eidelstedt

Langenhorn

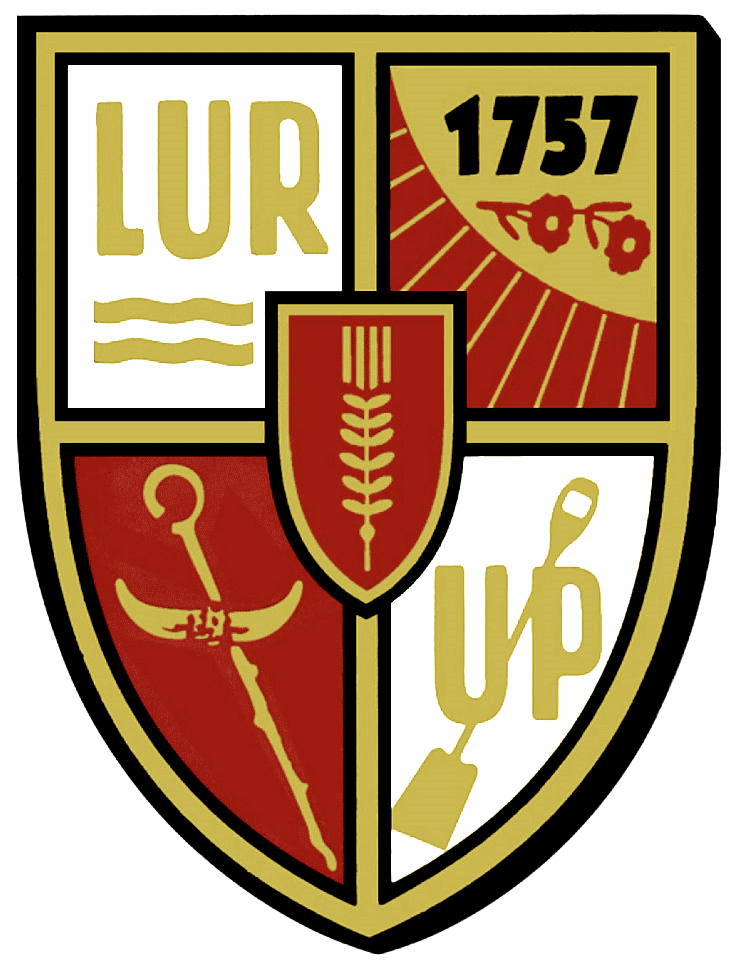
Lurup

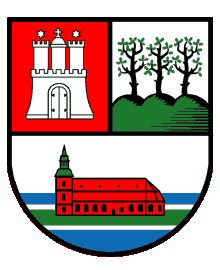
Ochsenwerder

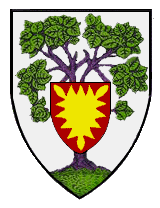
Ottensen

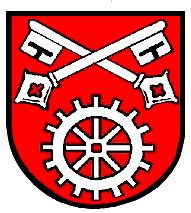
Wellingsbuettel

=== Wilhelmsburg ===
Wilhelmsburg

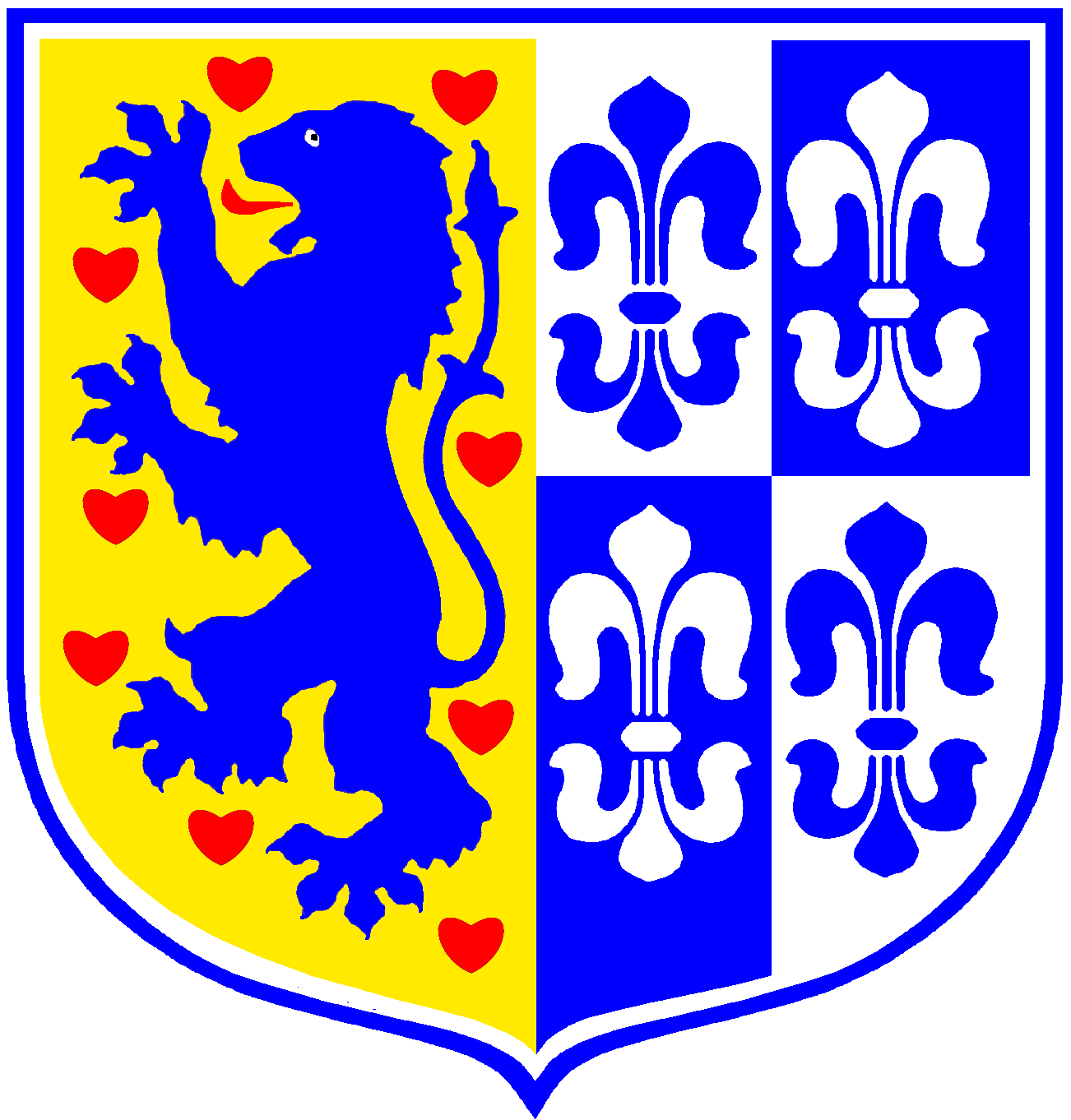
Large version

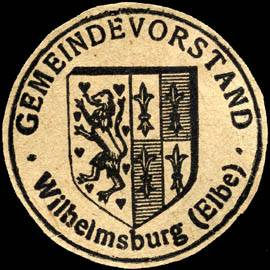
Seal (ca. 1850–1923)

== See also ==
- Coat of arms of Hamburg
- Flag of Hamburg
