= SS Donau =

Several steamships have borne the name Donau, after the German name for the river Danube:

- SS Donau (1868) was a 2,896-ton passenger/cargo ship launched on 17 October 1868, by Caird & Company, Greenock, Scotland.
- SS Donau (1882) was a 1,513-ton cargo ship launched on 18 July 1882, by Thompson, R. in Southwick, England for A.C. Mohr & Son. Sold to Settsu Kogyo in 1896, wrecked off Shanghai in 1908.
- SS Donau (1922 Rostock) was a 2,575-ton cargo ship completed as Osterndorf for the Vinnen Bros in June 1922, by Neptun AG in Rostock, Germany. Sold in 1925 to SM Vredebest and renamed Donau. Resold to the Hamburg America Line in 1927 and renamed Delos. Sunk in air attack off Tobruk 11 July 1941.
- SS Donau (1922 Lübeck) was a 1,927-ton cargo ship launched on 19 December 1922 by the Flender Werke in Lübeck, Germany, as Nicea for the Hamburg America Line. Acquired by the Kriegsmarine in 1937 and renamed Donau. Sunk in explosion at Flensburg, Germany on 14 June 1945.
- SS Donau (1929) was a 9,026-ton passenger/cargo ship completed in June 1929, by Deutsche Schiff- und Maschinenbau in Hamburg, Germany for Norddeutscher Lloyd. Sunk by Norwegian saboteurs in the Oslofjord on 17 January 1945. Scrapped in Bremerhaven in August 1952.
- SS Donau (1939) was a 2,931-ton cargo ship completed in March 1939, by Neptun AG in Rostock, Germany. for Harald Schuldt & Co KG. Torpedoed and sunk by the British submarine Trident on 30 August 1941, while carrying troops from Trondheim to Kirkenes in occupied Norway.
