= PS Alfred =

Passenger paddle steamer launched in 1863

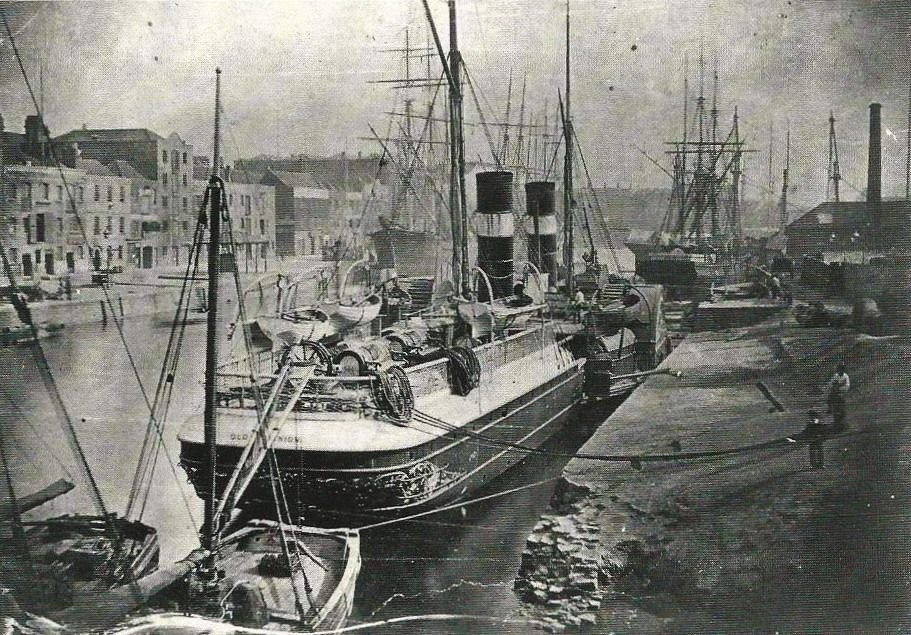
- The PS Alfred as the blockade runner Old Dominion

History

United Kingdom
- Name: 1863–1864: Alfred; 1864–1865: Old Dominion; 1865–1867: Sheffield; 1867–1885: Prince Arthur
- Owner: 1863–1864: Bristol General Steam Navigation Company; 1864–1865: George Campbell & Henry Collis; 1865–1867: Liverpool & Dublin Steam Navigation Co; 1867–1871: Thomas Carr & Frederick Kemp; 1871–1877: Lancashire and Yorkshire Railway; 1877–1883: Thomas Seed; 1883–1885: Robert Bruce
- Operator: 1863–1864: Bristol General Steam Navigation Company; 1864–1865: George Campbell & Henry Collis; 1865–1867: Liverpool & Dublin Steam Navigation Company; 1867–1871: Thomas Carr & Frederick Kemp; 1871–1877: Lancashire and Yorkshire Railway; 1877–1883: Thomas Seed; 1883–1885: Robert Bruce
- Port of registry: 1864: Bristol; 1865: Liverpool; 1867: Fleetwood; 1871: London; 1877: Fleetwood; 1883: Glasgow
- Route: 1871–1877: Belfast–Fleetwood
- Builder: Caird & Company, Greenock
- Yard number: 106
- Launched: 31 October 1863
- Out of service: 1885
- Identification: UK official number 45721
- Fate: Hulked 1885

General characteristics
- Tonnage: 703 GRT, 519 NRT
- Length: 227.8 ft (69.4 m)
- Beam: 26.2 ft (8.0 m)
- Depth: 14.2 ft (4.3 m)
- Propulsion: Oscillating steam engine

PS Alfred was a passenger paddle steamer that was launched in 1863. She was renamed Old Dominion in 1864, Sheffield in 1865, and Prince Arthur in 1867. She was acquired in 1871 by the London and North Western Railway (LNWR) and the Lancashire and Yorkshire Railway (L&YR), which operated her until 1877.

== History ==
The Bristol General Steam Navigation Company ordered the ship from Caird & Company of Greenock. She was launched on 31 October 1863. Before she was put into service she was purchased in May 1864 by George Campbell and Henry Collis, acting for the Virginia Importing and Exporting Company. She was renamed Old Dominion and used as a blockade runner.

She arrived at Wilmington, North Carolina on 28 June 1864 from Bermuda, and sailed back on 15 July 1864. A second voyage from Bermuda saw her arrive on 10 August 1864 again in Wilmington, North Carolina. She was used in the blockade running until February 1865. She made six successful runs through the blockade.

On her return to the UK, she was re-registered as Sheffield for the Liverpool and Dublin Steam Navigation Company. In 1867 Thomas Carr and Frederick Kemp acquired her and renamed her Prince Arthur.

In 1871 the LNWR and L&YR acquired Prince Arthur for their Fleetwood to Belfast and Londonderry service. In 1877 Thomas Seed bought her and registered her in Fleetwood. In 1883 Robert Bruce acquired her and registered her in Glasgow. In 1885 she was hulked.
