= Caird & Company =

Former Scottish shipbuilding and engineering firm

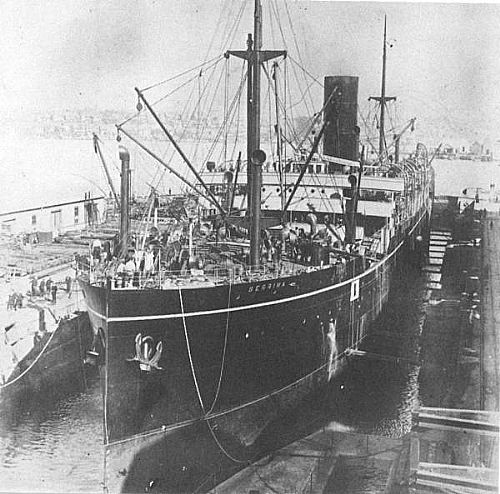
Part of Caird & Co's yard in 1913, with SS Berrima under construction

Caird & Company was a Scottish shipbuilding and engineering firm based in Greenock. The company was established in 1828 by John Caird when he received an order to re-engine Clyde paddle-tugs.

John's relative James Tennant Caird joined the company in 1831, and after leaving to work for Randolph, Elder & Co in Glasgow, rejoined the family business for good in 1838.

A year after the death of Robert Caird, the company was sold to Harland & Wolff Ltd in 1916 for £432,493. The firm continued trading as a separate enterprise, with Arthur and Patrick Caird on the board, until 1922. The Arthur Street engine works was sold to John G. Kincaid & Company in 1919.

== Ships fitted with engines by Caird & Co ==
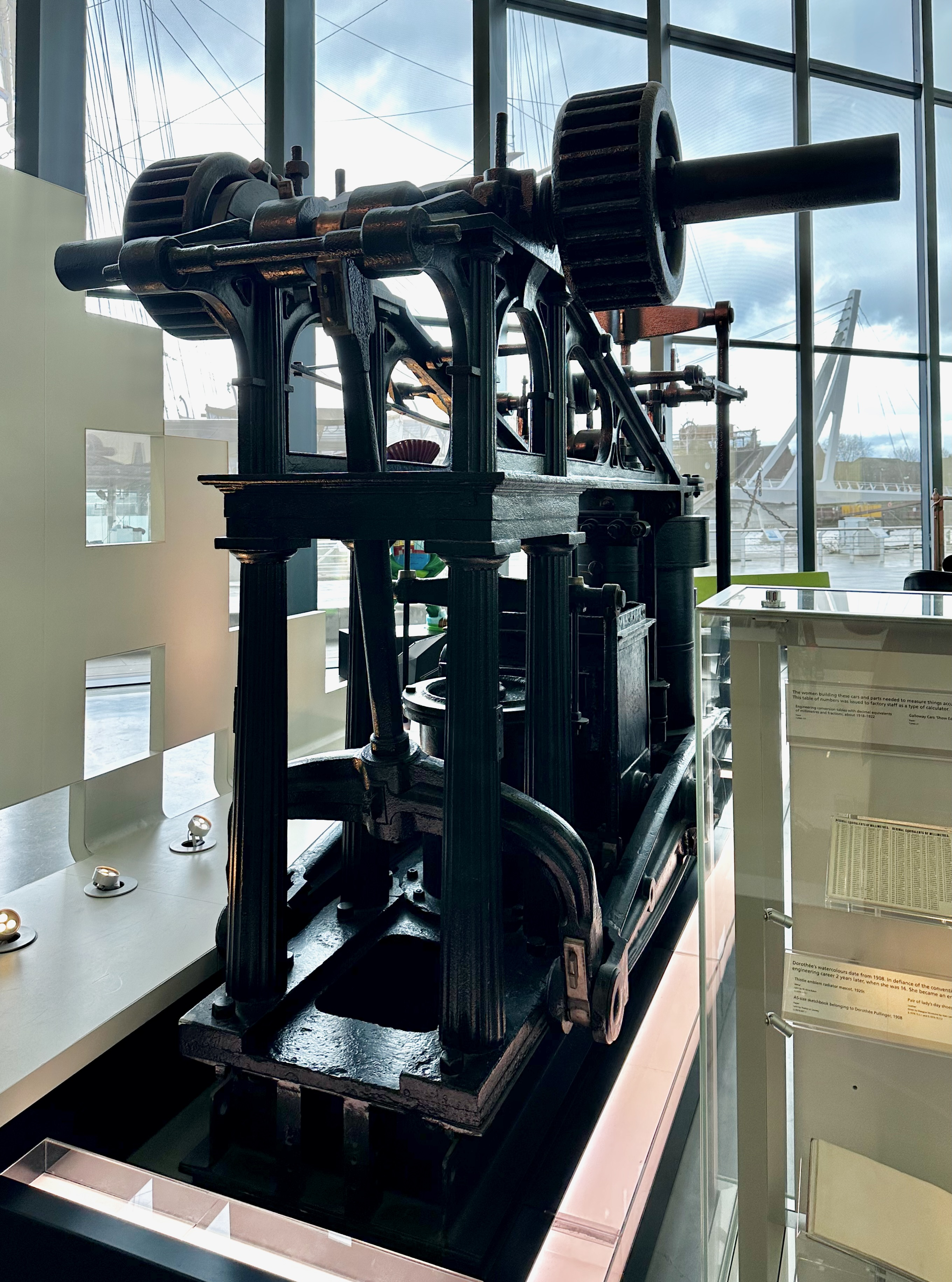
1828 marine side-lever steam engine built by Caird & Company, Greenock, for PS Industry

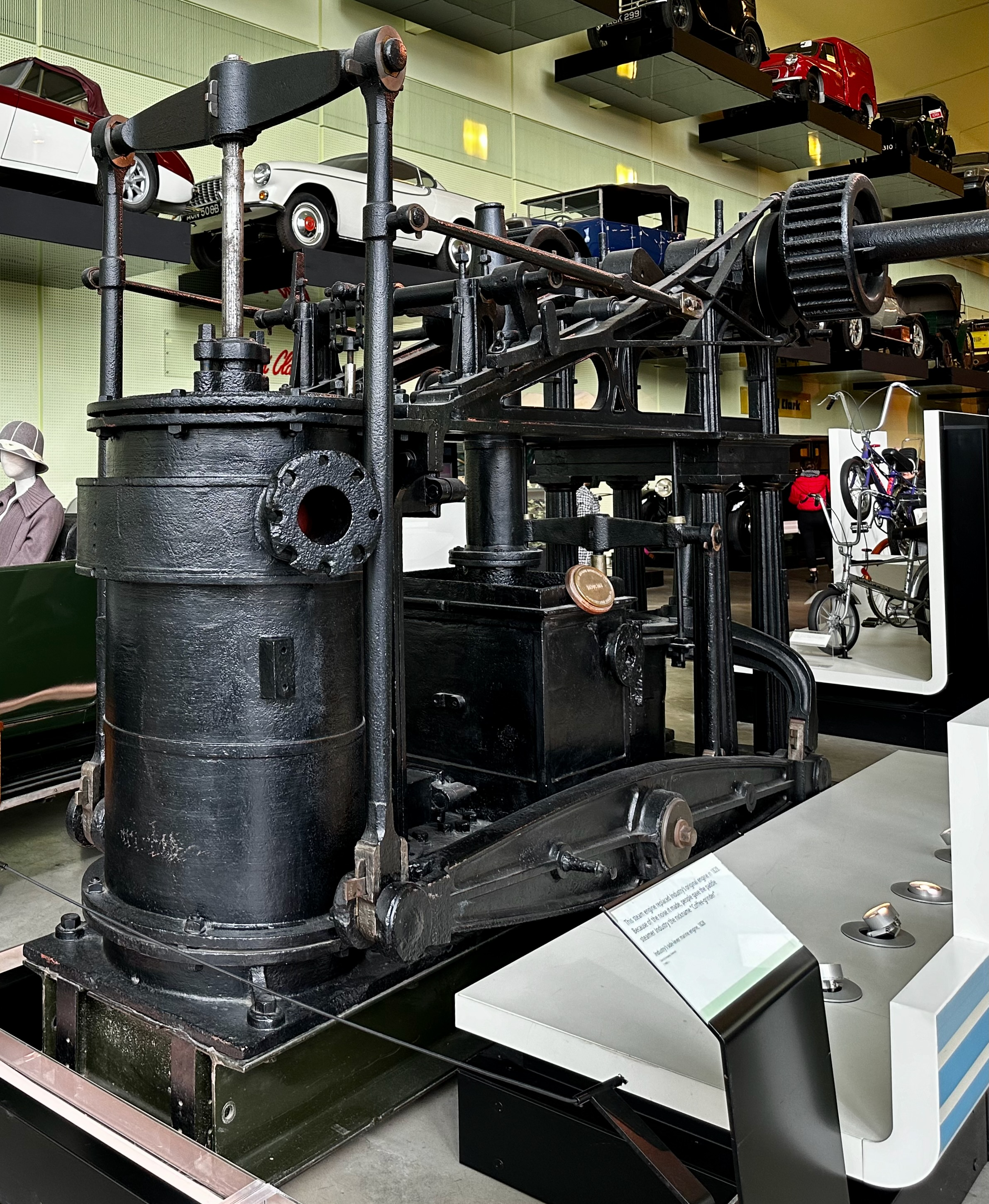
PS Industry engine in the Riverside Museum, Glasgow

Drawing of Caird Engine fitted to 1841 steam packets

Drawing of Caird Engine fitted to 1841 steam packets

In the early years Caird & Co were responsible for fitting (or re-fitting) steam engines in ships. An example of this is the Glasgow fitted with a side-lever engine by Caird & Co in 1828 for G & J Burns. This being an engine running on only 5psi steam pressure, as was common at the time (the steam condenser created a vacuum so the effective pressure acting on the piston was the difference between the boiler pressure and the condenser vacuum). Also in 1828 Caird & Co re-engined the paddle steamer Industry (built in 1814 by William Fyfe of Fairlie), replacing the original single cylinder engine rated at 10 hp with a Caird single cylinder engine rated at 14 hp.

In 1845 details and drawings of Caird engines fitted in four West India Mail-Packets were published, these being the "Clyde", "Tay", "Tweed" and "Teviot". These were also side-lever engines, with two cylinders of diameter of 74.5in and stroke of 90in, driving 30 ft paddle-wheels, running at 15rpm. These mail packets were operated by the Royal Mail Steam Packet Company. Collated records of ships built on the Clyde suggest that Caird contracted out the building of the wooden hulls for these mail packets.

- The Clyde was built by Robert Duncan of Greenock and launched in Feb 1841, registered Dec 1841.
- The Tay was built by Charles Wood of Dumbarton, launched in July 1841, registered Dec 1841.
- The Tweed was built by Thomson & Speirs of Greenock, launched in Apr 1841, registered in Dec 1841.
- The Teviot was built by Robert Duncan of Greenock, launched in Oct 1841, registered in Feb 1842.

Other ships fitted with engines by Caird include :

- The steam tugs Hercules and Gulliver built by Robert Steele & Co of Greenock in 1820s
- The paddle-steamer Liverpool built by Robert Steele & Co of Greenock 1830
- The steam tug Samson built by William Denny of Dumbarton in 1819. Caird engine fitted 1831
- The paddle-steamer Gazelle built by Murries & Clark of Greenock 1832
- The paddle-steamer Dolphin built by James Lang of Dumbarton 1834
- The paddle-steamer Eagle built by Robert Steele & Co of Greenock 1835
- The paddle-steamer Unicorn built by Robert Steele & Co of Greenock 1836
- The paddle-steamer Juno built by Robert Duncan of Greenock 1837
- The paddle-steamer Achilles built by Robert Steels & Co, launched May 1839
- The tug Conqueror built by Robert Duncan of Greenock 1840
- The paddle-steamer Flambeau built by Robert Duncan of Greenock 1840

Following this Caird fitted engines to a significant number of screw-steamers built by other companies (i.e. propeller driven) particularly those built by Denny of Dumbarton up until 1851, and other ship builders until 1863.

== Ships built by Caird & Co ==
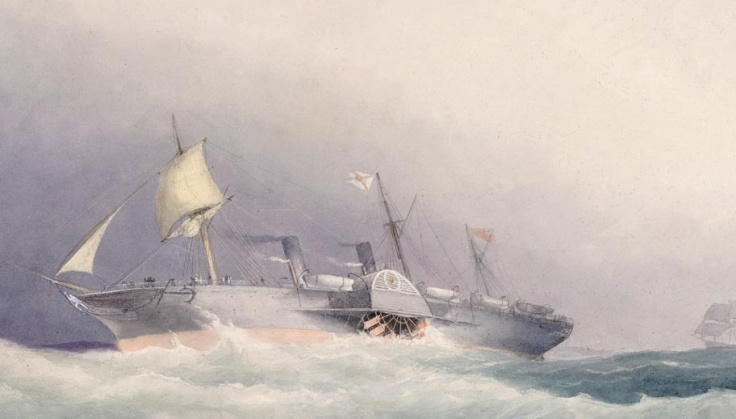
Painting of SS Atrato by William Frederick Mitchell

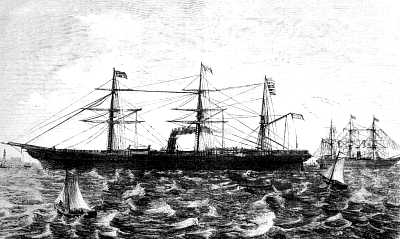
SS Austria, launched on 23 June 1857

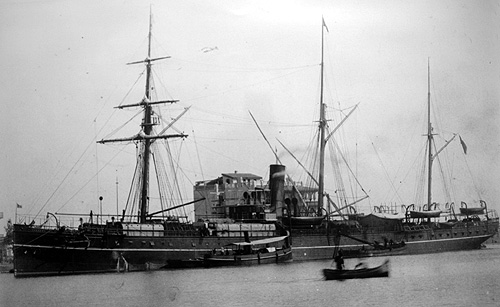
SS Bokhara in the 1880s

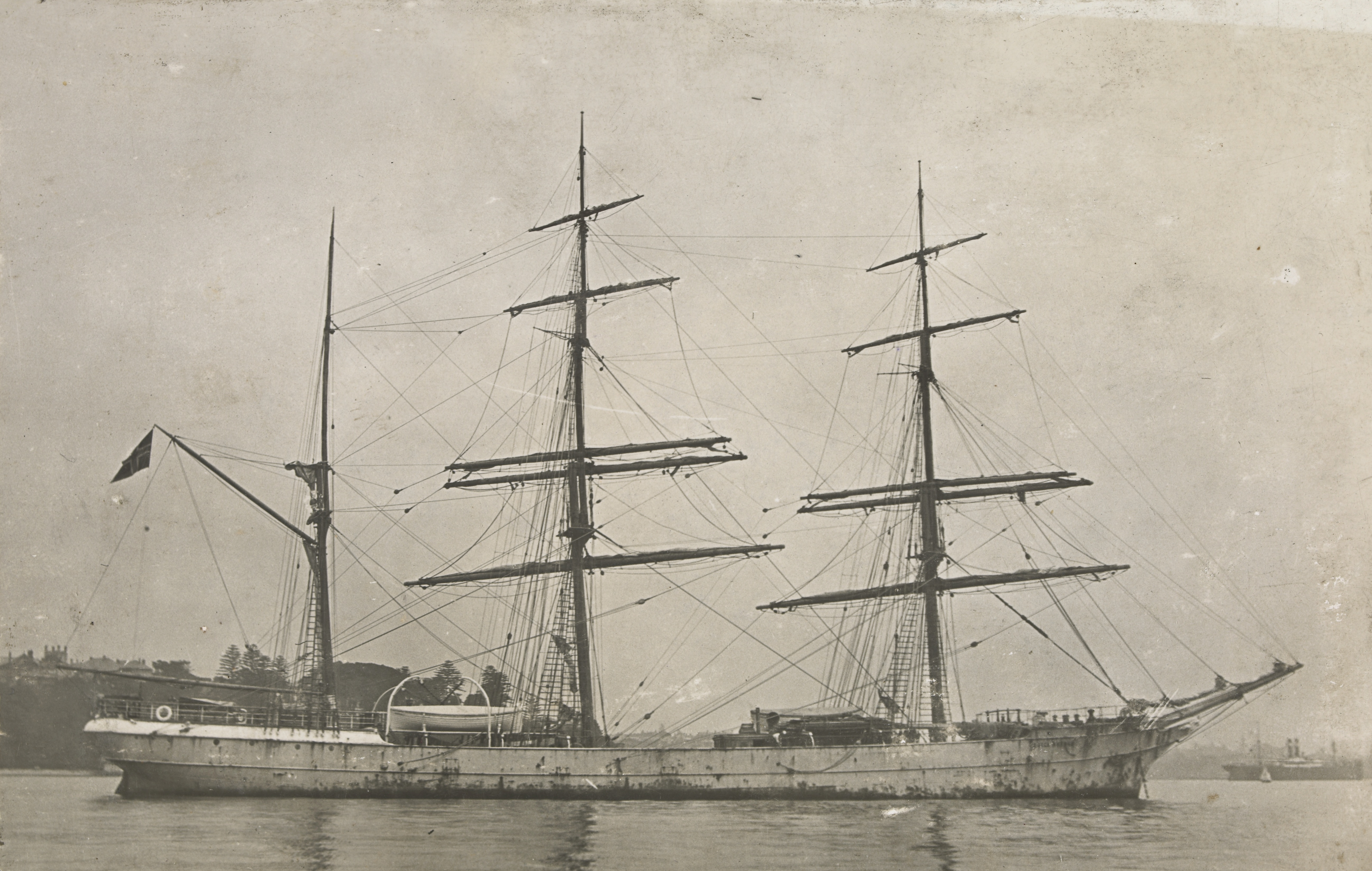
The barque Inchgreen

Picture postcard of RMS Arabia

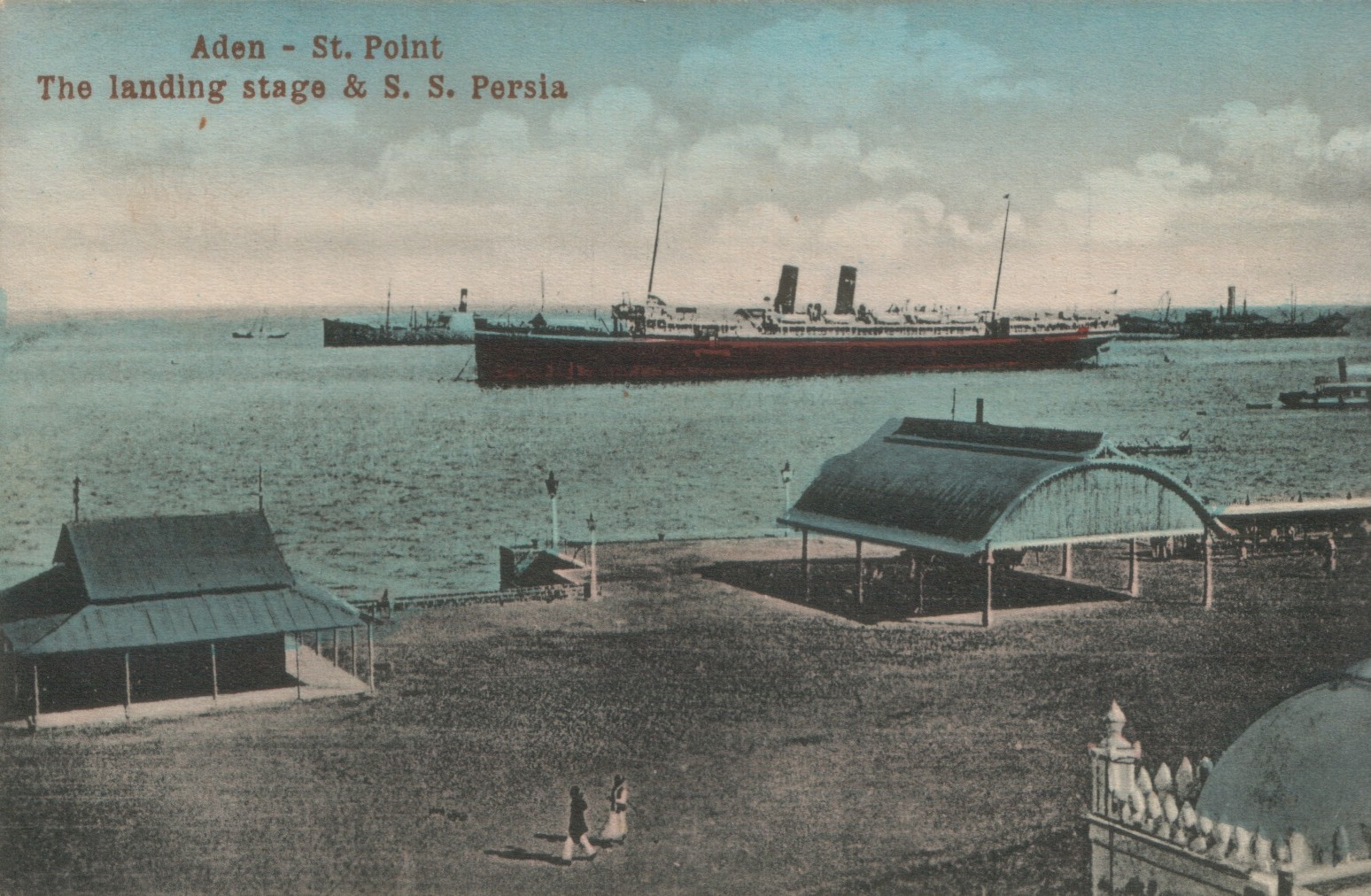
Picture postcard of SS Persia at Aden in about 1910

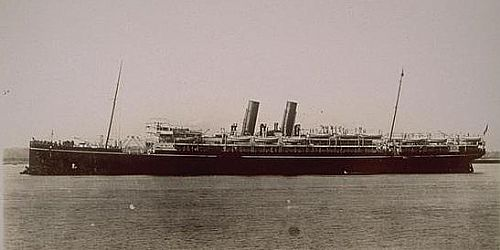
RMS Moldavia

- PS Sea Nymph (1845)
- PS Tynwald (1846)
- SS Atrato (1853)
- SS Hammonia (1855)
- SS Teutonia (1856)
- SS Austria (1857)
- SS Saxonia (1857)
- SS Bremen 1 (1858)
- SS Hansa (1861)
- SS Lord Clyde (1862)
- PS Alfred (1863)
- SS Germania (1863)
- PS Snaefell (1863)
- RMS Eider (1864)
- PS Agnes E. Fry (1864)
- PS Douglas (1864)
- SS Hermann (1864)
- PS Stanley (1864)
- SS Princess Alice (1865)
- SS Deutschland (1866)
- PS Tynwald (1866)
- SS Baltimore (1867)
- SS Berlin (1867)
- SS Cimbria (1867)
- SS Weser (1867)
- SS Rhein 1 (1868)
- SS Donau (1868)
- SS Main (1868)
- SS Westphalia (1868)
- SS Leipzig (1869)
- SS Ohio (1869)
- SS Silesia (1869)
- SS Germania (1870)
- SS Vandalia (1871)
- SS Bokhara (1872)
- SS Frisia (1872)
- SS Strassburg (1872)
- RMS City of Chester (1873)
- SS Oder (1873)
- SS Saint Simon (ex-Rhenania) (1873)
- SS City of Berlin (1874)
- SS Governor General Loudon (1875)
- SV Inchgreen (1876)
- PS Snaefell (1876)
- SS Valetta (1883)
- SS Coromandel (1885)
- RMS Orinoco (1886)
- SS Gulf of Lions (1890)
- SS Gulf of Genoa (1891)
- SS Gulf of Bothnia (1891)
- SS Gulf of Siam (1892)
- SS Gulf of Taranto (1892)
- SS India (1896)
- RMS Arabia (1897)
- SS Assaye (1899)
- SS Sobraon (1900)
- SS Persia (1900)
- SS Plassy (1901)
- RMS Moldavia (1903)
- SS Wimmera (1904)
- SS Delhi (1905)
- SS Devanha (1905)
- SS Marama (1907)
- SS Malwa (1908)
- SS Mantua (1909)
- RMS Medina (1911)
- HMAS Berrima (1914)
- HMS P.22 (1916)
- HMS P.35 (1917)
- HMS P.42 (1917)
- HMS P.43 (1917)
- SS Burgondier (1918)

== Notable members of the Caird family ==
- Edward Caird, philosopher
- John Caird, Principal and Vice-Chancellor of the University of Glasgow
- Robert Caird, head of the company
