= Agnes E. Fry =

Confederate naval vessel

History

Confederate States of America
- Name: Agnes E. Fry
- Builder: Caird & Company, Greenock
- Launched: 26 March 1864
- Fate: Scuttled, c. January 1865

General characteristics
- Type: Blockade runner
- Propulsion: Two oscillating cylinder steam engines

Agnes E. Fry was a US Confederate blockade runner built by the shipyard of Caird & Company in Greenock on the lower River Clyde in Scotland, and launched on 26 March 1864 under the name of "Fox". The paddle steamer had an iron hull, and was powered by two oscillating cylinder steam engines. The ship was under the command of Joseph Fry, who renamed it after his wife when he took command. She was scuttled near the mouth of the Cape Fear River, Oak Island, North Carolina sometime around January 1865. The ship's wreckage may have been found by sonar on 27 February 2016.
