= SS Donau (1868) =

History
- Name: SS Donau
- Operator: Norddeutscher Lloyd
- Route: Bremen - Baltimore
- Builder: Caird & Company of Greenock, Scotland
- Yard number: 147
- Launched: October 17, 1868
- Christened: SS Donau
- Maiden voyage: January 16, 1869 Bremen-Baltimore
- Homeport: Bremen
- Fate: Sold in 1889 & Struck by fire in 1895

General characteristics
- Type: Passenger Cargo Vessel (1868-1889) Cargo Only (1889-1895)
- Tonnage: 2,869 gross tons
- Length: 332 feet
- Propulsion: Steam, Screw
- Speed: 13 Knots

SS Donau was an Passenger and Cargo Vessel owned by Norddeutscher Lloyd. The ship was built by Caird & Company of Greenock, Scotland, in 1868 and served the Bremen-Baltimore line from January 16, 1869 until 1889 when she was sold. In 1895 she was destroyed by a fire in the North Atlantic while en route to Philadelphia. Everyone on board was rescued by the British steam ship Delaware.
