= SS Douglas (1864) =

Iron-built paddle steamer

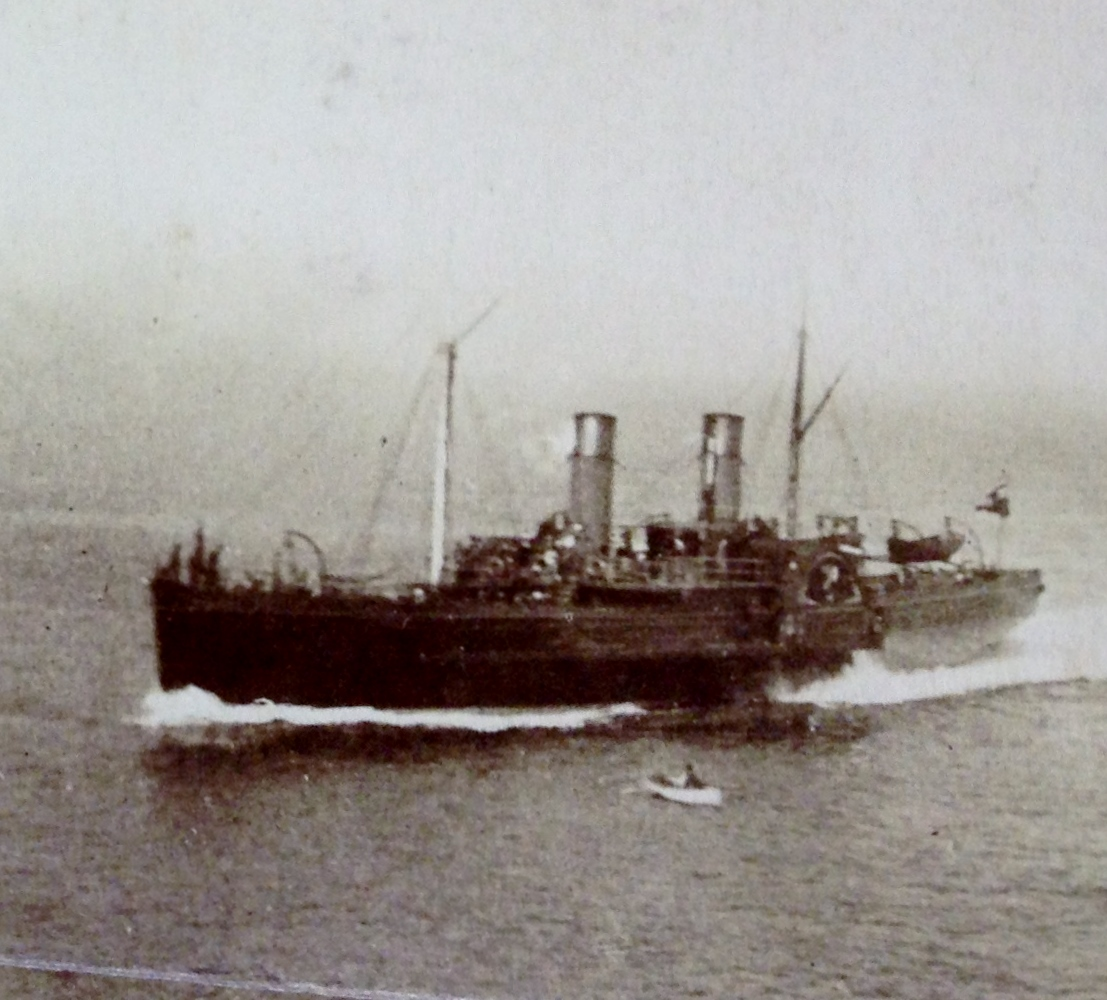
- RMS Douglas approaching Douglas, Isle of Man

History
- Name: Douglas
- Owner: 1864–1888: IOMSPCo.
- Operator: 1864–1888: IOMSPCo.
- Port of registry: Douglas, Isle of Man
- Builder: Caird & Co., Greenock
- Cost: £24,869
- Launched: 11 May 1864
- Out of service: 1888
- Identification: Official Number 45470; Code Letters V D L H
- Fate: Scrapped

General characteristics
- Type: Paddle steamer
- Tonnage: 709 gross register tons (GRT)
- Length: 227 feet (69 m)
- Beam: 26 feet (7.9 m)
- Depth: 14 feet (4.3 m)
- Ice class: N/A
- Installed power: 1,400 shp (1,000 kW)
- Propulsion: Two-cylinder oscillating engines working at 25 pounds per square inch (170 kPa), producing an indicated horsepower of approximately 1,400 shp (1,000 kW)
- Speed: 15 knots (28 km/h; 17 mph)

SS (RMS) Douglas (II) No. 45470 – the second vessel in the line's history to be so named – was an iron-built paddle steamer operated by the Isle of Man Steam Packet Company.

Douglas was the second of three ships ordered for the company from the yards of Caird & Co. of Greenock, and was launched on 11 May 1864.

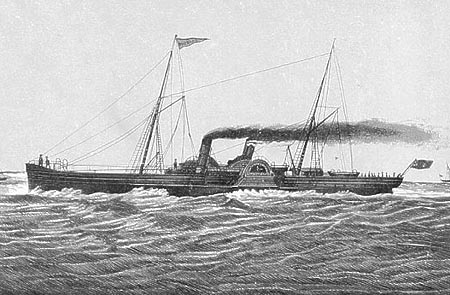
Sketch of Douglas.

== Dimensions ==
Built at Greenock, Douglas cost £24,869. She had a registered tonnage of 709 GRT; length 227 ft; beam 26 ft; depth 14 ft.

Douglas had a service speed of 15 knots (28 km/h; 17 mph), with an indicated horse power listed as 1400, and a boiler pressure of 25 pounds per square inch (170 kPa). She had one funnel forward and one aft of the paddle boxes, with the main mast close to the after funnel.

== Service life ==
Douglas and her two sisters, Snaefell and Tynwald, were all considered to be fast vessels. Indeed, Snaefell is documented as being able to perform the run from Douglas to Liverpool in 4 hours 20 minutes, which would suggest a speed of slightly in excess of 15 knots (28 km/h; 17 mph).

== Gallery ==
RMS Douglas
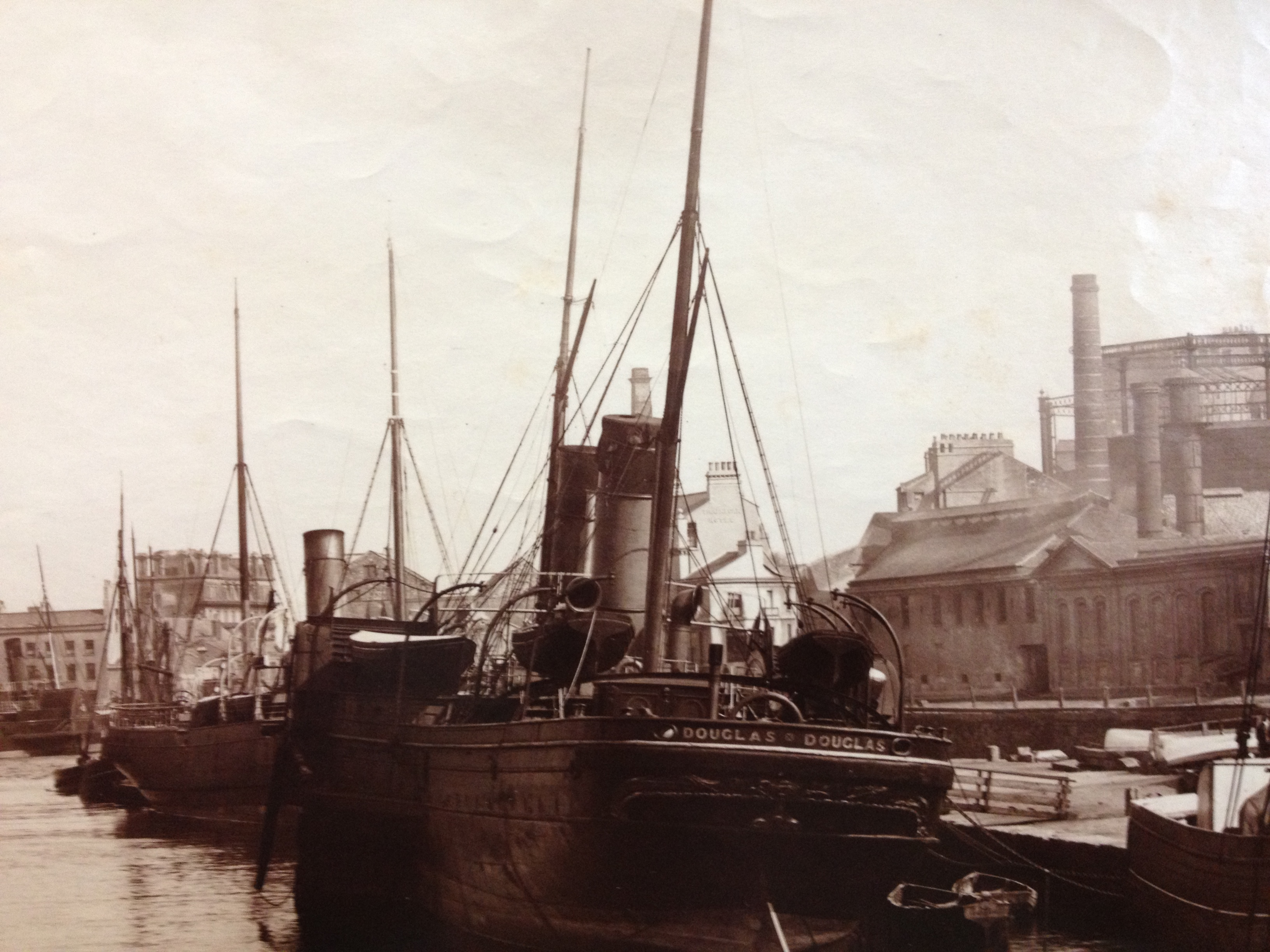
Douglas laid up at the Tongue, Douglas

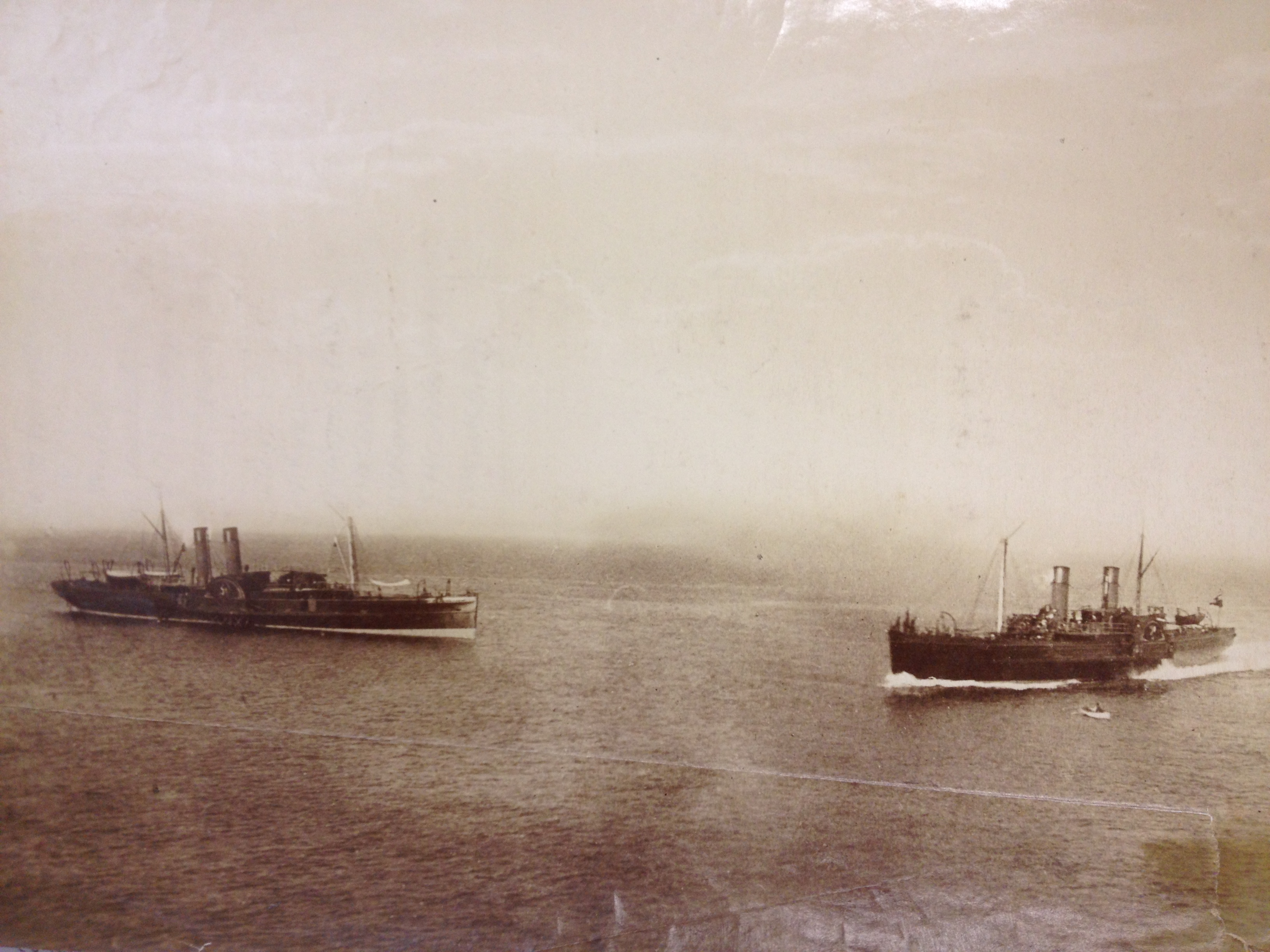
Tynwald (left) and Douglas (right)

Douglas was considered a successful ship, and was reboilered in 1869 at a cost of £4,000.

== Disposal ==
After an uneventful career with the company, Douglas, along with her sister Tynwald, were disposed of by auction in 1888. The two ships together realised the sum of £24,622.
