= Robert Caird =

Scottish shipbuilder (died 1915)

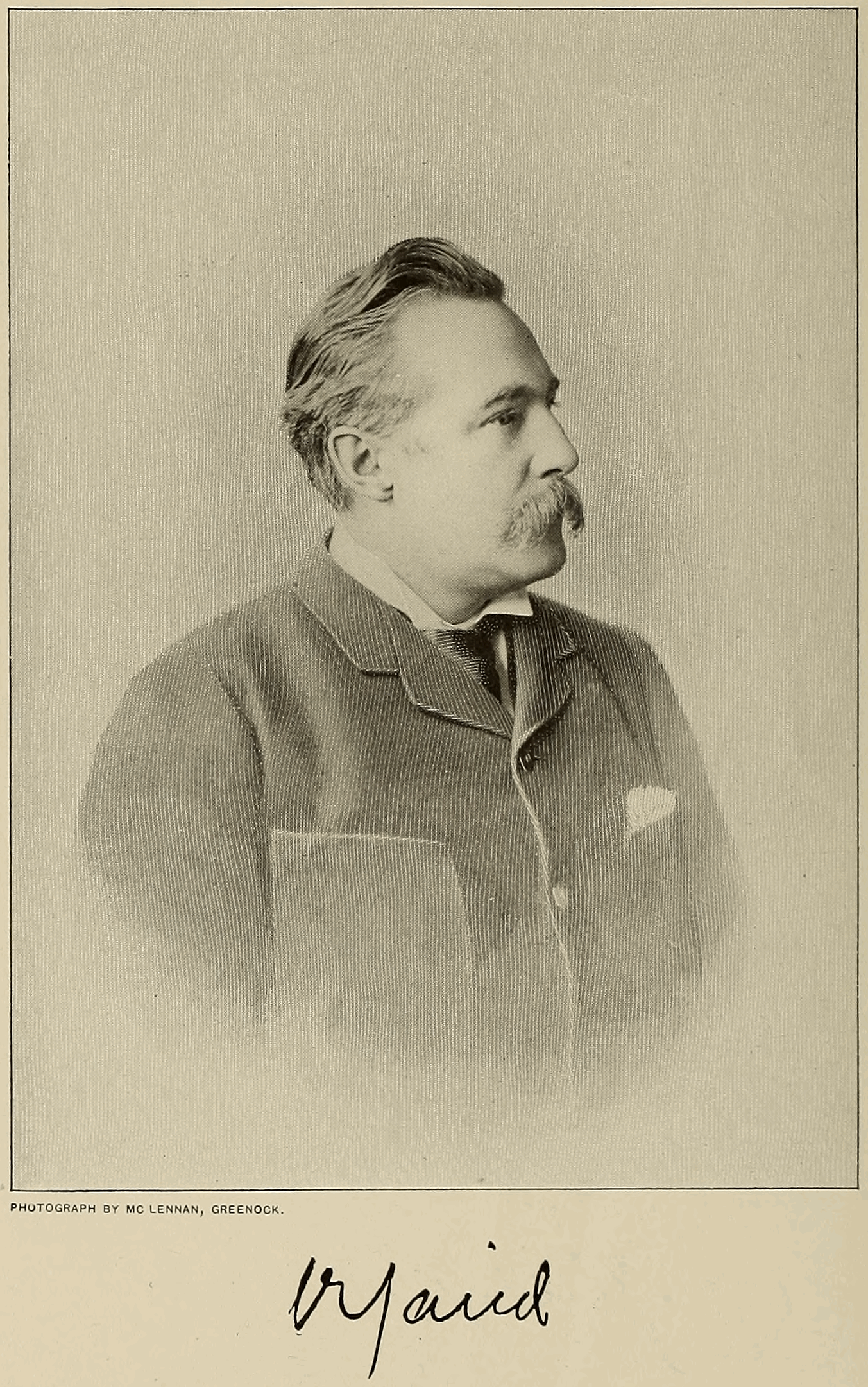
Photo of Robert Caird from the August 1897 edition of Cassier's Magazine.

Robert Caird FRSE LLD (died 1 December 1915 in Greenock) was a Scottish shipbuilder. He joined the family firm Caird and Company in 1888, later rising to become head of the company.

== Life and career ==
Robert Caird was born in either 1851 or 1852. He went to school in Greenock and later attended the University of Glasgow. After completing his education, Caird went to Italy and then to the United States, where he was employed by the Pullman Car Company, "and got an insight into American business methods". Robert Caird returned to Greenock shortly before his father's death in 1888 and joined the family firm. He was president of the Institution of Engineers & Shipbuilders in Scotland (1899–1901).

He was proposed for fellowship of the Royal Society of Edinburgh by Sir William Thomson (later Lord Kelvin), Andrew Wilson, Sir I Bayley Balfour and Sir Archibald Denny, and was elected on 7 December 1896. He was awarded an LLD by the University of Glasgow in 1900.
