= SS Teutonia (1856) =

Teutonia
- Teutonia underway in heavy seas

History
- Name: Teutonia (1856–84); Regina (1884–89); Piemontese (1889–90); Città di Savona (1890–91); Mentana (1891–94)
- Owner: Hamburg Brazilianische Packetschiffahrt Gesellschaft (1856–58); Hamburg Amerika Line (1858–77); Henry Flinn (1877–78); Mississippi and Dominion Steamship Co (1878–82); T Barker (1882–84); Mississippi and Dominion Steamship Co (1884); Francesco Costa (1884–91); Schiaffino (1891–91)
- Operator: As owner, except Dominion Steamship Co (1877–78)
- Port of registry: Hamburg (1856–71); (German Empire) Hamburg, Germany (1871–77); (United Kingdom of Great Britain and Ireland) Liverpool, United Kingdom (1877–82); (United Kingdom of Great Britain and Ireland) Cardiff (1882–84); Italy (1884–89)
- Builder: Caird & Company
- Yard number: 48
- Launched: 4 October 1856
- Maiden voyage: 20 December 1856
- Identification: United Kingdom Official Number 76476 (1877–84)
- Fate: Scrapped 1894

General characteristics
- Tonnage: 2,693 GRT
- Length: 212 ft 1 in (64.64 m)
- Beam: 39 ft 4 in (11.99 m)
- Depth: 17 ft 8 in (5.38 m)
- Installed power: Steam engine, 350hp (1856–62); Compound steam engine, 300nhp (1862–94)
- Propulsion: Single screw propeller, sails
- Sail plan: Barque rigged
- Speed: 12 knots (22 km/h)
- Notes: Sister ship:Petropolis

Teutonia was a screw steamer that was built by Caird & Company, Greenock, Renfrewshire, Scotland for the Hamburg Brazilianische Packetschiffahrt Gesellschaft in 1856. It later served with the Hamburg Amerika Line before being sold to British owners in 1877 and Italian owners in 1884, serving them under the names Regina, Piemontese, Città di Savona and Mentana The ship was scrapped in 1894.

== Description ==
It was a 2,693 gross ton ship. The ship was 212 feet 1 inch (64.64 m) long, with a beam of 39 feet 4 inches (11.99 m) and a depth of 17 feet 8 inches (5.38 m). A 350hp steam engine drove a single screw propeller. The ship had a maximum speed under steam of 12 knots (22 km/h). Also propelled by sails, the ship was rigged as a barque. The ship had accommodation for 50 first class, 135 second class and 310 third class passengers. Her sister ship was Petropolis.

== Career ==
The ship was built as yard number 48 by Caird & Company at its Cartsdyke Mid Yard in Greenock, Renfrewshire, United Kingdom for the Hamburg Brazilianische Packetschiffahrt Gesellschaft. Its port of registry was Hamburg. The ship was launched on 4 October 1856. It sailed from Hamburg on its maiden voyage on 20 December for Southampton, Hampshire, United Kingdom then Lisbon, Portugal, Pernambuco, Bahia and Rio de Janeiro, Empire of Brazil. On 7 March 1857, Teutonia collided with the British schooner Smuggler in the Bay of Biscay whilst on a voyage from Brazil to Southampton, United Kingdom. Smuggler sank with the loss of four crew. The captain of Smuggler was the only survivor. On 10 January 1858, she rescued the crew of the French barque Louis Armand, which had sprung a leak in the Atlantic Ocean and was sinking.

In 1858, the ship was sold to the Hamburg Amerika Line. On 2 June 1860, Teutonia ran aground on the Brambles, in the Solent. She was refloated after two hours. In 1862, a new compound steam engine was installed. Built by the Rieherstieg Schiffswerfte und Maschinenfabrik, Hamburg, it had cylinders of 48 inches (120 cm) and 80 inches (200 cm) diameter by 36 inches (91 cm) stroke. In January 1869, she collided with the steamship A. G. Brown in the Mississippi River, sinking her.

In 1877, Teutonia was sold to Henry Flinn, Liverpool, Lancashire, United Kingdom. The ship was reflagged to the United Kingdom and registered at Liverpool. The United Kingdom official number 76476 was allocated. It was operated under the management of the Dominion Line of London. In December, she ran aground 2 nautical miles (3.7 km) off Cape Mayor, near Santander, Spain. In 1878, the ship was sold to the Mississippi and Dominion Steamship Co, Liverpool. In November 1880, she caught fire at New Orleans, Louisiana, United States. In 1882, Teutonia was sold T Baker and registered at Cardiff, Glamorgan. It was sold back to the Mississippi and Dominion Steamship Co in 1884 and was sold later that year to Francesco Costa, Italy and renamed Regina. Renamed Piemontese in 1889 and Città di Savona in 1890; the ship was sold in 1891 to the Italian company Schiaffino and renamed Mentana. The ship was scrapped in 1894 at La Spezia, Italy.
