= SS Baltimore =

History

German Empire
- Name: SS Baltimore
- Operator: Norddeutscher Lloyd (North German Lloyd)
- Route: Bremen to Baltimore (1868–1884) Bremen to South America (1880–1893)
- Builder: Caird & Company, Greenock, Scotland
- Yard number: Westburn Yard, #139
- Launched: 3 August 1867
- Maiden voyage: 3 March 1868
- Out of service: After completion of the 25 December 1893 sailing
- Fate: Scrapped at Vegesck 1894

General characteristics
- Type: Passenger cargo vessel; Iron screw steamer
- Tonnage: 2,321 GRT (as built); 2,292 GRT (1875)
- Length: 285 ft (87 m) (as built) 294 ft (90 m) (1875)
- Beam: 30 ft (9.1 m) (as built) 38 ft (12 m) (1875)
- Draught: 17 feet carrying 1270 tons
- Depth: 31 ft (9.4 m) (as built) 28 ft (8.5 m) (1875)
- Propulsion: direct-acting engines of 300 nhp, having inverted cylinders, surface-condensers, super-heating apparatus, together with Krupps' steel shaft.
- Sail plan: 2 masts rigged for sailing
- Speed: 11 knots (20 km/h; 13 mph)
- Capacity: 84 1st class; 600 3rd class
- Notes: In 1875, ship was lengthened. In 1881, engines were compounded by AG Weser, Bremen

SS Baltimore was an iron passenger steamship of the North German Lloyd (Norddeutscher Lloyd) line, built by Caird & Company of Greenock, Scotland in 1867. She was used for most of her career to bring German immigrants to Baltimore.

== History ==
In January 1867, the North German Lloyd company proposed regular service between Bremen, Southampton, and Baltimore. To that end, the company placed an order with Caird & Company for two large screw steamers for this new line. The keel of Baltimore was laid in March 1867. The ship was launched on 3 August 1867 and was named Baltimore by Mrs. Robert Blair of Haylee.

At the time, a reporter from The Glasgow Herald wrote "The Baltimore is the forerunner of the fleet, and, judging from her beautiful model, the completeness of her arrangements, and the enterprise of the company to who she belongs, there can be no doubt she will speedily establish for the company a trade as extensive and prosperous as the Bremen and New York fleet, built by the same eminent builders."

On 12 February 1868, the Baltimore left the builder's shipyard for Bremen. The Bremen-Baltimore line opened on 1 March and on 3 March the Baltimore set sail from Bremen for Southampton and sailed from Southampton on 4 March for her first transatlantic trip. The Baltimore arrived at the Locust Point dock on the south side of Baltimore Harbor on 23 March. She was only the second iron steamship ever in port. The people of Baltimore marked the arrival of the steamer on her first sailing on 26 March with a parade headed by the Governor with state and local dignitaries, Infantry, Cavalry, Artillery, and local groups as well as celebrations, closing of public schools and markets, and a public holiday. The War Department ordered a salute fired from Fort McHenry as a national recognition of the arrival of the first North German Lloyd steamer.

The Baltimore presented a beautiful appearance as she entered the port with the American flag flying from the mainmast, the Bremen flag beneath, and the magnificent flag of the German Confederation at the stern, with sixty-one flags and private signals flying from her rigging. As the noble ship passed Fort McHenry she fired a salute and another was fired as she entered the extensive new dock at Locust Point, on the south side of the harbor.

— The Baltimore Sun

== Death of two captains ==
SS Baltimore had an unusual occurrence. Both of her first two captains died at sea between Bremen and Baltimore. The ship's first captain, Captain Wilhelm Vöckler (also spelled Voeckler; age 50 of Bremerhaven) died on 8 March 1871. Baltimore had left Bremen on 2 March and Southampton on 5 March. Captain Voeckler had been ill prior to sailing, with dropsy (edema) of the stomach, but was feeling better and insisted on making the voyage. He succumbed to his illness and died after four days at sea on 8 March. The first officer, Captain Theodor Deetjen, assumed command for the remainder of the voyage and Baltimore sailed in to port with her colors half-mast. Captain Vöckler was buried at sea.

Captain Carl Fischer (age 37, native of the Kingdom of Hanover) died 26 April 1872, just as Baltimore was entering Cape Henry, Virginia and the day before arriving at the port of Baltimore. Baltimore sailed from Bremen on 10 April and from Southampton on 13 April. Captain Fischer had been quite sick during the passage, but attended to his duties. On 26 April, he had a stroke and died within moments. The first officer, Captain Deetjen, once again assumed command and Baltimore sailed in with her colors half-mast. Captain Fischer was buried at Greenmount Cemetery in Baltimore, Maryland.

== Collision ==
On the night of 22 May 1872, the steamer Baltimore, under command of Captain Deetjen, was leaving Southampton heading for Bremen with about 120 passengers and cargo aboard. Mid-channel Baltimore collided with the Spanish screw steamship Lorenzo Semprum off the coast of Hastings, England. According to one account, Baltimore was "run down" by the other ship. The other steamer kept course without stopping to render assistance.

The collision left a large hole, 18 feet (5 m) long and 7 feet (2 m) wide, in the bow causing the forward compartment to be filled with water. The equipment on Baltimore used to lower the lifeboats would not work, but passengers and crew were rescued by the ten men of the Hastings Coastguard. The leak was stopped and the water was pumped out of the hold with the assistance of steam fire engines. The ship was towed by steam tugs to Southampton and put into the dock for repairs.

The Spanish steamer put in to dock at Southampton for repairs on 25 May 1872. They also had considerable damage, but had no injuries and the cargo was undamaged.

== Sailings ==
Baltimore sailed under 14 official captains (Vöckler, Fischer, Lillenhain, Andressen, Dehle, Limon, Hellmers, Kohlmann, Hagemann, Bauer, Kessler, Thumann, Reimkasten, and Hashagen) and one unofficial captain (Deetjen). Baltimore sailed from Bremen to Southampton to Baltimore 51 times; the first trip was on 3 March 1868 and the last trip was on 5 March 1884. Baltimore sailed once from Bremen to New York on 11 April 1880. Baltimore also sailed from Bremen to various South American ports 47 times; the first trip was on 12 September 1880 and the last trip was 25 December 1893.

== Other notes ==
Reference for the information box

A sketch of the ship from 1872 may be found at the Victorian Web
