= SS Tynwald (1866) =

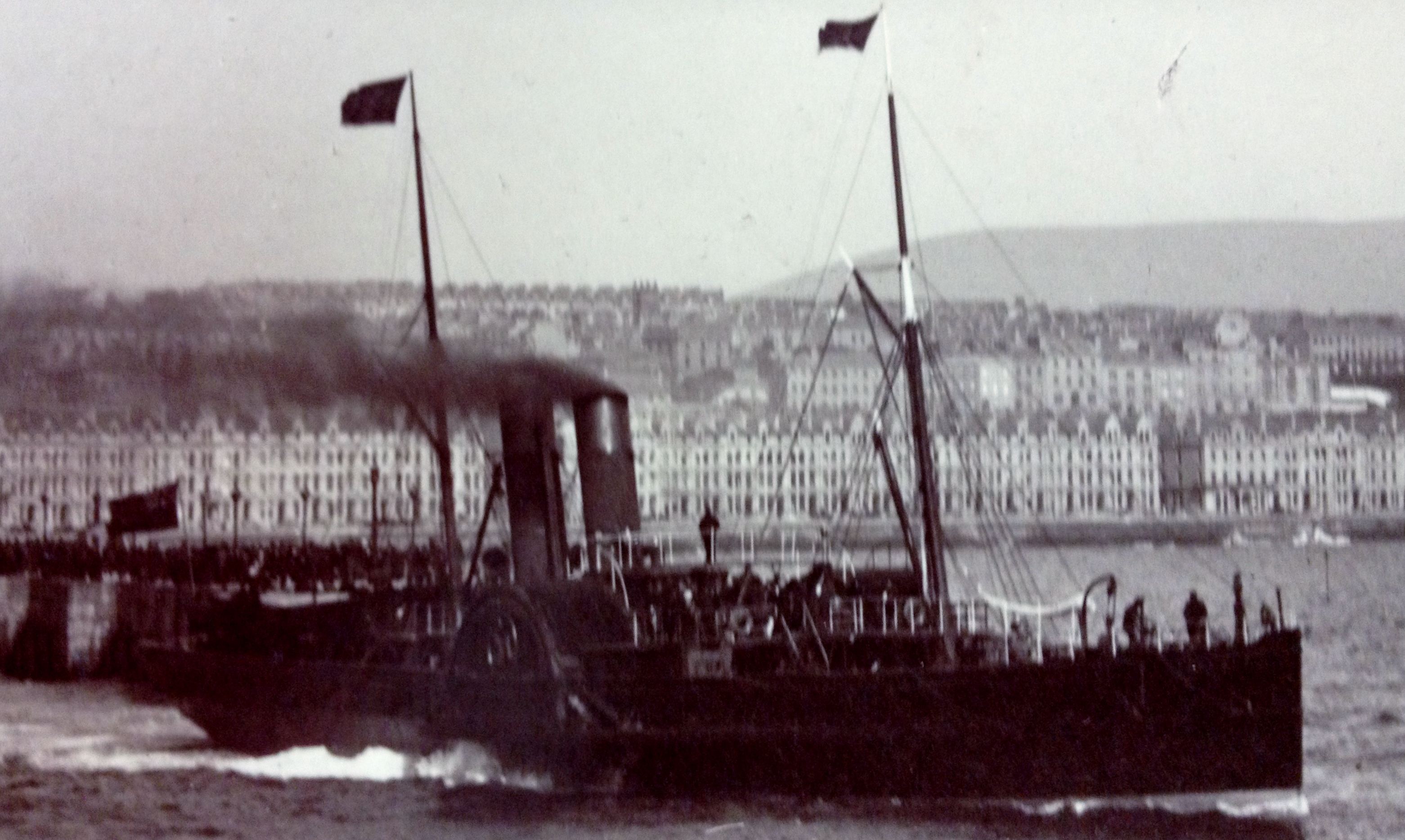
- Tynwald leaving her home port, Douglas.

History

Isle of Man
- Name: Tynwald.
- Owner: 1866-1888: Isle of Man Steam Packet Company
- Operator: 1866-1888: Isle of Man Steam Packet Company
- Port of registry: Douglas, Isle of Man
- Builder: Caird & Co., Greenock.
- Cost: £26,000
- Way number: 45474
- Launched: 17 March 1866
- Completed: 1866
- Out of service: 1888
- Identification: Official Number 45474; Code Letters H R T J
- Fate: Sold and scrapped 1888

General characteristics
- Type: Paddle Steamer
- Tonnage: 696 gross register tons (GRT)
- Length: 240 ft 0 in (73.2 m)
- Beam: 26 ft 0 in (7.9 m)
- Depth: 14 ft 0 in (4.3 m)
- Ice class: N/A
- Installed power: Not recorded.
- Propulsion: Two-cylinder oscillating engines working at 25 pounds per square inch (170 kPa), producing an indicated horsepower of approximately 1,300 shp (970 kW)
- Speed: 15 knots (28 km/h; 17 mph)

SS (RMS) Tynwald (II), No. 45474, was an iron paddle-steamer which served with the Isle of Man Steam Packet Company, and was the second vessel in the Company to bear the name.

She was the third of three sisters to come from the Greenock yards of Caird & Co., her two older siblings being Snaefell and Douglas.

== Dimensions. ==
Tynwald had a registered tonnage of 696 GRT. Length 240'; beam 26'; depth 14'. Tynwald had an operating speed of 15 knots (28 km/h; 17 mph) and her engines developed 1,300 shp (970 kW).

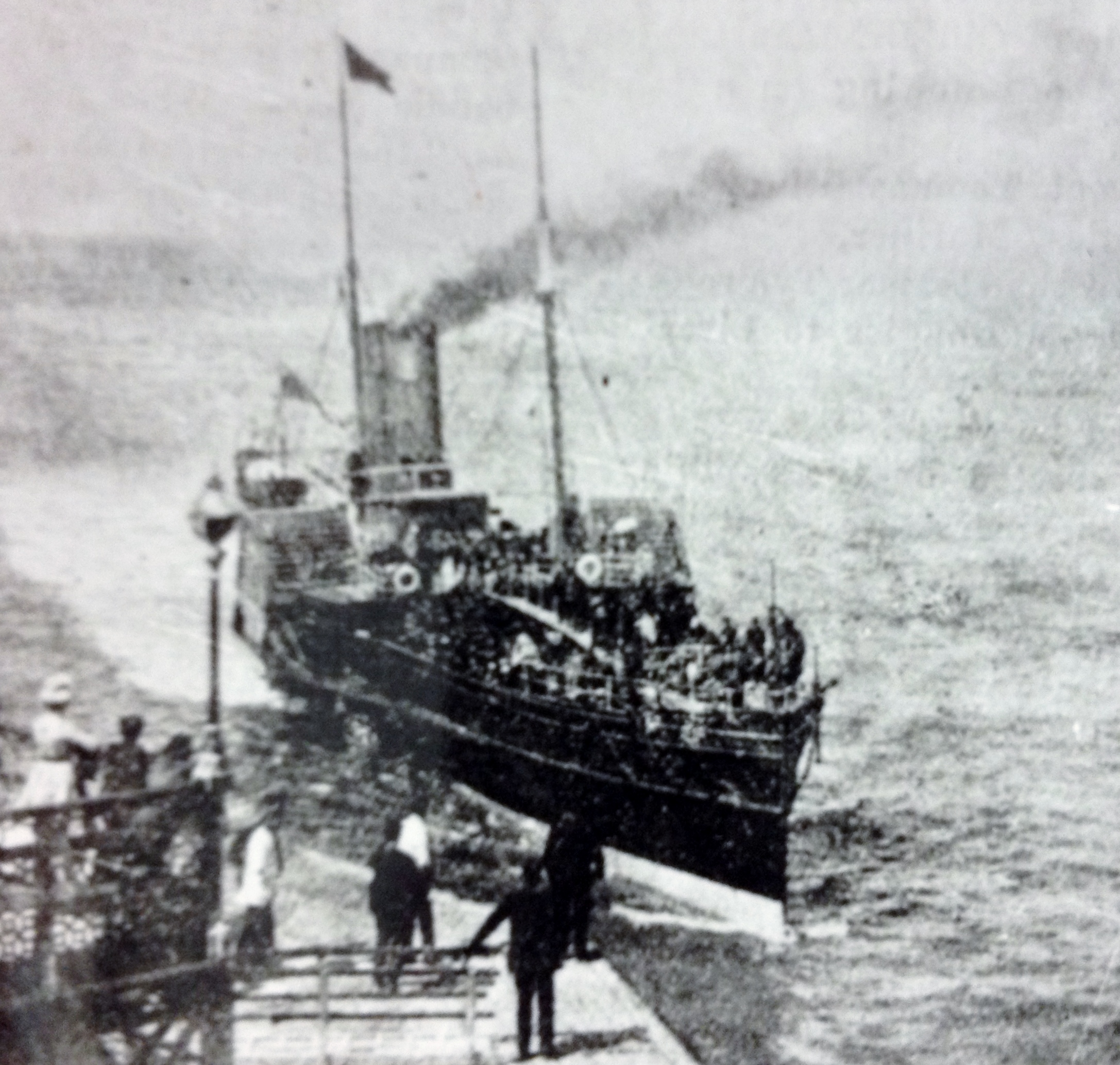
Tynwald arriving at Llandudno, 19 July 1887.

== Service life. ==
Built by Caird & Co of Greenock, and launched on Saturday 17 March 1866, Tynwald cost the Company £26,000 (equivalent to £3,042,413 in 2023). Both funnels were situated aft of the paddle boxes, with the main mast close to the after funnel.

Tynwald and her sisters were considered fast vessels. Indeed, her older sister Snaefell, is recorded as having made the passage from Douglas to Liverpool in 4hrs 20 minutes, which would suggest a speed in excess of 15 knots. On 15 June 1873, Tynwald collided with the steamship Sirius and the tug Guiding Star in the Sloyne. On 6 October 1874, she collided with the sailing ship Annie Frost in the River Mersey. On 6 December 1877, the brigantine Cerduc collided with a barque 20 nautical miles (37 km) north west of the Bar Lightship and was damaged. Tynwald answered her distress signal and towed Cerdic in to Liverpool.

In 1882 Tynwald had a thorough overhaul. She was fitted with new boilers, surface condenser and new decks, which with repairs to the engines cost £11,219 (equivalent to £1,427,272 in 2023). On 21 February 1885, she discovered the abandoned hulk Jung Frau 8 nautical miles (15 km) off Douglas and towed her in to that port. The next day she discovered Gloriosa derelict and towed her in to Douglas.

Tynwald was designed to carry a mixture of passengers and cargo. Her designation as a Royal Mail Ship (RMS) indicated that she carried mail under contract with the Royal Mail. A specified area was allocated for the storage of letters, parcels and specie (bullion, coins and other valuables). In addition, there was a considerable quantity of regular cargo, ranging from furniture to foodstuffs.

== Disposal ==
After an uneventful career, Tynwald was disposed of in 1888.

Both Tynwald and her older sister Douglas were sold at auction, and raised the combined sum of £26,644 (equivalent to £3,748,910 in 2023).

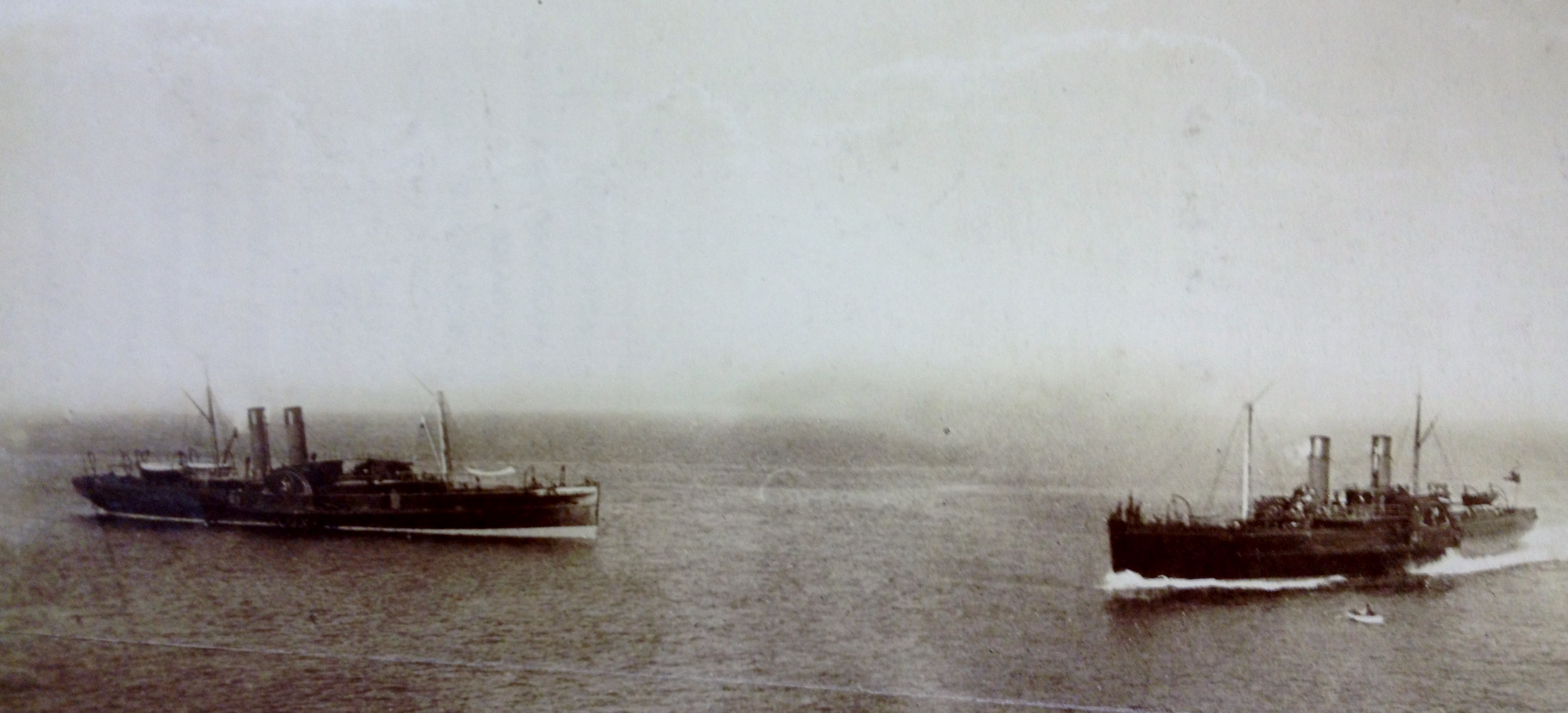
Tynwald (left) & Douglas (right) pictured in Douglas Bay

== Official number and code letters ==
Official numbers are issued by individual flag states. They should not be confused with IMO ship identification numbers. Tynwald had the UK Official Number 45474 and used the Code Letters H R T J.
