= SS Snaefell (1863) =

Paddle steamer

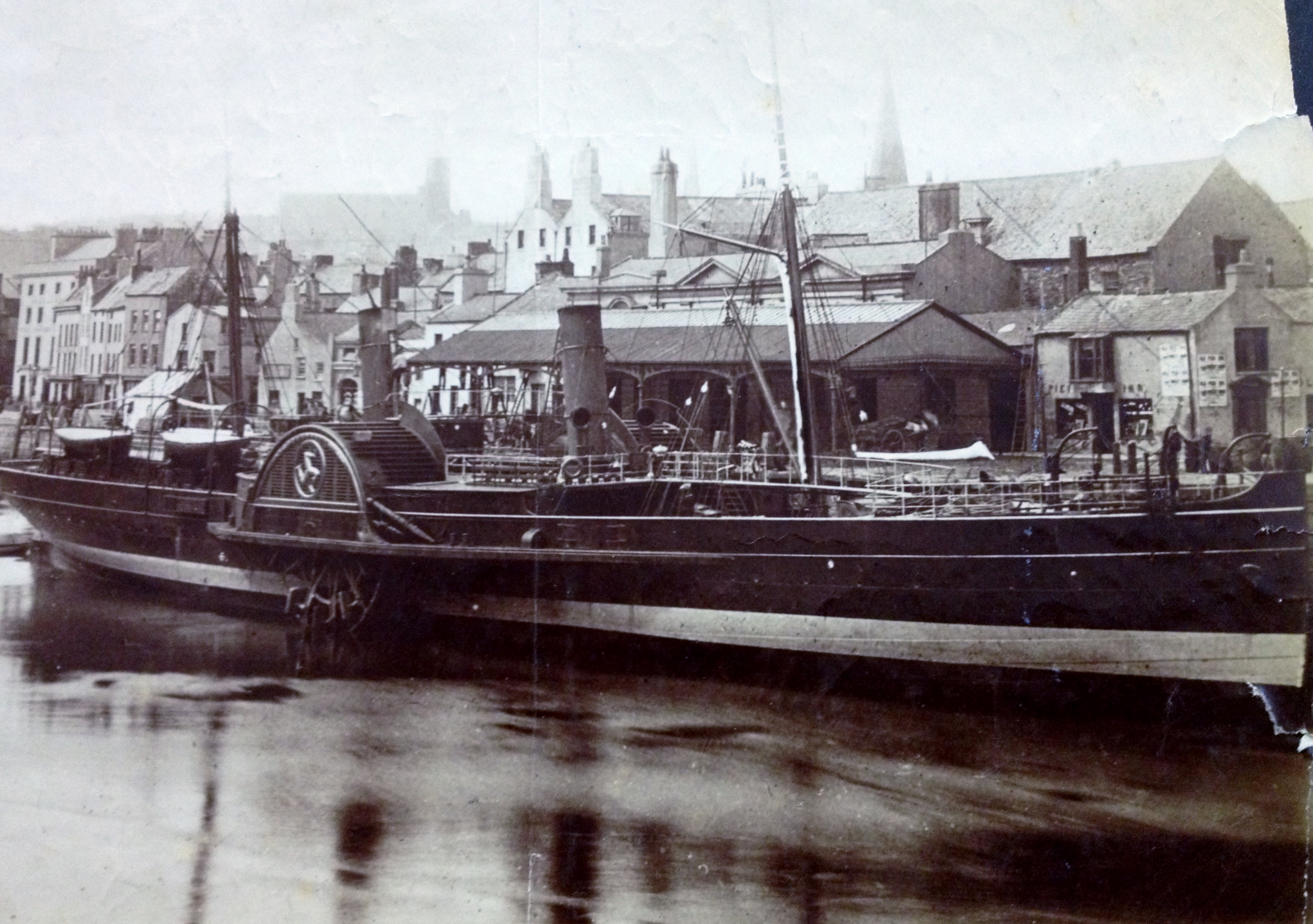
- Snaefell pictured berthed in Douglas.

History
- Name: Snaefell
- Namesake: Snaefell
- Owner: 1863–1875: IOMSPCo. 1875–1888: Royal Netherlands Steamship Company.
- Operator: 1863–1875: IOMSPCo. 1875–1888: Royal Netherlands Steamship Company.
- Port of registry: Douglas, Isle of Man
- Builder: Caird & Co. Greenock
- Cost: £22,000
- Yard number: 45468
- Launched: 22 May 1863
- Completed: 1863
- In service: 1863
- Out of service: 1875
- Identification: Official Number 45468; Code Letters V D L F
- Fate: Sold to Royal Netherlands Steamship Company in 1875. Finally sold for scrap in 1888.

General characteristics
- Type: Paddle steamer
- Tonnage: 700 gross register tons (GRT)
- Length: 236 feet (72 m)
- Beam: 26 feet (7.9 m)
- Depth: 14 feet (4.3 m)
- Ice class: N/A
- Installed power: 1,300 shp (970 kW)
- Propulsion: Two-cylinder oscillating engines working at 25 pounds per square inch (170 kPa), producing an indicated horsepower of approximately 1,300 shp (970 kW)
- Speed: 15 knots (28 km/h; 17 mph)

SS (RMS) Snaefell (I) – the first ship in the Company's history to bear the name – was an iron paddle steamer that served with the Isle of Man Steam Packet Company until she was sold in 1875.

== Construction and dimensions ==
Snaefell was the first of three similar vessels to be built for the Company by Caird & Co. of Greenock. Costing £22,000, she entered service in 1863.

Length 236'; beam 26'; depth 14'. Snaefell had a registered tonnage of 700 GRT.

All three sisters – Snaefell, Douglas and Tynwald were driven by two-cylinder oscillating engines with in the case of Snaefell, a nominal horsepower of 240, producing an indicated horsepower of approximately 1,300.

Snaefell was reboilered in 1869 for £3,500 (equivalent to £360,199 in 2025).

== Service life ==
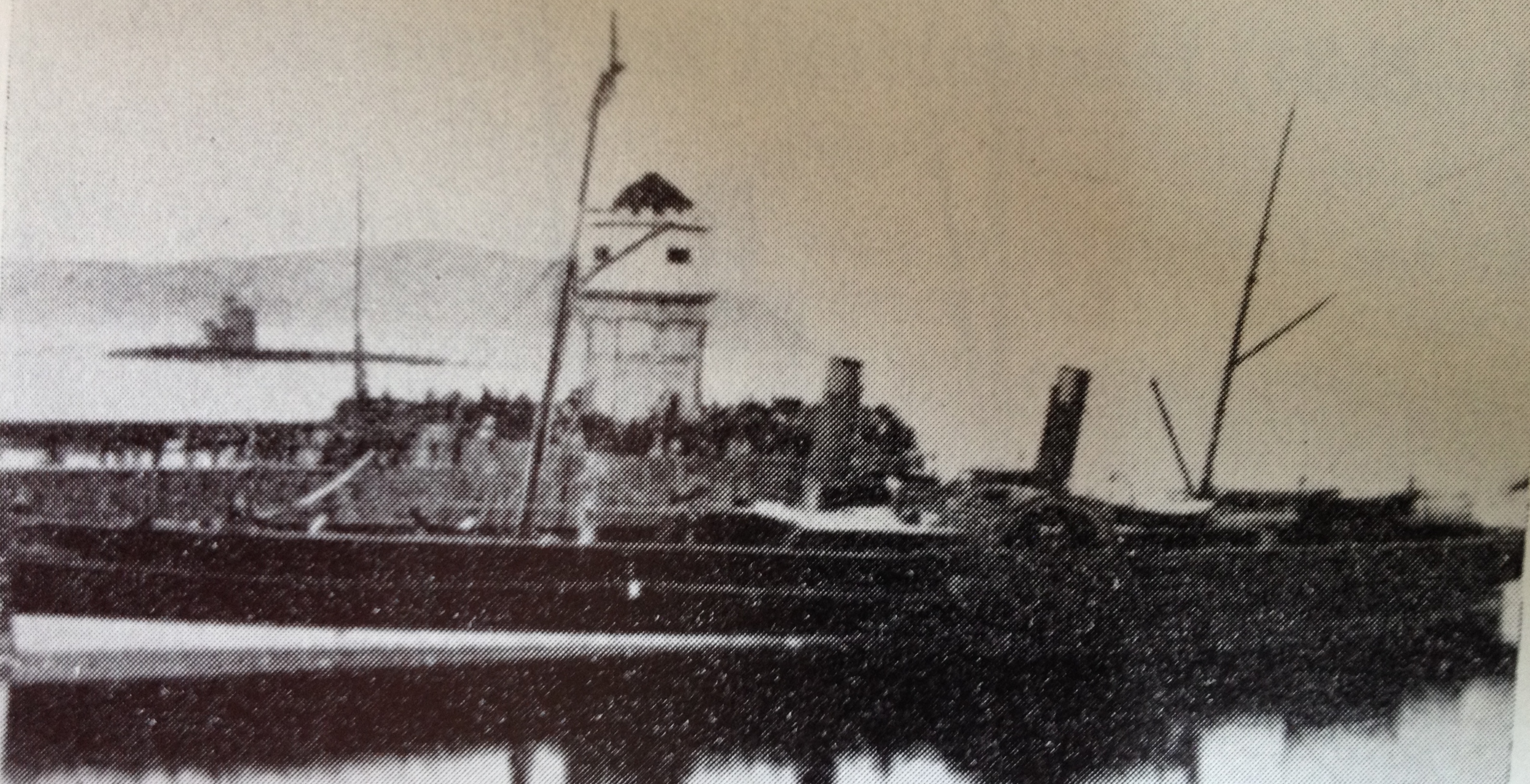
Snaefell pictured berthed at the Red Pier, Douglas.

Snaefell was considered fast for her day, and had a service speed of 15 knots (28 km/h; 17 mph). She reduced the passage time from Douglas – Liverpool to 4hrs 20mins, suggesting a service speed of approximately 17 knots (31 km/h; 20 mph).

On 19 September 1863, Snaefell collided with the Mersey Flat Mary Agnes at Liverpool. Mary Agnes sank with the loss of two lives. Survivors were rescued by HMS Warrior. On 20 October 1864, she collided with the steamship Hibernia at Liverpool whilst bound for Douglas. Severely damaged and flooded at the bows, she put back to Liverpool.

She ran aground at Liverpool on 22 June 1871, after which her Master, Capt. Corlett tendered his resignation. The Company's shareholders asked the board to reappoint him, but after much discussion the board declined. Capt. Thomas Lewis was given command at a salary of £225 (equivalent to £22,914 in 2025) a year, reduced to half pay during lay up.

== Disposal ==
After only 12 years with the Manx fleet, Snaefell was put up for sale. She was sold to the Royal Netherlands Steamship Company of Amsterdam for £15,500 (equivalent to £1,546,336 in 2025) in 1875. She was renamed the Stad Breda and plied between Sheerness and Flushing. In 1888, she was sold for scrapping.
