= Coat of arms of Hamburg =

Versions
- Middle coat of arms of Hamburg

- Lesser coat of arms of Hamburg

- Admiralty coat of arms of Hamburg
- Armiger: Free and Hanseatic City of Hamburg
- Crest: Three peacock feathers and six banners of the arms and a mantling Argent and Gules.
- Shield: Gules, a castle triple-turreted Argent.
- Supporters: Two Lions rampant reguardant Or, langued Gules.
- Compartment: A postament Or
- Other elements: A cross Argent atop the central turret, a six-rayed mullet Argent above each outer turret.
- Use: The greater arms may only be used by the government of Hamburg.

The coat of arms of Hamburg, along with the flag of Hamburg, is regulated by the constitution of Hamburg and law. The colors of Hamburg are white and red. One of the oldest versions of the castle is found on a seal in 1241.

== Description ==
All coat of arms show a castle with three towers. The middle tower shows a cross on top. It is believed that the so-called Marian stars on top of the two side-towers and the cross recalls the fact that Hamburg used to be an archbishopric. The towers and the walls with their pinnacles and the closed gate symbolized the determination of the town to defend itself.

=== Greater Coat of Arms ===
The Greater Coat of Arms shows the castle, the stars and the church in silver on red ground with two lions standing on a compartment. The top is like the middle coat of arms with a helmet with crest including three peacock feathers and six banners of the arms and a mantling. This coat of arms is protected and only allowed to be used by the Senat and the Diet of Hamburg.

=== Admiralty Coat of Arms of Hamburg ===
The Admiralty Coat of Arms of Hamburg is used for official ships of Hamburg.

== History ==
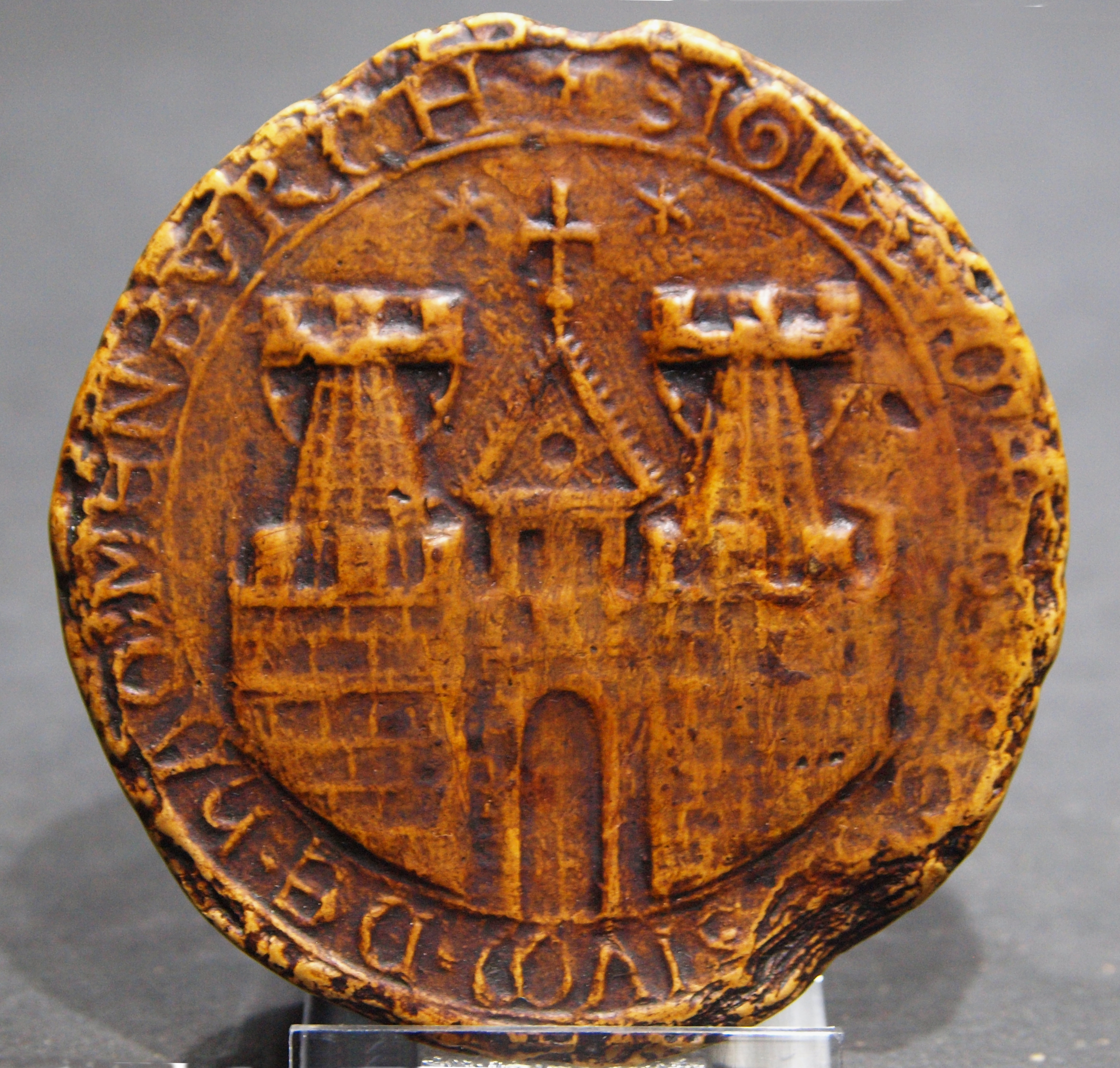
First known seal of 1241 (Replica)

The oldest coat of arms of Hamburg has been retained on city seals of the 12th and 13th centuries. During the centuries the towers, walls, pinnacles and symbols of the coat of arms of Hamburg changed several times, without changing in character. The central castle was shown with opened doors sometimes with closed doors and with a portcullis.

The third known seal is attached to a document dated 15 March 1264, in which the Council of Hamburg grants the merchants of Hanover free passage to and from Hanover for trading purposes. This restored seal is deposited in the Stadtarchiv Hannover.

The colors of version of the lesser arms of 2008 are declared by an act of law of the Senate of Hamburg on 14 May 1752. Before the tincture was a red castle on white ground. Since 1952, the coat of arms and the flags are regulated by the constitution of Hamburg. The colors of Hamburg are white and red. In general the use of city seals with the coat of arms was a privilege of the City Council. The city elders had to watch its maintenance. Even now the coat of arms is protected and can only be used under specific circumstances.

Older Coat of Arms of Hamburg

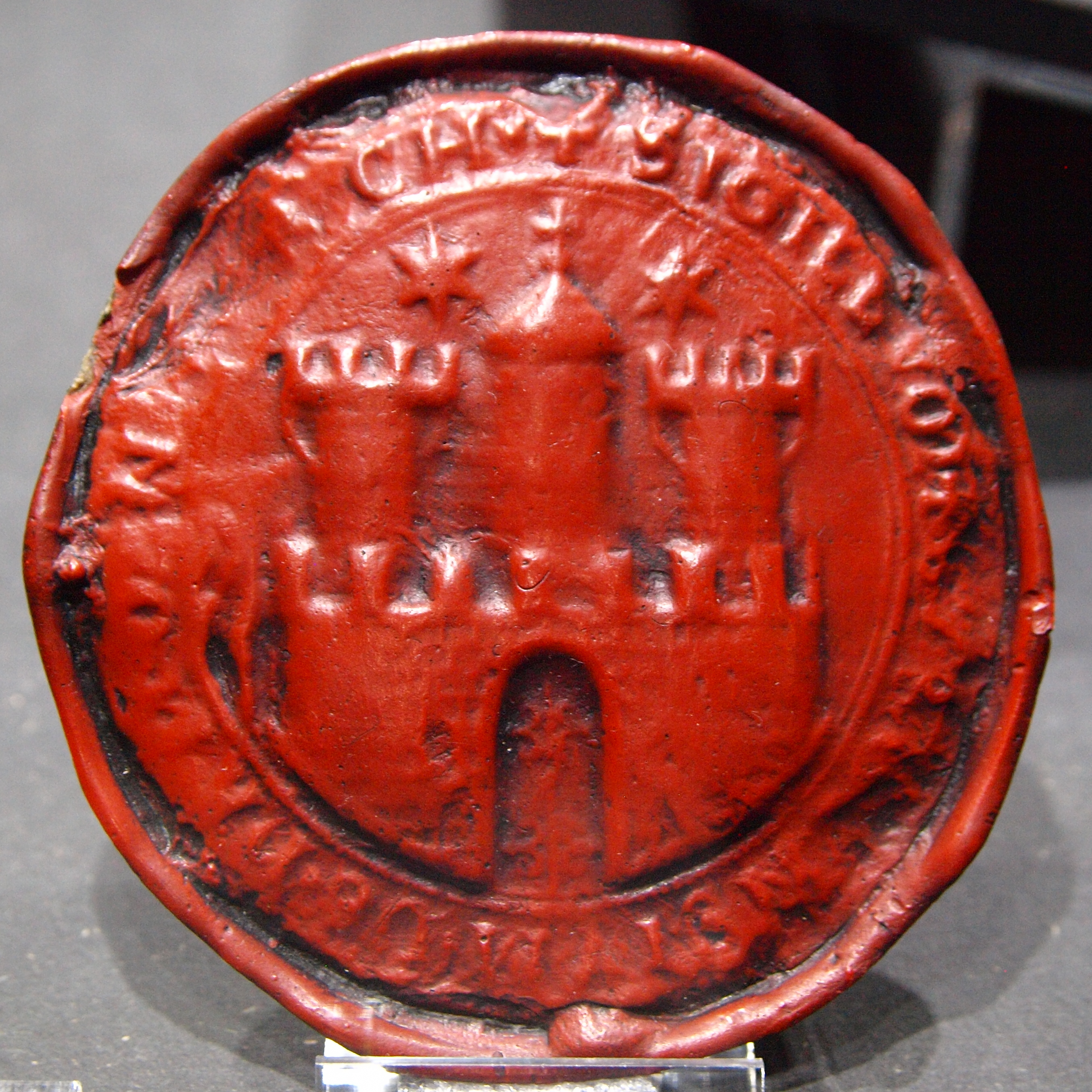
Second known seal of 1253/55 (Replica)

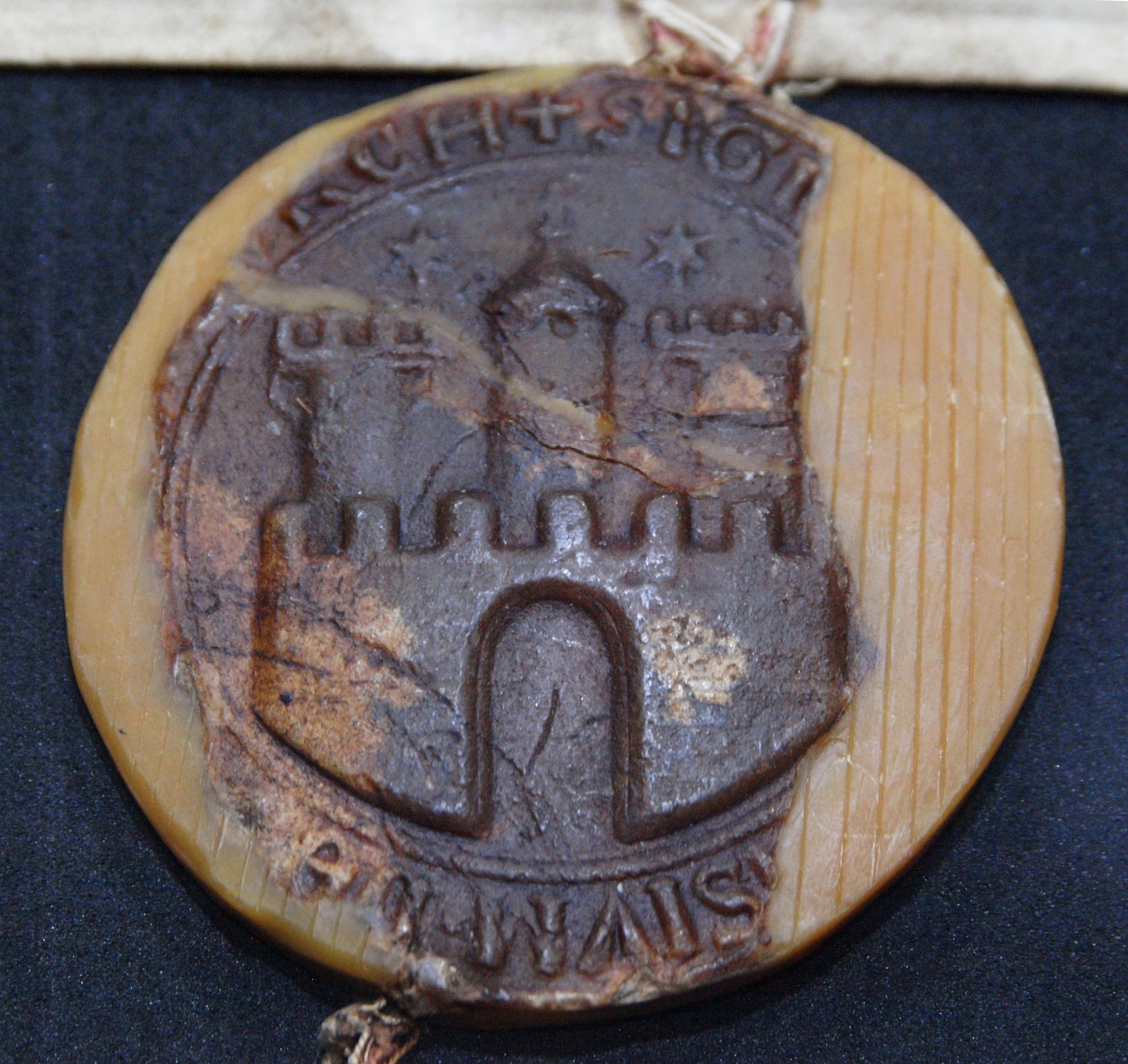
Third known seal of 1264

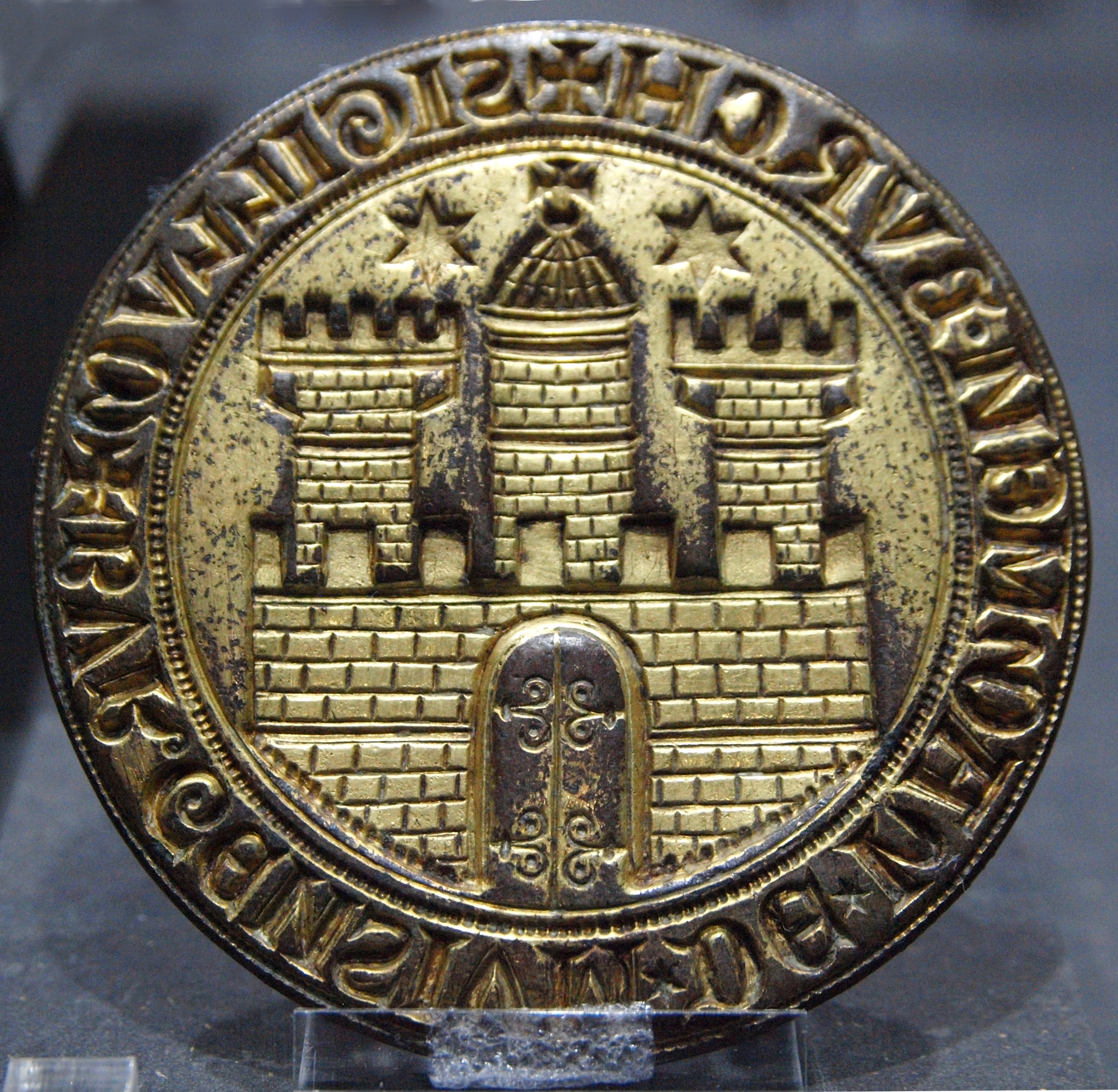
Fourth known seal of 1304

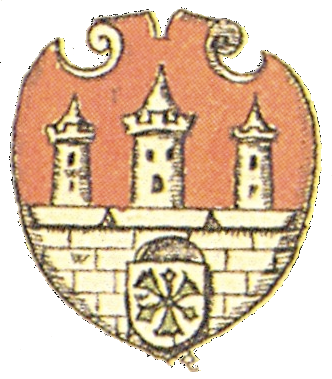
Free imperial city
1605 (Johann Siebmacher)

Free imperial city
of the German Empire
1871 - 1918

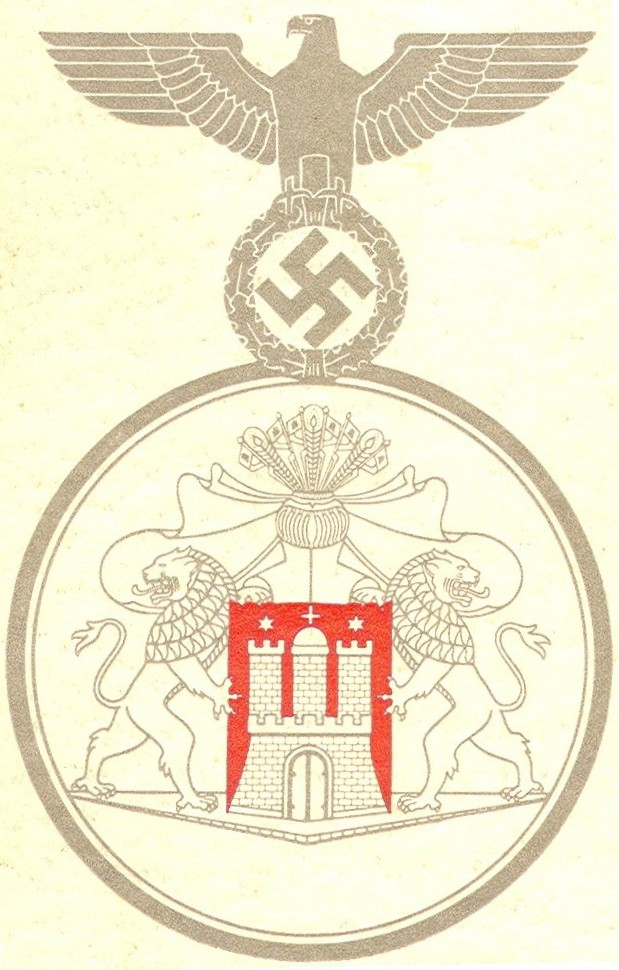
Nazi Germany
1933 - 1945

=== Greater Coat of Arms ===
The coat of arms has existed since the 16th century.

=== Admiralty Coat of Arms of Hamburg ===
In 1623, a Admiralitätskollegium (lit. admiralty council) was established to oversee the law of sea and the security of shipping, as a port authority. The coat of arms exists since 1642. In 1811, abandoned during the French occupation, the admiralty council was officially disestablished in 1814, and succeeded as a court instance by the Handelsgericht (trade court) and for administrative purposes by the port and shipping deputation (German title: Schifffahrts- und Hafendeputation).

== See also ==
- Armorial of Hamburg
- Coat of arms of Prussia
- Origin of the coats of arms of German federal states.
