= Bristol General Steam Navigation Company =

Shipping Company

- House flag
- Industry: Shipping
- Founded: 1821
- Defunct: 1980
- Headquarters: Bristol
- Area served: Bristol, Cork, Dublin, Waterford

The Bristol General Steam Navigation Company provided shipping services between Bristol and ports in southern Ireland, principally Cork from 1821 to 1980. There were also services to other destinations, including ports in southern England, south Wales, and France.

== History ==
The company was founded in 1821 by eight Bristol merchants as the War Office Steam Packet Company which started services in April 1822 to Ireland to carry out a War Office contract to transport troops, recruits and convicts.

In 1827, when the War Office contract expired, it became the General Steam Packet Company. In 1834 the name became Bristol Steam Packet Company and in 1836 it was incorporated as The Bristol General Steam Navigation Company. In 1877 the business was sold to Sir John Arnott and a new company was formed as The Bristol Steam Navigation Company Limited ("General" may have been omitted because it could be confused with their direct competitor on services with continental Europe, the London-based General Steam Navigation Company).

Charles Shaw Lovell established his shipping agency business in London in 1869. His involvement with Bristol Steam began in earnest in 1896, when the company acquired his shares in the Gloucester Steamship Company in exchange for almost 25% of the ordinary capital of the company. Lovell brought to the table a commission from the Great Western Railway on shipments made over their lines, which continued until the nationalisation of GWR in 1947. Charles Lovell's son, Egerton, became a director of Bristol Steam in 1901-2 whilst in his twenties.

Originally offering passenger and freight services between Bristol and a range of ports in Southern England, Wales and Ireland, passenger services were terminated in 1908 because of competition from the Great Western Railway at Fishguard.

== Closure ==
Freight services, trading as "Bristol Seaway" from 1973, continued until 1980.

== Archives ==
Records of Bristol General Steam Navigation Company are held at Bristol Archives (Ref. 39458) (online catalogue 1) and (Ref. 40621) (online catalogue 2).

== Accidents and incidents ==
On 21 January 1888 the 1871-built iron screw steamer Constance, which was from Rotterdam bound for Plymouth then Bristol, ran ashore outside Plymouth harbour in fog. The ship sank with the loss of three crew members.

The Calypso was an 1865-built screw steamer which was on a voyage from Antwerp to Gloucester in November 1890. Because of the bad weather it sheltered in the lee of the shore of Dungeness and was anchored with a number of other ships during the night. In the morning the Calypso was hit by the Spanish steamer Pinzon, damaged she was beached at Dungeness. The tug Zeelander then towed the Calpyso stern first in an attempt to take her to Dover. They soon got into trouble and the Sandgate lifeboat was called to remove the crew just before the vessel sank.

On 7 April 1899 the newly built Cato was on her second voyage from Cardiff to Hamburg encountered bad weather on the north coast of Cornwall. The ship sank and eight lives were lost and the Board of Trade held an inquiry, the inquiry cleared the master of any wrongful act.

In February 1916 the steamer Argo sank with the loss of one life.

In March 1923 the Echo was bound to Bristol from Hamburg when it hit the Portuguese ship Coimbra in the fog and sunk.

In May 1937 the steamer Alecto sank with the loss of ten lives. The Alecto which had left Swansea for Rotterdam hit the Yugoslav steamer Plavnik during the night in fog. The Plavnik rescued three men from the sea but a further ten were missing.

On 24 April 1963, the Cato was tied up alongside at Avonmouth when she was rammed by the Ellerman Line's City of Brooklyn. The Cato sank at her moorings, but was later raised, and broken up in Newport.
