= SS Hammonia =

Hammonia was the name of a number of ships.

Hamburg Amerika Linie

- SS Hammonia (1854)
- SS Hammonia (1867)
- SS Hammonia (1881)
- SS Hammonia (1905)

(also MV Hammonia (1965))

Bauermann & Metzendorf

- SS Hammonia (1941)
