= Flag of Hamburg =

Official flag of the German state of Hamburg

Hamburg
- Hamburgfahne; Landesflagge
- Use: Civil and state flag, civil and state ensign
- Proportion: 3:5
- Adopted: 1834
- Design: A red flag with the lesser coat of arms.
- Hamburgische Staatsflagge
- Use: State flag
- Proportion: 3:5
- Adopted: 1897
- Design: A red flag with the greater coat of arms.
- Admiralitätsflagge
- Use: Jack
- Proportion: 3:5
- Adopted: 1642

There are three flags of Hamburg, Germany. The Landesflagge (civil flag), the State flag of Hamburg (Staatsflagge) and the admiralty flag (Admiralitätsflagge) consist of the coat of arms of Hamburg on a red flag.

== Overview ==
The civil flag shows a white castle with three towers on red background, which is used as a civil flag as a state flag for most purposes. (It was historically used as civil ensign as well.) The oldest seal with the castle is thought to date from 1241. The first flag featuring the current form was in the mid-16th century, although this was most probably a red field, a white escutcheon and red castle. After about 1623, the escutcheon began to be omitted, leaving a red castle on white or a white castle on red. It was only in 1751 that the white castle on red was decreed as the flag of Hamburg.

The civil flag is free for use to everybody. The state flag of Hamburg is only used by the Senate of Hamburg as the head of state. This flag was created in 1897 on the occasion of the opening of the new town hall. The Admiralty flag of Hamburg is used only for state buildings connected to the navigation and at the jacks of boats of Hamburg's Water Constabulary, since there are no genuine warships under city command anymore. It portrays the admiralty coat of arms which have existed since 1642.

== Flags of boroughs in Hamburg ==
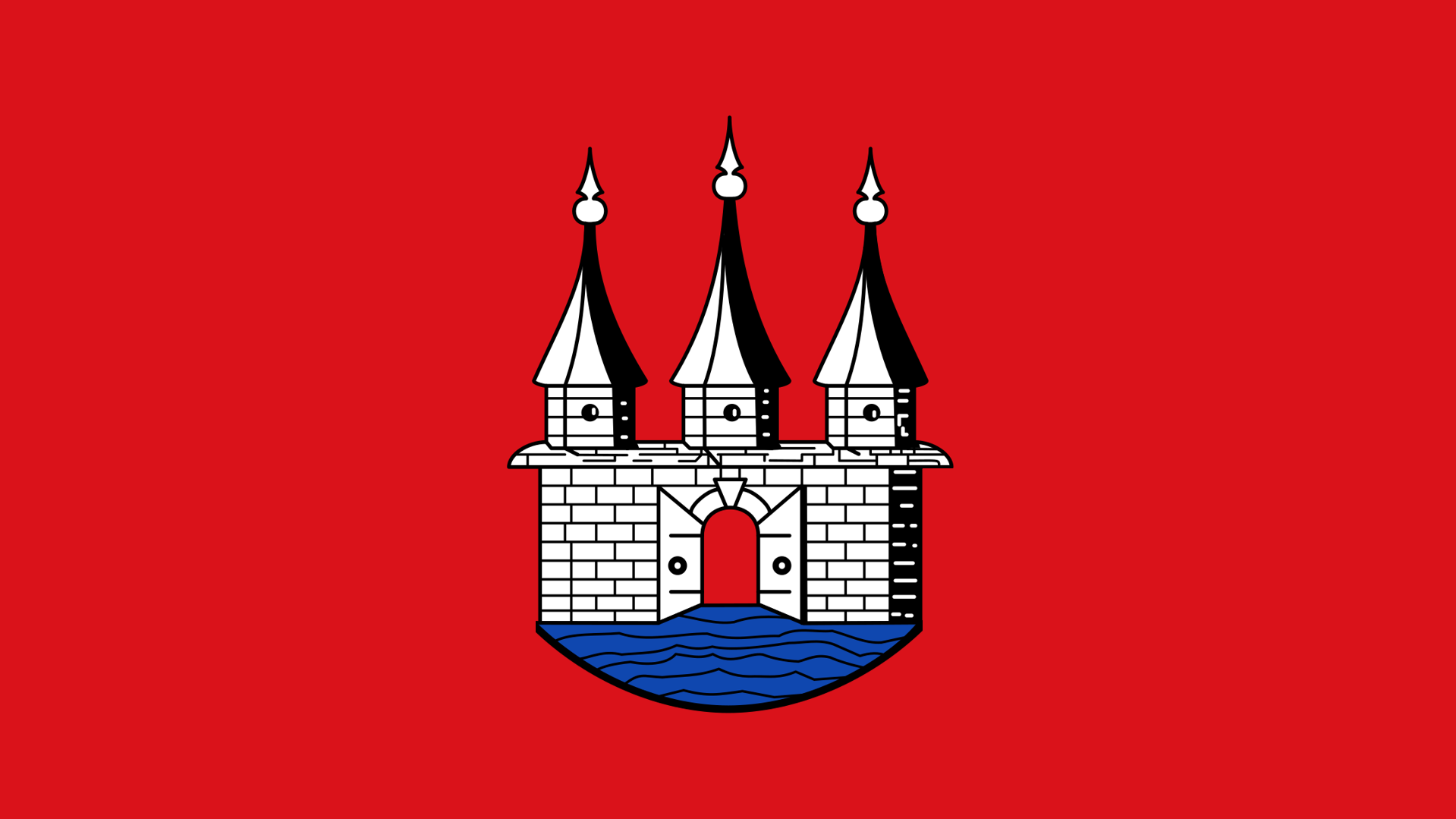
Altona

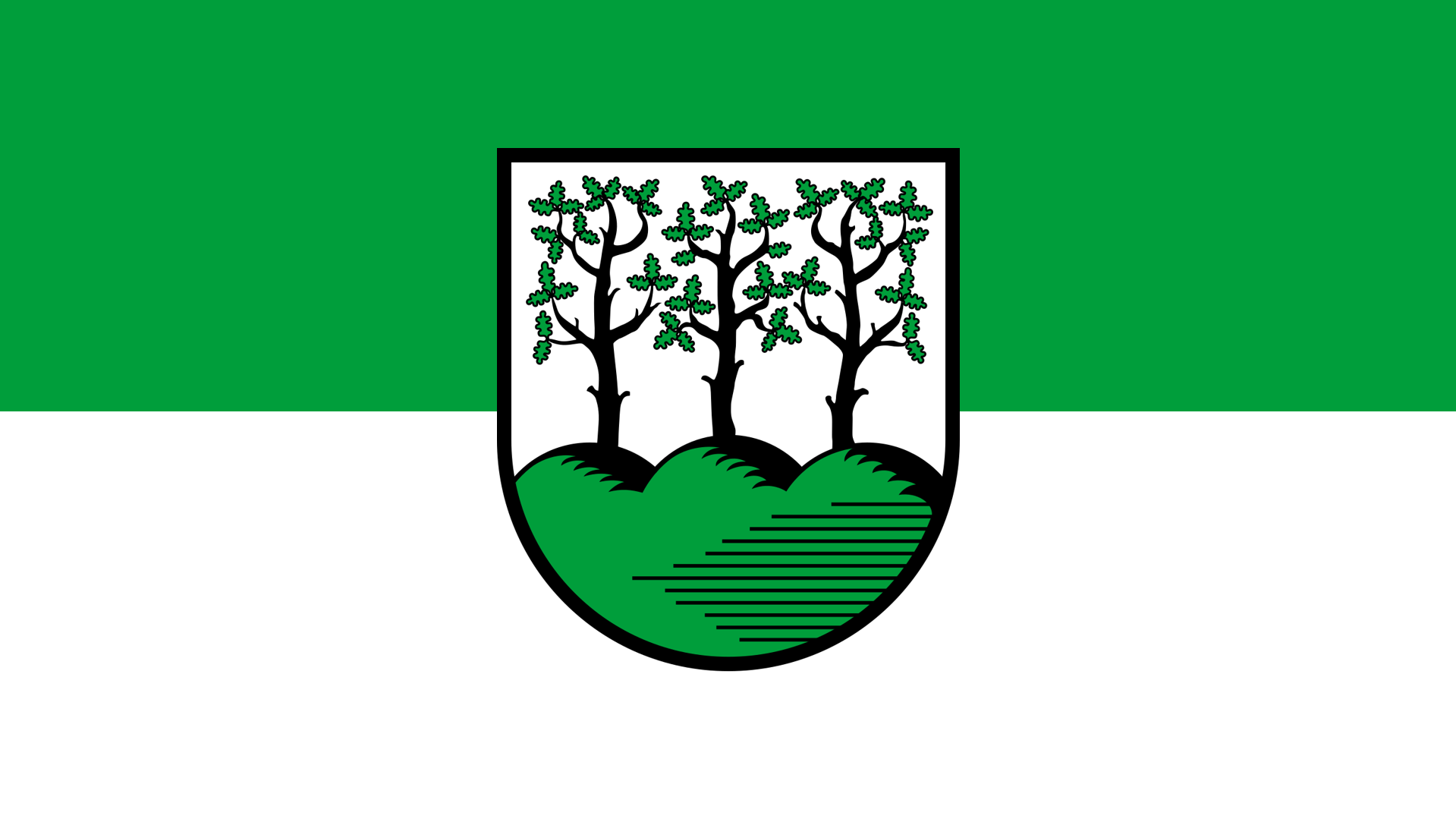
Bergedorf

Eimsbüttel

Hamburg-Mitte

Hamburg-Nord

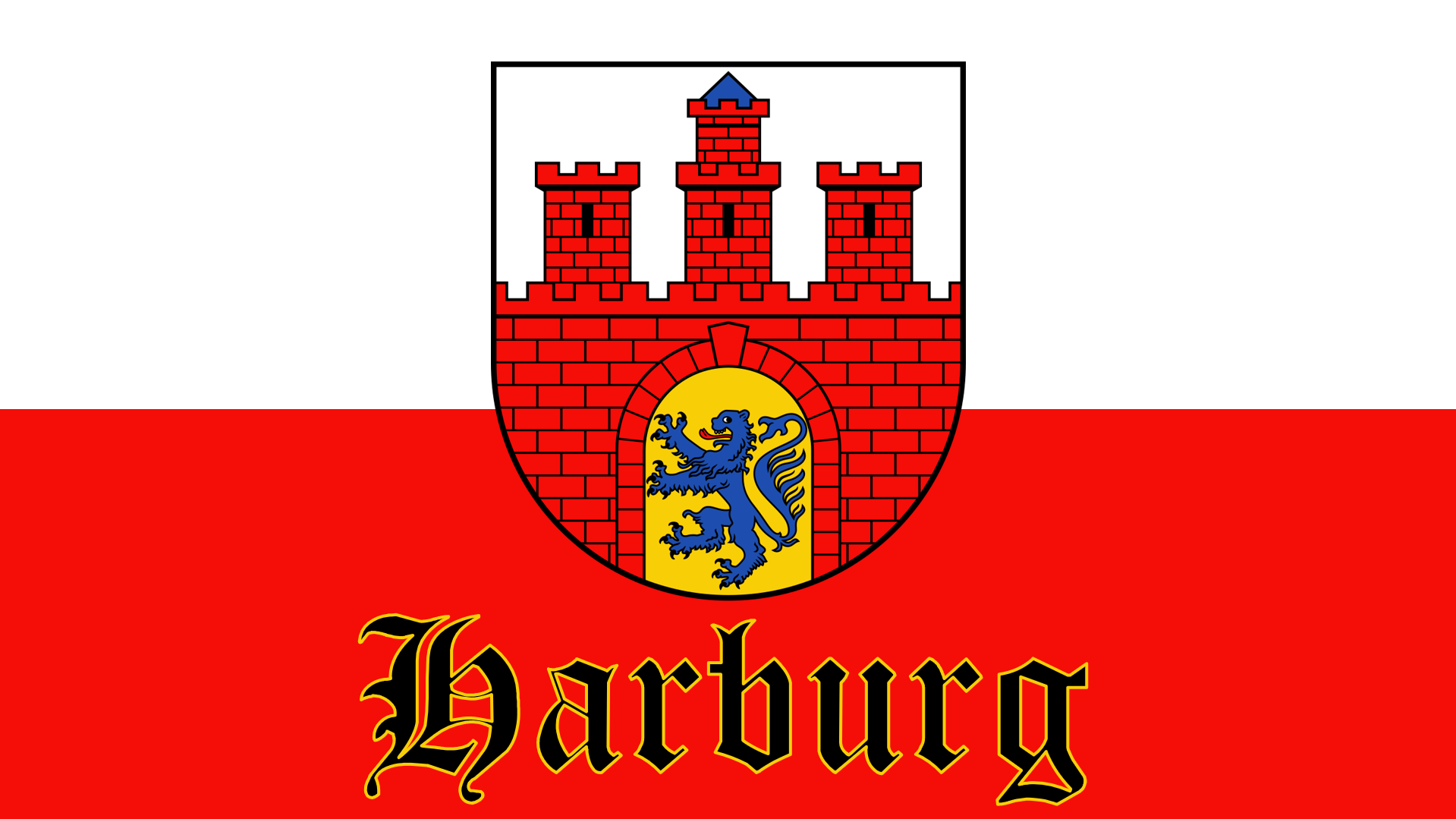
Harburg

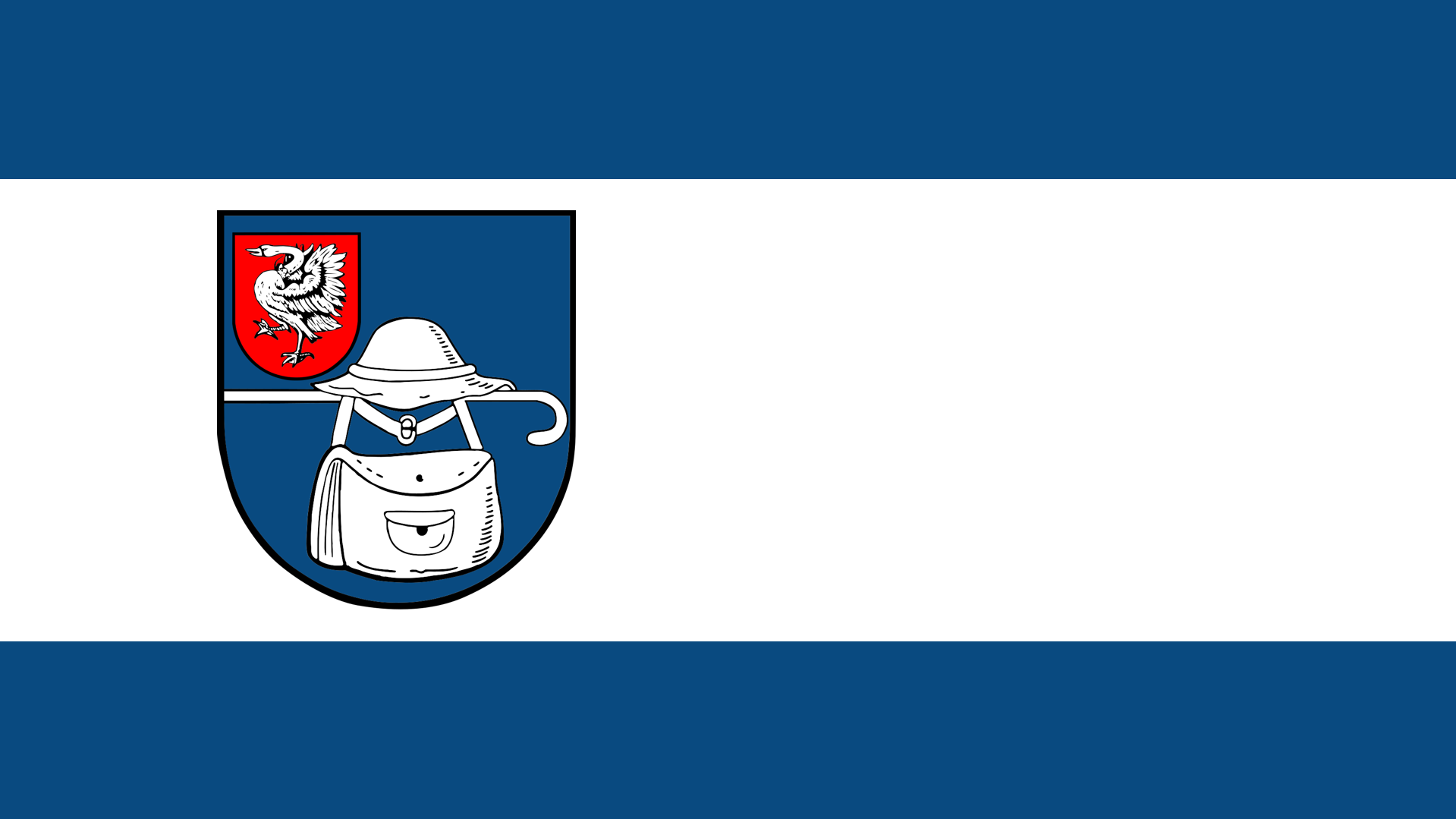
Wandsbek

== See also ==
- Coat of arms of Hamburg
- Flags of German states
