= James Teare =

Manx merchant navy officer (1872–1909)

Captain James Teare
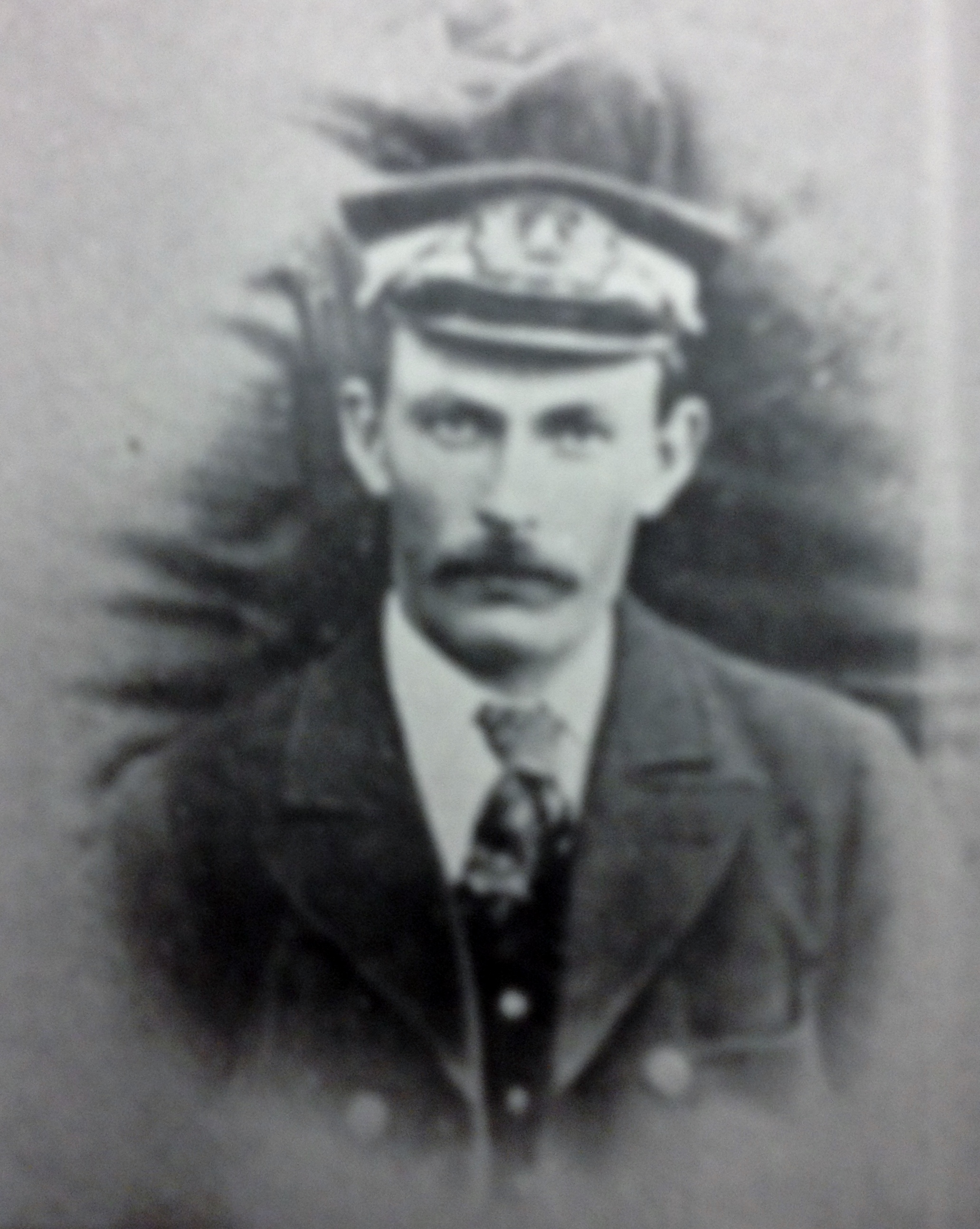
- Born: 6 August 1872; Peel, Isle of Man
- Died: 3 December 1909 (aged 37); Liverpool Bay
- Cause of death: Drowned as a result of the foundering of the RMS Ellan Vannin; body washed ashore on Ainsdale Beach, January 1910
- Occupation: Ship captain
- Employer: Isle of Man Steam Packet Company
- Known for: Captain of RMS Ellan Vannin.
- Spouse: Niobe Cowley
- Children: James (Jim) Teare, Douglas Cowley Teare, Edith May Teare, Alfred Bertram Teare
- Parent(s): Thomas Teare, Margaret Teare

James Teare (6 August 1872 – 3 December 1909) was a Manx merchant navy officer who served as a seaman and later as an officer on numerous Isle of Man Steam Packet Company vessels. Capt. Teare is best known as the Master of the RMS Ellan Vannin on her ill-fated voyage from Ramsey, Isle of Man to Liverpool on 3 December 1909.

== Life and career ==
James Teare was born in Peel, Isle of Man on 6 August 1872 and raised at St German's Place. He made his career at sea, joining the Isle of Man Steam Packet Company in 1891 as a seaman, rising through the ranks and serving on the Mona's Isle as well as various other company ships.

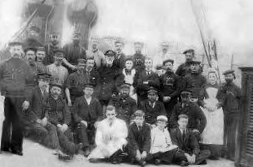
The crew of Mona's Isle (circa 1900). Second Officer James Teare can be seen seated at the far left of the photograph.

As his career progressed he served as First Officer under Capt. Hill on the Snaefell and following Capt. Hill's resignation from the company he gained his first command on the Ellan Vannin which he assumed in July 1904. This was followed in turn by him taking command of the Fenella in 1905 and the Douglas in May 1906. He then left the Isle of Man Steam Packet Company and pursued a career with an international shipping line before returning to the Isle of Man and re-joining the Steam Packet Company.

The summer of 1909 saw Capt. Teare in command of the King Orry. Following the summer season he went on shore leave and as the year closed he resumed command of the Ellan Vannin for a month's winter service, which by December 1909 was the smallest and oldest vessel in the Steam Packet Fleet.

Known for being a cautious and diligent captain as well as a lifelong teetotaler, James Teare was married with four children and lived at No 9 York Road, Douglas, Isle of Man.

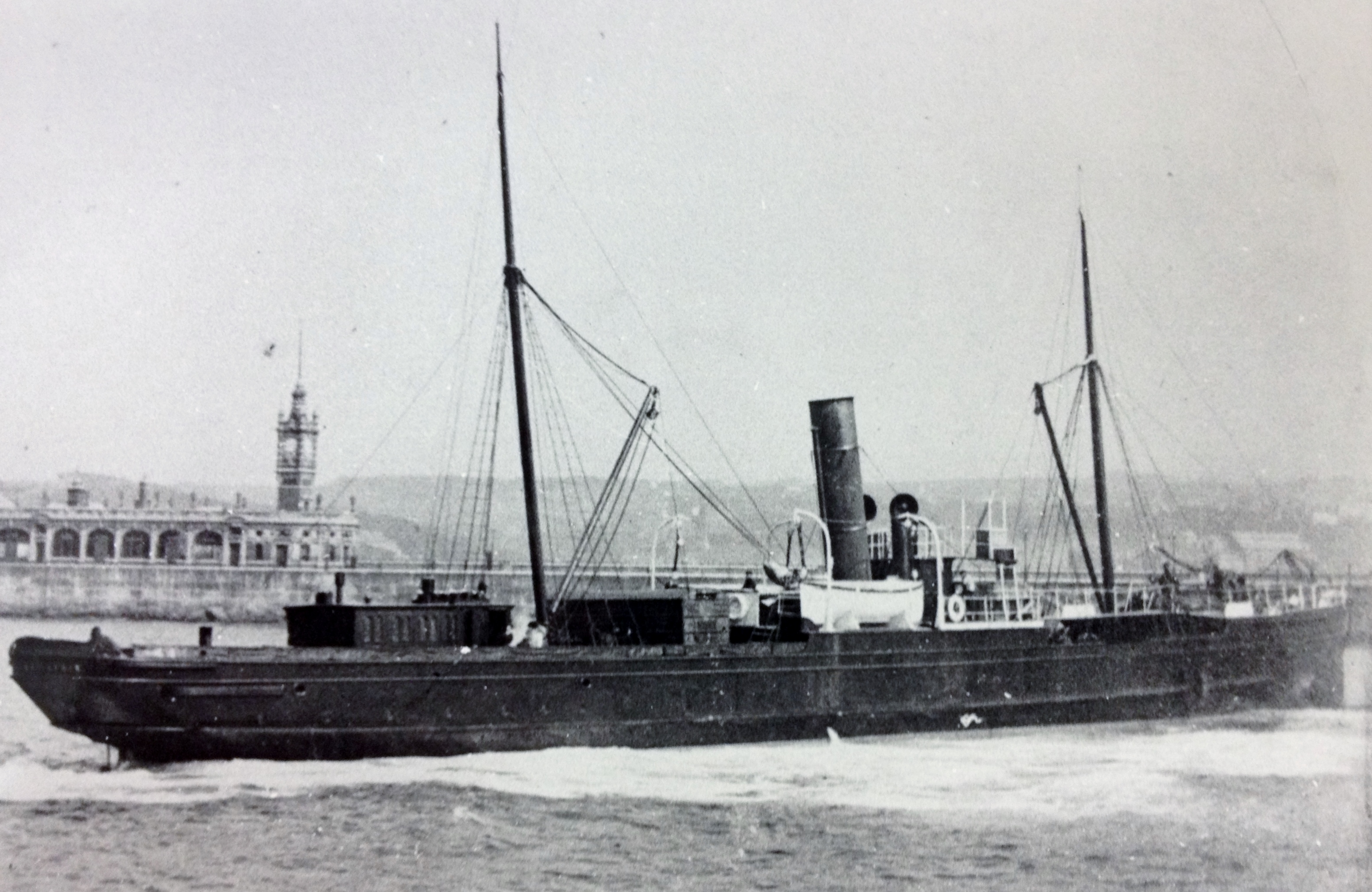
RMS Ellan Vannin pictured departing Douglas.

== Ellan Vannin disaster ==
On Friday 3 December 1909, Ellan Vannin left her home port of Ramsey at 01:13hrs, under the command of Captain Teare. Ellan Vannin was carrying 15 passengers and 21 crew as well as mail and 60 tonnes of cargo which included approximately 60 sheep. The weather on departure was moderate and although the barometric pressure was falling Captain Teare did not expect a significant deterioration in the weather. The wind direction on departure was from the northwest meaning the Ellan Vannin would have a following sea during her passage, something which would have caused her Master no particular concern. However, the weather rapidly worsened and by 06:35hrs, when the ship arrived at the Mersey Bar Lightship, the wind had risen to a Hurricane Force 12, and waves were reported to be exceeding 24 feet (7 m) in height.

A strong consensus at the time was that with a following sea the Ellan Vannin had made good progress to the Bar Lightship. Upon reaching the Bar her course would have been changed from approximately 130 degrees to 080 degrees as she entered the approach channel to the river. This would have caused her to take the sea on her port beam with the result that she got sufficiently off her course to strike a sandbank thereby causing her to founder, (a nautical term for filling with water and sinking), between the Bar lightship and the Q1 buoy sinking in the Mersey approach channel (at 53°32′0″N 3°17′0″W). It is believed she was broached by a large wave, which overwhelmed the ship. She was swept by heavy seas and filled, sinking by the stern with the loss of all passengers and crew.

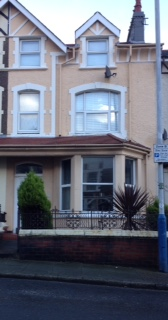
The home of Captain James Teare, York Road, Douglas, Isle of Man.

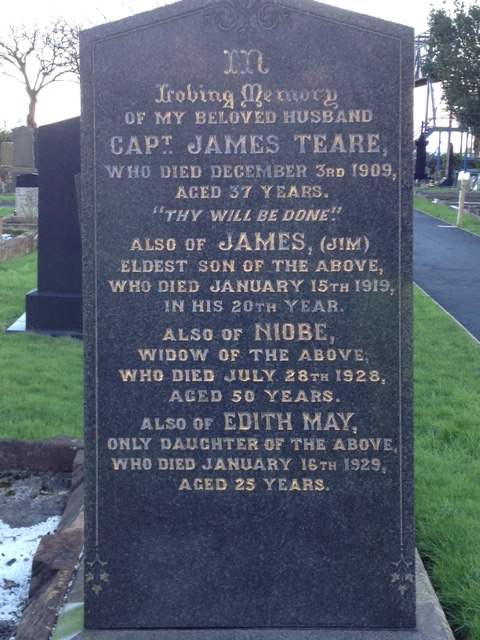
The grave of Captain James Teare, Douglas Borough Cemetery, Douglas, Isle of Man.

News of the disaster reached Douglas on the Friday evening, and the directors sat in almost continuous session until Monday. Communication was by telegram and information was difficult to ascertain. At approximately 19:00hrs a telegram was received which reported that the crew of the Formby Lightship had seen lifebuoys, bags of turnips, several dead sheep and a piano floating near the lightship. It was also reported that the crew of the lightship had picked up a mail bag which was destined for the Birkenhead Post Office and which was found to contain letters despatched from Ramsey. The following morning the company offices in Douglas received a telegram from Liverpool stating that one of the Ellan Vannin's lifeboats had been washed ashore at New Brighton with its cover on and its working gear inside. Also washed ashore were parts of the ship's bridge.

It was five days after the ship went down that the first bodies were recovered. On Monday 17 January 1910 Captain Teare's body was found washed ashore on Ainsdale beach in Southport with an inquest into his death being held on Wednesday 19 January. Also on 17 January the body of First Officer John Craine was found. It too had been washed ashore at Southport. Both bodies were subsequently returned to the Isle of Man for burial.

=== Aftermath ===
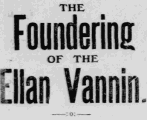
Headline in the Ramsey Courier, Saturday 10 December 1909.

The Board of Trade inquiry found that Captain Teare was not to blame for the disaster and the cause was extreme weather. The official inquiry referred to waves 24 feet (7 m) high and declared the ship to have been in good condition and fully seaworthy. After the foundering, her masts broke the surface. Divers inspecting the ship found damage to the bows and that the lifeboat davits had been swung out ready for lowering. Soon after the disaster the Mersey Docks and Harbour Board destroyed the wreck using explosives, as it was causing a hazard to shipping in the channel.

Although the Isle of Man Steam Packet Company has a tradition of reusing ship names, they have never reused the name Ellan Vannin.

A song written by Hughie Jones of The Spinners commemorates the disaster.
