= SS Ellan Vannin (1860) =

1860 UK steamship

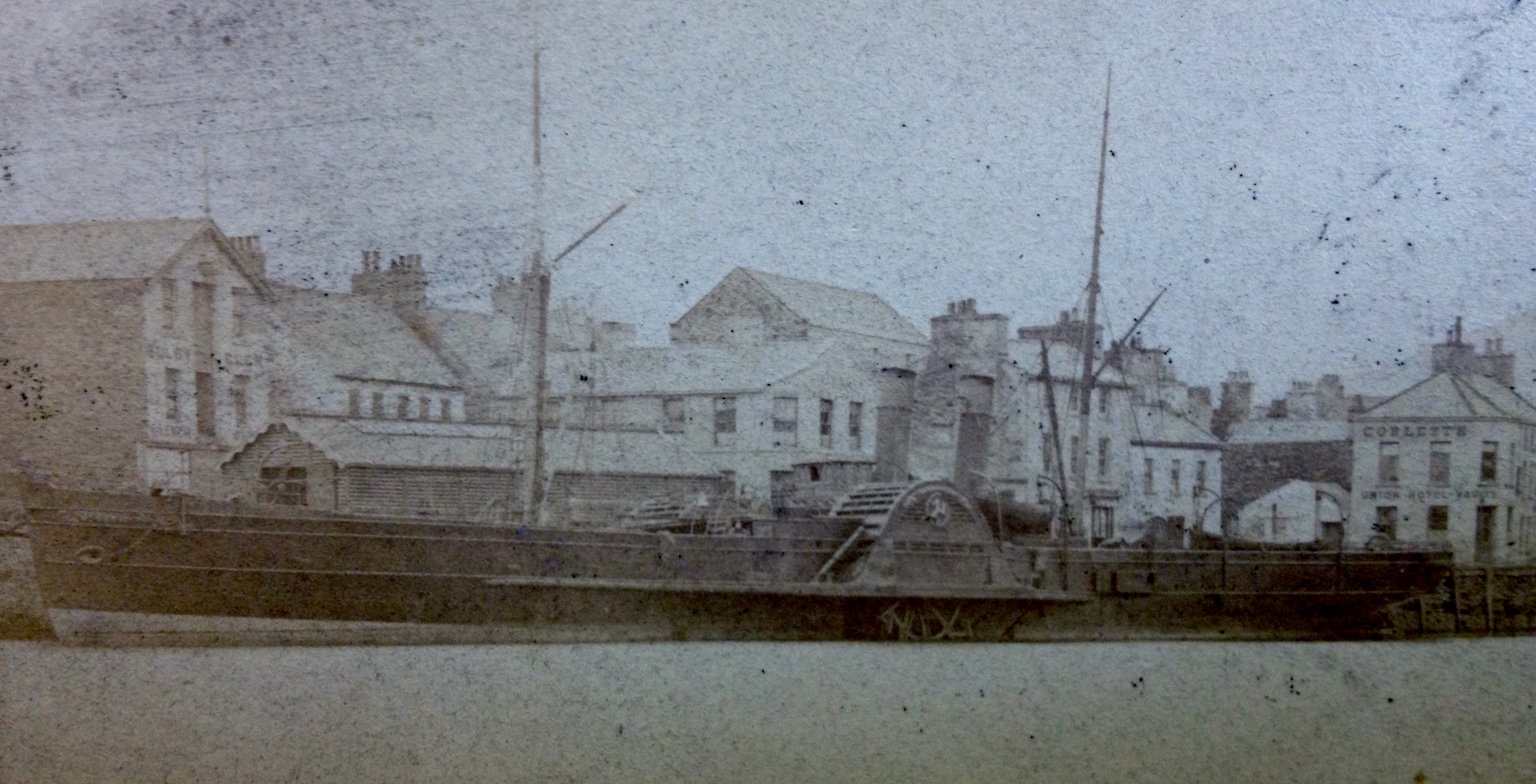
- RMS Mona's Isle at Ramsey

History

Isle of Man
- Name: Mona's Isle
- Owner: Isle of Man Steam Packet Company
- Operator: IoMSPCo
- Port of registry: Douglas
- Route: Various
- Builder: Tod & McGregor Ltd. Meadowside, Glasgow
- Cost: £10,673
- Launched: 10 April 1860
- Completed: 1860
- Reclassified: 1883
- Home port: Ramsey
- Identification: Official Number 27260.
- Fate: 1883: converted to screw-driven vessel

General characteristics as Mona's Isle
- Type: Paddle steamer
- Tonnage: 339 GRT
- Length: 198 ft 6 in (60.5 m)
- Beam: 22 ft 2 in (6.8 m)
- Depth: 10 ft 7 in (3.2 m)
- Installed power: oscillating engines, manufactured by Tod and McGregor Ltd
- Propulsion: Side paddles
- Speed: 12 knots (22 km/h; 14 mph)
- Crew: 14

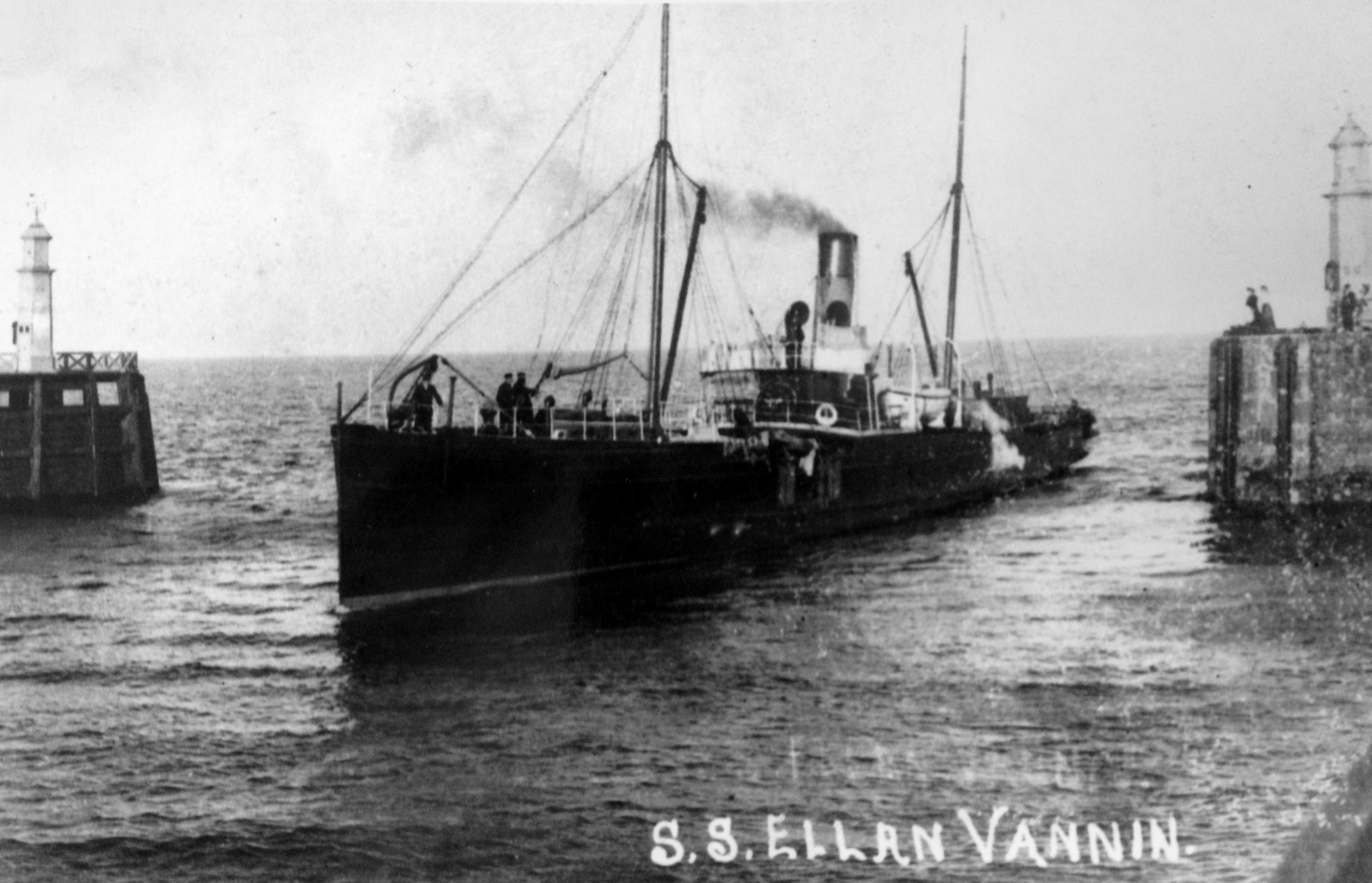
- Ellan Vannin

Isle of Man
- Name: Ellan Vannin
- Namesake: the Manx name for the Isle of Man
- Renamed: 16 November 1883
- Identification: Official Number 27260; Code Letters P Q M G
- Nickname(s): "The Li'l Daisy" "The Vannin"
- Fate: 3 December 1909: sank in a storm between the Bar Lightship and the Q1 Buoy, River Mersey 53°32′00″N 03°17′00″W

General characteristics as Ellan Vannin
- Type: Packet Steamer
- Tonnage: 375 GRT
- Installed power: two-cylinder compound steam engine made by Westray, Copeland and Co.
- Propulsion: 2 shafts; twin-screw 600 ihp (450 kW)
- Speed: 12.5 knots (23 km/h)
- Capacity: 299 passengers: 134 first class, 165 third class. Cabin capacity for 28 passengers (first class) and 25 (third class).
- Crew: 21

SS (RMS) Ellan Vannin (the Manx name for the Isle of Man) was built as an iron paddle steamer in 1860 at Meadowside, Glasgow for the Isle of Man Steam Packet Company. She was originally named Mona's Isle - the second ship in the company's history to be so named. She served for 23 years under that name before being rebuilt, re-engined and renamed in 1883. As Ellan Vannin she served for a further 26 years before being lost in a storm on 3 December 1909 in Liverpool Bay.

== Mona's Isle ==
Mona's Isle was built by Tod and McGregor Ltd, Glasgow, at a cost of £10,673. She entered service with the Isle of Man Steam Packet fleet in June 1860.

Mona's Isle is important in the history of the line, as she was the first vessel to be fitted with oscillating engines, which were also manufactured by Tod and McGregor Ltd. Until 1860 the company had always used the side-lever engines favoured by Robert Napier and Sons. The oscillating engine had advantages over the side-lever: it took less space and had fewer working parts. A further enhancement was the addition of improved feathering floats fitted to the paddle wheels.

There was no requirement for a connecting rod, and the upper end of the piston rod was fitted with a bearing which worked directly on to the crankpin. The cylinder was placed vertically under the crankshaft and could pivot through a small arc, permitting the rod to follow the movement of the crank. The plant produced 600 ihp (450 kW) which gave her a speed of approximately 12 knots.

When launched, Mona's Isle measured 339 register tons.

On the foggy morning of 5 February 1873, Mona's Isle ran aground at Ashton, Renfrewshire. She got off, undamaged, on the afternoon tide, and resumed her voyage to Glasgow from the Isle of Man. On 14 December 1878, arriving at Liverpool from Ramsey in thick fog, the ship grounded on Burbo Bank off New Brighton, but was refloated the following day. After 23 years of service, Mona's Isle was laid up at Ramsey and on 19 January 1883 was taken under tow to Barrow by the Fenella to be rebuilt.

== Ellan Vannin ==
Rebuilt in 1883, her size was increased to 375 gross register tons and her speed to 12.5 knots (23.2 km/h). She was renamed Ellan Vannin (the Manx translation for Mona's Isle) on 16 November 1883, following her conversion to a propeller-driven ship. Ellan Vannin was a twin-screw vessel driven by a two-cylinder compound steam engine made by Westray, Copeland and Co. at Barrow. Her boiler pressure was raised to 80 pounds per square inch (550 kPa).

She was capable of carrying 300 passengers and normally had a crew of 14. Ellan Vannin primarily operated out of Ramsey to Whitehaven, Liverpool and Scotland. She gave 26 years more service, and became the main mail carrier out of Ramsey. In December 1891, she completed a special overhaul at the Naval Construction Works at Barrow, costing £2,913.

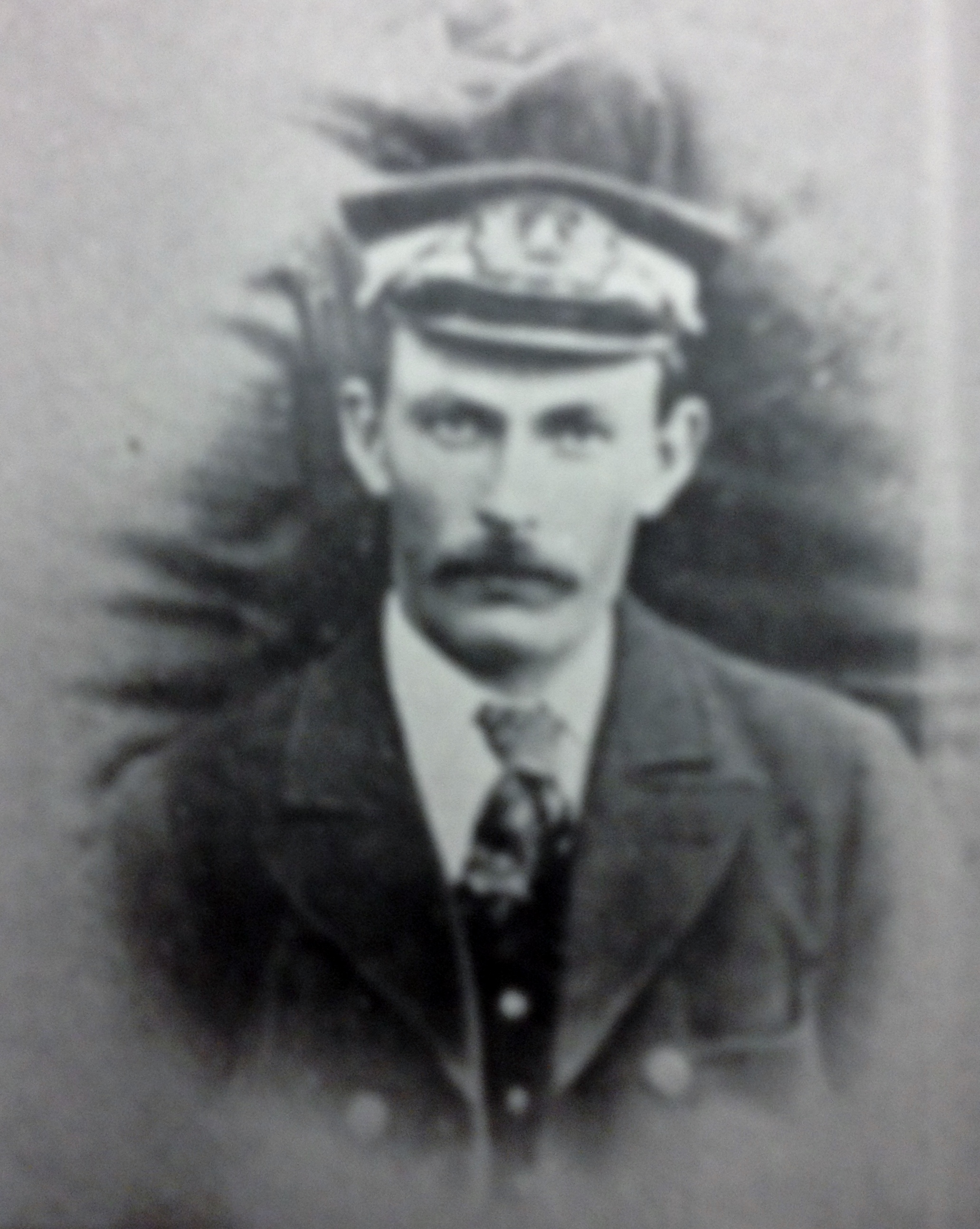
Captain James Teare.

By 1909 she was the smallest and oldest ship in the Steam Packet Fleet. Ellan Vannin was considered an exceptionally fine vessel in bad weather, carrying out the daily mail contract when other vessels were safe in harbour.

Indeed stormy weather appeared to be no deterrent to her, and it is reported that when up to 12 ocean liners had been taking shelter in Ramsey Bay, Ellan Vannin steamed through them as she made passage to Whitehaven and returned in the evening, the completion of her voyage being heralded by the ships sheltering in the bay sounding their whistles.

Ellan Vannin became looked upon as a mascot of the Steam Packet fleet, and known by Manx sailors as the Li'l Daisy.

== Loss ==
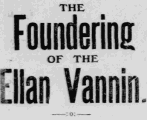
Headline in the Ramsey Courier, Saturday 10 December 1909.

On Friday 3 December 1909, Ellan Vannin left her home port of Ramsey at 01:13, under the command of her master, 37-year-old Captain James Teare. By that date Capt. Teare had some 18 years of experience, working his way through the company to the position of master. During the summer of 1909 Teare was in command of the King Orry and had only joined the Ellan Vannin the day before her ill-fated voyage. Captain Teare was married with four children.

Ellan Vannin was carrying 15 passengers and 21 crew as well as mail and 60 tonnes of cargo which included approximately 60 sheep.

The weather on departure was moderate and although the barometric pressure was falling the captain did not expect a significant deterioration in the weather. The wind direction on departure was from the northwest meaning Ellan Vannin would have a following sea during her passage – something which would have caused her master no particular concern. However, the weather rapidly worsened and by 06:35, when the ship arrived at the Mersey Bar lightvessel, the wind had risen to hurricane force 12, and waves were reported to be exceeding 24 feet (7 m) in height.

A strong consensus at the time was that with a following sea the Ellan Vannin had made good time to the Bar lightship. Upon reaching the Bar her course would have been changed from approximately 130 degrees to 080 degrees as she entered the approach channel to the river. This would have caused her to take the sea on her port beam with the result that she got sufficiently off her course to strike a sandbank thereby causing her to founder between the Bar lightship and the Q1 buoy, sinking in the Mersey approach channel (at 53°32′0″N 3°17′0″W). It is believed she was broached by a large wave, which overwhelmed the ship. She was swept by heavy seas and filled, sinking by the stern with the loss of all passengers and crew.

News of the disaster reached Douglas on the Friday evening, and the directors sat in almost continuous session until Monday. Communication was by telegram and information was difficult to ascertain.

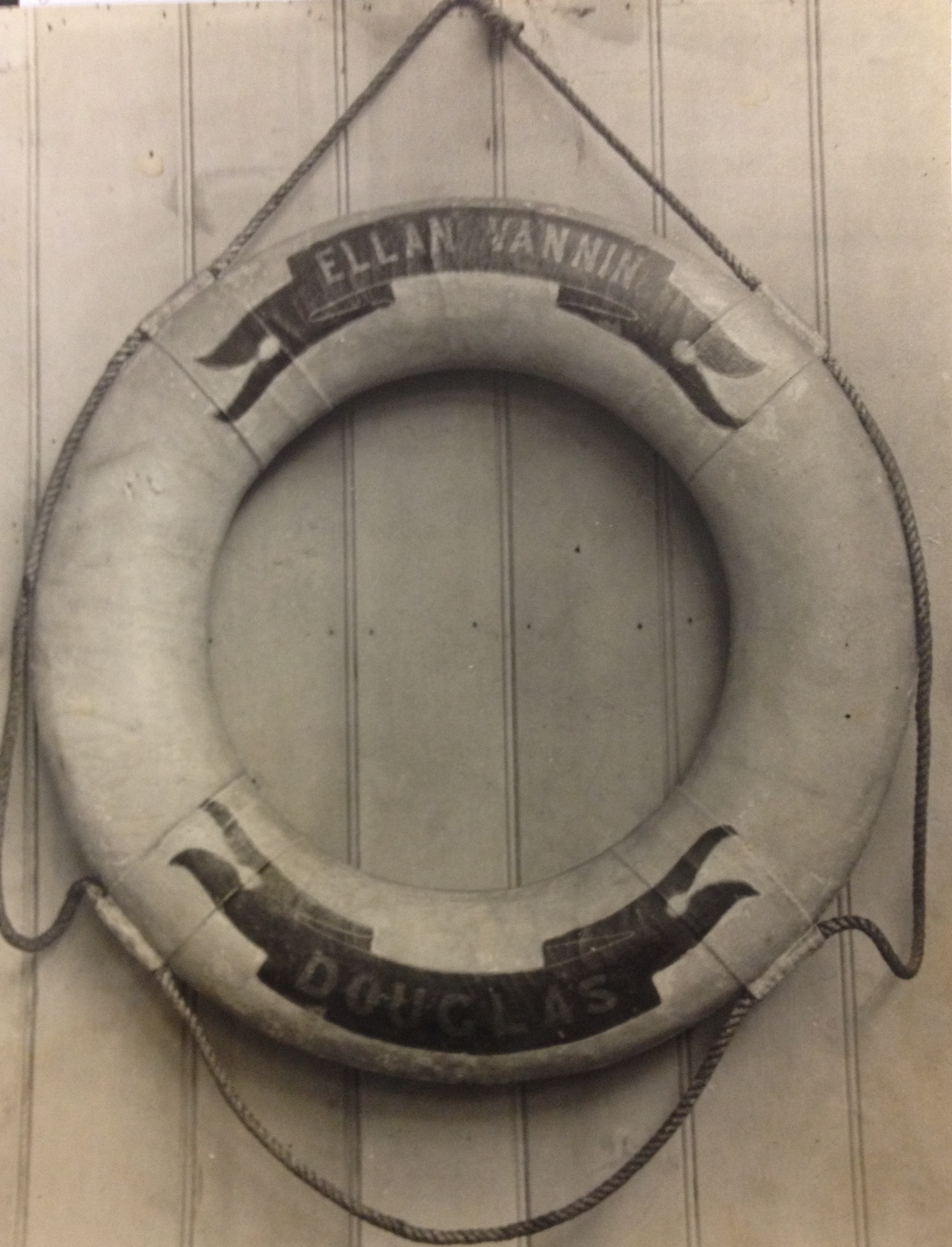
Lifebuoy from RMS Ellan Vannin.

At approximately 19:00hrs a telegram was received which reported that the crew of the Formby lightship had seen lifebuoys, bags of turnips, several dead sheep and a piano floating near the lightship. It was also reported that the crew of the lightship had picked up a mail bag which was destined for the Birkenhead Post Office and which was found to contain letters despatched from Ramsey.

The following morning the company offices in Douglas received a telegram from Liverpool stating that one of the Ellan Vannin's lifeboats had been washed ashore at New Brighton with its cover on and its working gear inside. Also washed ashore were parts of the ship's bridge.

On Saturday morning Tynwald departed Douglas to replace Fenella on the Douglas – Liverpool service, with Fenella in turn taking the sailing to Ramsey which should have been undertaken by Ellan Vannin.

The first bodies were recovered five days after the ship went down. In January 1910, Cpt. Teare's body was found washed ashore on Ainsdale beach in Southport. It was subsequently returned to the Isle of Man for burial.

== Aftermath ==
The Board of Trade inquiry found that the captain was not to blame for the disaster and the cause was extreme weather. The official inquiry referred to waves 24 feet (7 m) high and declared the ship to have been in good condition and fully seaworthy. After the foundering, her masts broke the surface. Divers inspecting the ship found damage to the bows and that the lifeboat davits had been swung out ready for lowering. Soon after the disaster the Mersey Docks and Harbour Board destroyed the wreck using explosives, as it was causing a hazard to shipping in the channel.

A disaster fund was established for those who were dependants of the deceased, the Steam Packet contributed £1,000 to this fund. It was set up by The Daily Telegraph at writer Hall Caine's instigation. Caine headed the list of contributors and wrote a poem The Loss of the Ellan Vannin. The crew of 21 included one woman, a Mrs Collister, of Crosby, Isle of Man, who left one child. The 20 men were survived by 18 widows and 70 children. All but two of the crew lived on the Isle of Man. Five of the passengers came from off Island, the rest from the north of the Island. The last beneficiary of the fund was Miss Benson of Ramsey, the daughter of one of the crew. She was 20 at the time of the disaster and was in very poor health. She was the last beneficiary of the fund, dying in 1974 at the age of 85.

Although the Isle of Man Steam Packet Company has a tradition of reusing ship names, they have never reused the name Ellan Vannin.

== Commemorations ==
In addition to Caine's poem following the disaster, another, "The Sorrowful Crossing" was written by Josephine Kermode. The Ellan Vannin Tragedy, a song written by Hughie Jones of the British folk band The Spinners, commemorates the disaster.

To mark the centenary of the tragedy, in 2009 the Isle of Man Post Office issued two stamps, picturing Ellan Vannin and Captain Teare.

== Victims ==
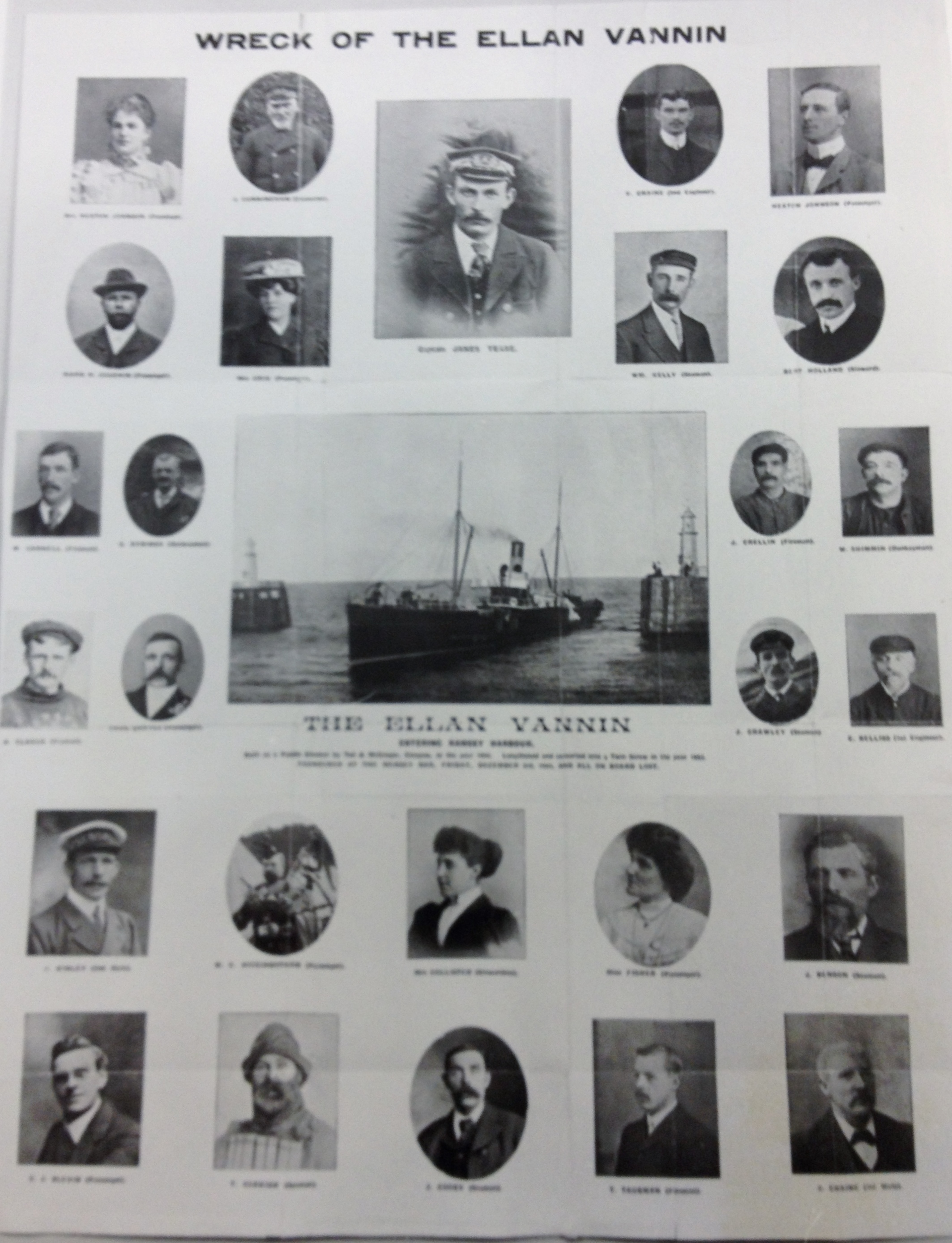
Some of the crew and passengers of the RMS Ellan Vannin.

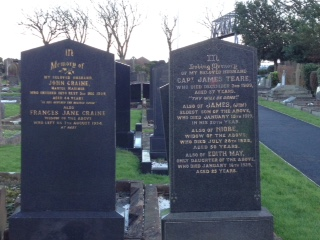
The adjacent graves of Captain Teare & First Officer Craine, Douglas Borough Cemetery, Douglas, Isle of Man

=== Crew ===
Second in command to Capt. Teare was 45-year-old First Officer John Craine of Leigh Terrace, Douglas, who like Capt. Teare had worked his way up through the company. During the previous summer Craine had served on the Mona. Second Officer was John Kinley of Surby, Port Erin, who had previously served on the Fenella. William Kelly, of Mill St, Castletown, although sailing as deck crew was a Licensed mariner who had served as Second Officer on the Tynwald during the summer. Kelly's brother was also in the employ of the Isle of Man Steam Packet Company and was also serving on the Ellan Vannin leaving the ship only a day or so before the sailing.

Name	Position	Place of residence
Teare, Capt. James	Captain	York Rd, Douglas, Isle of Man.
Craine, Mr John	First Officer	Leigh Terrace, Douglas, Isle of Man.
Kinley, Mr John Thomas	Second Officer	Surby, Port Erin, Isle of Man.
Bellis, Mr Edward	Chief Engineer	Dyson Street, Walton, Liverpool.
Craine, Mr Frederick	Second Engineer	Laureston Road, Douglas, Isle of Man.
Cannell, Mr Walter	Fireman	Onchan, Isle of Man.
Crellin, Mr Joseph	Fireman	Glen Vine, Marown, Isle of Man.
Shimmin, Mr William	Fireman	Ramsey, Isle of Man.
Taubman, Mr John Clague	Fireman	Big Well St, Douglas, Isle of Man.
Rydings, Mr Servetus	Donkeyman	South Quay, Douglas, Isle of Man.
Cunningham, Mr James Shepherd	Carpenter	Mona Terrace, Douglas, Isle of Man.
Cook, Mr John William	Able Seaman	Peel, Isle of Man.
Benson, Mr John	Seaman	Ramsey, Isle of Man.
Clague, Mr Richard Alfred	Seaman	Barrack St, Douglas, Isle of Man.
Crawley, Mr James Lambert	Seaman	Bucks Rd, Douglas, Isle of Man.
Corkish, Mr Thomas	Seaman	Ramsey, Isle of Man.
Kelly, Mr William	Seaman	Mill St, Castletown, Isle of Man.
Burke, Mr Edward	Ship's Cook	Derby Rd, Douglas, Isle of Man.
Stubbs, Mr Thomas	Chief Steward	Liverpool.
Holland, Mr Herbert Holden	Second Steward	Head Rd, Douglas, Isle of Man.
Collister, Mrs Eliza	Stewardess	Crosby, Isle of Man.

=== Passengers ===
Of the passengers on board, two were leaving the Isle of Man for business overseas. Mark Joughin of Ballawhannell, Bride, Isle of Man, was on his way to America to make enquiries into an estate which had been left to him. Another passenger was Edgar Blevin of the accountancy firm Kerruish, Son & Blevin of Douglas and Liverpool, whilst Christopher Heaton-Johnson of Beaconsfield Towers, Ramsey, Isle of Man, was en route to India. Thomas Quayle of Andreas, Isle of Man was a former steward for the Archdeacon of Sodor and Man, he was on his way to Liverpool in order to undergo an operation. He left a widow and three children. Two of the passengers, Daniel Newell of Croydon, Surrey, and Walter Williams of Earl's Court, London, were engaged in carrying out stone work on the Catholic church, Ramsey, Isle of Man.

There were of course many who had intended to travel on the night crossing on the Ellan Vannin that night. Some were put off by the weather or other circumstances intervened.

One of those who had intended to travel was Mr Harry Kaighen. He caught the 21:15 tram from Douglas, ( same tram the Allen's caught) but decided to stay overnight at his sisters and catch the daytime sailing next day. Also a Miss Moore of Water St, Ramsey, a Major Banster, the Reverend Deverall and the Weldhern family. Their furniture was loaded onto the beads, and it was their piano found floating in the sea the next day.

After the sinking there was talk that there may have been a 15th passenger. Some stories suggest a Mr Wright, a distant relative of Capt Teare, was on board. Another story suggests that a Miss Ethel Lay, a friend of Miss Findlay, had boarded. The ticket inspector remembers seeing Miss Findlay board the vessel, being accompanied by Miss Lay, but couldn't remember punching one or two tickets.

Mary Allen and her son had been over on the island inspecting extension to their property - Hawthorn Cottage in Maughold. Mrs Allen was a Sunday school teacher at St Luke's church at top of Bold Street ( now known as the bombed out church). They caught the tram into Ramsey to make the sailing. Ernest's body was later recovered from the ship. His mother remained lost at sea.

Louisa Hannah Findlay, was 21 at the time of her death. Her full address was 183 Grangehill Road, Eltham. Her death was registered in Ormskirk, Lancashire in January 1910, and she was buried at the church of St John the Baptist, Eltham on 21 January 1910. She was the second eldest of eight children born in Woolwich to William and Ann Findlay. Her younger siblings were born variously in Bombay, India, and Bermuda, suggesting that the family was well travelled - William rose to be an examiner with the Royal Arsenal in Woolwich.

Name	Age	Place of residence
Mrs Mary Allen	46	Liverpool/ Maughold
Mstr. Ernest Allen	15	Liverpool/ Maughold
Mr Edgar John Blevin	-	Vaughn Rd, New Brighton, Cheshire.
Mrs Amy Crix	22	College St, Ramsey, Isle of Man.
Miss Mary-Ann Crix	10 months	College St, Ramsey, Isle of Man.
Miss Louisa Findlay	21	Grange Hill Rd, Eltham, Kent.
Miss Eleanor Fisher	30	Queen's Hotel, Ramsey, Isle of Man.
Mr Christopher Thomas Heaton-Johnson	35	Beaconsfield Towers, Ramsey, Isle of Man.
Mrs Isabella Winifred Heaton-Johnson	-	Beaconsfield Towers, Ramsey, Isle of Man.
Mr William Edward Higginbottom	-	Trafalgar Hotel, Ramsey, Isle of Man.
Mr Mark Henry Joughin	-	Ballawhannell, Bride, Isle of Man.
Mr Daniel Newell	-	Hampton Rd, Croydon, Surrey.
Mr Thomas Henry Quayle	-	Andreas, Isle of Man.
Mr Walter Williams	-	Earl's Court Rd, London.

== Gallery ==
RMS Ellan Vannin
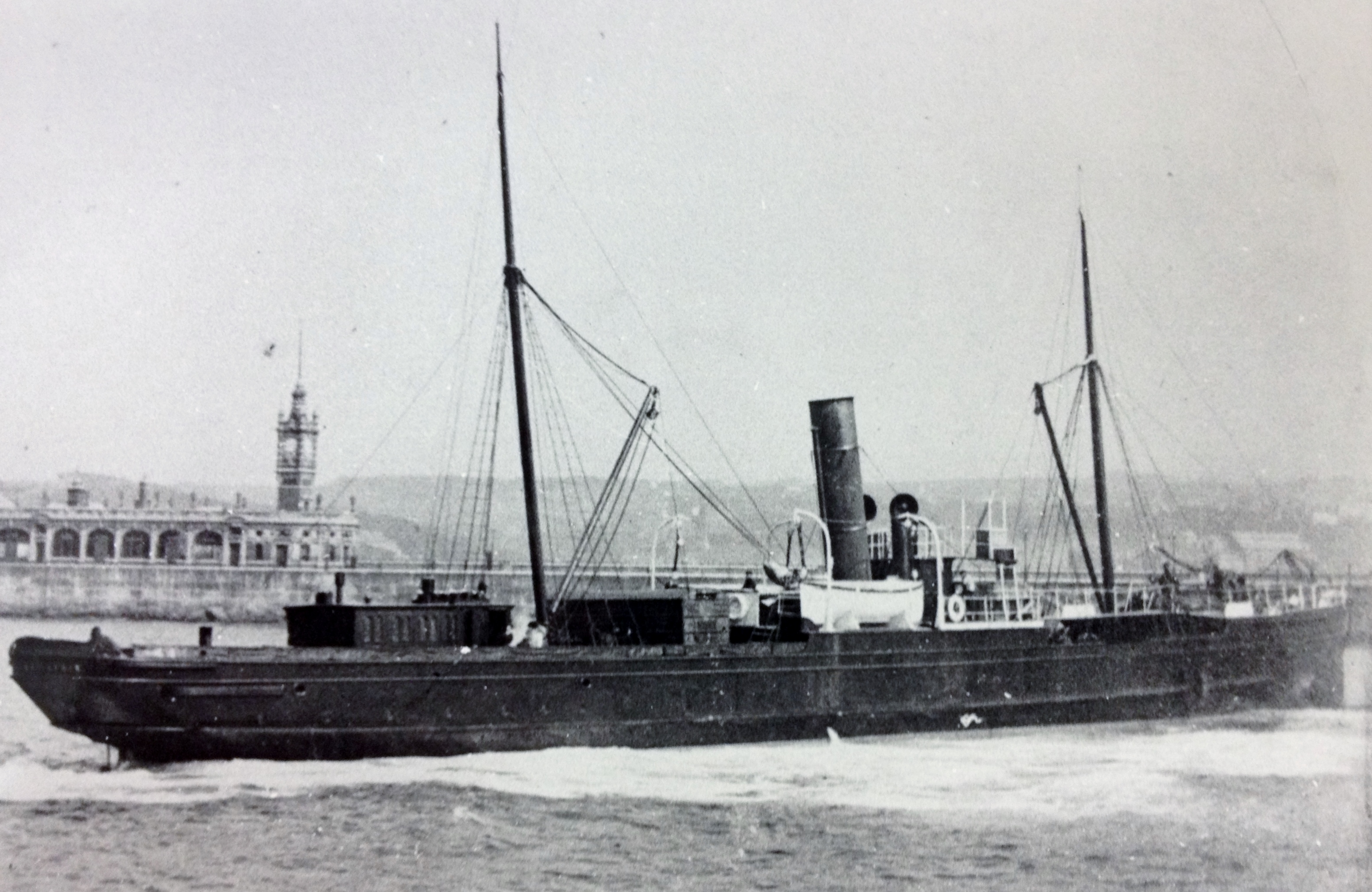
Ellan Vannin pictured departing Douglas.

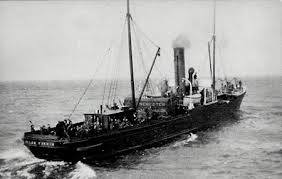
Ellan Vannin

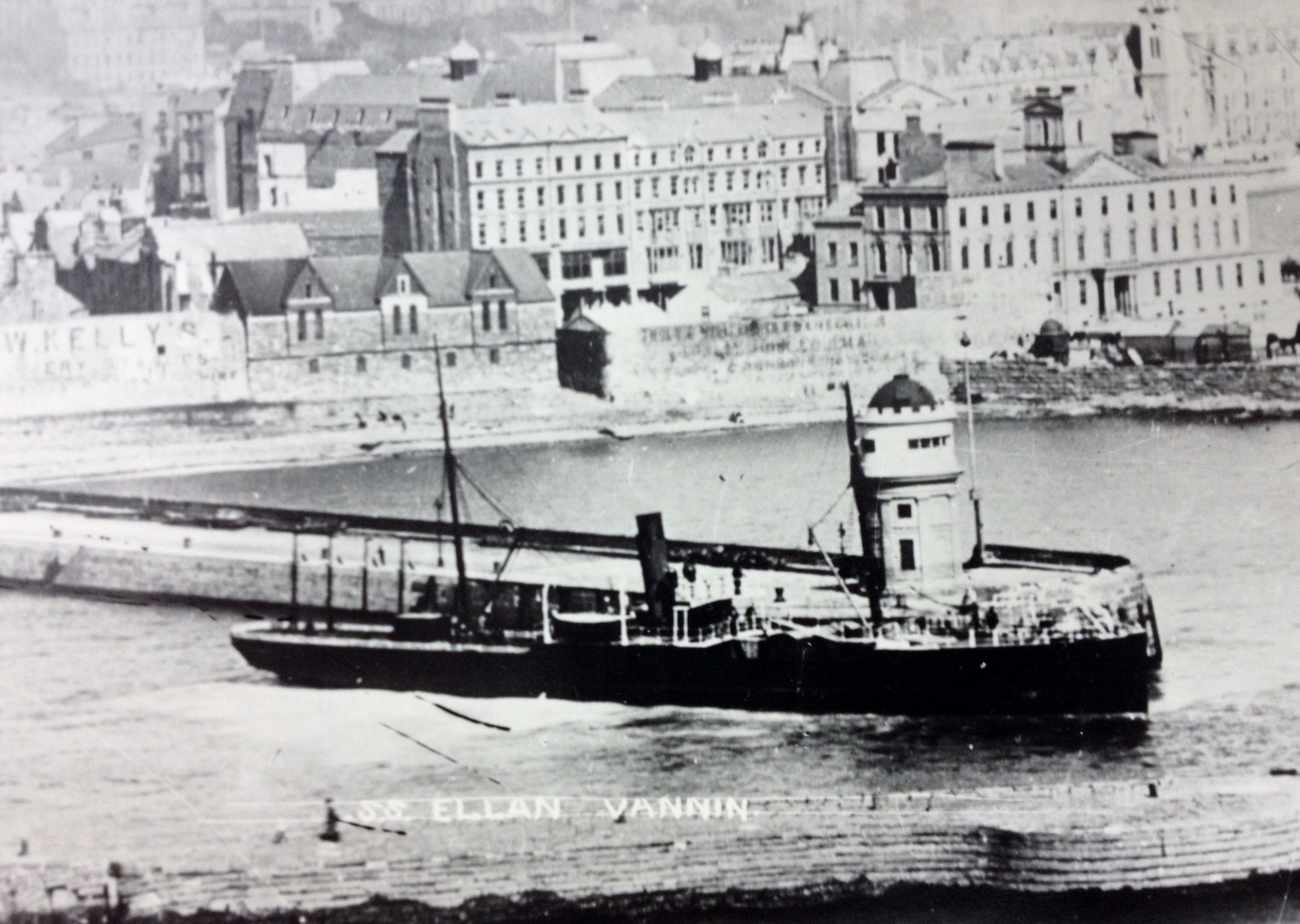
RMS Ellan Vannin pictured passing the Red Pier, Douglas
