= SS Tynwald (1891) =

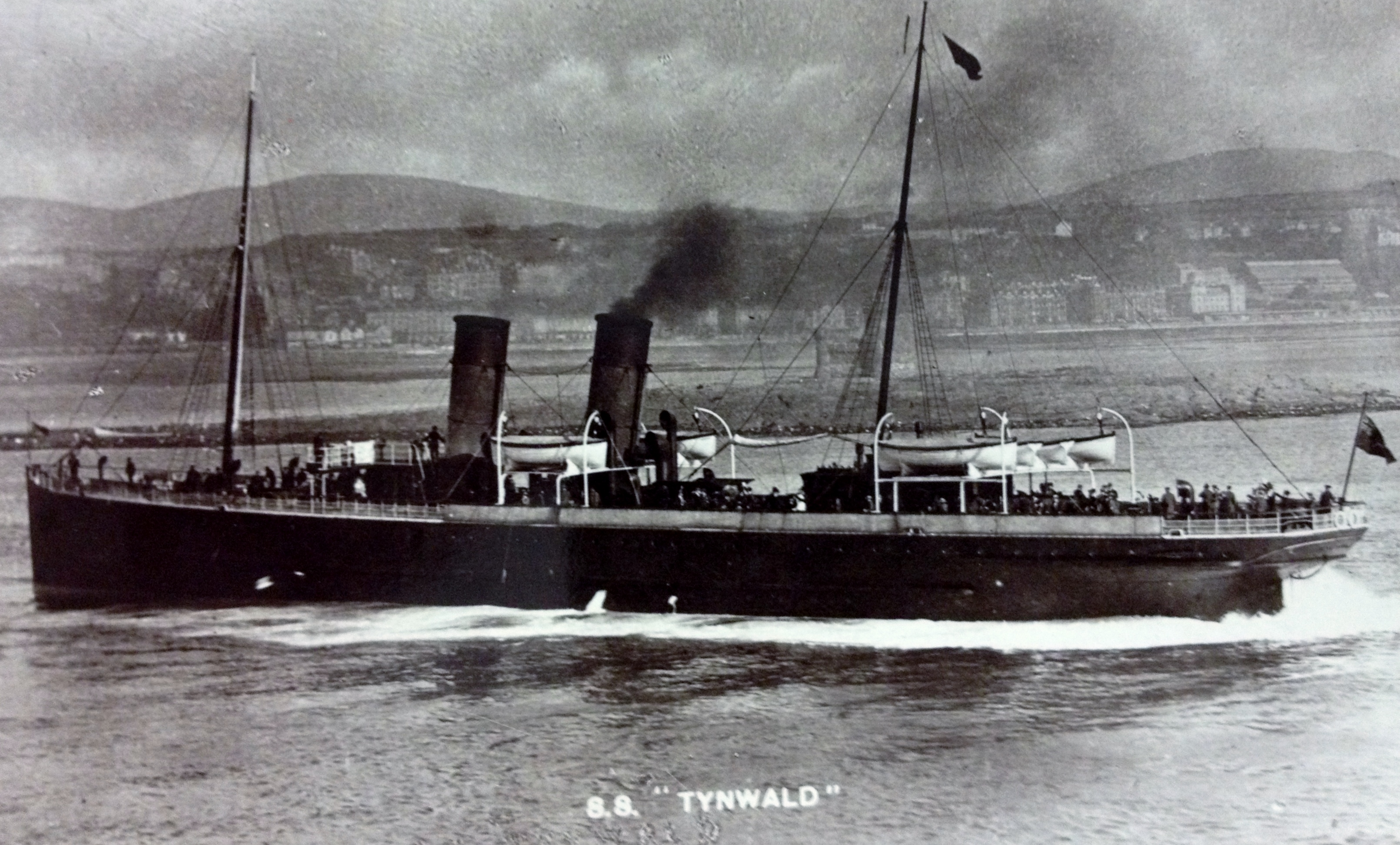
- Tynwald leaving Douglas

History
- Name: Tynwald; 1934: Western Isles; 1940: Eastern Isles
- Owner: Isle of Man Steam Packet Company (1891-1934); 1934-1940 Mr. R. A. Colby Cubbin; 1940-1947 Admiralty
- Operator: IoMSPCo (1891-1934)
- Port of registry: Douglas, Isle of Man
- Builder: Fairfield Shipbuilding and Engineering Company, Govan
- Cost: £58,683 (equivalent to £8,095,155 in 2023).
- Way number: 95755
- Launched: 11 May 1891
- Completed: 1891
- In service: 1891
- Out of service: 1934
- Identification: Official Number 95755.; Code Letters P K G D; Code Letters P W G F
- Fate: Sold 1933, to Smith & Houston, Port Glasgow for scrapping. Sold to R. A. Colby Cubbin, 1934 and converted to a private yacht.; Requisitioned by the Admiralty, 1939.; Returned to owner upon release in 1946, laid up in Wallasey Dock.; Taken in tow by tug Airman in 1951 to Spezia, Italy, and scrapped.

General characteristics
- Type: Passenger Steamer
- Tonnage: 937 gross register tons (GRT)
- Length: 265 ft (81 m) p/p
- Beam: 34 ft (10 m)
- Depth: 14 ft (4.3 m)
- Installed power: 3,800 ihp (2,834 kW)
- Propulsion: 2 × triple-expansion engines developing 3,800 ihp (2,834 kW)
- Speed: 18 knots (33 km/h; 21 mph)
- Capacity: 904 passengers
- Crew: 50

SS (RMS) Tynwald (III), No. 95755, was an iron passenger steamer which served with the Isle of Man Steam Packet Company, and was the third vessel in the Company to bear the name.

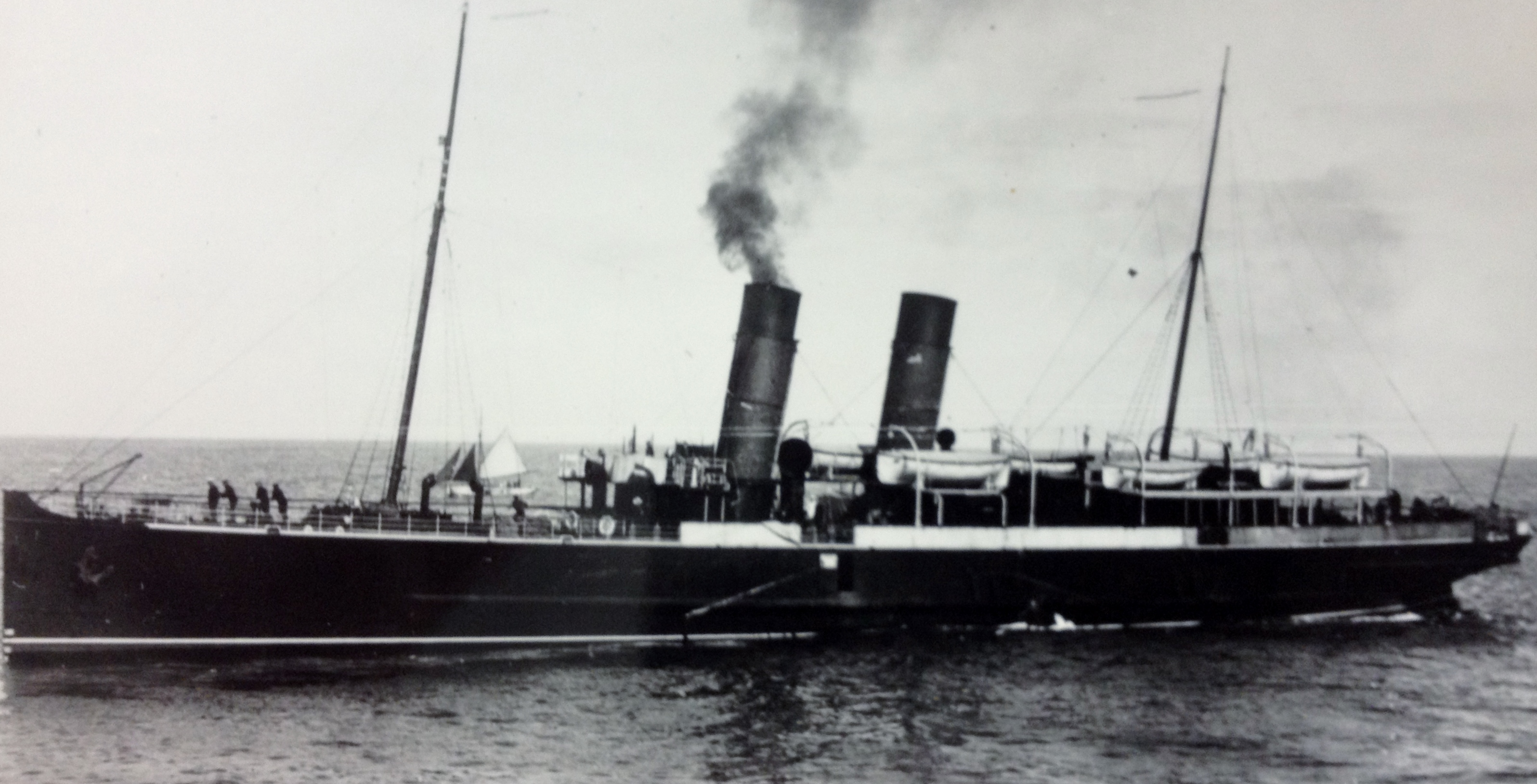
Tynwald

== Dimensions ==
Built by Fairfields at Govan in 1891, Tynwald was the first Isle of Man Steam Packet Company vessel fitted with a triple-expansion engine. She was launched on Monday, 11 May 1891; for the first time in the Company's history the builders' specification included full installation of electric lighting.

Tynwald had a certificate for 679 first class passengers and 225 third, a total of 904, and a crew of 50.

Tynwald had a registered tonnage (GRT) of 937. Length 265 feet (81 metres) between perpendiculars; beam 34 feet (10 metres); depth 14 feet; and a speed of 18 knots. Her two boilers had a steam pressure of 160 PSI (1.1 megapascals) and each boiler was fired by eight furnaces. She had bunker capacity of 120 tons of coal. The two sets of triple-expansion engines developed 3,800 indicated horsepower (equivalent to 2.8 megawatts) at 120 rpm.

== Service life ==
Tynwald made her first appearance in Douglas on 27 June 1891. Fast for her size, she could hold her own with the Queen Victoria. In 1900 when racing with the Queen Victoria against an opposition steamer the Lily, Tynwald arrived at Liverpool four minutes ahead of the Queen Victoria and eleven minutes ahead of the Lily.

Tynwald was designed and built as a winter vessel on the Douglas - Liverpool service, and in the summer on general duties which included the newly introduced Douglas — Ardrossan run. In July 1912, she inaugurated a service from Douglas and Ramsey to Whitehaven

In September 1892, Mona's Isle went aground at Scarlett Point, Castletown, while rounding the south of the Island, homeward bound from Dublin.

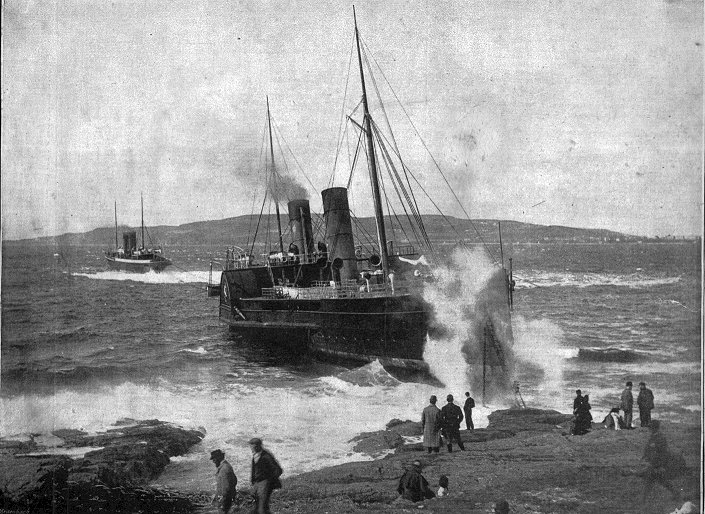
Tynwald lends assistance to Mona's Isle which had run aground at Scarlett Point, September 1892

She was fast aground for two days, and was re-floated after assistance from Tynwald, her passengers having previously been landed onto the rocks by way of a rather precarious ladder from her bows.

On 6 April 1893, while at anchor in the Mersey, she was run into by the steamer Lotus and extensively damaged. In 1912, she opened a service from Douglas to Whitehaven calling at Ramsey, and was also used as a winter vessel on the main home run.

== First World War ==
Tynwald did not serve as a military vessel during the First World War, but instead, continued as a commercial vessel.

In 1914 she carried the first German prisoners of war to the Island for internment at Knockaloe.

She shared the Douglas — Liverpool home run with Fenella throughout the war. Under the command of Capt. Cojeen, she had a number of close encounters with floating mines but was never hit; the minesweepers worked day and night to keep the approaches to Liverpool open.

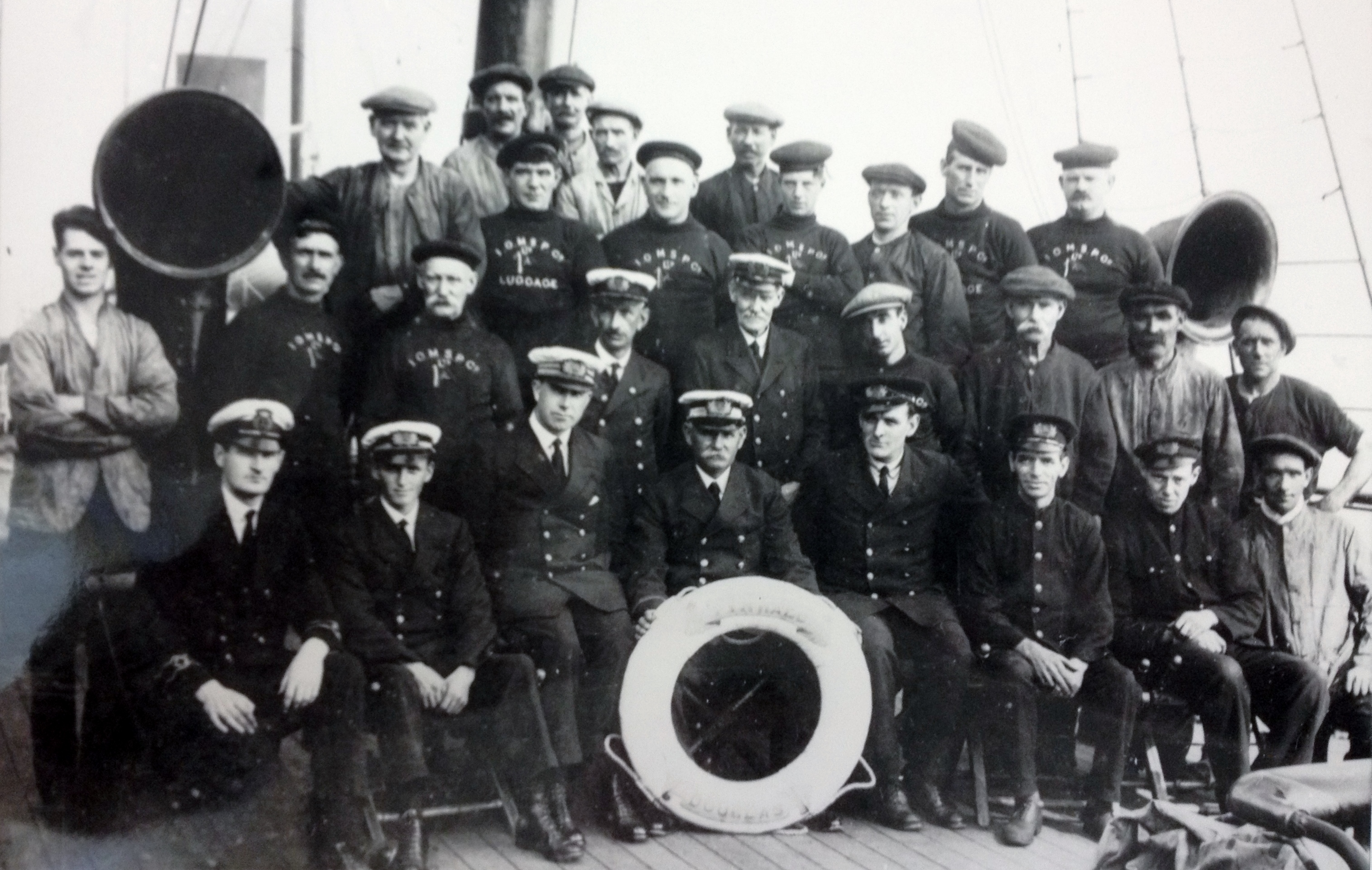
Officers, Engine Room Staff and Deck Crew of Tynwald, 1928. Capt J.J. Qurik (pictured centre).

However, on many occasions her sailings had to be postponed, owing to special danger from mines. One of the Liverpool pilot-boats struck a mine just outside the Formby Lightship. The boat was blown to pieces, and some forty people died, including 26 first-class Liverpool pilots. The Tynwald probably passed this mine several times in the course of her usual work.

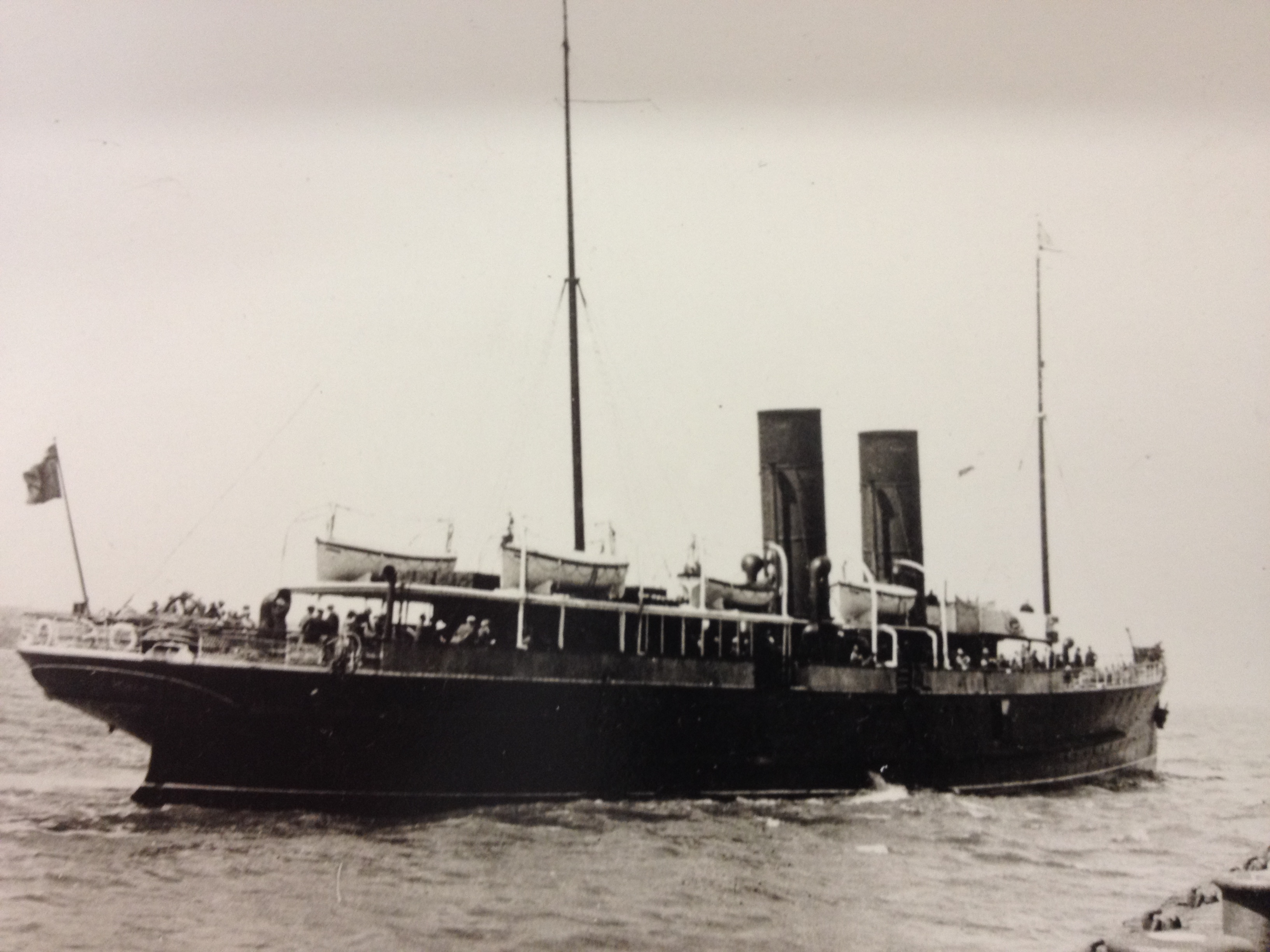
Tynwald at the Prince's Landing Stage, Liverpool

On 9 April 1917, a German submarine had penetrated to within a few miles of Liverpool and succeeded in torpedoing the American liner SS City of New York. The Tynwald, inward bound from Douglas, was just passing the Bar Light Ship and was quickly on the scene. The weather at the time was far from good, a strong wind blowing with showers of snow at intervals. The passengers were conveyed in the liner's own lifeboats, which came alongside the Tynwald, and, although the sea was distinctly lumpy, causing a considerable rise and fall of the lifeboats, all were safely taken on board, including Admiral Sims of the U.S. Navy.

During the transfer of the passengers, three or four patrol steamers and tug-boats came to the liner's assistance. The damage to the SS City of New York was in the fore part of the vessel, and, as the bulkhead abaft where she was struck remained intact, the ship was able to float, although the forward compartments were full of water.

The SS City of New York was taken in tow by tugs and eventually docked.

On another occasion, Tynwald left Douglas at 14:00hrs, landed her passengers and mails at Liverpool, and then returned to Douglas light. Tynwald then sailed again the next morning at 09:00, and upon arrival at Liverpool, having completed three trips and taken in coal, she was told to return to the Landing Stage with all speed.

The Easter Rising had begun in Dublin, and Tynwald was ordered to take a full load of troops to Ireland, and sailed at 19:30hrs. Enemy submarines were very busy at that time in the Irish Sea, but the Tynwald landed her men safely at Kingstown the following morning.

On another occasion, having arrived at Liverpool Landing Stage, Tynwald was ordered, after discharging mails and passengers, to take coal as speedily as possible. Upon completion of coaling, she embarked divers and other workmen of the Mersey Docks and Harbour Board along with their equipment, and made passage straight back to the Island.

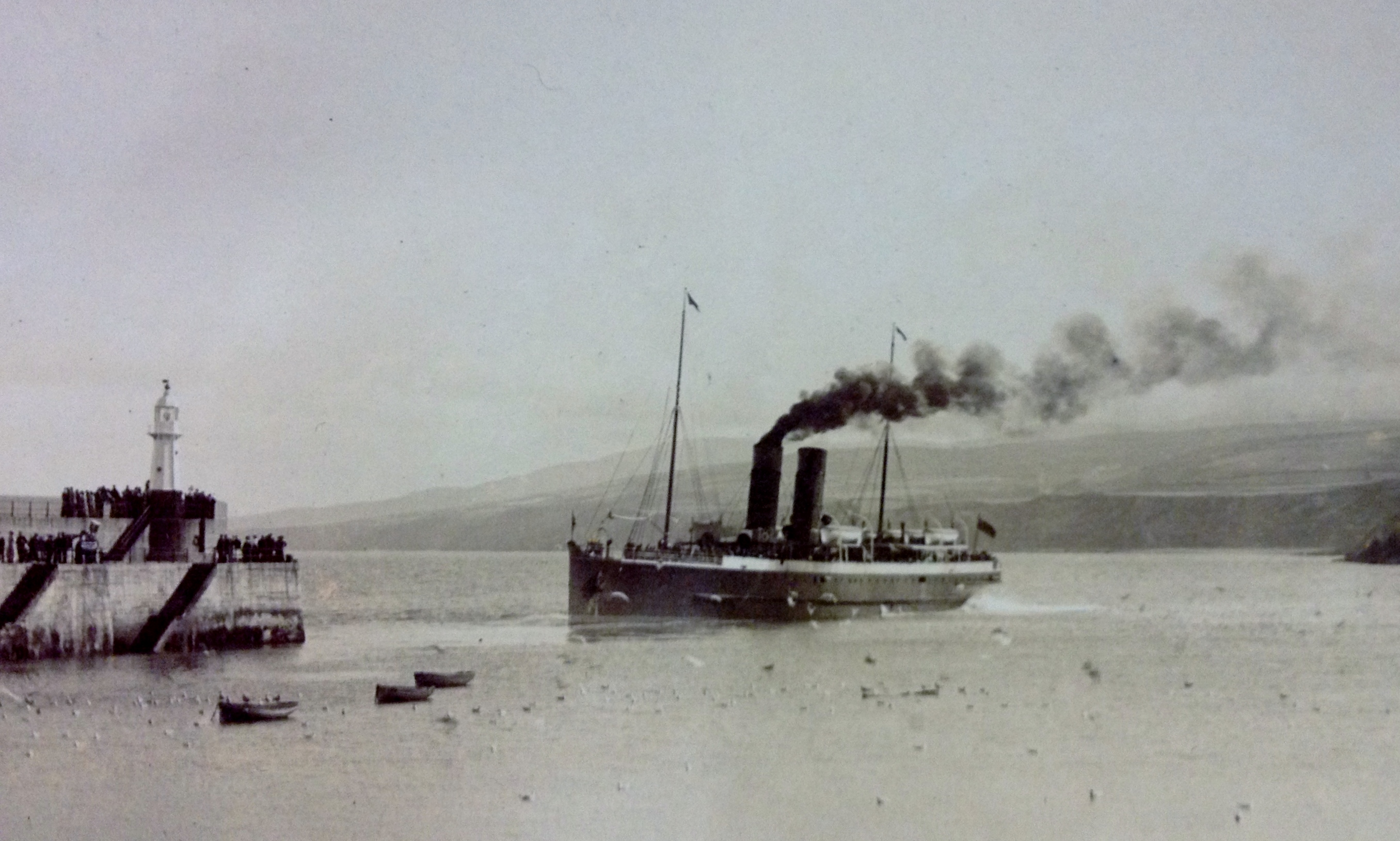
Tynwald departing Peel, Isle of Man.

News had come through that the White Star steamer RMS Celtic had been torpedoed, with the loss of many lives, off the Calf of Man, and was then anchored off Peel, carefully guarded by Destroyers. With all speed the Tynwald proceeded to Peel Breakwater, and there landed the men and their gear. The Celtic was speedily patched up, and taken to Harland and Wolff's works at Belfast.

Commerce to and from the Port of Liverpool routinely suffered owing to the port being closed due to perceived enemy activity. On one such occasion, when the Tynwald arrived at the Bar (about 18:45), she had to dodge about with her passengers aboard all that night, and until 19:00hrs the next day, with the constant danger of striking a mine, or of encountering a submarine.

The Tynwald continued in service, summer and winter, right through the War, except when undergoing survey and repairs. She came through unscathed. She carried no guns, was never camouflaged, but was painted as usual, black with red funnels.

== Inter-war period ==
On returning to normal service after the Great War, she was used in excursion runs from Blackpool. These trips usually took in calls at Morecambe, Douglas and Llandudno

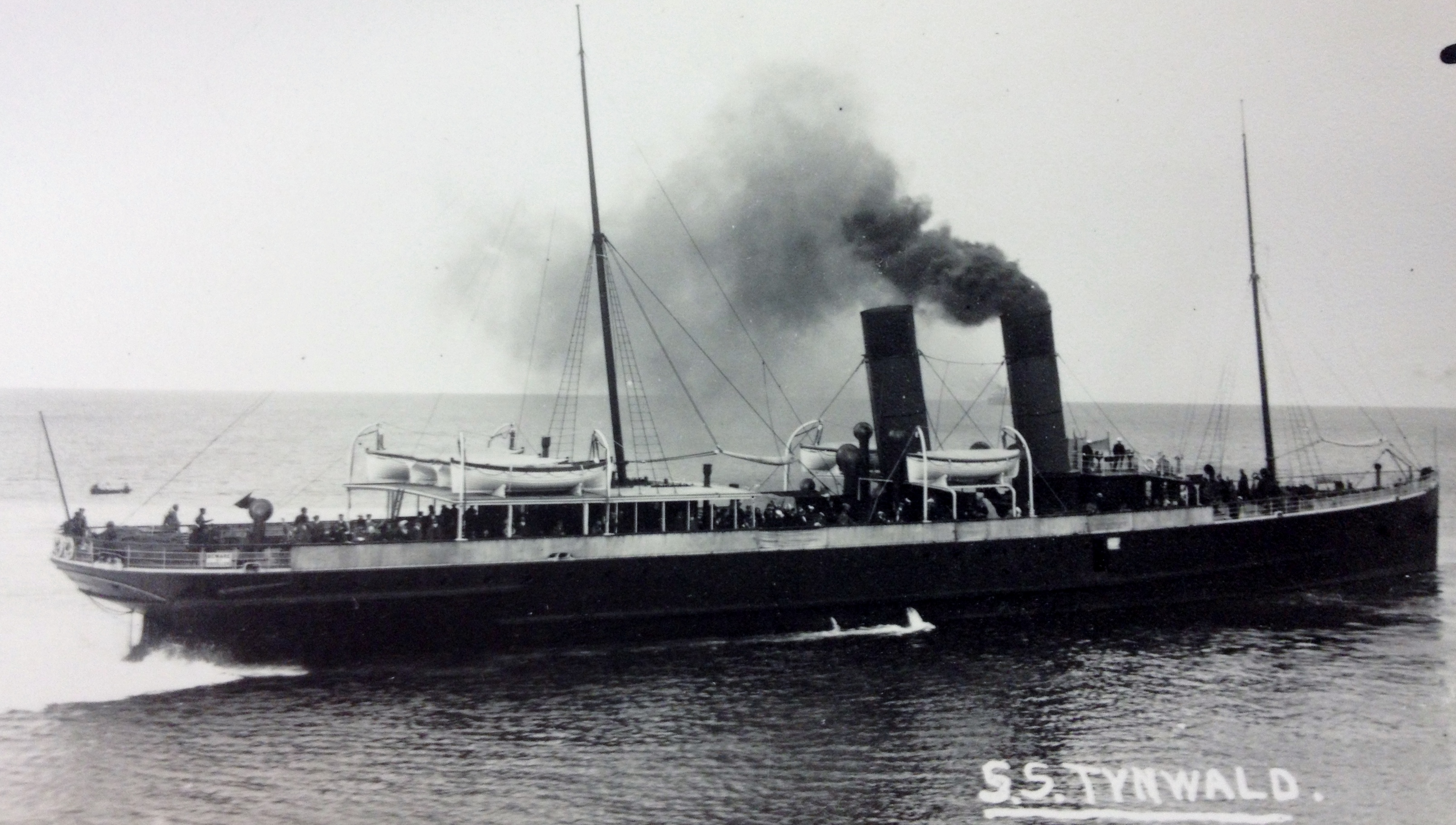
Tynwald pictured leaving Douglas, Isle of Man.

On Friday 13 November 1925, the Tynwald fouled the anchor chain of another vessel as she prepared to berth alongside the Prince’s Landing Stage. Damage was sustained to the Tynwald's screw as a consequence of which she missed her scheduled sailing to Douglas, requiring the Mona to undertake the schedule.

It was intended to scrap her in 1933, but these arrangements were cancelled and she was purchased in 1934 by Mr. R. A. Colby Cubbin for conversion into a private yacht. In 1935 she was renamed Western Isles, but spent several years lying in the King George V Dock, Glasgow.

== Second World War ==
Western Isles was requisitioned by the Admiralty as an auxiliary in April 1940. On 27 October 1941, she was renamed Eastern Isles and used as an accommodation ship at HMS Eaglet in Birkenhead until 27 April 1946.

== Post war ==
Eastern Isles was returned to her owner in 1947 who was faced with an unviable bill for £100,000 (equivalent to £4,942,020 in 2023) in order to put her back into service.

== Disposal ==
In 1951, Eastern Isles was sold and taken in tow by the tug Airman to Spezia for breaking. She left Birkenhead at 07:30hrs on Wednesday, 13 May 1951.
