= SS Fenella (1881) =

Passenger steam ship

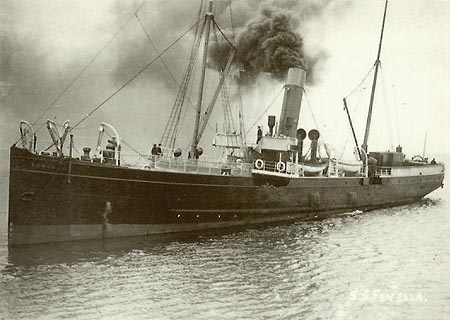
- RMS Fenella

History
- Name: Fenella
- Owner: 1881–1929: Isle of Man Steam Packet Company
- Operator: 1881–1929: IOMSPCo.
- Port of registry: Douglas, Isle of Man
- Builder: Barrow Shipbuilding Company, Barrow-in-Furness
- Cost: £18,750
- Launched: 9 June 1881
- Maiden voyage: 1881
- Out of service: 1929
- Identification: Official Number 76303; Code Letters J C T G
- Fate: Sold 1929. Scrapped at Newport

General characteristics
- Type: Packet Steamer
- Tonnage: 564 gross register tons (GRT)
- Length: 200 feet (61 m)
- Beam: 26 feet (7.9 m)
- Depth: 13 feet (4.0 m)
- Installed power: 1,200 shp (890 kW)
- Propulsion: Two sets of vertical compound engines, working at 85 pounds per square inch (590 kPa), producing an indicated horsepower of 1,200 shp (890 kW)
- Speed: 14 knots (26 km/h; 16 mph)
- Capacity: 504 passengers
- Crew: 28

SS (RMS) Fenella (I), No.76303, was an Iron twin-screw steamer operated by the Isle of Man Steam Packet Company, and was the first ship in the company's history to bear the name.

== Construction and dimensions ==
Fenella was built by the Barrow Shipbuilding Company of Barrow-in-Furness and was launched at Barrow by Miss Barnett on Thursday 9 June 1881. Tonnage 564 GRT; length 200 ft; beam 26 ft; depth 13 ft. The vessel cost £18,750 and was certificated for a crew of 28 and 504 passengers. She had an indicated horsepower of 1,200 and a speed of 14 knots, with a boiler pressure of 85 psi. She was driven by two sets of vertical compound engines, each with cylinder bores of 23 and 42 inches, with a stroke of 24 inches.

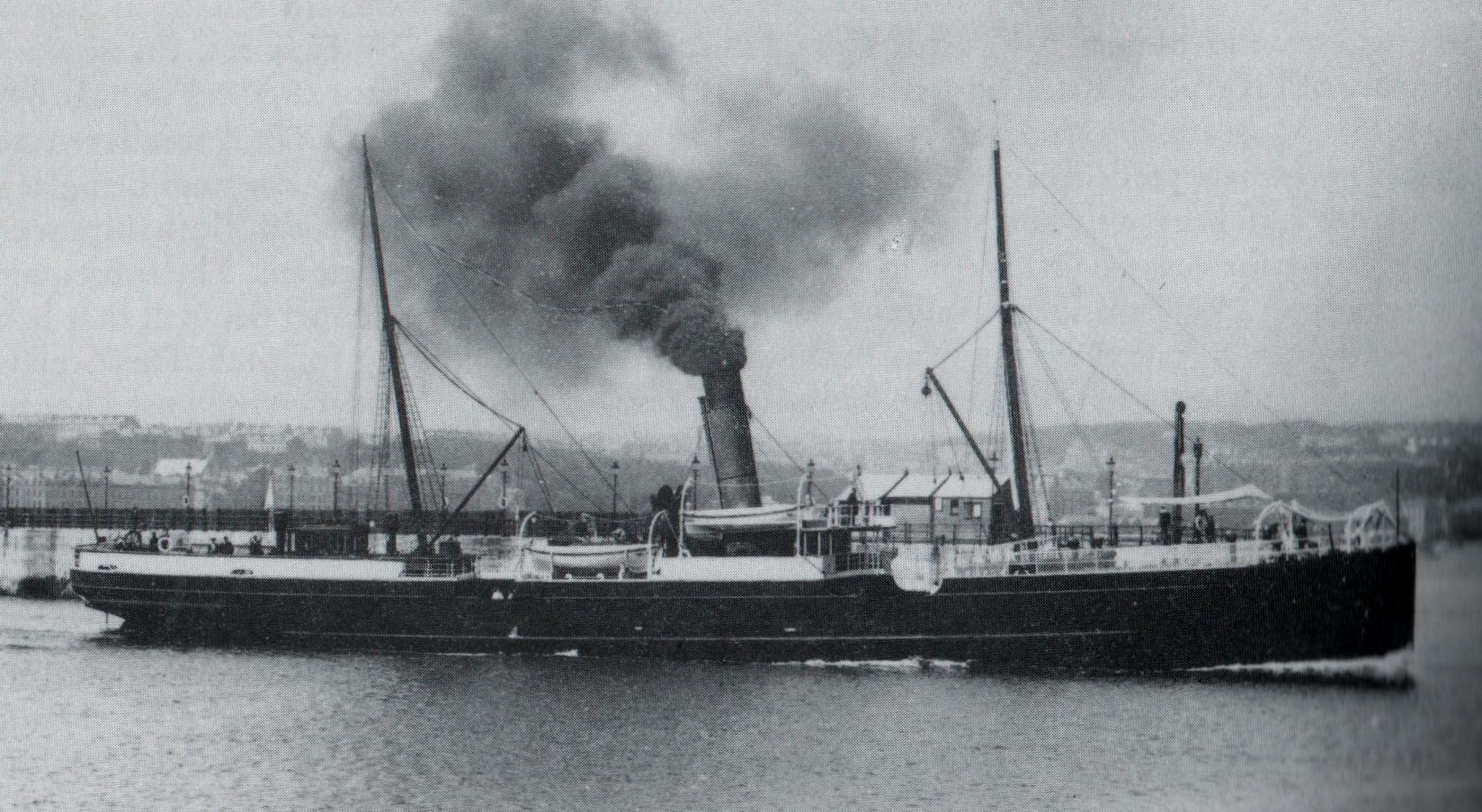
RMS Fenella pictured departing Douglas, Isle of Man.

There was a slight delay in the construction of Fenella, due to a misunderstanding about the construction of her sleeping accommodation. The Isle of Man Weekly Advertising Circular described her as:

"A handsomely modest twin-screw steamer, with a long poop deck and complete arrangements made for a large number of passengers, either day or night. The lower saloon is also fitted complete for passengers, ladies’ retiring rooms with every comfort being provided."

— The Isle of Man Weekly Advertising. Tuesday 14 June 1881.

Following her fitting out and Sea Trials, Fenella arrived at her home port, Douglas, under the command of Capt. Gibson on Saturday 9 July 1881, and then proceeded on a trial run between Douglas and Maughold Head.

== Service life ==
Fenella served with the Steam Packet fleet for 48 years, including serving the Island during the First World War. At least one mercantile authority considers that from a steamship development viewpoint, the Fenella was the most interesting vessel built for the company since the first vessel, Mona's Isle, in 1830.

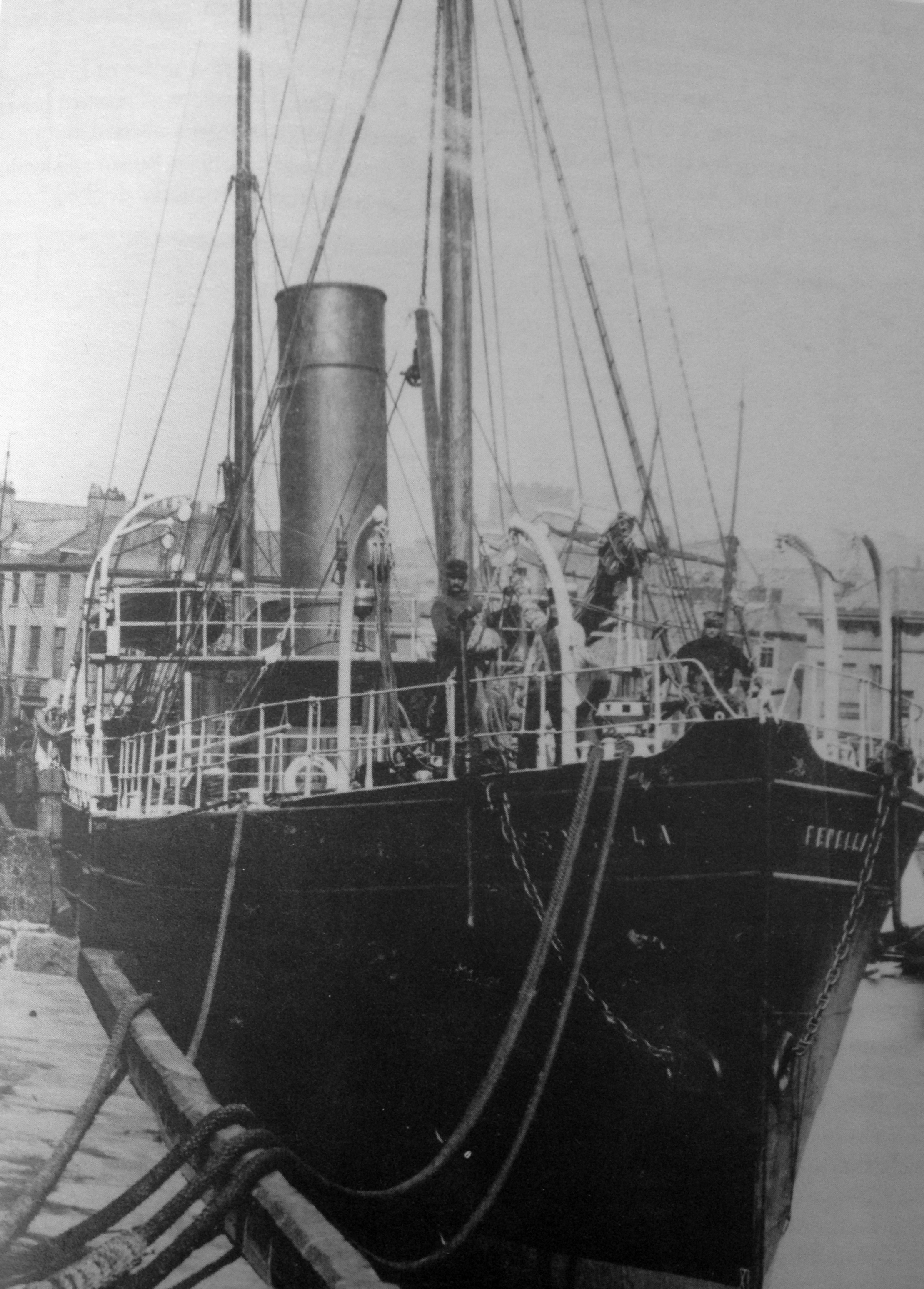
Fenella.

Her work demonstrated that high steam pressure with compound engines, having a higher piston speed than would have been practical in a paddle steamer, gave her greater economy in performance.

Amongst Fenella’s first operational duties, was a special excursion to the River Clyde, departing Douglas for Greenock on Thursday 14 July. As well as this, the Fenella, along with her sister Tynwald, was employed in a series of round-the-island summer cruises. On Tuesday 16 August 1881 the steamer Princess Royal broke down to the northeast of the Isle of Man whilst making passage between Liverpool and Glasgow. She was taken under tow to Ramsey Bay, and eventually her passengers and luggage were transferred to the Fenella, which was en route form Douglas to Glasgow.

Fenella’s introduction into winter service proved popular with passengers as she established her reputation as a fine and reliable sea boat.

On Tuesday 7 November 1882, the Fenella recorded the fastest time for passage between Whitehaven and Ramsey, sailing from pier to pier in a time of 2 hours, 10 minutes.

A mixture of easterly storms in the Irish Sea, which hampered operations from Ramsey, combined with fog in the River Mersey during early January 1883, resulted in severe disruption. The Fenella departed Ramsey at 09:00 hrs on the morning of Saturday 7 January, arriving alongside the Prince’s Landing Stage at 13:00 hrs the following day, resulting in a time of 28 hours at sea.

On Friday 19 January 1883, the Fenella took the Mona’s Isle under tow to Barrow in order for her to undergo her rebuild. Following her conversion, Mona’s Isle rejoined the fleet under her new name, Ellan Vannin.

Fenella was overhauled in 1894 and a full electric light system fitted—56 lights in all. The installation was carried out by J. W. Holmes of Liverpool, who also installed electric lighting in Fenella's younger sister Peveril, at the same time. The cost of the work for the two vessels was £505.

Primarily a cargo ship, intended to do passenger runs as a relief service in winter, it could possibly be claimed that she worked harder than any other of the company's ships in her day. She served on every route the Steam Packet Company then operated, including the Peel – Belfast run, one of a number no longer operated. Fenella also operated numerous sailings to the Isle of Man from Whitehaven.

On one occasion she made six round trips between Douglas and Liverpool and then took troops to Kingstown, all in three days.

On Saturday 6 June 1896, a new lifeboat was acquired by Douglas, replacing the previous one which had been destroyed in Douglas Harbour during a south-easterly gale on the night of Saturday 12 January 1895. The new lifeboat shared the same name as the previous one: Civil Service, No. 6. Built by Messers Rutherford of Birkenhead, she was towed across to the Isle of Man by the Fenella.

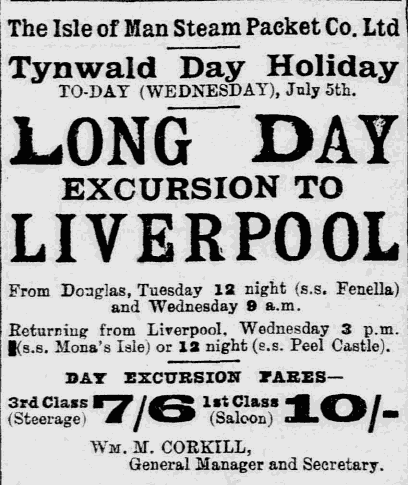
Advertisement for a Tynwald Day Excursion to Liverpool.

=== Mail and cargo ===
Fenella was designed to carry a mixture of passengers and cargo. Her designation as a Royal Mail Ship (RMS) indicated that she carried mail under contract with the Royal Mail. A specified area was allocated for the storage of letters, parcels and specie (bullion, coins and other valuables). In addition, there was a considerable quantity of regular cargo, ranging from furniture to foodstuffs and even motor cars.

During early March 1900, there were several rumours spread throughout the Isle of Man concerning the possibility of a banking crisis, which ultimately led to a run on the Island’s banks. What amounted to panic spread, with depositors all wishing to withdraw their money in gold. These requests were met; however, the gold had to be despatched from Douglas, and reserves were heavily called upon. The Fenella was required to sail for Liverpool, and returned to the island early in the hours of Friday 16 March, with gold bullion totalling £200,000 on board.

== War service ==
Although not requisitioned for war service, Fenella, together with the Tynwald, shared the Douglas–Liverpool route throughout the First World War. Even though she was not directly involved in the war, Fenella had a number of close encounters with floating mines but was never hit; the minesweepers worked day and night to keep the approaches to Liverpool open, and although there were casualties, they were relatively few.

Fenella's first wartime task was to transport 200 reservists from the Isle of Man to Liverpool on the night of 7 August 1914.

A strike by dockers at Douglas in February 1915 required the unloading of cargo from the Fenella to be undertaken by members of the Armed Forces. She was again the centre of an industrial dispute in December 1917, when dockers at Ramsey, members of the Workers Union, refused to work with non-union dockers.

== Incidents ==
Fenella served the Isle of Man Steam Packet Company for 48 years. Although considered reliable, her long life was not without incident.

- In the early hours of Friday 27 January 1882, whilst making passage from Glasgow to Douglas, the Fenella was involved in a collision with the steamer Peri. The Peri was a wooden screw steamer of 100 gross register tons (GRT). She was registered in Newcastle, and was en route from Abergelly to Glasgow with a cargo of limestone. At a position to the east of Maughold Head, the Peri struck the Fenella amidships. Whilst causing minimal damage to the Fenella, the Peri sustained a significant level of damage and made immediately for Ramsey. The Fenella escorted the Peri into Ramsey.

=== Menai Straights Incident ===
In September 1884 Fenella was involved in an incident in the Menai Strait, Anglesey, which resulted in a protracted and complicated lawsuit. This involved the owners of the steamer Satanella, who laid claims for salvage services which were rendered as a result of the incident.

On Tuesday 9 September 1884, Fenella departed Douglas, Isle of Man, on an excursion bound for the Menai Bridge. Under the command of her master, Captain James Mylchreest, she had 200 excursionists embarked, and reached the Menai Bridge at 15:00 hrs, where she disembarked her passengers. The Bonnie Princess then arrived from Liverpool and so the Fenella cast off the pontoon and proceeded to swing prior to coming to anchor in the part of the straights known as the Swellies. During the course of executing this manoeuvre, Fenella′s starboard bilge struck the Half Tide Rock, where she grounded, and water began to enter the vessel. On realising Fenella′s plight, Captain Mylchreest ordered her port anchor to be lowered and a hawser was got out from her starboard bow and made fast ashore. Soundings were then taken which showed a depth of 10 feet (3 metres) on the starboard quarter, four fathoms (24 feet; 7.3 metres) on the port quarter and seven fathoms (42 feet; 12.8 metres) on either side of the bridge. The sluices were closed and two of Fenella′s lifeboats were lowered into the water.

The tide continued to ebb, causing Fenella to slip and heel over to port, exposing the damage incurred. Captain Mylchreest and his officers inspected the damage and found that a gash had been inflicted on her starboard side that was 10 inches (25.4 cm) long and 1 inch (2.54 cm) wide. The ship's carpenter managed to wedge and plaster the damage with clay so that it was rendered watertight. Two other holes were subsequently discovered on the port side, one seven inches (17.8 cm) long and 1 inch (2.54 cm) wide and the other 15 inches (38.1 cm) long and 1 inch (2.54 cm) wide, which led to the engine room and aft hold respectively. Fenella′s master engaged the services of a pilot in order to assist with the situation, and at 19:00 hours Satanella arrived at the scene.

Satanella was a screw-powered pleasure steamer of 106 gross register tons (GRT). She was operated by the Liverpool, Llandudno and Welsh Coast Steamship Company and owned by Earnest Latham of Liverpool. Satanella had a crew of seven, who were under the command of her master, Captain William Thomas, and was in the process of ferrying passengers between Caernarfon and Beaumaris.

Following discussion between the two masters, it was agreed that the Satanella should take the Fenella under tow when she floated and to proceed to the beach. For this, a consideration of £4 was agreed and this amount was to be paid whether the operation was successful or not. As the tide flowed, the Fenella gradually righted herself and subsequently floated, at which time the Satanella was signaled to come alongside, which she duly did, drawing up on Fenella's port side and made fast. At 23:00 hrs, the Satanella cast off and the Fenella swung to her anchor. After about ten minutes Fenella raised and stowed her anchor and the Satanella commenced the tow. When the vessels were athwart the stream, the Satanella attempted to tow the Fenella to the Anglesey side of the Straights. However, Capt. Mylchreest had reportedly signaled for the tow to be to the Caernarfon shore, as the ebb tide was canting the Fenella's head to the northward. Captain Thomas, however, continued to make for the Anglesey shore, which brought the Fenella into a dangerous situation as the Prince Arthur was laying alongside the Menai Bridge Pontoon. The pilot on board the Fenella signaled to the Satanella to cast off the tow rope, which was carried out, and the rope was hauled back on board the Fenella.

The collision, however, could not be avoided, and Fenella collided with Prince Arthur, causing damage, and Fenella thereupon secured alongside Prince Arthur.

During the course of this, the Satanella had got herself into a dangerous position behind the pontoon, but after approximately thirty minutes she managed again to get a line to the Fenella and proceeded to take her under tow towards the Caernarfon shore.

On coming close to the Caernarfon shore, the Fenella appeared to be at risk of sinking, and the Satanella was signaled to continue towing her further along the shore until a more suitable area could be found for beaching. Fenella subsequently was beached at 01:30 hours on the morning of 10 September. Satanella then stood by after Fenella had grounded, to prevent Fenella from floating up again.

Just before the Satanella departed, Captain Mylchreest offered Captain Thomas the £4 as agreed. Captain Thomas declined the offer, stating that the operation had been much more difficult and taken longer than agreed, and that the matter should be settled between the respective owners.

When word of the Fenella′s plight reached the Isle of Man Steam Packet Company′s headquarters in Douglas, SS Tynwald was despatched to bring back Fenella′s passengers. Tynwald departed Douglas at 20:00 hours, while the passengers were transported by a special train from the bridge to Holyhead, where they were embarked on Tynwald and reached Douglas Harbour in the early hours of Wednesday morning, 10 September.

=== Lawsuit ===
A lawsuit subsequently was filed on behalf of Earnest Latham against the Isle of Man Steam Packet Company, and the hearing was held at the High Court of Justice (Admiralty Division) on Monday, 8 December 1884. Presiding were Mr. Justice Butt and Captains Weller and Barlow (Trinity House Masters). What the court had to decide was whether Satanella had rendered by its actions an act of salvage, or, as was the argument in the case of the defence, that she had merely engaged in assistance to Fenella by giving her a tow. Appearing for the plaintiff were Mr. Myburgh Q.C. and Mr. Rutherford, while appearing for the defendant were Dr. Phillimore Q.C. and Mr. Bucknill.

Prior to commencement of the hearing, the Isle of Man Steam Packet Company again made the offer of £4 to the plaintiff, in respect of the bargain struck, prior to the assistance rendered. The offer was refused.

For the purpose of Marine Salvage Law, the value of the Fenella as per the Isle of Man Steam Packet Company at the time of towage was given as £15,899. Dr. Phillimore asserted that at the time of the incident the water was smooth and the wind was moderate. At no time, he continued, was the Fenella at risk of sinking during the entire incident, and following her beaching the Fenella had floated at every subsequent high tide. She was fitted with watertight doors and the bulkheads, which could be shored if necessary, showed no signs of straining or leakage. The fires of Fenella had been "drawn" before any agreement had been made between the masters of the two vessels and were not lighted before Fenella was beached.

Dr. Phillimore stated that the Isle of Man Steam Packet Company denied each and every one of the allegations made in the statement of claim, and that the defendants alleged that the services rendered were not salvage services but towage only, and in compliance with the contract agreed between the respective masters of the two vessels. He concluded by stating that the defendants had brought to the Court the sum of £200 which they intended to lodge before the Court, and the sum of which should be more than adequate in satisfying the plaintiff′s alleged claim.

Mr. Myburgh Q.C. in his opening statement asserted that the value of Fenella was not £15,899 as the defence has maintained, but a sum of £16,700.

Captain William Thomas was then called on behalf of the plaintiff, who testified that he was en route from Caernarfon to Beaumaris when he saw Fenella, which was stranded on the Half Tide Rock. Captain Thomas stated that there were three pilot districts for the Menai Straights, and that he held a certificate for two of them, but not for the particular part where Fenella was aground. According to Capt. Thomas, at this time the Fenella had no steam and would therefore be in a perilous situation when the tide made, as she would be totally unmanoeuvreable.

Captain Thomas further stated that when Fenella first came off the rocks, her master wanted to beach her on the shore above the George Hotel, and that the appearance of Fenella suggested that she was taking in water, adding to the seriousness of the situation. He continued by saying that on the day in question there was a particularly big tide of 19 feet (5.8 m) (the highest spring tide being 20 feet (6.1 m)), and the tide would run at about 7 knots (13 km/h; 8.1 mph). Having berthed Satanella alongside the landing stage, Capt. Thomas said he took a small boat to the Fenella, together with Mr. Hughes (agent for the Liverpool, Llandudno and Welsh Coast Steamship Company) and a Trinity pilot.

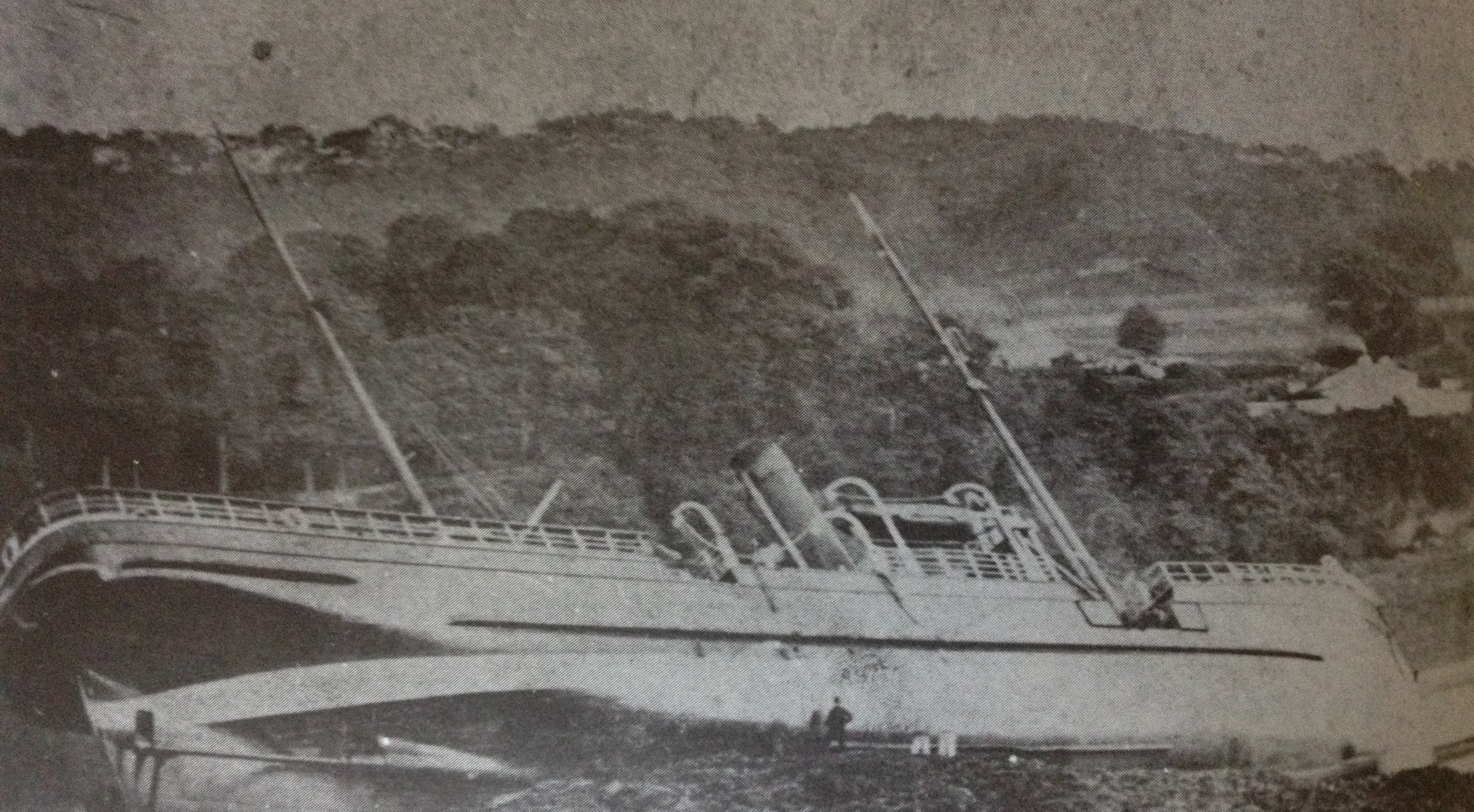
Fenella pictured aground at the Menai Bridge, 9 September 1884.

He said that when they reached the Half Tide Rock they found the Fenella on her port side and her stern very much higher than her head. At this time the tide had begun to make and water had reached the keel of her forward end, with her stern about 12 feet (3.7 m) above the water. Capt. Thomas stated that Capt. Mylchreest then made himself known, and Capt. Thomas enquired as to whether they would require assistance at high water.

Capt. Thomas was then asked by Mr. Myburgh Q.C. as to what reply he received. Capt. Thomas replied that initially Capt. Mylchreest was unsure as to whether he would require assistance. He (Capt. Mylchreest) was of the opinion that the Fenella would float on the tide and that she would swing to her anchor, and they "had steam" which effectively meant that the ship could use her own power. He cited that the ship was watertight and that he was certain no water would enter the ship. Capt. Mylchreest stated his bulkheads were strong and that his watertight doors (sluices) were all lowered. Capt. Thomas then stated that the straights were narrow, and there was a high risk of the Fenella dragging her anchor, and he could lend assistance to help turning the Fenella's head around as she swung on her anchor. Capt. Thomas continued that Capt. Mylchreest said he would accept the offer and that he would also require assistance in beaching the Fenella between the two piers on the Anglesey shore. Capt. Mylchreest requested a price for performing such an undertaking, and Capt. Thomas asserted that he would perform the job for £4.

The weather was calm, and at 22:00 hrs the Satanella made fast alongside the Fenella. Under further cross-examination from Mr. Myburgh Q.C., Capt. Thomas stated that he advised Capt. Mylchreest to slip anchor; however, Capt. Mylchreest stated that he "did not have steam," and this was the first intimation from Capt. Mylchreest that in fact the Fenella did not have steam. Capt. Thomas continued, that after twenty minutes the Fenella came off the rock but the area where Capt. Mylchreest wanted to take her was particularly perilous, more so due to the fact that the Fenella did not have steam and it would therefore fall on the Satanella to position both vessels into the small bay between the piers; a hazardous area peppered with rocks and boulders, and where there were night rafts loaded with timber moored. On his (Capt. Thomas's) strong advice, Capt. Mylchreest agreed that the area was too treacherous and decided a safer option would be to beach the Fenella on the shore at the George Hotel. Capt. Thomas said he could not remember anyone saying that the Fenella was taking in water at that time, but he asserted that from her position in the water it was obvious that she was.

Capt. Thomas claimed that after his discussion with Capt. Mylchreest his initial orders were to take the Fenella to the north-east of the George Hotel, which he proceeded to do. However, he then claimed he received counter orders to take her to the Anglesey shore astern of the Prince Arthur. Capt. Thomas stated that consequently they got caught in a strong counter current which caused the Fenella to start drifting down towards the Prince Arthur, at which time he received the order to let go the tow rope and consequently the Fenella struck the Prince Arthur. Capt. Thomas said the strong current was causing the Satanella problems, as she became embroiled at the far end of the pier and ended up striking several of the barges and a barque.

Capt. Thomas continued, that after about half an hour they managed to get back into a position to lend further assistance, and it was then he heard several voices call that they (the Fenella) were sinking fast. He asserted that this call came from several voices, and although it was dark, he could see that the Fenella was deeply immersed, especially aft, and that the Satanella made fast as soon as possible.

Again Capt. Thomas testified that he advised Capt. Mylchreest that they should make for the Bangor Flats, but again Capt. Mylchreest gave orders to proceed to the George Hotel, an order which Capt. Thomas duly carried out, only to then receive further orders to proceed to the Bangor Flats.

Mr. Myburgh then enquired of Capt. Thomas as to whether the Bangor Flats were the only safe place to take the Fenella, to which Capt. Thomas replied it was.

Capt. Thomas continued that they finally reached the Bangor Flats and the Fenella beached stern first. Following this, the Satanella stayed on station because the current had begun to change.

Just before he departed, Capt. Thomas said he went on board the Fenella, as he wished to tell her master that he could render no further service.

Mr. Myburgh then asked Capt. Thomas of what condition he found the Fenella to be in. Capt. Thomas answered that she was deeply immersed, with water washing over the main deck. However, he stated that he did not look down into her engine room.

Mr. Myburgh then asked Capt. Thomas, that whether he thought in his professional opinion, that in her state, the Fenella could have continued to float; to which Capt. Thomas replied, "No. She would have gone over into five fathoms at low water."

Under cross-examination from Dr. Phillimore, Capt. Thomas was asked whether in fact Capt. Mylchreest had said that it was his (Capt. Thomas's) decision to render assistance to the Fenella, to which Capt. Thomas replied, "No." Dr. Phillimore continued, that did he think in his (Capt. Thomas's) opinion, that the subsequent tow, in which the Fenella was beached at the Bangor Flats rendered an extra service, to which Capt. Thomas replied, "Yes." Capt. Thomas continued that Capt. Mylchreest had offered him £4 after the service was over; and that he (Capt. Thomas) had replied that £4 would not compensate him for the service rendered.

Dr. Phillimore contended that the £4 was in fact the amount agreed upon and it was not an "extra" service, but the service which Capt. Thomas had agreed to undertake.

Dr. Phillimore further argued that if Capt. Thomas was aware that the Fenella had no steam before he commenced the tow, why did he not take it upon himself to insist that the bargain was off, but in fact there was nothing said about the bargain being off until Capt. Thomas went on board the Fenella, after she had been successfully beached. Dr. Phillimore concluded by asking Capt. Thomas, that had indeed the Satanella not been on hand did he agree that the Fenella could have successfully warped herself on to the Caernarfon shore and averted her sinking. Capt. Thomas replied that it may have been possible, if she managed to get a rope out, but that in his opinion she would have foundered.

Capt. Thomas concluded by saying that when the bargain was made he was assured the Fenella had steam up, and that water would be kept out, and that he had no idea that he would have to tow a vessel without steam, with two holes in her and full of water when he made the bargain.

Mr. William Burns, station master and chief boatman of the Coastguard at Bangor; stated that he was on board the Statanella when the towing began, and that the Satanella was ordered to tow towards the George Hotel on the Caernarfonshire side. The Satanella began to tow, but her head canted round to the southward and eastward. The Pilot on board the Fenella then told the Satanella to tow the Fenella below the George Hotel, which was obeyed, and the Satanella took the tow towards the Anglesey shore. Mr. Burns also stated that heard no cries that the "Fenella was sinking."

Mr. John Jeffries, commissioned boatman in the Coastguard confirmed the evidence of Mr. Burns.

Mr. William Bell, chief engineer of the Fenella, then took the stand. He stated that when the Fenella struck the Half Tide Rock, he tried to back her off, but finding he could not he ”drew” his fires. He closed the watertight door in the engine room, and stayed at his station until the fires went out. Bell then left the vessel and went on board again after about half an hour. He continued that it would have taken roughly an hour to make steam and when the tide began to make water did start to enter the Fenella in the region of the stoke hold, but he did nothing to stop it. Bell then stated that the water was also in the after compartment. Bell was then asked whether he received any order to get up steam, to which he replied, "No."

Roberts, a boatman from Bangor, then gave his evidence. He asserted that when the Fenella floated off the rock and the Satanella began the tow the Fenella went head to the southward, and then as she (the Fenella) had no power her head was canted round. She then went northward against the Prince Arthur. Roberts also attested that he heard no shouting from the Fenella.

First Officer William Woods of the Fenella then gave his evidence. He stated that the orders which were given were to beach the Fenella on the Caernarfon side near the George Hotel; but instead of that she was towed head towards the Menai Bridge. First Officer Woods then continued that orders were subsequently given from the Fenella to take the tow towards the George Hotel, and no orders were given to proceed towards the Anglesey shore. Under cross-examination from Mr. Myburgh, First Officer Woods insisted that no orders were given to the Satanella to port her helm at any time and the tow took the Fenella’s head towards the bridge, which was the wrong way.

Mr. Myburgh then addressed the court, summing up the evidence, and referring to decided cases in support of the case which he contended had been made out on behalf of the owners of the Satanella.

Dr. Phillimore, on behalf of the Isle of Man Steam Packet Company, then contended that the services rendered by the Satanella were no greater than those agreed to be carried out for the sum of £4. Dr. Phillimore asserted that Capt. Thomas had admitted that a great deal had been done for the £4 and it was a hard bargain. The plaintiffs may have had the £200 which had been offered, but they chose not to. Dr. Phillimore then cited various agencies that supported his assertion that the services rendered were towage services, not salvage services, nor even a towage-salvage service, that the evidence showed that the Fenella could have been warped off and beached without the assistance of the Satanella, and it was not represented to Capt. Thomas that the Fenella was not making water, or that she would use her own steam.

At the conclusion of Dr. Phillimore’s address, Mr. Justice Butt gave his judgement.

He stated that the reason for the Fenella becoming stranded on the Half Tide Rock was not in dispute, and added that there was a serious risk to the vessel. The course of events had brought Capt. Mylchreest and Capt. Thomas together and there was undoubtedly an agreement made between the two gentlemen for rendering some services, which although not described in exactly the same way by the pleadings of the respective parties, were services which he had cause to find were substantially towage services rendered by the Satanella to the Fenella.

That Capt. Thomas had sworn that it was expressly stated to him at the time, that the Fenella had use of her own engines and her own steam; but that assertion was flatly denied by the Isle of Man Steam Packet Company, and it was difficult to decide which of those two accounts was the correct one. However, given the comparison in size between the two vessels it would be fair to assume that Capt. Thomas would expect the Fenella to be able to assist the Satanella during the course of the action, by producing assistance by way of power, and that he was now of the opinion that it was not the intention of Capt. Mylchreest to assist by way of having steam and developing her own power by way of the fact that the Fenella was taking in water so fast that it would be almost impossible to get steam in her boilers because when she floated it was found that the stoke hold was full of water as well as the after hold.

That the fact was clear, in the situation which developed, that a state of a consideration of £4 could not be upheld; and therefore the question arose of what sort of payment would be considered fair for the services rendered. Mr. Justice Butt continued that there were conflicting accounts of the orders delivered from the Fenella to the Satanella, and that there could have been a mistake or misconception of what passed between the Masters of the two ships, and stated that there appeared to be no evidence to suggest any misconduct on behalf of the crew of the Satanella and the fact was clear that by lending assistance the crew of the Satanella had put themselves in a position of considerable danger, and that in their task the crew had performed manfully.

That there was also no dispute that when the Fenella was beached that her after hold and stoke hold were filled with water and that it was highly probable that the Fenella may well have sunk had it not been for the assistance given by the Satanella.

Mr. Justice Butt concluded by stating that the £200 lodged before the Court by the Isle of Man Steam Packet Company could not be considered as adequate recompense, and that he was awarding £300 in favour of the owners of the Satanella, plus costs.

Following initial repairs the Fenella then underwent more comprehensive repair work at Messrs Jack & Co, of Liverpool.

She returned to service on Monday 29 September, when she left Liverpool at 06:00 hrs for the sailing to Douglas. Following her return to service, Fenella was placed on the Ramsey Station.

=== Other incidents ===
- On Saturday 8 November 1884 a serious accident occurred on board the Fenella, as she made passage from Douglas to Liverpool. The weather for the passage was very stormy, and her decks were frequently swept by the sea. On one occasion, an elderly passenger, John Brown, of Withington, Manchester, was struck by the sea and knocked against the side railings of the vessel, with the result that one of his legs was broken. First aid was administered, and he was transferred to a cabin until the Fenella reached Liverpool. All the passengers, except Mr. Brown, were landed at the Princes Landing Stage, and then the Fenella proceeded to the Queen’s Half-tide Dock, where he was conveyed to an ambulance, and taken to the Northern Hospital. Also during the course of the passage, a young man was knocked against the side of the vessel, and received a severe blow to the head.
- On Saturday 10 May 1890 Fenella departed Liverpool at 09:00 hrs bound for Ramsey. As she was approaching Ramsey, one of her crankshafts suffered a mechanical failure, and thus disabled one of her engines. She completed passage under her own steam, arriving at Ramsey at 15:00 hrs. The following day she made passage to Liverpool on one engine, and then underwent repairs, returning to service after 10 days.
- On the morning of Monday 10 February 1896, under the command of Captain Reid, Fenella departed Liverpool at 11:30 hrs on a scheduled sailing to Douglas. As she passed the Northwest light ship, her port shaft suffered a fracture. Not being able to effect repairs, the vessel hove to, whilst the propeller was secured. Inbound to Liverpool, the Peveril received a signal from her sister, explaining her plight, and was able to convey the information upon reaching port. This was relayed to Douglas via telegraph to the headquarters of the Isle of Man Steam Packet Company. Fenella continued en route to Douglas under the power of her starboard engine, arriving in Douglas at 19:40 hrs. As a consequence of the damage to Fenella, the Snaefell was put into commission, and operated the following morning's sailing to Liverpool. The Fenella also proceeded to Liverpool the following morning, under her own power, in order for her repairs to be undertaken.

=== Fenella Mystery ===
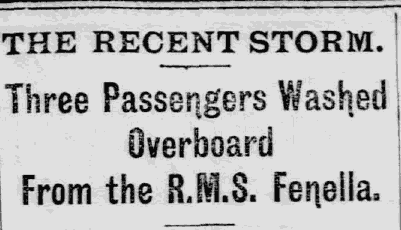
- Headline in the Mona's Herald, Wednesday 11 January 1899, concerning the loss of three passengers from the RMS Fenella.
  On Monday 2 January 1899, under the command of Capt. Hill, the Fenella departed Liverpool at 11:30 hrs for Douglas, during the course of which she encountered severe weather with winds reported to be reaching Hurricane Force 12 resulting in a passage time of 8 hours. At a dog show which was taking place at the palace, Douglas, various rumours began to circulate when the Fenella was known to be overdue, and these increased to reports that the Douglas Lifeboat had been dispatched in order to meet the vessel; only for these reports to turn out to be baseless. On reaching Douglas, many passengers recounted their stories of the voyage to local newspapers. Accounts were given of people being thrown from their berths, and one lady being thrown across a cabin, sustaining cuts to her face. In the steerage section passengers were reportedly locked in to their accommodation, with some sustaining injury as fixtures such as heavy furniture became dislodged.

It was reported that at the time of departure, whilst the weather was blustery, it was not sufficient for Capt. Hill to decide against making passage. The Fenella departed Liverpool on time and, exiting the Victoria Channel, she passed the Bar Light Ship, whereupon she set a course for Douglas. As the Fenella cleared to the northwest of Liverpool Bay, the weather worsened, and what was reported to be "one of the worst storms in many years" developed, with the wind blowing from the northwest, creating associated sleet and hail squalls. Reports stated that passengers on the deck were advised by the ship’s crew to go below due to the severity of the weather, but several passengers declined to do this, some seeking shelter on a covered seat aft of the funnel. According to a witness, Mr. Tom Wood, two passengers returned to the deck, (Mr. John Mc Combe and a young woman, Miss Janie Clucas), who joined three men believed to be the victims, sitting on the covered seat. Wood then stated that a wave crashed over the port beam of the Fenella with such force that it swept away the seat, dispersing its occupants, with the result that Mc Combe and Miss Clucas were washed up opposite the saloon door. Having both sustained injuries, they were taken into the saloon, where treatment was administered, and they stayed in the saloon for the remainder of the voyage.

No exact eyewitness account exists regarding the loss of the passengers, but Wood stated that he did not see anything of the other occupants again, saying that he thought they’d taken shelter in another part of the vessel, and that it never occurred to him that they may have been washed overboard. He further stated that this occurred at approximately 15:30 hrs, and although visibility was poor it was not dark. Another passenger on board, Mr. Wightman (referred to as a commercial traveller), stated during the course of an interview with the Mona’s Herald that he was on the deck at the time when the incident occurred. Wightman stated that what was referred to as the "ladies shelter" was taken by the wave, but this was at a position further aft than from where he was standing. Wightman then continued that he stayed in that sheltered part of the vessel just aft of the funnel for the remainder of the voyage, being adequately sheltered by the funnel. Wightman further stated that when the sea came aboard the area in which he was standing was at least 1 foot (0.30 m) deep in water. The wave appeared to strike further aft than where he was, and the sea "probably" fell with all its force right on the shelter, which was swept away. Wightman continued that no one was ordered below until the shelter had been washed away, as the situation was then described as "unsafe." Wightman concluded by saying that, to his recollection, six people were seated on the seat when the Fenella departed Liverpool; only for one person to leave after approximately 2 hours, and for the other person to leave after the announcement was made to go below. Mr. John Mc Combe, during the course of his interview, stated that after passing the Bar Lightship both he and Miss Clucas took their place in the shelter just in front of the saloon, and in the shelter there were four other persons. One of the passengers, Mc Combe said, was suffering from severe sea sickness. Mc Combe continued that at approximately 15:30 hrs a big wave came over from the port or windward side of the vessel and swept them all away. He stated that there was a tremendous body of water and he couldn't be certain as to whether it smashed the seat or carried it away. Mc Combe further stated that at that time he was temporarily stunned, having been struck on the head by a dislodged fixture. Two men who had been standing at the top of the saloon staircase dragged both Mc Combe and Miss Clucas in, and Mc Combe concluded by saying after the occurrence he did not see any of the other passengers which had been in the shelter again and that, contrary to reports, none of the ship’s company had suggested that the passengers should go below.

Over the following days after reaching Douglas, initially one but subsequently three of the passengers embarked on the Fenella were discovered to be missing. These were later confirmed to be William Quayle, Frederick White and Joseph Scarrat.

William Quayle was originally from the Isle of Man but at the time was residing in Liverpool where he was employed as a schoolmaster. He had spent Christmas on the island with his father and sisters but returned to Liverpool in order to seek an extension of leave. This was granted, and Quayle purchased a ticket to return to the Isle of Man on the Fenella. When Quayle failed to arrive back at his father’s house that Monday night, it was assumed by the family that he had decided not to take passage as a consequence of the weather. However, on Wednesday a letter reached the house of Quayle’s father, which had been sent by Quayle’s wife in Liverpool; who had become anxious when she had not heard from him. Quayle’s sister decided to open the letter, which was indeed from his wife, inquiring why she had not heard from him and enquiring if there was anything wrong with him. Quayle’s sister contacted Capt. Keig, (Master of the Empress Queen and a family relative), to see if he could find any information about her brother. Capt. Keig subsequently found that there was luggage belonging to William Quayle which remained unclaimed at the Douglas offices. A press representative went to the Steam Packet Company offices for an official statement but could obtain none. This led to further rumour circulating, and subsequently leading to the discovery of another two missing persons.

Isle of Man Examiner Headline, regarding the loss of the three passengers.

Both White and Scarrat were what was described at that time as commercial travellers and were from Warrington and Tranmere respectively. In the case of White, the alarm was raised when he failed to attend a meeting as scheduled. Another salesman who was staying at the Athol Hotel reported to the hotel manager that White had failed to attend the meeting, and the manager then became suspicious when White had not taken the room which had been booked for him, and that luggage belonging to him had arrived at the hotel. A similar situation applied to Scarrat, who was staying at the nearby Villiers Hotel. In early March the body of William Quayle was picked up off Fleetwood by the crew of a fishing boat. On 7 March the badly decomposed body of a man, subsequently identified as that of Frederick White, was also picked up by the crew of a Fleetwood fishing boat. The body of Joseph Scarrat was never officially found. However, on 21 February, the trunk of a man was washed ashore at Douglas, but the state of decomposition was such that it could not be identified. It could have been that of Scarrat, or a Douglas publican, George Warner, who had been missing since the previous December.

- On Saturday 27 May 1899, Fenella was tasked to operate a sailing between Peel and Liverpool to transport troops of the 8th Lancashire Artillery Volunteers (TA), for their return from a summer camp. Departing at 11:00 hrs, the Fenella was passing to the south of the Calf of Man, when a bracket on one of her propeller shafts broke, and she was consequently left with only one of her two screws available for propulsion. This would have meant arriving at Liverpool approximately 3 hours behind schedule.Capt. Faragher, therefore, decided to divert the Fenella to Douglas so that the soldiers could be transferred to another vessel. But the Tynwald had already departed Douglas, when the partly disabled Fenella arrived off Douglas Head. The Fenella managed to attract the Tynwald's attention, by sounding her whistle and running various flag signals from her masts. Consequently, the Tynwald returned to Douglas, whereupon the soldiers were transferred, and the Tynwald departed for Liverpool.
- On Wednesday 21 November 1900, the Fenella departed Douglas at 09:00 hrs on a regular service to Liverpool. As Fenella cleared to the southeast of Douglas Bay she developed problems with her discharge pipe, as a consequence of the condenser being choked. Fenella had been moored in the outer harbour at Douglas the previous night, and refuse discharges from a hopper barge had been washed up by the incoming tide, choking the pipe. The problem was quickly rectified, and the Fenella returned to service.
- Several weeks later on Christmas Day 1900, whilst making passage from Liverpool to Douglas, Fenella’s discharge pipes again became clogged. This required to Fenella to come to anchor to the northwest of the Bar Lightship, whilst the situation was dealt with, delaying her arrival into Douglas by two hours.
- In October 1901 the Fenella again went aground, this time in Luce Bay. On Tuesday 1 October 1901 Fenella departed Douglas in low visibility bound for Glasgow. Under the command of Captain Hodgson, she had some 200 passengers embarked, many of them Manx who were travelling to attend the Glasgow International Exhibition. The fog thickened, and at approximately 10:00 hrs the Fenella went aground in a sandy cove in Luce Bay, known as Maryport, a few miles inside the point of the Mull of Galloway. The vessel could not be backed off, as the tide had begun to ebb and this consequently left the Fenella aground. However, no damage had been incurred during the grounding, and the Fenella was re-floated on the following morning’s tide, when she then proceeded to Drummore Harbour.
- On Tuesday 12 November 1901, shortly after departing Douglas en route to Liverpool, the Fenella went to the assistance of a small boat which turned out to be the Primrose of Whitehaven, Cumberland, and which was in difficulty, having lost her mast. There was a gale blowing, which meant that the Fenella could not lower one of her own boats in order to render assistance, and therefore the three men aboard the Primrose (the skipper, his son and a deck hand), had to be literally picked off the drifting vessel. The Fenella's Master, Capt. Thomas Roberts, is recorded as having exhibited fine seamanship in his handling of the Fenella, and following the rescue the three crew members of the Primrose were taken to Liverpool.
- On Wednesday 5 December 1906, Fenella sustained damage as she made passage from Liverpool to Douglas. In a north-westerly storm with associated squalls, damage was sustained to parts of the bridge, washing away the binnacle on the bridge and breaking glass in the front part of the wheelhouse. No one was injured, and the damage did not disable the vessel; however, the passage time was increased to over eight hours. Over the course of the night all damage was repaired at Douglas, and the Fenella resumed her schedule the following morning.
- In April 1911, what was described as the "mysterious death" of the Fenella’s second officer, James Robinson, occurred in Liverpool. The Fenella had docked at the Coburg Dock, Liverpool, early in the hours of Saturday 8 April, after which the ship’s company retired. Nothing more was seen of Second Officer Robinson on board. When the crew took breakfast, the absence of Second Officer Robinson was noted by First Officer Williams, who made enquiries as to Second Officer Robinson’s whereabouts. It was generally surmised that he had gone ashore to attend mass. First Officer Williams went ashore at 10:00 hrs, and was in a dockside warehouse when a policeman approached him. The police officer informed First Officer Williams that the body of a man had been recovered from the river, dressed in an Isle of Man Steam Packet Company uniform, and he had been taken to the Southern Hospital. First Officer Williams travelled to the hospital, where he was informed that a man had been admitted having been saved from drowning in the river by the crew of a flat, and that he was unconscious. First Officer Williams returned to the hospital three times during the day; however, Second Officer Robinson did not regain consciousness, and subsequently died the following morning, Sunday. At the Inquest into his death, it was stated that Second Officer Robinson had been rescued at the Duke's Dock, a considerable distance from where the Fenella was located, in the Coburg Dock; and therefore the chance that he had fallen off the Fenella was dismissed. The conclusion was drawn, that after attending mass Second Officer Robinson had gone for a walk along the riverside, and had accidentally fallen in. At the time of his death, James Robinson was aged 62, and had been in the employ of the Steam Packet for 40 years. His body was returned to Douglas on board the Tynwald, and he was subsequently buried at Douglas Borough Cemetery.
- On Thursday 28 August 1919, a passenger who had reportedly been suffering from mental illness collapsed and died on the Prince’s Landing Stage, after disembarking from the Fenella following passage from Douglas. Harry Wyatt was a publican from Warrington, and had been visiting the Isle of Man with his son, where they stayed at Cunningham’s Camp. Wyatt was reported to have become delirious and had ultimately stabbed himself. Following treatment from a doctor, it was decided to return Wyatt to Warrington, and both he and his 14-year-old son embarked on the Fenella. During the course of the passage, Wyatt was again reported to have become violent, and was required to be restrained in his bunk by members of the crew.
- On Sunday 10 October 1920, a passenger on board the Fenella jumped into Ramsey Harbour, and was consequently saved by the endeavours of a policeman. Lawrence Watson, who was described as suffering from mental illness, jumped into the harbour after the vessel had berthed at Ramsey, and was reported as being in imminent danger of drowning. Constable Edmund Brindle jumped into the harbour after Watson, and subsequently rescued him. At a meeting of the Royal Humane Society, at their Trafalgar Square Headquarters on 9 November 1920, it was unanimously resolved that Constable Brindle be decorated for his selfless act. Constable Brindle was presented with his certificate by the Isle of Man's Chief Constable, Colonel Madoc, at an Award Ceremony on New Year's Eve, 1920.

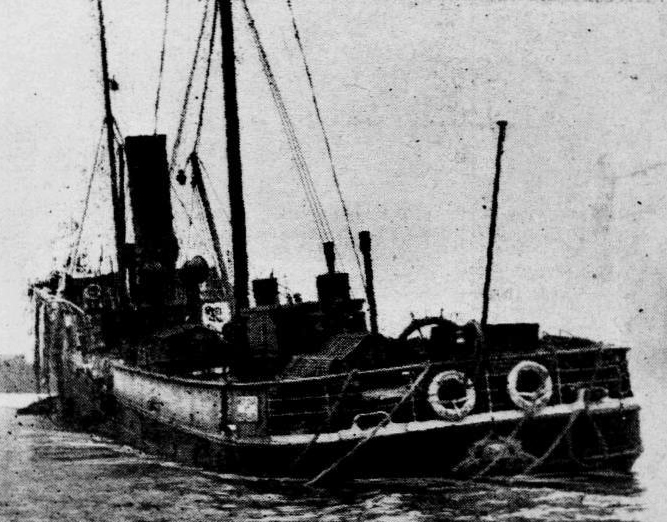
Fenella pictured beached aground on the Tranmere Bight, February 1923.

- In February 1923 the Fenella collided with the ocean liner Clan Cumming in low visibility on the River Mersey, sustaining damage, and was subsequently beached. The Fenella had left Douglas in stormy conditions on Sunday 18 February, with passengers and a cargo of livestock. She arrived at the Prince’s Landing Stage later that night, and discharged her passengers and cargo. Following this she proceeded to anchor in the Mersey, and it was during the course of this manoeuvre that she struck the stem of the Clan Liner, Clan Cumming, and sustained substantial damage to her port quarter. The Clan Cumming was a vessel of 4,804 gross register tons (GRT) and 400 feet (120 m) feet in length. She was lying at anchor in the Mersey at the time of the collision, following which she sustained slight damage to her stem, but was subsequently able to dock. Following the collision a hole was torn in the side of the Fenella, and her Master, Capt. Lee, not knowing the full extent of the damage, took the decision to beach the vessel on the Tranmere Bight. Fenella’s crew were then taken off by the Dock Board boat, Salvor; however, Capt. Lee stayed with the vessel. The Fenella was inspected by the company’s Marine Superintendent Mr. J. Kelly, who supervised temporary repairs, but the findings were that the damage was considerably worse than at first thought, and the Fenella remained beached at Tranmere until the following Thursday afternoon. She was subsequently floated and taken to the dry dock at Cammell Laird’s for further repairs to be undertaken. Following her dry docking, Fenella had her damage repaired and underwent a substantial overhaul as a result of the collision. According to Lloyd's List, this repair work took six weeks and included renewal of her boliers, cylinders and steam pipes, and the making good to damage sustained to public rooms and accommodation as a consequence of them being immersed in salt water for several days. Damage to the Clan Cumming was comparatively slight; however, she was also taken to a dry dock, where her stem plating was removed, and her twisted stem straightened. Fenella re-entered service on Friday 20 April.
- On the night of Saturday 12 January 1924, another crew member of the Fenella was involved in a fatal accident whilst the vessel was berthed in Coburg Dock, Liverpool. Seaman Robert Bridson was killed whilst making his way on board, having slipped and fallen into the water. At the Inquest Fenella's Master, Capt. Clucas, stated that Bridson along with another sailor named Kelly, had left the Fenella shortly after she had arrived at 20:00 hrs and both men returned at 21:00 hrs. Seaman Kelly on noticing that Bridson was missing raised the alarm, and all hands were subsequently on deck. Another sailor, also by the name of Bridson, lowered himself over the side of the ship on a rope, where he found the deceased lying face down on the top of the water. The body was recovered, and artificial respiration was carried out by the chief first aid officer of the police division, who had arrived on the scene, before the body was removed to the Southern Hospital. At the time of his death, Robert Bridson was 74 and had been employed by the steam packet for many years, being one of their oldest employees. He had served on the Snaefell during the Great War and was at the Landing at Suvla Bay. Bridson and another company sailor, Mylchreest, had been invalided home before the Snaefell was torpedoed.

== Disposal ==
As her time in service drew to a close, Fenella continued to be an integral part of the company's operation. One of her final tasks was to inaugurate a service between the Isle of Man and Workington. However, this service commenced on Saturday 29 June 1929, a week earlier than originally planned. As a consequence of this earlier date, it was the Tynwald which took the inaugural sailing, thereby replacing the Fenella. Over subsequent weeks the Fenella performed tender services to the Royal Holland Line ship, Gelria, when the latter called at Douglas on 15 July 1929, and ferried a company of the Boy's Brigade to the Isle of Man from Workington on Wednesday 7 August.

On Wednesday 21 August Fenella became the first Isle of Man Steam Packet Company vessel to operate from the Irish port of Donaghadee, when she brought 500 day-trip excursionists to Douglas.

In some quarters it was hoped to retain the Fenella along with the Mona's Queen so that they could form part of the forthcoming Centenary Celebrations scheduled for the Isle of Man Steam Packet Company in 1930. However, the two vessels were offered for sale at the end of August, being subsequently inspected by representatives of a Dutch firm of shipbrokers and also by shipbrokers from Ardrossan.

Fenella's final sailing in revenue service took place on Saturday 7 September, when she concluded the season's schedule between Douglas and Workington.

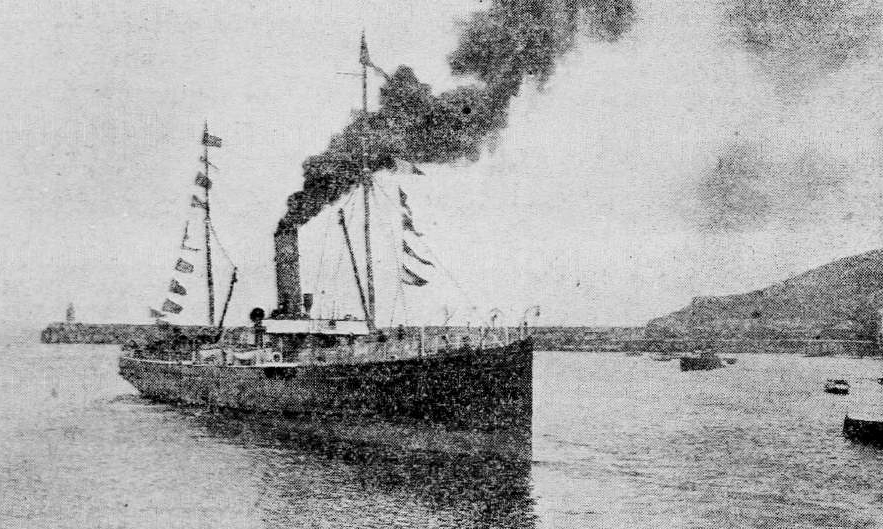
Fenella pictured departing Douglas for the final time; Monday 9 September 1929.

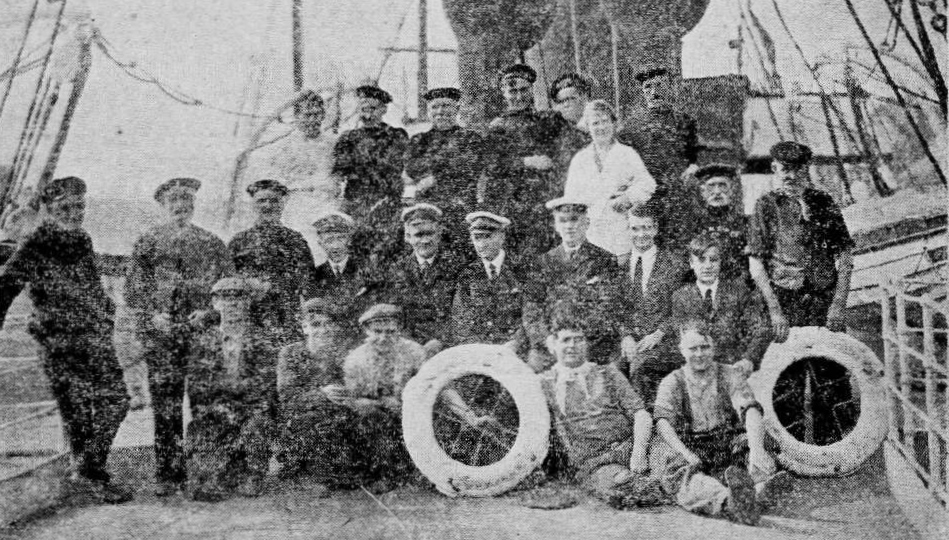
The ship's company of the RMS Fenella, pictured prior to her final voyage from Douglas, Isle of Man; Monday 9 September 1929

Fenella left her home port Douglas, Isle of Man, for the final time on the afternoon of Monday 9 September, under the command of Capt. Wilfred Qualtrough, bound for Morpeth Dock, Birkenhead, to be laid up. As she departed the Double Corner, it was reported that she had flags flying from her masts and received rousing salutes from her steam packet sisters and the steamer Glen Strathallan, with the Fenella duly returning the compliment.

Both the Fenella and the Mona’s Queen were offered at auction by Messers C. W. Kellock at the Cunard Building, Liverpool, on Thursday 27 September, and it was reported that the auction was well attended. Bidding for the Fenella commenced at £1,000, with the final bid placed at £2,290.

After 48 eventful years with the company, Fenella was purchased by Mr. John Cashmore, and broken up at Newport, Monmouthshire.

== Trivia ==
A mystery was created six weeks on from her sale, in November 1929, when one of Fenella's lifeboats was washed ashore at Barmouth in Cardigan Bay following a gale. Inscribed on the lifeboat were the words "SS Fenella, Douglas," and within the boat were several pairs of oilskins. It transpired that as well as purchasing the Fenella at the auction, John Cashmore had also purchased the Liverpool dredger, the Brancker, which was also destined for scrapping. When the Brancker had left the Mersey under tow from a tug, one of the Fenella's lifeboats had been placed aboard her. During the course of the tow, the Brancker broke adrift in a gale, forcing the four men on board her to take to the lifeboat. After several hours the men were rescued by the steamer, City of Lyons, and the lifeboat was then cast adrift, subsequently ending up being washed ashore at Barmouth.

== Official number and code letters ==
Official numbers are issued by individual flag states. They should not be confused with IMO ship identification numbers. Fenella had the UK Official Number 76303 and used the Code Letters J C T G.

== Sources ==
- Chappell, Connery (1980). Island Lifeline. T. Stephenson & Sons Ltd. ISBN 0-901314-20-X.
