= SS Douglas (1889) =

Isle of Man Steam Packet Company packet steamer

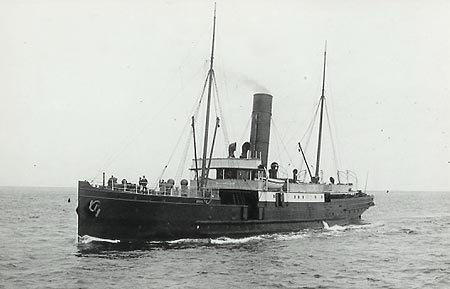
- RMS Douglas

History
- Name: 1889: Dora; 1901: Douglas
- Owner: 1889–1901: London and Southwestern Railway Company; 1901–1923: IOMSPCo
- Operator: 1889–1901: London and Southwestern Railway Company; 1901-1923: IOMSPCo.
- Port of registry: Douglas, Isle of Man
- Route: Douglas – Liverpool, Whitehaven, Fleetwood.
- Builder: Robert Napier & Co.
- Launched: 2 March 1889
- In service: 1889
- Out of service: 1923
- Identification: Official number 94515; Code Letters: LCGW
- Fate: Sunk in the River Mersey following a collision with 16 August 1923

General characteristics
- Type: Packet steamer
- Tonnage: 774 GRT
- Length: 240 ft (73 m)
- Beam: 30 ft (9.1 m)
- Depth: 15 ft (4.6 m)
- Speed: 15 knots (28 km/h; 17 mph)
- Capacity: 506 passengers
- Crew: 33

SS (RMS) Douglas (III) – the third vessel in the line's history to bear the name – was a packet steamer which entered service with the London and South Western Railway in 1889 under the name Dora until she was purchased by the Isle of Man Steam Packet Company in 1901 for £13,500.

== Description ==
Douglas was a steel-built, single-screw vessel constructed by Robert Napier & Co. of Glasgow. She was assessed at 774 gross register tons (GRT) and had a length of 240 ft 0 in (73.2 m), a beam of 30 ft 0 in (9.1 m) and a depth of 15 ft 2 in (4.6 m). Douglas had a certificated accommodation for 506 passengers and a crew of 33. Napier were also responsible for her engines and boilers.

== Service life ==
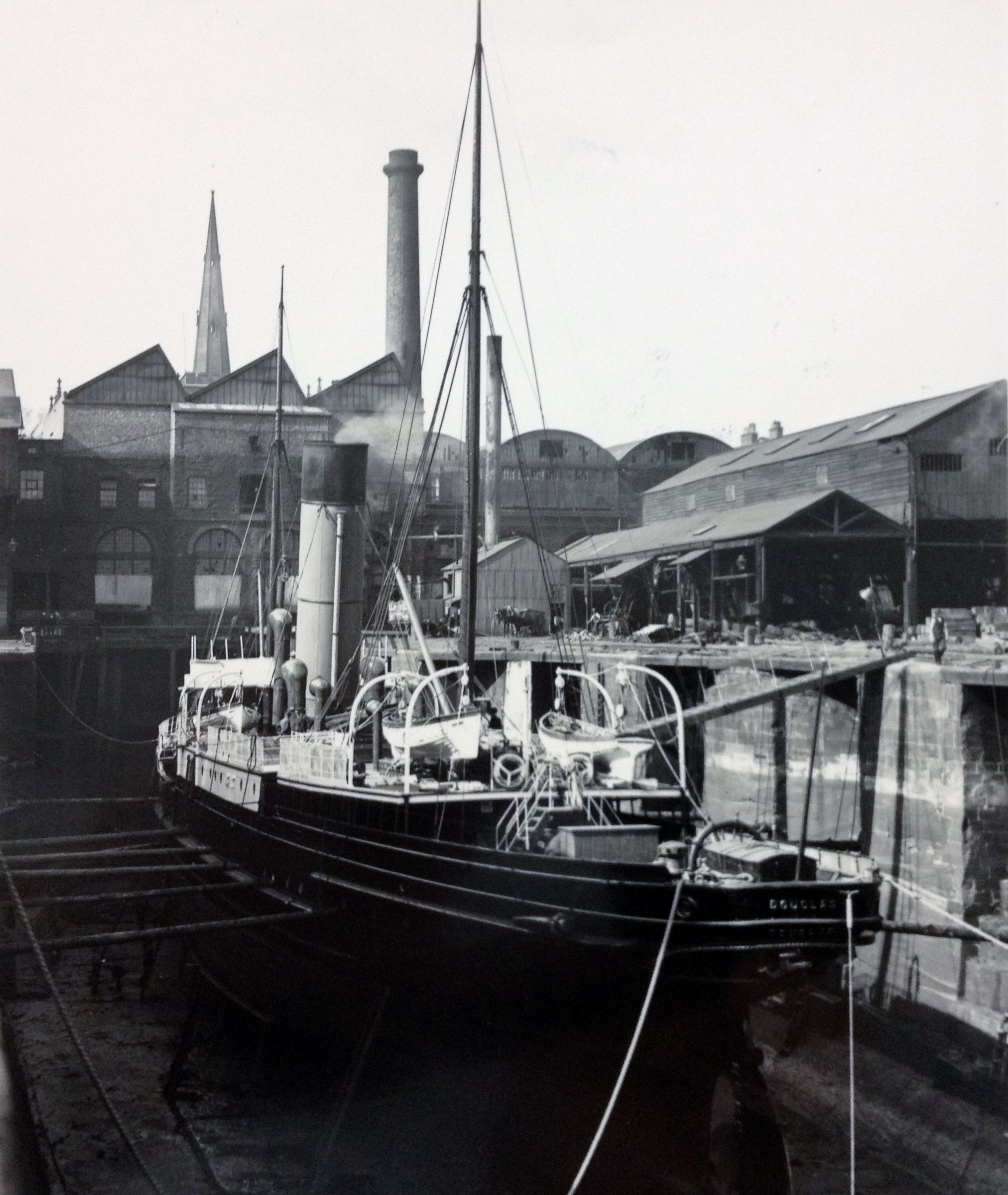
Douglas pictured in drydock at Birkenhead

Douglas was a departure in Steam Packet practice. Until 1901 all its ships had been ordered and built for it, with the exception of the two eminently suitable vessels Prince of Wales and Queen Victoria which had been bought in after their owners had unsuccessfully tilted at the Manx trade. Douglas, however, was a straight purchase to fill the gap left when Peveril was sunk in 1899. The ship had been working the Southampton service to the Channel Islands and was thus very well suited to the Irish Sea trade.

In November 1903, she collided with, and sank, the steamer City of Lisbon in the Mersey.

Douglas was designed to carry a mixture of passengers and cargo. Her designation as a Royal Mail Ship (RMS) indicated that she carried mail under contract with the Royal Mail. A specified area was allocated for the storage of letters, parcels and specie (bullion, coins and other valuables). In addition, there was a considerable quantity of regular cargo, ranging from furniture to foodstuffs and even motor cars. Douglas was used for winter services to and from the island, and throughout World War I, playing a valuable part in maintaining the island's lifeline.

On 7 September 1911, Douglas ran aground in the River Mersey as she completing passage from Douglas to Liverpool. Having left Douglas at midnight on Wednesday, by the time Douglas arrived in the Queen's Channel a fog had lowered visibility, resulting in her running aground near the Crosby Lightship. Douglas heeled over to port slightly, but righted as the tide made. She subsequently refloated, and arrived into Liverpool at 08:30.

=== Sinking ===
On 16 August 1923, Douglas pulled out of the Brunswick Dock in the River Mersey at the start of her voyage to Douglas. As she proceeded down river towards the sea, she attempted to cross the bow of Artemisia, a ship of 5,731 tons which was inward bound to Liverpool with a cargo of sugar from Java.

Artemisia struck Douglas amidships but the duty officer of Artemisia prevented any loss of life by keeping his engines going, and holding his bows into the Douglas' side, so keeping her afloat until all crew and the 15 passengers were taken off safely. The Douglas then sank (at 53°23′0″N 3°01′0″W) and her wreck was destroyed nearly four months later.

The collision was followed by a lengthy and expensive legal wrangle in which it revealed that the Artmisia was waiting her turn to enter the dock and was lying a thousand feet off the entrance with just sufficient seaway to stem the flood tide. The Douglas left the dock, turned into the tidal water intending to go around the larger ship. The issue turned to one of seamanship and the Admiralty Court held that the Douglas was alone to blame. The case was heard on 5 June 1924. The Steam Packet appealed against the decision and the appeal was allowed. This time the Artemisia was held to blame. Then came the final appeal to the House of Lords. The successful appeal was dismissed and their Lordships reversed the findings of the Appeal Court. The responsibility of the collision rested solely on the Douglas.

== Gallery ==
RMS Douglas
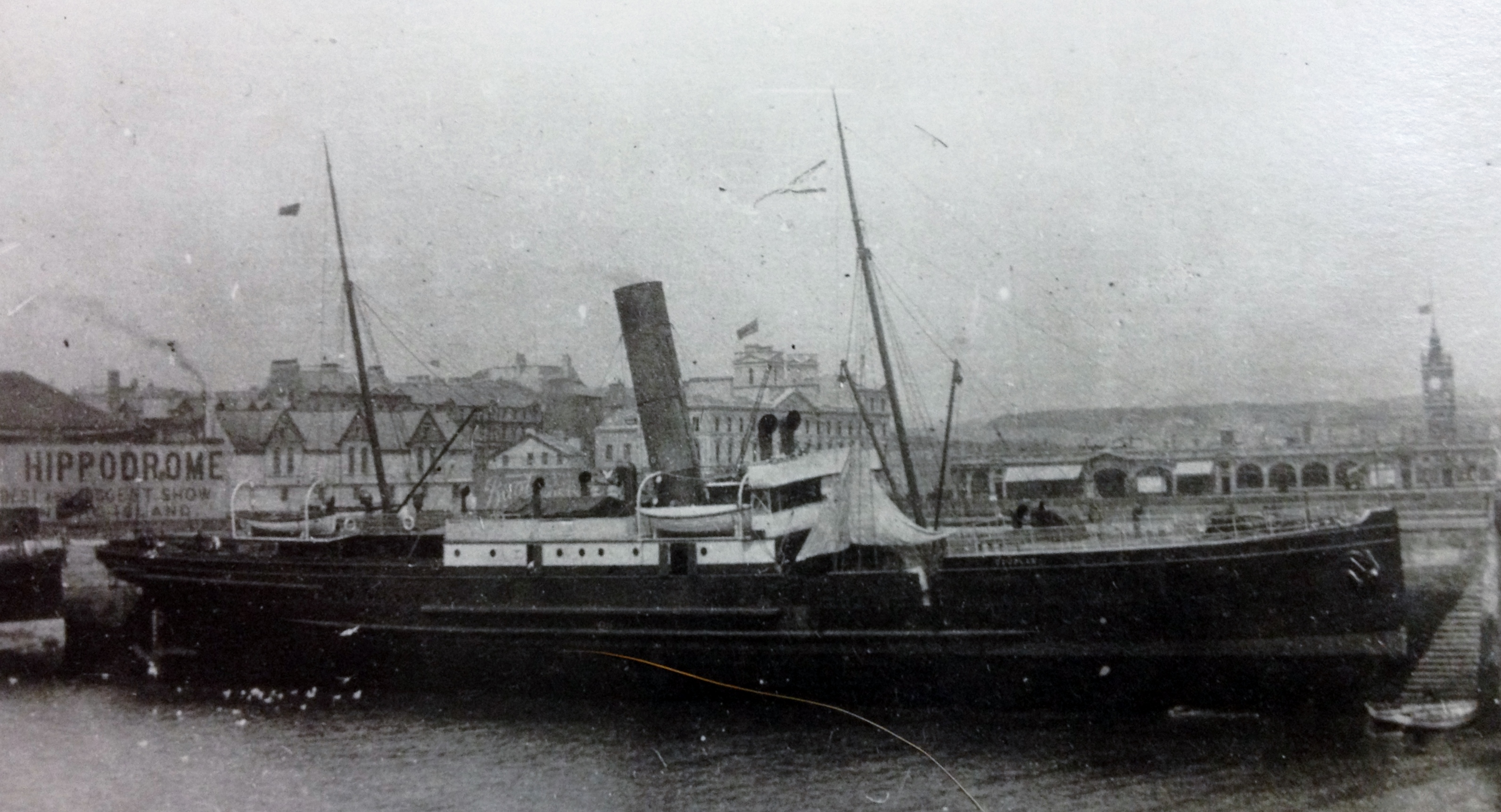
Douglas berthed at the Red Pier, Douglas.

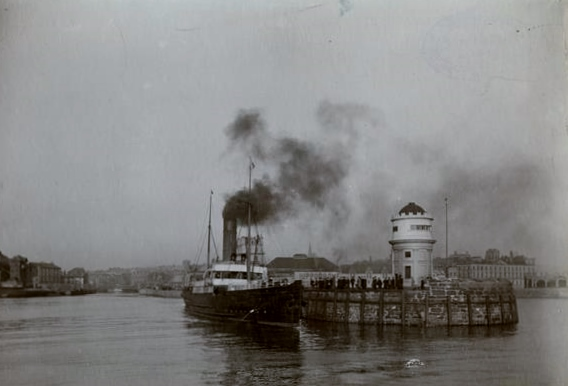
Douglas passing the Red Pier as she leaves Douglas.

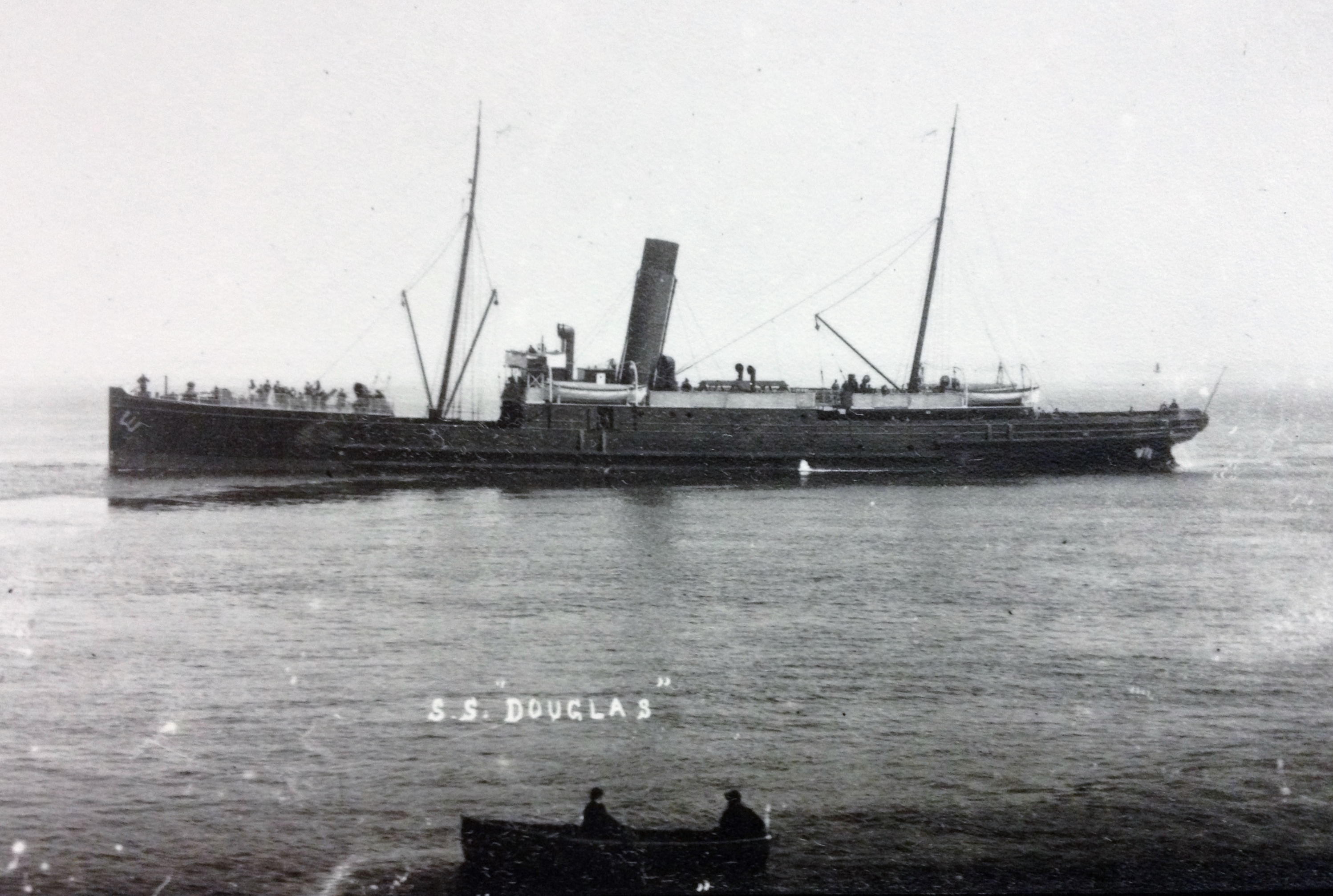
Douglas pictured in Douglas Bay.

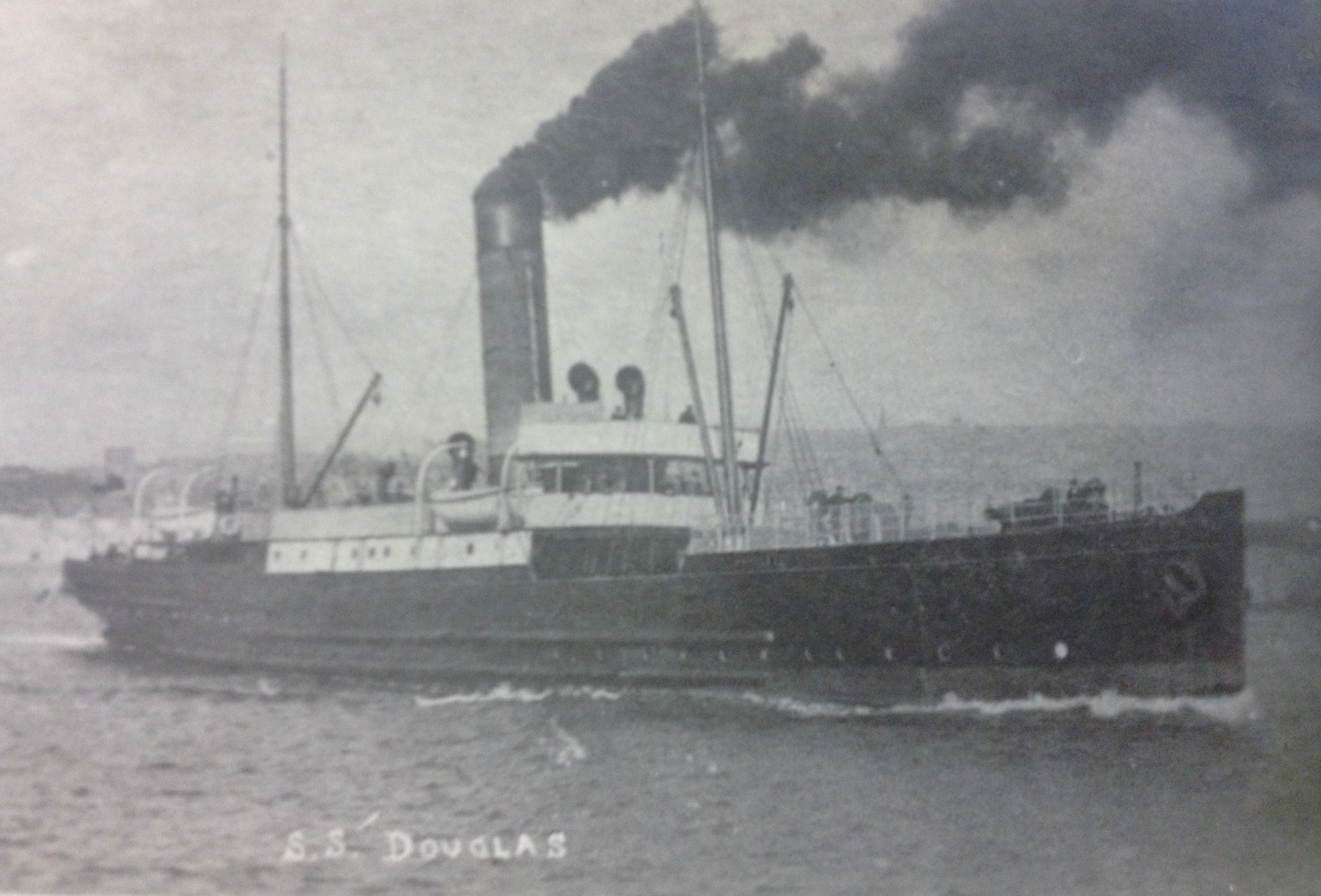
Douglas departing Douglas.

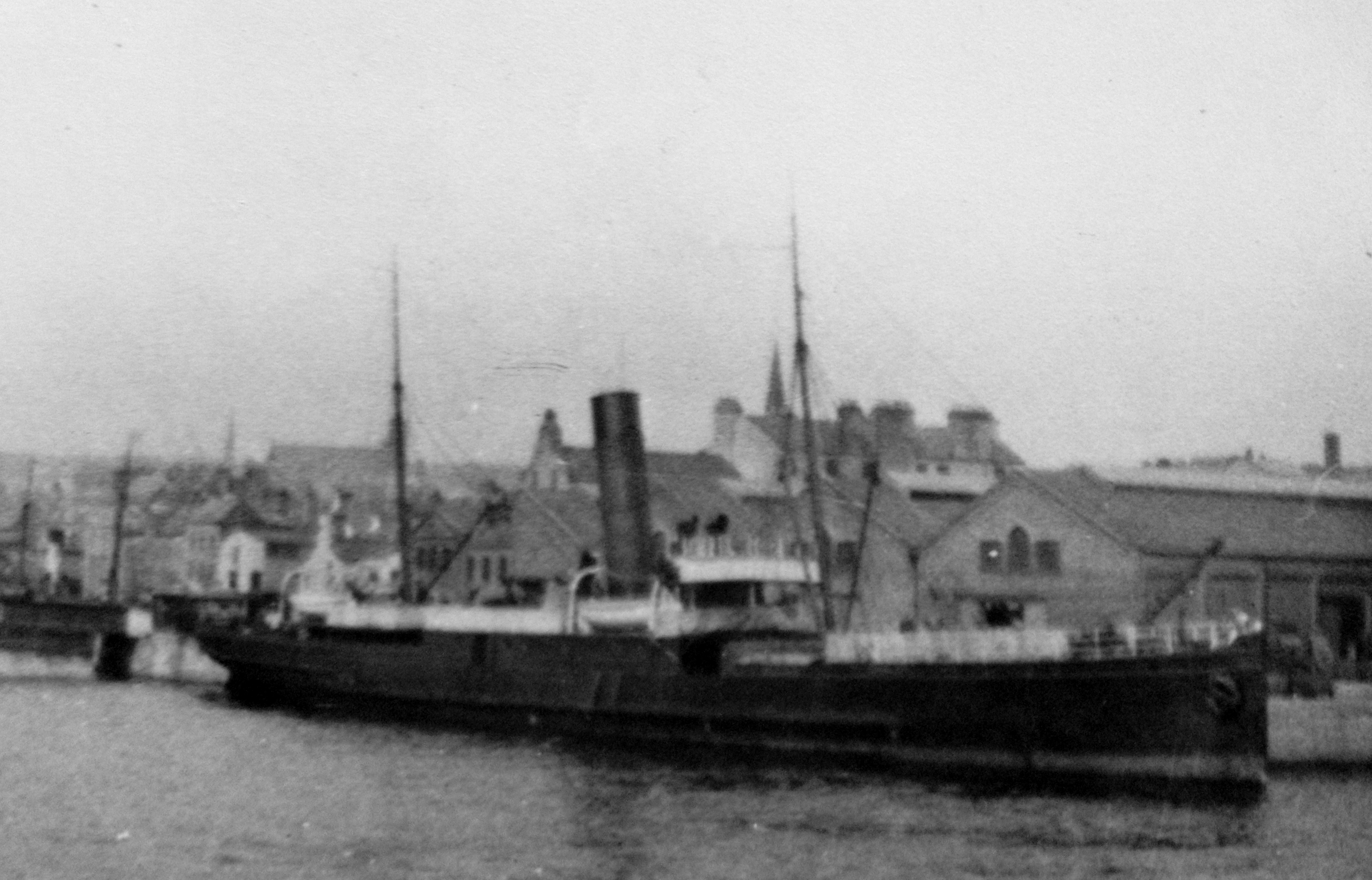
Douglas, pictured berthed at the Office Berth, Douglas, Isle of Man.

== Official number and code letters ==
Official numbers are issued by individual flag states. They should not be confused with IMO ship identification numbers. Douglas had the UK Official Number 94515 and originally used the Code Letters L C G W.

== Bibliography ==
Media related to Douglas (ship, 1889) at Wikimedia Commons

- Chappell, Connery (1980). Island Lifeline T. Stephenson & Sons Ltd ISBN 0-901314-20-X
