= HMS Lysander (1913) =

Early 20th-century Royal Navy destroyer

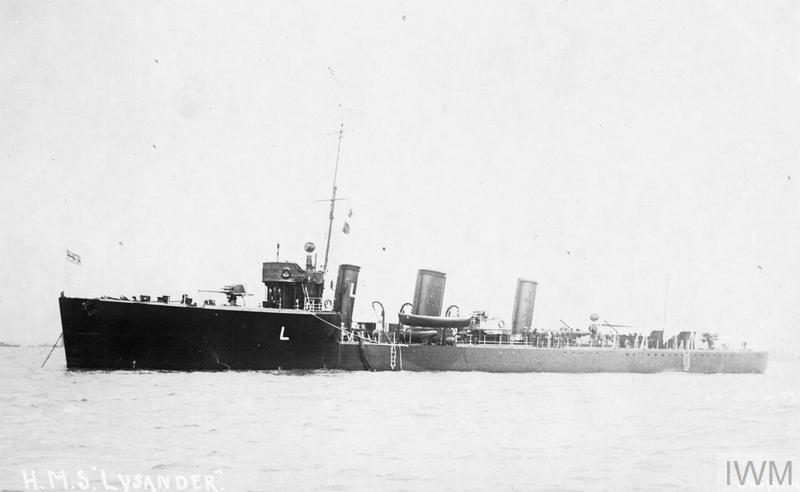
- Lysander

History

United Kingdom
- Name: HMS Lysander
- Namesake: Lysander
- Builder: Swan Hunter, Wallsend
- Laid down: 8 August 1912
- Launched: 18 August 1913
- Completed: 9 December 1913
- Out of service: 9 June 1922
- Fate: Broken up by Cashmore of Newport

General characteristics (as built)
- Class & type: Laforey-class destroyer
- Displacement: 976 long tons (992 t) (normal); 1,150 long tons (1,170 t) (deep load)
- Length: 268 ft 8 in (82 m) o/a
- Beam: 27 ft 8 in (8 m)
- Draught: 10 ft 6 in (3 m)
- Propulsion: 4 Yarrow boilers; 2 Parsons steam turbines; 24,500 shp (18,300 kW)
- Speed: 29 knots (33.4 mph; 53.7 km/h)
- Range: 1,720 nmi (3,190 km) at 15 kn (28 km/h)
- Complement: 73
- Armament: 3 × single QF 4-inch (102 mm) Mark IV guns; 1 × single 7.7 mm (0.3 in) Maxim gun; 2 × twin 21 in (533 mm) torpedo tubes

HMS Lysander was a Laforey-class destroyer that served with the Royal Navy during the First World War. Launched in August 1913 as HMS Ulysses, the ship was renamed the following month under an Admiralty order to become one of the first in what would be the norm, a class of destroyers named after successive letters of the alphabet. On commissioning, the vessel joined the Third Destroyer Flotilla and operated as part of the Harwich Force. The destroyer took part in the Battle of Heligoland Bight in 1914, attacking the German light cruiser Mainz and escorted the seaplane carriers Engadine and Riviera in an abortive attempt to attack the Cuxhaven airship base. During 1915, Lysander undertook anti-submarine patrols and escorting duties, coming under fire from German shore-based batteries while accompanying the mine-laying paddle-steamers Prince of Wales and Queen Victoria off the coast of Ostend. In 1916, the destroyer was involved in action with German battlecruisers following the bombardment of Yarmouth and Lowestoft but escaped unharmed, and rescued the survivors from the Canadian hospital ship Llandovery Castle in 1918. With the cessation of hostilities, the ship was placed in reserve and sold to be broken up in June 1922.

== Design and development ==
Lysander was one of twenty-two L- or Laforey-class destroyers built for the Royal Navy, and one of two ordered from Swan Hunter on 29 March 1912. The design followed the preceding Acasta-class but with improved seakeeping properties and armament, including twice the number of torpedo tubes.

The destroyer had a length overall of 268 feet 8 inches (82 m), a beam of 27 feet 8 inches (8 m) and a draught of 10 feet 6 inches (3 m). Displacement was 976 long tons (992 t) normal and 1,150 long tons (1,170 t) deep load. Power was provided by four Yarrow boilers feeding two Parsons steam turbines which had a combined rating of 24,500 shaft horsepower (18,300 kW) and drove two shafts. Design speed was 29 knots (54 km/h; 33 mph), although the vessel achieved 29.9 knots (55.4 km/h; 34.4 mph) on trial. Three funnels were fitted. 268 long tons (272 t) of oil were carried, giving a design range of 1,720 nautical miles (3,190 km; 1,980 mi) at 15 knots (28 km/h; 17 mph). The ship's complement was 73 officers and ratings.

Armament consisted of three single QF 4-inch (100 mm) Mk IV guns on the ship's centreline, with one on the forecastle, one aft and one between the funnels. The guns could fire a shell weighing 31 pounds (14 kg) at a muzzle velocity of 2,177 feet per second (664 m/s). One single 7.7 mm (0.3 in) Maxim gun was carried. A single 2-pounder 40 mm (2 in) "pom-pom" anti-aircraft gun was later added. Torpedo armament consisted of two twin mounts for 21 in (533 mm) torpedoes mounted aft. Capacity to lay four Vickers Elia Mk.4 mines was included, but the facility was never used.

== Construction and career ==
Built under the 1912–1913 Programme and originally named Ulysses, the ship was laid down by Swan Hunter at Wallsend on the River Tyne on 8 August 1912. The ship was launched on 18 August 1913 and completed on 9 December 1913, but in the interim had been renamed Lysander by Admiralty order on 30 September 1913. This was the first time that the Navy had used the name Lysander in the century, recalling the Spartan military leader. Originally part of a class named after characters in Shakespeare's plays and the Waverley novels by Sir Walter Scott, the destroyer joined what was to be the first in a new way of naming classes of warships, with each class of destroyers named after a successive letter of the alphabet.

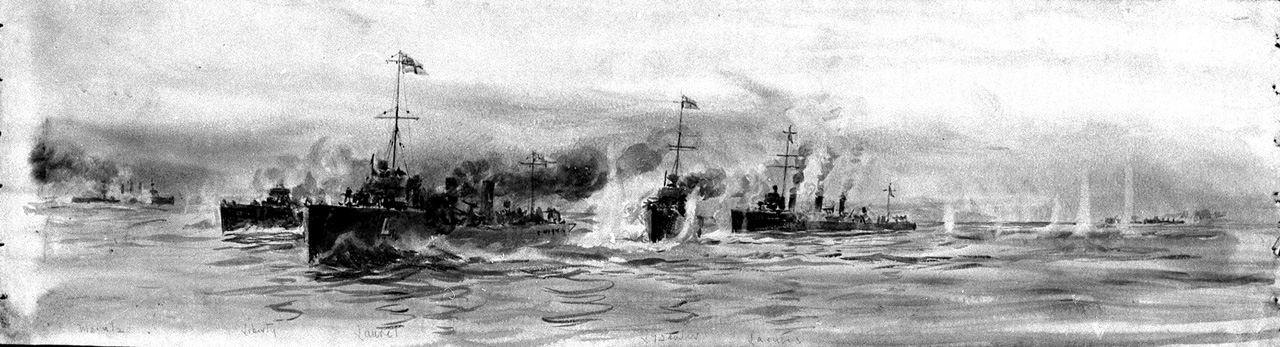
Lysander and the other destroyers of the Fourth Division under fire from Maintz during the Battle of Heligoland Bight

On commissioning, the newly renamed Lysander joined the Third Destroyer Flotilla as part of the Harwich Force. After the British entry into the First World War on 4 August 1914, the flotilla was tasked with harassing the Imperial German Navy and on 26 August was ordered to attack German torpedo boats on their patrol as part of a large Royal Navy fleet in what was to be the Battle of Heligoland Bight. The following day, Lysander was part of the Fourth Division, which included fellow L-class destroyers Laertes, Laurel and Liberty, when the German torpedo boat G194 was sighted. The destroyers set off at speed in pursuit, engaging with G194 and G196, and soon encountering the German 5th Flotilla. Lysander was third in the line when their pursuit brought them to the light cruiser Mainz, which swiftly brought in a barrage of fire against the British vessels. The cruiser hit all three of the other destroyers, but Lysander avoided both substantial damage by shells and colliding with Liberty by responding quickly to the helm. Despite being outgunned, the destroyer returned fire, expending 93 rounds of ammunition. The arrival of the light cruisers of the First Light Cruiser Squadron turned the tide and the British forces overwhelmed the German ship.

On 24 and 25 October 1914, the Harwich Force, including Lysander, covered the seaplane carriers Engadine and Riviera, as the carriers' aircraft attempted to attack a German airship base at Cuxhaven. However, the attack was aborted due to the poor weather, with few of the seaplanes getting airborne and those which did failing to reach the objective. On 2–3 November 1914, Lysander was part of a patrol of four destroyers led by the light cruiser Undaunted from Harwich to off Terschelling which narrowly missed encountering a German force of battlecruisers and cruisers on the way to bombard and lay mines off the town of Great Yarmouth.

On 23 January 1915, the destroyer formed part of the First Division of the Third Flotilla during the Battle of Dogger Bank. The flotilla was incapable of keeping sufficient speed to engage in the battle, which was left to newer and faster M-class destroyers. On 30 January 1915, Lysander, together with sister ships Laforey, Landrail and Liberty, were detached from the Harwich Force to hunt submarines (in particular U-21) in the Irish Channel. On 5 February, Lysander and Liberty escorted the liners Transylvania and Ausonia from Queenstown, Ireland, to Liverpool, with Lysander receiving damage from high seas which required repair at Chatham. On 8 April 1915, Lysander and Laertes escorted the paddle-steamers Prince Edward and Queen Victoria as they laid anti-submarine nets off Ostend, with the destroyers coming under fire from German 15 centimetres (5.91 in) shore batteries, although they were unharmed. While the net-layers then returned to base, the two destroyers patrolled the nets, and were unsuccessfully bombed by German aircraft the next day before returning to port. In June 1915, most of the Harwich Force, including Lysander was employed in anti-submarine operations at the west end of the English Channel, covering the arrival of troops from Canada and the despatch of troops to the Dardanelles campaign.

From 28 July to 31 July 1915, cruisers and destroyers from the Grand Fleet and Harwich Force carried out Operation C, a large scale sweep into the Skagerrak with the intent of disrupting sea trade between Sweden and Germany. Lysander detained one Danish merchant ship, the Cito which was thought to be acting suspiciously, and escorted the steamer to the Humber for further examination. Lysander formed part of the covering force for minelaying operations on 16–18 August and 11 September. The Third Flotilla, including Lysander, was renumbered the Ninth Destroyer Flotilla on 4 September that year, although it remained as part of the Harwich Force.

On 24 April 1916, a force of German battlecruisers and cruisers set out from Kiel to bombard the coastal towns of Lowestoft and Yarmouth. Later that day, the German battlecruiser Seydlitz struck a mine, and the resultant radio traffic warned the British of the German operation. The Harwich Force, including Lysander left port at midnight on the night of 24/25 April. The German battlecruisers aborted their bombardment of Yarmouth to engage the Harwich force, hitting the cruiser Conquest and the destroyer Laertes but retired to the East rather than attempt to destroy the smaller British force. Lysander was undamaged.

By April 1917, the destroyer had moved to the Seventh Destroyer Flotilla operating on the East coat of Britain. The vessel was then transferred to Devonport with the Fourth Destroyer Flotilla by August 1917, with the Flotilla being employed in convoy escort duties. On 29 June 1918, Lysander found the 24 remaining survivors from the Canadian hospital ship Llandovery Castle which had been sunk by U-27 the previous day; they became critical to a case at the Leipzig War Crimes Trials. After the Armistice of 11 November 1918 that ended the war, the Royal Navy returned to a peacetime level of strength and both the number of ships and personnel in service needed to be reduced to save money. Lysander was initially placed in reserve at Plymouth alongside over 49 other destroyers. On 9 June 1922, the vessel was sold to Cashmore of Newport, Wales, and was subsequently broken up.

== Pennant numbers ==
Pennant number	Date
H93	December 1914
H68	January 1918
H81	January 1919
