= SS King Orry (1871) =

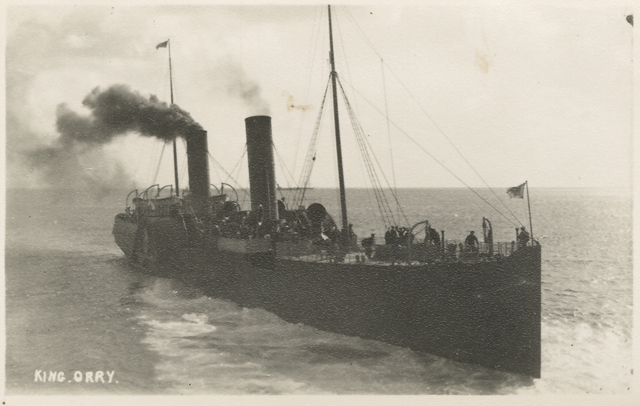
- RMS King Orry

History

Isle of Man
- Name: King Orry
- Owner: 1871–1912: IOMSPCo.
- Operator: 1871–1912: IOMSPCo.
- Port of registry: Douglas, Isle of Man
- Builder: R. Duncan & Co. Port Glasgow
- Cost: £26,000
- Launched: 27 March 1871
- In service: 1871
- Out of service: 1912
- Identification: Official Number 45479; Code Letters P K J B
- Fate: Scrapped at Llanerchymor, 1912

General characteristics
- Tonnage: 809 gross register tons (GRT) later increased to 1,104 gross register tons (GRT)
- Length: 260 ft 0 in (79.2 m) later increased to 290 ft 0 in (88.4 m)
- Beam: 29 ft 4 in (8.9 m)
- Depth: 14 ft 7 in (4.4 m)
- Installed power: 1,700 shp (1,300 kW)
- Propulsion: Diagonal compound engines, working at 110 pounds per square inch (760 kPa), developing 1,700 shp (1,300 kW)
- Speed: 15 knots (28 km/h; 17 mph)
- Capacity: 1104 passengers
- Crew: 47

SS (RMS) King Orry (II) No. 45479 – the second vessel in the company's history to bear the name – was an iron paddle-steamer operated by the Isle of Man Steam Packet Company.

King Orry berthed at the Office Berth, Douglas.

== Construction and dimensions ==
King Orry was built by R. Duncan & Co., at Port Glasgow in 1871, with engines by Rankin & Blackmore, and launched on Monday 27 March 1871. Length 260'; beam 29'4"; depth 14'7", King Orry had an original tonnage of 809 GRT, and this was later increased to 1,104. Her original speed was 15 knots.

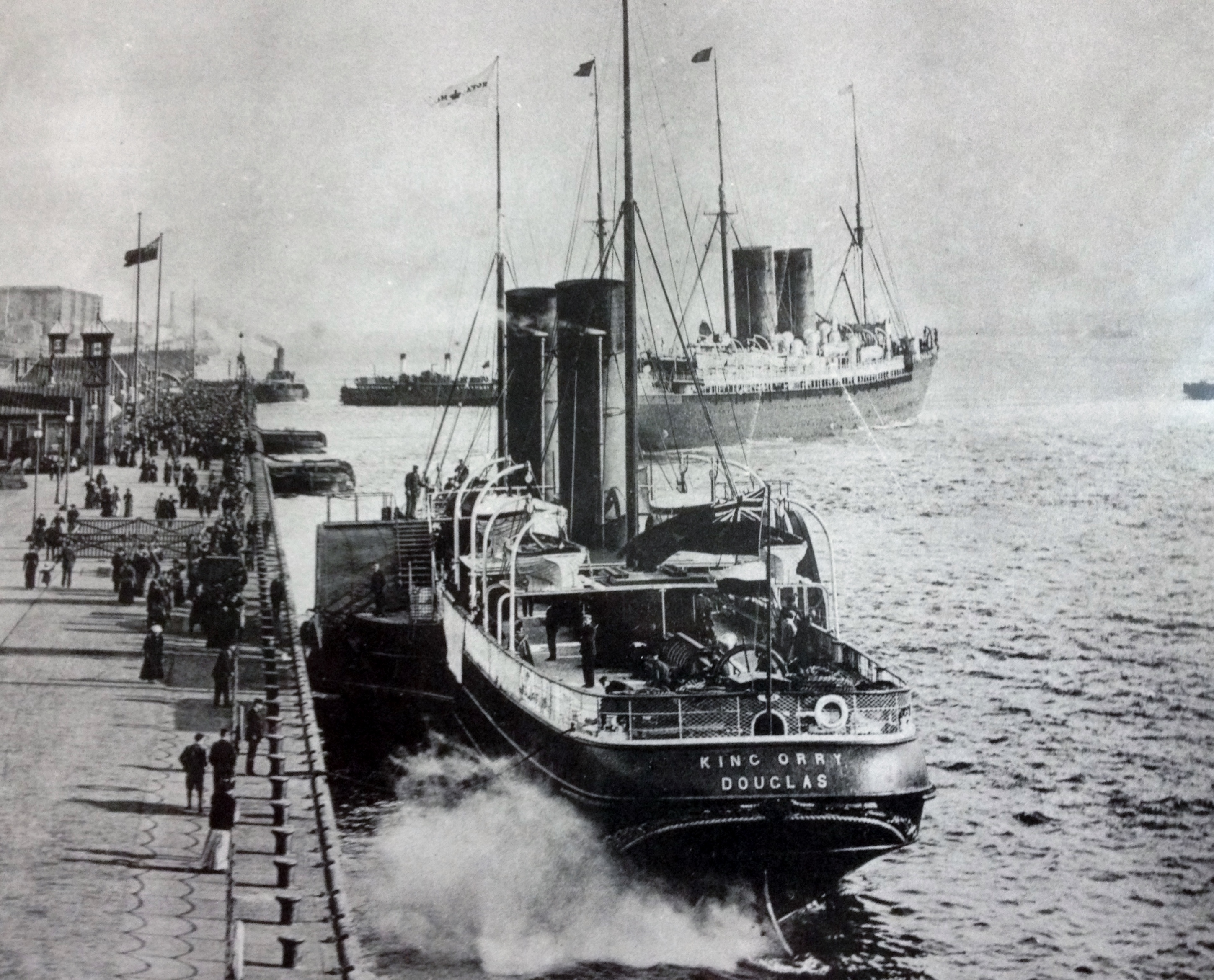
King Orry at the Pier Head, Liverpool.

In 1888, King Orry was refitted by Fairfield & Co at a cost of £8,246. She was lengthened by 30 feet, and at the same time she was reboilered by J. Jones & Co for £4,080.

This thorough refit gave her a new boiler pressure of 110 pounds per square inch (760 kPa), her diagonal compound engine now had a stroke of 78 inches with a high-pressure cylinder of 52 inches and low pressure 92. Consequently, her speed was now increased from 15 knots (28 km/h; 17 mph) to 17 knots (31 km/h; 20 mph).

In 1895 she was given a complete electric lighting installation costing £575.

== Service life ==
Considered an exceptionally well appointed ship, King Orry saw service on the wide range of routes the Steam Packet Company then operated.

A contemporary report of the time stated she had:-

A deck saloon 70ft long, 8ft high and 18ft broad. The paneled ceiling is white with gilded mouldings. At the sides, mirrors and windows alternate in a framework of birds-eye maple, divided by dark rosewood pilasters with richly-gilded capitals, a matching cornice running above. At the end of the saloon is a magnificent mirror, with a timepiece in the center. The seats at the sides and down the center are furnished with crimson velvet cushions, the windows are fitted with silk curtains to match, and green-patterned Brussels carpet covers the floor. The dining saloon is not quite as long as the upper saloon, but is broader, extending the width of the vessel. It is decorated and fitted up in much the same manner as the apartment above, but panels of maplewood are substituted for windows and mirrors and the mouldings and pilasters are of walnut. A handsome effect is produced by a band of fretwork in maple, backed with red silk, running around the length of the cabin above the crimson-velvetted and padded-back chairs.

— Henry, Fred, Ships of the Isle of Man Steam Packet Company (1973), p.13

For her operation the latest advancements in technology had been introduced. Part of this was the provision for telegraph communication with the engine room from both ends of the bridge, a speaking tube in the center and a third telegraph at the Captain's look-out house on the fore part of the hurricane deck.

The vessel could therefore either been steered from the hurricane deck or the aft part of the ship.

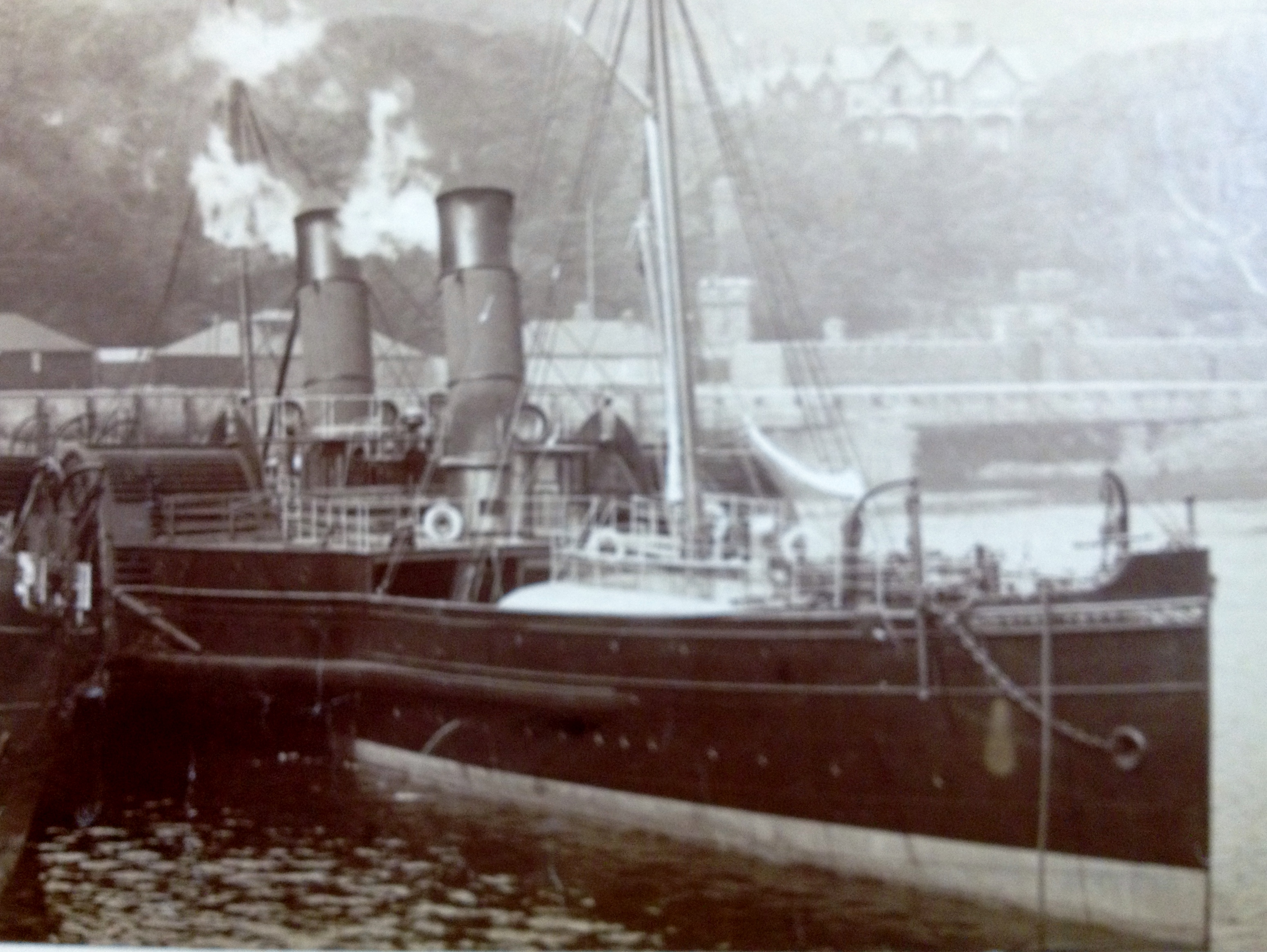
King Orry berthed at the Battery Pier, Douglas, Isle of Man.

At the time King Orry entered service approximately 100,000 passengers were being conveyed by the Company, thanks in no small measure to the newly constructed low water landing pier at Douglas (now named the Victoria Pier), prior to the construction of which required passengers to disembark by boat.

On 1 September 1873, during a voyage from Liverpool to Douglas, an explosion in her magazine injured several people, one seriously. On 12 August 1878, she collided with Concordia, which was at anchor in the River Mersey. King Orry was undamaged and proceeded on her voyage to Douglas. On 19 June 1884, the King Orry was required to go to the assistance of the Mona’s Isle which had suffered a mechanical failure. Departing Liverpool at 13:05hrs with approximately 250 passengers embarked, Mona’s Isle cleared the Victoria Channel and set a course bound for Douglas. She passed the Tynwald, which was engaged in accompanying yachts racing in the Mersey, at 14:30hrs which reported her to be making good speed. When approximately mid-channel the mechanical failure to her machinery occurred, forcing her Master, Capt. McQueen, to come to anchor and await the arrival of assistance. As there was no wireless communication at that time, anxiety was caused in Douglas as the scheduled time of arrival of the Mona’s Isle passed, requiring the Isle of Man Steam Packet Company to contact their Liverpool office to ensure that she had departed on time. This was duly confirmed and the King Orry, under the command of Capt. Gill, was coaled and despatched in order to locate the Mona’s Isle and give assistance. At 23:15hrs the Mona’s Isle was located by the King Orry, which then took her under tow and proceeded to Douglas. Passage was slow, and it was not until 05:00hrs the following morning that the two vessels arrived in Douglas; where many people had stayed on the Victoria Pier all night, anxious to receive news. Whilst out of commission, the King Orry replaced the Mona’s Isle on the Liverpool schedule, and in turn she was replaced on the Fleetwood schedule by the Fenella.

== Disposal ==
After 41 years of service – the longest service record up until that time in the history of the Steam Packet Fleet – the decision was made to withdraw her. She was taken by Captain Quine to Llanerchymor for breaking, but before scrapping commenced she was opened for public inspection with the proceeds of this been donated to the Honeywell Cottage Hospital.

King Orry was broken up at Llanerchymor, Wales, in 1912.

== Official number and code letters ==
Official numbers are issued by individual flag states. They should not be confused with IMO ship identification numbers. King Orry had the UK Official Number 45479 and used the Code Letters P K J B.
