= John Allen Mylrea =

Manx politician (1849–1911)

- John Mylrea, MHK.

Member of the House of Keys
- In office 1881–1900
- Monarch: Queen Victoria
- Governor: Henry Loch, Sir Spencer Walpole, Sir Joseph Ridgeway, Lord Henniker

Personal details
- Born: 23 January 1849 Douglas, Isle of Man
- Died: 13 July 1911 (aged 62) Schandau, Germany
- Party: Independent
- Spouse: Margaret Isabella Killey(died 1926)
- Children: May Mylrea (died 1943)
- Parent(s): John Mylrea, Jane Allen
- Profession: Advocate / Businessman
- Known for: Noted bon viveur

John Allen Mylrea MHK (January 23, 1849 – July 13, 1911), was a member of the House of Keys, Chairman of the Isle of Man Steam Packet Company and a director of Dumbell's Bank, who in the late 19th century played a prominent part in the arts and culture of the Isle of Man.

== Biography ==
=== Personal life ===
The only child of John Mylrea (1817–1881), a prosperous book and sheet music retailer, and Jane Allen (1817–1882), John Allen Mylrea was born in Douglas, Isle of Man and raised in the family home at 21 Duke Street. He was educated by Dr McBurney at the Athol Academy, where it is said he had a promising scholastic career. He then became a student for the Manx Bar and was admitted in 1871, followed a few years later by his admittance to the English Bar. However he only briefly practised as an advocate; thanks to the largesse of his father a sizable private income allowed him to indulge in more congenial pursuits, such as art and music.

An unabashed bon viveur and widely regarded as one of the most cultured people in Manx society, Mylrea was said to have been a splendid linguist, a gourmet and connoisseur of fine wine, an authority on painting and architecture and to have possessed a profound knowledge and deep love of classical literature and music. For many years he was honorary choirmaster of St Thomas' Church, Douglas, during which time it is said he directed some of the finest musical services ever experienced on the Isle of Man. In addition, Mylrea took a prominent part in both the Douglas Choral Society and the Douglas Orchestral Society.

Mylrea married Margaret Killey, the daughter of Phillip Killey, Captain of the Parish of Marown. The marriage produced a daughter, May, who married Carl Hellstrom at St Thomas' Church on January 17, 1912. At the time of her death in 1943, Hellstrop was attached to the Swedish Legation in London. The Mylrea family home was at High Cliffe, which Mylrea had built and which overlooked Douglas Bay.

During Mylrea's time as Chairman of the Isle of Man Steam Packet Company, his wife performed the christening of the Empress Queen on Thursday March 4, 1897.

=== Politics ===
In 1881 Mylrea was elected to the House of Keys for Garff, and represented that sheading until the passing of the Redistribution Act 1893 when he transferred to Douglas North. Although not a debater in the true sense of the word, Mylrea is said to have been the most graceful speaker in the House. Often using Latin phrases and quoting such writers as Shakespeare and Dickens, his oratorical efforts were marked by an ease, polish, and finish which none of his contemporaries in Tynwald could approach.

In 1891, Mylrea successfully moved an amendment that gave unmarried women leaseholders the right to vote in elections to the House of Keys.

Said to be liberal in his Conservative views, he was defeated by one vote in an election for Speaker of the House of Keys in 1898 by Arthur William Moore. Following the collapse of Dumbell's Bank, Mylrea resigned his Douglas North seat in May 1900.

=== Business ===
Through his association with Alexander Bruce, Mylrea became a director of Isle of Man Tramways Company. He also became a director and subsequently Chairman of the Isle of Man Steam Packet Company and held a keen interest in the development of the Electric Tramways from Douglas to Laxey and Ramsey and from Laxey to the summit of Snaefell.

Mylrea became a director of Dumbell's Bank in 1887 and although still a director and shareholder of the company he was not implicated in the Dumbell's Bank Scandal of 1900, although his reputation was tainted by association. Following the bank's collapse Mylrea was appointed as one of the liquidators; however he subsequently resigned following a degree of disquiet regarding his role, which in turn had a profound effect on his general health.

=== Death ===
Mylrea's health declined dramatically as a consequence of the Dumbell's Bank collapse. He left the Isle of Man very soon afterwards and lived at various places in Europe, mainly Italy and Switzerland, until he made his home in Germany. John Allen Mylrea died in Bad Schandau, Germany on Thursday July 13, 1911; he was survived by his wife and daughter.

Mylrea died intestate, the sum of his personal estate on the Isle of Man amounted at valuation to £1,000 (about £114,000 as of 2019). Mylrea's widow, Margaret, died at Clifton, Bristol, on November 11, 1926; his daughter died in Luton, Bedfordshire in September 1943.
