= SS Prince of Wales =

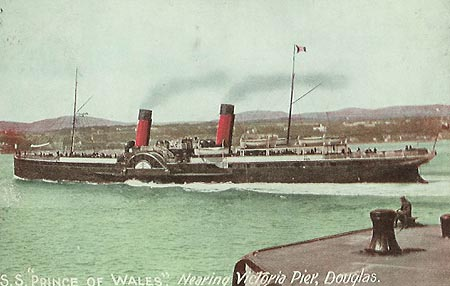
- Prince of Wales

History
- Name: Prince of Wales; 1915: Prince Edward
- Owner: 1887–1888: Isle of Man, Liverpool and Manchester Steamship Company; 1888-1915: Isle of Man Steam Packet Company; 1915-1919: Admiralty
- Operator: 1887–1888: Isle of Man, Liverpool and Manchester Steamship Company; 1888-1915: IoMSPCo.; 1915-1919: Admiralty
- Port of registry: Douglas, Isle of Man
- Builder: Fairfield Shipbuilding and Engineering Company, Govan
- Cost: Purchased by the Isle of Man Steam Packet Company together with her sister Queen Victoria for £155,000
- Way number: 93381
- Launched: 14 April 1887
- Completed: 1887
- Acquired: 1888
- In service: 1888
- Out of service: 1915
- Identification: Official Number 93381; Code Letters P K D B
- Fate: Sold to the Admiralty together with her sister, Queen Victoria, 1915. Scrapped at Scheveningen, the Netherlands, 1919

General characteristics
- Type: Paddle Steamer
- Tonnage: 1,568 gross register tons (GRT)
- Length: 330 feet (100 m)
- Beam: 39 ft 1 in (11.9 m)
- Depth: 15 ft 2 in (4.6 m)
- Installed power: 6,500 shp (4,800 kW)
- Propulsion: Two compound steam engines, working at 110 pounds per square inch (760 kPa) developing 6,500 shp (4,800 kW)
- Speed: 24.25 knots (27.91 mph)
- Capacity: 1546 passengers
- Crew: 69

PS (RMS) Prince of Wales No. 93381 was a steel built paddle steamer which was purchased together with her sister PS Queen Victoria, by the Isle of Man Steam Packet Company from the Isle of Man, Liverpool and Manchester Steamship Company in 1888 - referred to as The Manx Line.

== Construction and dimensions ==
Prince of Wales was built by Fairfield Shipbuilding and Engineering Company, Govan, in 1887, and was launched on Thursday, 14 April 1887. Fairfield's also supplied her engines and boilers. The cost of her construction is not recorded. However, she was purchased by the Steam Packet Company together with PS Queen Victoria for the sum of £155,000 (equivalent to £21,800,000 in 2023)

Length 330'; beam 39'1"; depth 15'2". Prince of Wales had a registered tonnage of 2,568 GRT, was certified to carry 1546 passengers and had a crew complement of 69. Both sisters were fitted with compound engines developing 6,500 shp (4,800 kW) at 40.5 r.p.m., with a boiler steam pressure of 110 pounds per square inch (760 kPa).

Both the Prince of Wales and Queen Victoria's engines were referred to as a coupled two crankshaft engine. The crankshaft was connected at the crank by a drag link, the object of which was to get the two cranks at right angles, one driving the valve gear of the other. The high-pressure cylinder was horizontal to, and the low-pressure cylinder diagonal to, the centre of the shaft. The two cylinders were 61 and 112 inches in diameter with a 78-inch stroke.

So successful were these two ships that a number of other companies adopted the engine design for cross-channel work.

== Service life ==
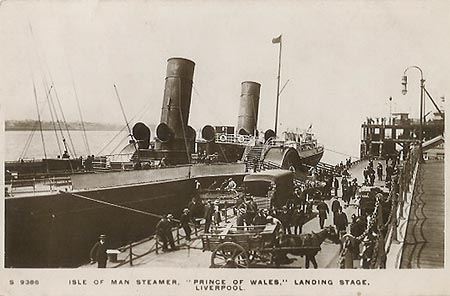
Prince of Wales disembarks passengers at The Pier Head, Liverpool.

The Manx Line, as the Isle of Man, Liverpool and Manchester Steamship Company was called commenced service with the Prince of Wales and her sister Queen Victoria. Both ships had been built by Fairfield's to excel the Mona's Isle and the Mona's Queen it being the intention of the shipbuilding firm that the Steam Packet Company should be forced to buy these two ships.

To counter these rivals, the Steam Packet Company reduced fares, and The Manx Line retaliated. They advertised a 3hr 30mins passage from Douglas to Liverpool, and their two ships were certainly capable of keeping such a schedule, being able to complete passage between the ports 30mins quicker than the Steam Packet ships.

As in the early days of the Isle of Man Steam Packet Company, racing between the two Companies' ships took place. On 19 May 1888, Mona's Isle and Queen Victoria had an exciting race, with the Queen Victoria winning by 32 minutes.

As a consequence of reckless price-cutting both companies lost money, and at the end of 1888, the Steam Packet Company bought the two Manx Line ships, both of which became reliable and valued members of the fleet.

The Prince of Wales was considered a very fast ship in her time. During her sea trials she was recorded over a measured mile at a speed of 24.5 knots. She had beaten the best vessels in the Steam Packet fleet in the short rivalry between her original owners and the Steam Packet on the Douglas route, and was a most valuable addition to the fleet upon her acquisition. Prince of Wales once steamed from Rock Light, New Brighton to Douglas Head (a distance of 68 nautical miles), in 2hrs. 59 min., an average speed of 23.25 knots.

In August 1894, she collided with and sank the steamer Hibernia. Two of the crew of the Hibernia were lost, and a third man was picked up by the Steam Packet ship. Some months later the Manx vessel was held to blame, and a claim of £1,750 was awarded against the company.

== War service ==
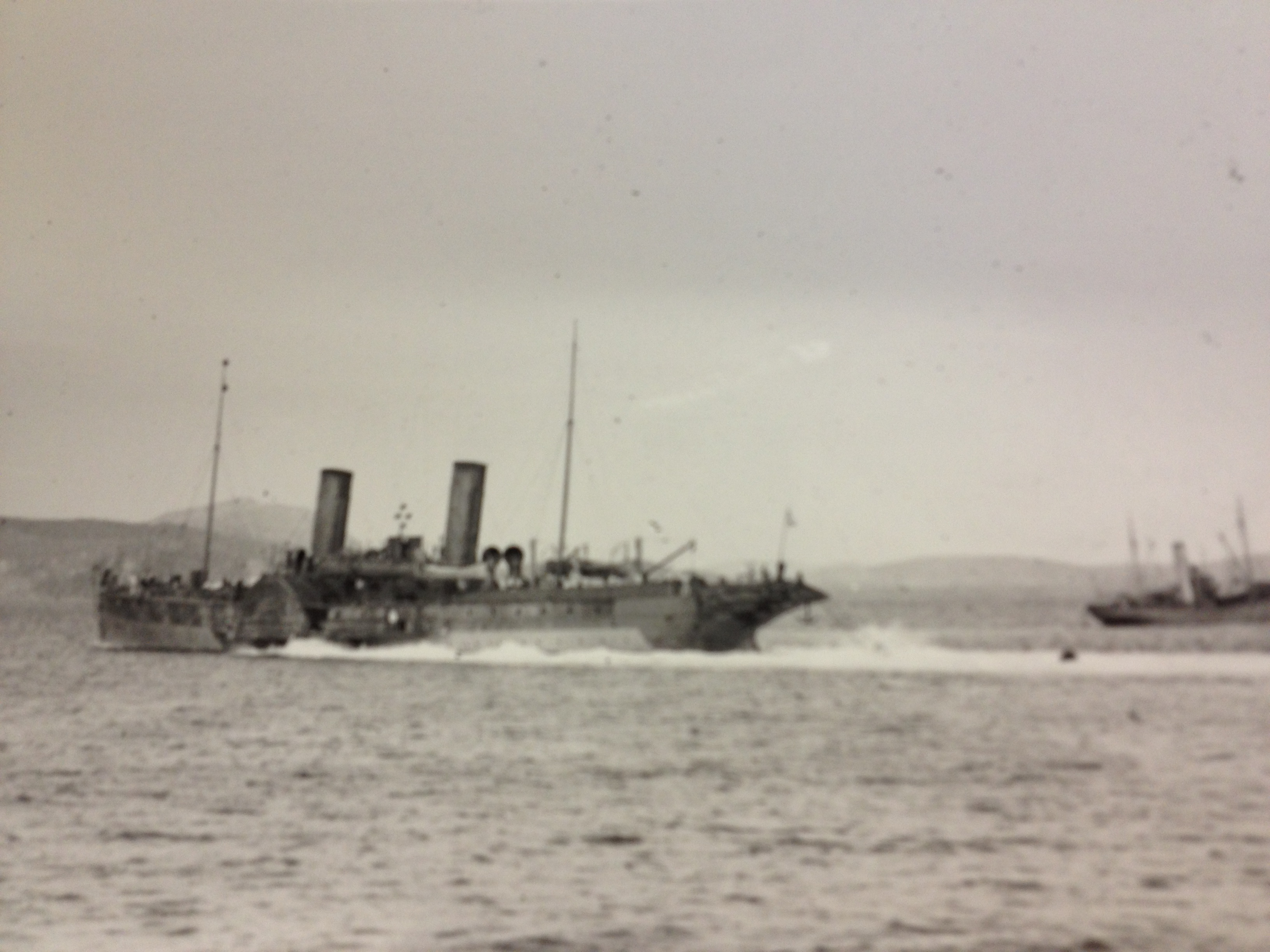
Prince Edward on wartime service

Prince of Wales was sold to the Admiralty in 1915. Her name was changed to Prince Edward and she was fitted out as a net-laying anti-submarine ship. Together with her sister, both vessels were still considered fast for their day, and although they were getting on in years, naval architects appeared to think that paddlers, if not converted to troop carriers, were well suited to an anti-submarine role.

The two ships were soon in the Eastern Mediterranean theatre, in support of troopships and even warships in the submarine-infested seas.

At one time during the Gallipoli Campaign they found themselves accompanying their Steam Packet sister Snaefell, which was landing troops at Suvla Bay.

== Disposal ==
After the Great War, she was sold under the name Prince Edward to T. C. Pas for £5,600; (equivalent to £284,000 in 2023) and was broken up at Scheveningen, the Netherlands.
