= HMS Argonaut (1898) =

Cruiser of the Royal Navy

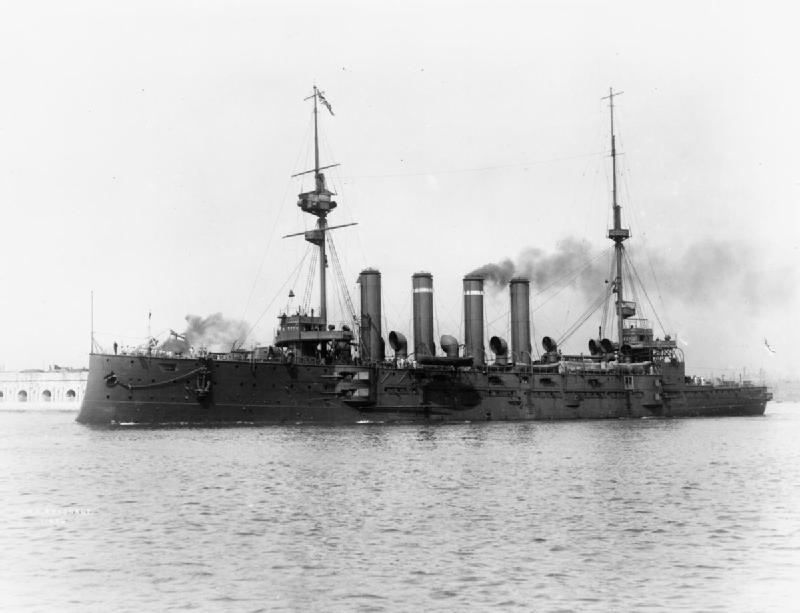
- HMS Argonaut

History

United Kingdom
- Name: HMS Argonaut
- Builder: Fairfield Shipbuilding and Engineering Company, Govan
- Laid down: 23 November 1896
- Launched: 24 January 1898
- Christened: Hersey Hope, Countess of Hopetoun
- Reclassified: Hospital ship at Portsmouth 1915; Accommodation ship 1918
- Fate: Sold for breaking up 18 May 1920

General characteristics
- Class & type: Diadem-class cruiser
- Displacement: 11,000 tons
- Length: 435 ft (133 m) (462 ft 6 in (140.97 m) o/a)
- Beam: 69 ft (21 m)
- Draught: 25 ft 6 in (7.77 m)
- Propulsion: 2 shaft triple expansion engines; 16.500 - 18,000 hp
- Speed: 20–20.5 kn (37.0–38.0 km/h; 23.0–23.6 mph)
- Complement: 760
- Armament: 16 × single QF 6-inch (152 mm) guns; 14 × single QF 12-pounder (76 mm) guns; 3 × single QF 3-pounder (47 mm) guns; 2 × 18-inch (450 mm) torpedo tubes; as Minelayer: 4 × 6-inch guns; 1 × 12-pounder gun; 354 mines
- Armour: 6 inch casemates; 4.5-2 inch decks

HMS Argonaut was a ship of the Diadem-class of protected cruiser in the British Royal Navy. She was laid down in 1898, and commissioned for service on the China station in 1900. From 1906 she served in the Home Fleet, and during the First World War she served in the Atlantic. She was converted to hospital ship in 1915, and sold for breaking up in 1920.

== Construction ==
Argonaut was built by Fairfield Shipbuilding and Engineering Company, Govan, where she was laid down on 23 November 1896. She was launched on 24 January 1898, when she was christened by the Countess of Hopetoun.

Whilst on the stocks under construction, fire broke out in the yard on February 8, 1897. The blaze spread quickly, engulfing the workshops and threatening not only the Argonaut but numerous vessels including the RMS Empress Queen. However due to the vessels being separated from the buildings no damage was sustained.

== Service history ==
She was commissioned at Chatham in April 1900 for service on the China Station, where she was until 1904. During this time, the Commanding Officer, Captain George H Cherry RN, issued some 600 punishment warrants, gaining a reputation as a stern disciplinarian. As a consequence, the ship's officers ordered medals to be struck by Gamages of London as reward and mementos of their service under such a captain: on the obverse it read "Argonaut China 1900-1904" and showed a fouled anchor (for the Royal Navy), a fleece (for Argonaut) and a dragon (for China); on the reverse are a cherry tree and a representation of the officers who survived the commission. An honorary "Cherry Medal" was presented to King George VI; many others were lost with ships sunk in the First World War.

From June to September 1906, Argonaut was refitted for special service and in October, joined the Home Fleet. She was paid off in February 1911 and recommissioned February 1912, joining the 3rd Fleet. The cruiser was paid off again in April 1914.

During the First World War Argonaut was part of the 9th Cruiser Squadron, operating in the Atlantic. The squadron was stationed off Cape Finisterre from August 1914 to July 1915. While a part of this unit, Argonaut captured the German merchant ship Graecia. In 1915 she was converted to a hospital ship at Portsmouth and in 1918, to an accommodation ship. She was sold to Ward of Milford Haven on 18 May 1920 and arrived there for breaking up on 4 September 1921.
