= SS Queen Victoria =

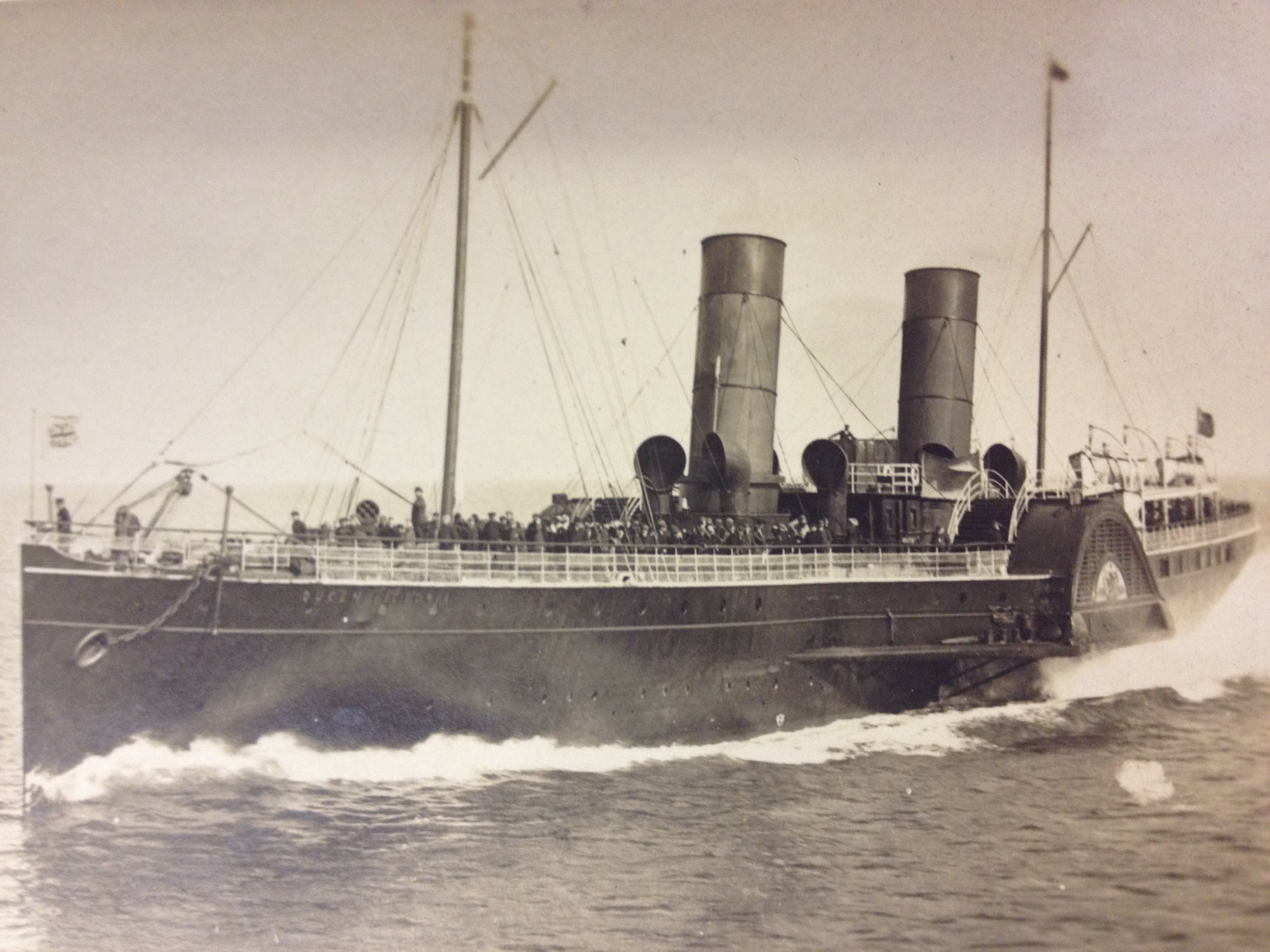
- Queen Victoria

History
- Name: Queen Victoria
- Owner: 1887–1888: Isle of Man, Liverpool and Manchester Steamship Company. 1888-1915: Isle of Man Steam Packet Company. 1915-1920: Admiralty.
- Operator: 1887–1888: Isle of Man, Liverpool and Manchester Steamship Company. 1888-1915: Isle of Man Steam Packet Company. 1915-1920: Admiralty.
- Port of registry: Douglas, Isle of Man
- Builder: Fairfield Shipbuilding and Engineering Company, Govan.
- Cost: Purchased by the Isle of Man Steam Packet Company together with her sister Prince of Wales for £155,000 in 1888.
- Way number: 93379
- Launched: 29 March 1887
- Completed: 1887
- In service: 1887
- Out of service: 1915
- Identification: Official Number 93379; Code Letters P K C S
- Fate: Sold to the Admiralty together with her sister, Prince of Wales, 1915. Scrapped in the Netherlands, 1920.

General characteristics
- Type: Paddle Steamer.
- Tonnage: 1,568 gross register tons (GRT)
- Length: 330 feet (100 m)
- Beam: 39 ft 1 in (11.9 m)
- Depth: 15 ft 2 in (4.6 m)
- Ice class: N/A
- Installed power: 6,500 shp (4,800 kW)
- Propulsion: Two compound steam engines, working at 110 pounds per square inch (760 kPa) developing 6,500 shp (4,800 kW)
- Speed: 21 knots (24 mph) as service speed. (recorded at 22.5 knots during her delivery run)
- Capacity: 1546 passengers.
- Crew: 69.

PS (RMS) Queen Victoria No. 93379 was a steel built paddle steamer which was purchased together with her sister PS Prince of Wales, by the Isle of Man Steam Packet Company from the Isle of Man, Liverpool and Manchester Steamship Company in 1888 - referred to as The Manx Line.

== Construction and dimensions ==
Queen Victoria was built by Fairfield Shipbuilding and Engineering Company, Govan in 1887, and was launched on Tuesday 29 March 1887. Fairfield's also supplied her engines and boilers. The cost of her construction is not recorded. However, she was purchased by the Steam Packet Company together with RMS Prince of Wales for the sum of £155,000 (equivalent to £17,418,495 in 2025)

Length 330'; beam 39'1"; depth 15'2". Queen Victoria had a registered tonnage of 1,568 GRT, was certified to carry 1546 passengers and had a crew complement of 69. Both sisters were fitted with compound engines developing 6,500 shp (4,800 kW) at 40.5 r.p.m., with a boiler steam pressure of 110 pounds per square inch (760 kPa).

Both the Queen Victoria's and Prince of Wales' engines were referred to as a coupled two crankshaft engine. The crankshaft was connected at the crank by a drag link, the object of which was to get the two cranks at right angles, one driving the valve gear of the other. The high-pressure cylinder was horizontal to, and the low-pressure cylinder diagonal to, the centre of the shaft. The two cylinders were 61 and 112 inches in diameter with a 78-inch stroke.

So successful were these two ships that a number of other companies adopted the engine design for cross-channel work.

== Service life ==
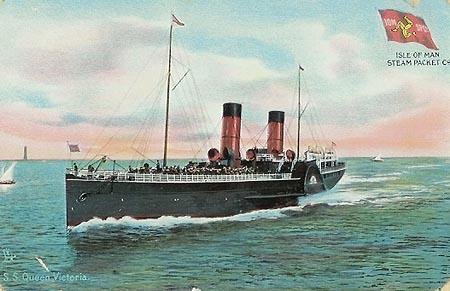
Postcard depiction of Queen Victoria.

The Manx Line, as the Isle of Man, Liverpool and Manchester Steamship Company was called commenced service with the Queen Victoria and her sister Prince of Wales. Both ships had been built by Fairfield's to excel the Mona's Isle and the Mona's Queen it being the intention of the shipbuilding firm that the Steam Packet Company should be forced to buy these two ships.

Fairfield's were interested in the Manx Line and the performance of the Queen Victoria was noted on her arrival at Liverpool to commence the Isle of Man service. On her delivery run from Glasgow on 21 May 1887, she had averaged 22.5 knots in heavy seas; said to be the then record between the Clyde and Mersey.

To counter these rivals, the Steam Packet Company reduced fares, and The Manx Line retaliated. They advertised a 3hr 30mins passage from Douglas to Liverpool, and their two ships were certainly capable of keeping such a schedule, being able to complete passage between the ports 30mins quicker than the Steam Packet ships.

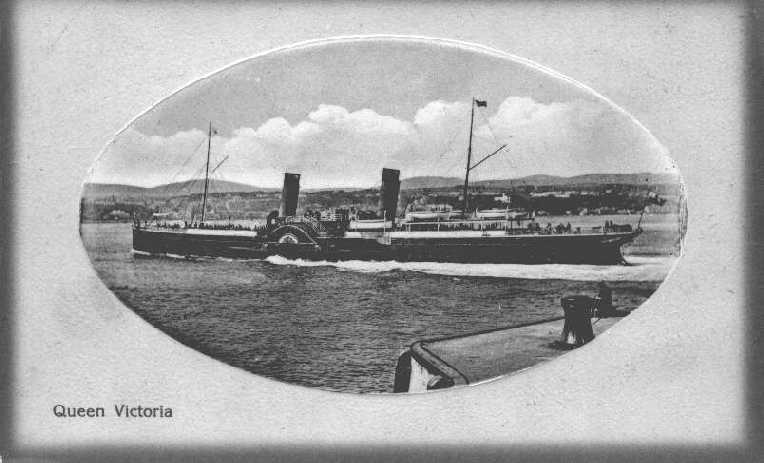
Queen Victoria approaches the Victoria Pier, Douglas.

As in the early days of the Isle of Man Steam Packet Company, racing between the two Companies' ships took place. On 19 May 1888, Mona's Isle and Queen Victoria had an exciting race, with the Queen Victoria winning by 32 minutes. Queen Victoria's sister Prince of Wales, on one occasion at least, made passage from the Rock Lighthouse, New Brighton to Douglas Head in 2hrs 59mins.

As a consequence of reckless price-cutting both companies lost money, and at the end of 1888, the Steam Packet Company bought the two Manx Line ships, both of which became reliable and valued members of the fleet. On 17 July 1889, Queen Victoria collided with the tug Victory in the River Mersey.

== War service ==
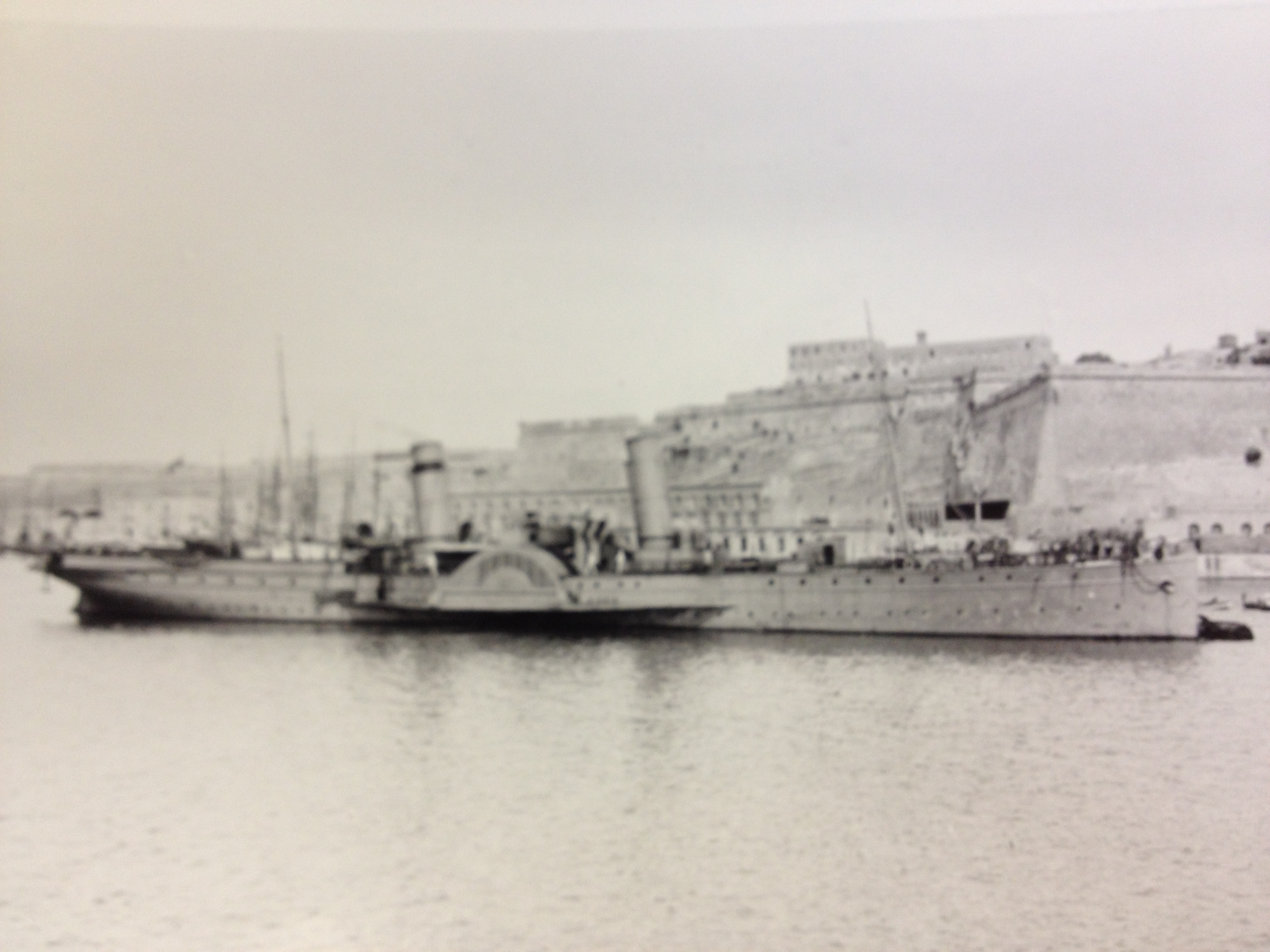
Queen Victoria, on wartime service, pictured at Malta, 1916.

Queen Victoria was sold to the Admiralty in 1915, and she was fitted out as a net-laying anti-submarine ship. Together with her sister, both vessels were still considered fast for their day, and although they were getting on in years, naval architects appeared to think that paddlers, if not converted to troop carriers, were well suited to an anti-submarine role.

The two ships were soon in the Eastern Mediterranean theatre, in support of troopships and even warships in the submarine-infested seas.

At one time during the Gallipoli Campaign they found themselves accompanying their Steam Packet sister Snaefell, which was landing troops at Suvla Bay.

== Disposal ==
After the Great War, she was sold in 1920 to Ambacht in the Netherlands for £5,450 (equivalent to £210,608 in 2025); and was broken up.
