= SS Snaefell (1910) =

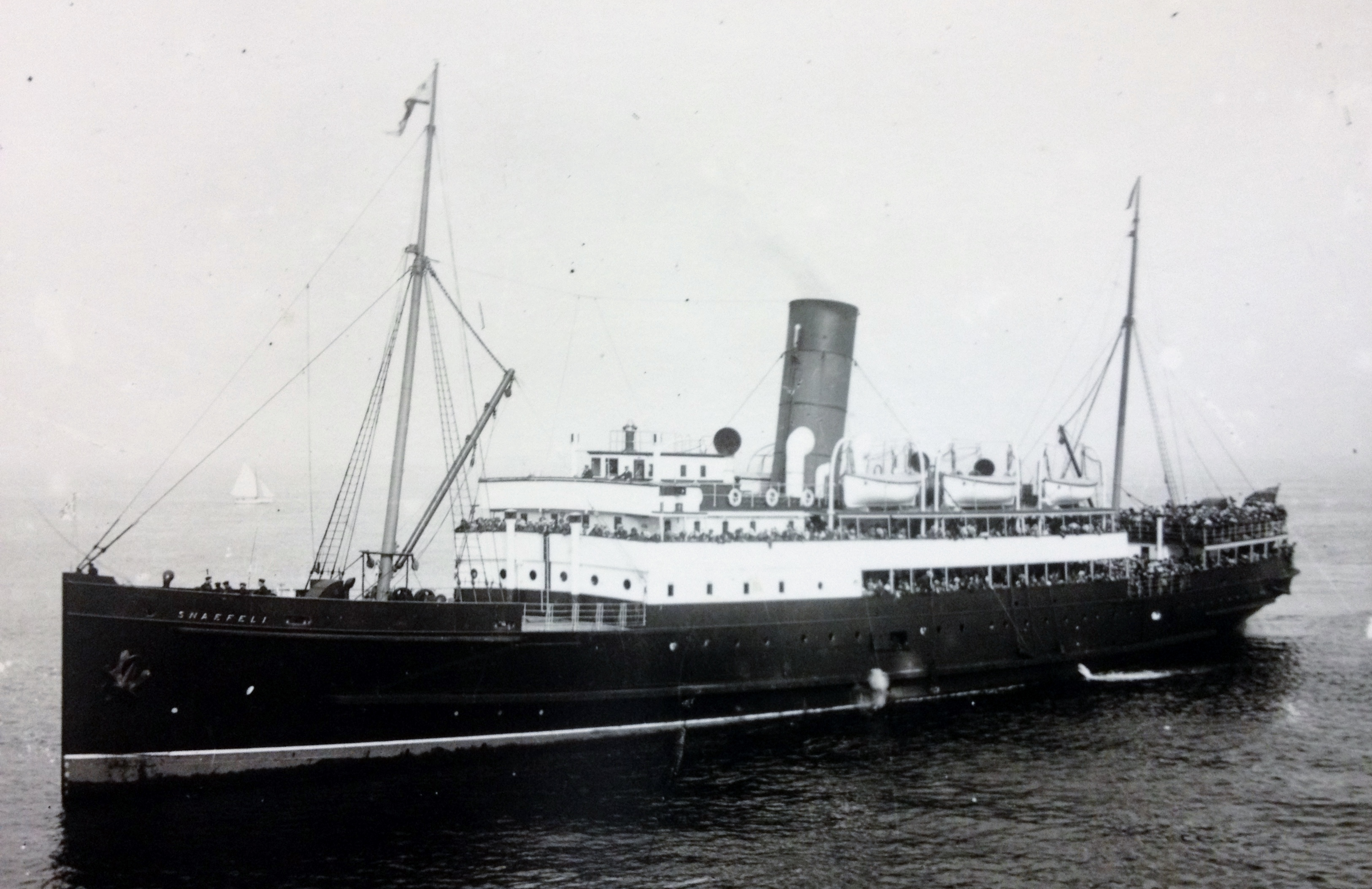
- Snaefell.

History
- Name: Snaefell
- Namesake: Snaefell
- Owner: 1910–1914: IOMSPCo1914-1918: Operated by The Admiralty
- Operator: 1910–1914: IOMSPCo. 1914-1918: The Admiralty
- Port of registry: Douglas, Isle of Man.
- Builder: Cammell Laird
- Cost: £59,275
- Yard number: 758
- Way number: 118606
- Launched: 12 February 1910
- Completed: 1910
- Maiden voyage: 28 July 1910
- In service: 1910
- Out of service: 1914
- Fate: Acquired by The Admiralty in 1914, and refitted as an Armed Patrol Vessel. Torpedoed and sunk in the Mediterranean 5 June 1918.

General characteristics
- Type: Passenger Steamer
- Tonnage: 1,368 gross register tons (GRT)
- Length: 270 ft 0 in (82.3 m)270'
- Beam: 41 ft 4 in (12.6 m)
- Depth: 16 ft 6 in (5.0 m)
- Installed power: 5,300 ihp (4,000 kW).
- Propulsion: Direct-acting inverted triple expansion engines.
- Speed: 19 knots (22 mph)
- Capacity: 1241 passengers
- Crew: 43

RMS Snaefell (III) – the third ship in the line's history to be so named – was a packet steamer operated by the Isle of Man Steam Packet Company from 1910 to 1914. She was then acquired by the Admiralty at the outbreak of the First World War, until she was torpedoed and sunk in the Mediterranean on 5 June 1918.

== Dimensions ==
Snaefell had a registered tonnage of 1,368 GRT, length 270 ft; beam 41 ft 4 in; depth 16 ft 6 in; and with a designed service speed of 19 knots. Water-tight sub-divisions were carefully designed; and there were seven water-tight bulkheads extending up to the main deck. The vessel was fitted with a cellular bottom for carrying water ballast when in summer service.

== History ==
Snaefell was built at Cammell Laird at Birkenhead in 1910, with engines and boilers also being acquired from her manufacturer. She was certified for 1241 passengers, and had a crew complement of 43.

She was fitted with two sets of vertical 4-cylinder triple-expansion engines - the first of this type in the company's ships. These developed a total indicated horsepower of 5,300 and made her a very economical and useful ship.

== Service life ==
Snaefell, despite her modest size, being a dual vessel was of some importance of marine evolution in the company's list. Designed for both cargo and passenger work, she was put on the main Douglas–Liverpool winter service. However, the ship was with the Isle of Man Steam Packet fleet for only four years.

During the summer months, she worked from both Douglas and Ramsey, usually on the company's secondary routes.

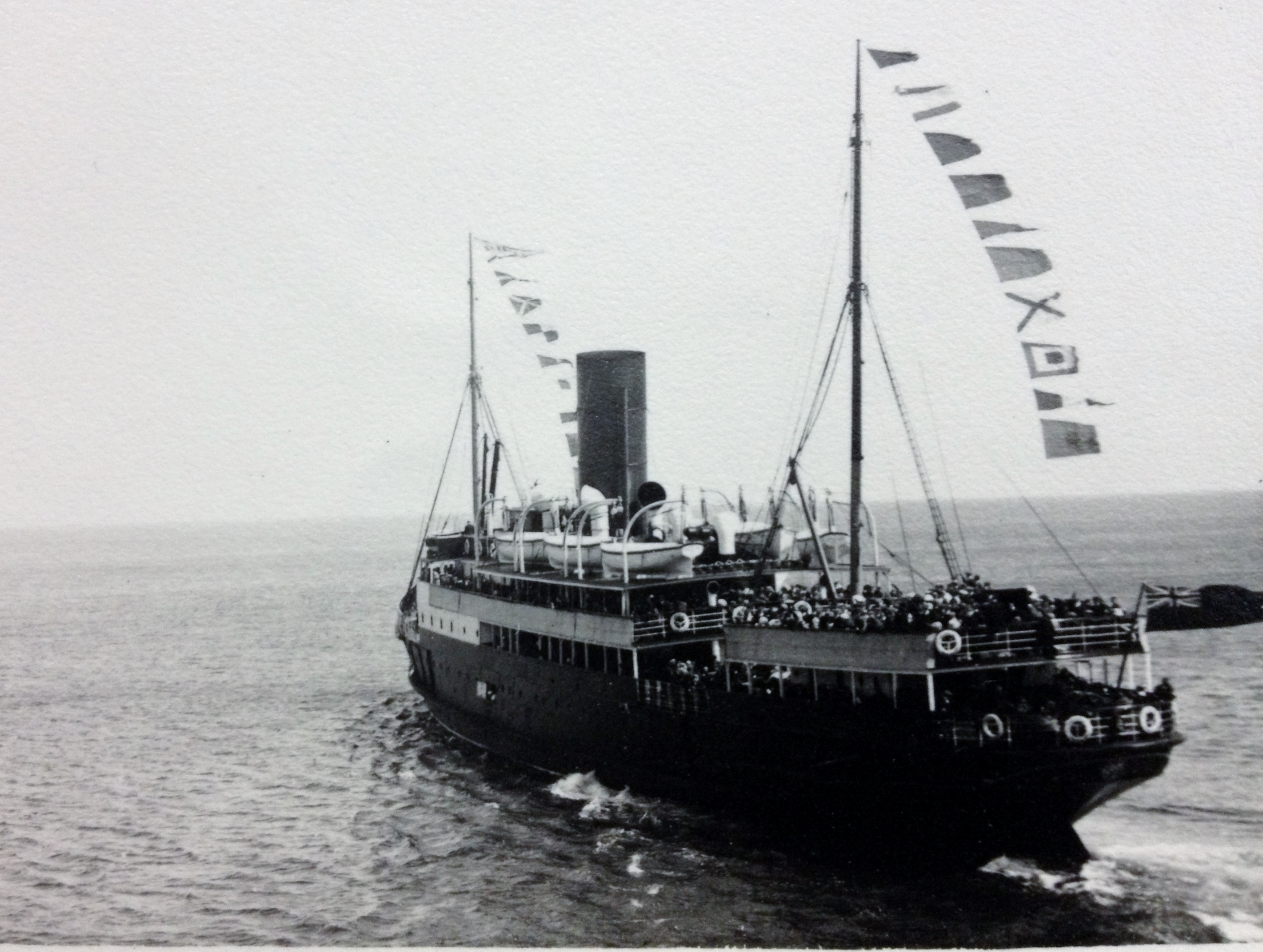
Snaefell pictured leaving Douglas.

== Mail and cargo ==
Snaefell was designed to carry a mixture of passengers and cargo. Her designation as a Royal Mail Ship (RMS) indicated that she carried mail under contract with the Royal Mail. A specified area was allocated for the storage of letters, parcels and specie (bullion, coins and other valuables). In addition, there was a considerable quantity of regular cargo, ranging from furniture to foodstuffs and even motor cars.

A popular ship, she was taken over and refitted as an Armed Boarding Vessel (A.B.V.) at the outbreak of war. This work was undertaken by the yards at Cammell Laird, and she left the Mersey in Christmas week 1914, to embark on her war service.

== War service and loss ==
The record of Snaefell is typical of the work of the steam packet company's ships in World War I. She was one, if not the first, of the company's fleet to go off on active service, and "active service" is something she witnessed in no small measure.

On being chartered by The Admiralty, she was sent to Cammell Lairds – her original builders – and was fitted with armament and given the necessary alterations. She sailed for Plymouth on 18 December 1914, armed with a rather modest complement of two 12-pounder guns, one 2-pounder anti aircraft gun; and with a ship's company of 105.

Snaefell became one of four coastal steamers in the Plymouth Patrol, and had a reasonably uneventful introduction to the war, steaming from Start Point to Land's End and then to a position in mid-Channel, on the other side of which the French Navy took over the patrol. Her duty was to intercept all shipping and issue any necessary instructions covering the likely position of enemy submarines and other such matters. It meant four days at sea and two days in port.

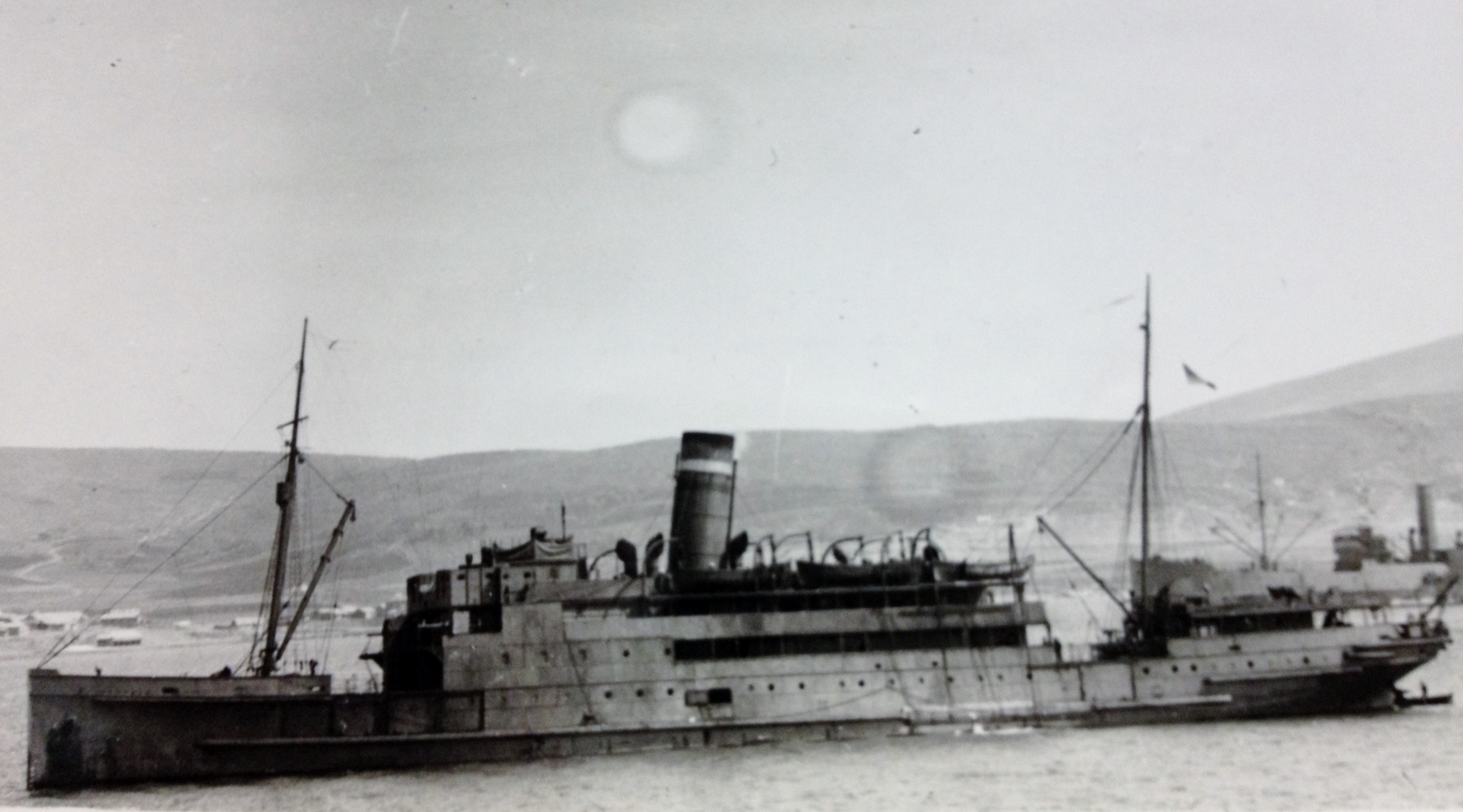
Snaefell pictured on active service.

In April 1915, the Snaefell had a minor brush with a German submarine but failed to find her target, despite being able to discharge a shot at the enemy from what seemed to be close range.

During June of that year, she received orders concerning more desperate matters, and the Sanefell was tasked to escort the monitor Ragalan to Gallipoli. Once at the Dardanelles she worked in the monitor's squadron, even carrying seaplanes which were sent up as artillery spotters for the Raglan's gunners.

It was an eventful summer for the Manx ship. She was soon based at Mudros, on Lemnos, some 60 miles from the Daredenelles. From the island she carried troops and stores to the combat area in Suvla Bay.

Early in August she was damaged by shellfire, after which she was switched to shore patrol work, closely watching the Turkish movements. During this time, she went aground and was holed. After emergency repairs, Snaefell eventually reached Alexandria, where she underwent more extensive repairs which were completed after six weeks.

Upon the completion of the repairs, she was again dispatched to active service, this time patrolling the Bulgarian Coast. This work entailed danger from floating mines, shore batteries and Bulgarian aircraft, against which at first, the Snaefell had little or no defence.

During this chapter of her service, she was holed by a six-inch shell from a Turkish battery, but once more she was lucky.

Snafell then assisted in the evacuation of the British Forces from Gallipoli, after which the ship was given troop-carrying duties for several months, on one occasion being heavily shelled by a submarine when laden with Turkish prisoners of war which she had embarked in Cyprus. She escaped during the night, and made for Alexandria.

Re-fitted in Alexandria in the spring of 1918, and after being held up by a serious fire that broke out while she was in harbour, she was finally able to leave for Malta early in June. During her voyage to Malta, the Imperial German Navy submarine SM UB-105 torpedoed and sank her in the Mediterranean Sea 240 nautical miles (440 km) east-southeast of Malta with the loss of three of her crew members.

Snaefell′s wreck position is calculated as LAT:43°36'N LON:042°49'E, 240 miles east-southeast (112.5°) of Malta.
