= SS Mona's Isle (1882) =

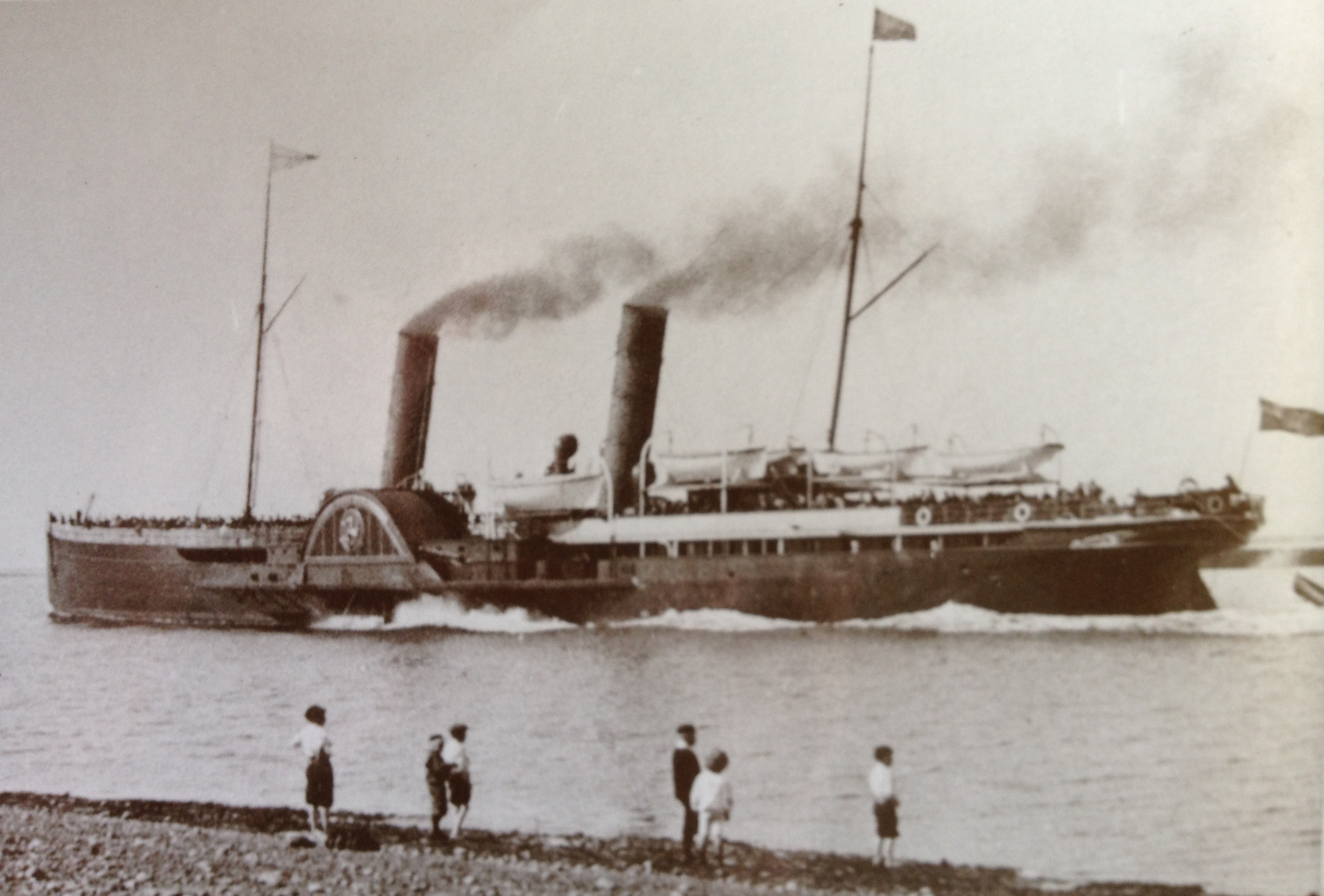
- Mona's Isle outbound in the Mersey, passing New Brighton

History
- Name: Mona's Isle
- Owner: 1882-1915: Isle of Man Steam Packet Company; 1915-1919 The Admiralty.
- Operator: 1882-1915: IoMSPCo.; 1915-1919 The Admiralty.
- Port of registry: Douglas, Isle of Man
- Route: Douglas - Liverpool, Belfast, Dublin, Fleetwood, Ardrossan.
- Builder: Caird & Co. Greenock
- Cost: £58,700
- Laid down: 1882
- Launched: 16 May 1882
- In service: 1882
- Out of service: 1915
- Identification: Official Number 76304; Code Letters P K F C
- Fate: Broken up by Thos. W. Ward at Morecambe, September 1919

General characteristics
- Type: Paddle Steamer
- Tonnage: 1,564 gross register tons (GRT)
- Length: 330 ft 7 in (100.8 m)
- Beam: 38 ft 1 in (11.6 m)
- Depth: 15 ft 1 in (4.6 m)
- Installed power: 4,500 shp (3,400 kW)
- Propulsion: Two oscillating steam engines working at 90 pounds per square inch (620 kPa) developing 4,500 shp (3,400 kW)
- Speed: 18 knots (21 mph)
- Capacity: 1,561 passengers.
- Crew: 56

SS Mona's Isle, No. 76304, the third ship in the company's history to be so named, was a paddle steamer which served with the Isle of Man Steam Packet Company until she was purchased by The Admiralty in 1915 and renamed to HMS Mona's Isle.

== Construction & dimensions ==
Mona's Isle was constructed by Caird & Co. at Greenock and was launched on Tuesday, 16 May 1882. Caird & Co. also supplied her engines and boilers.

Length 330'7"; beam 38'1"; depth 15'1". Mona's Isle had accommodation for a crew of 56, and was certificated to carry 1,561 passengers. Her engines developed 4,500 i.h.p. which gave her a service speed of 18 knots.

The engines were quite remarkable for their day. The oscillating engine had slowly developed from low pressure jet condensing with all the demerits that salt water intake involved, to higher pressure surface condensing that was the forerunner of the turbine circulating system. These were the first high-pressure engines of this type to be adopted by the Steam Packet Company. They worked at a boiler pressure of 90 p.s.i. The stroke was 90 inches with the high-pressure cylinder 65 inches in diameter and the low-pressure cylinder 112 inches. The low-pressure cylinder was said to be larger and heavier than any other fitted to a paddle steamer.

== Service life ==
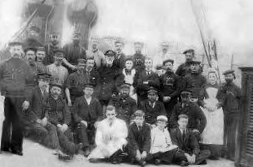
The crew of Mona's Isle (circa 1900). First Officer James Teare, who would later go on to become a Master of the line (and command Ellan Vannin on her ill-fated voyage), can be seen seated at the far left of the photograph. The stewardess in the centre of the photograph is Florence Helena Cowell (1880-1962) at eighteen years old (photograph from family collection, Isle of Man).

Mona's Isle was said to be the largest, best appointed, and most expensive steamer in the company's history up to that time. Exceptionally fast in her day, she could reach Liverpool from Douglas in only 3hr. 55min. She was the first of five rather similar paddle-steamers added to the fleet between 1882 and 1889.

On Thursday 19 June 1884, Mona’s Isle suffered a mechanical failure; one of her cylinders and a piston rod being damaged. Departing Liverpool at 13:05hrs with approximately 250 passengers embarked, Mona’s Isle cleared the Victoria Channel and set a course bound for Douglas. She passed the Tynwald, which was engaged in accompanying yachts racing in the Mersey, at 14:30hrs which reported her to be making good speed. When approximately mid-channel the mechanical failure to her machinery occurred, forcing her Master, Capt. McQueen, to come to anchor and await the arrival of assistance. As there was no wireless communication at that time, anxiety was caused in Douglas as the scheduled time of arrival of the Mona’s Isle passed, requiring the Isle of Man Steam Packet Company to contact their Liverpool office to ensure that she had departed on time. This was duly confirmed and the King Orry, under the command of Capt. Gill, was coaled and despatched in order to locate the Mona’s Isle and give assistance. At 23:15hrs the Mona’s Isle was located by the King Orry, which then took her under tow and proceeded to Douglas. Passage was slow, and it was not until 05:00hrs the following morning that the two vessels arrived in Douglas; where many people had stayed on the Victoria Pier all night, anxious to receive news. Whilst out of commission, the King Orry replaced the Mona’s Isle on the Liverpool schedule, and in turn she was replaced on the Fleetwood schedule by the Fenella.

Mona's Isle was structurally damaged in heavy seas in 1885. On passage from Douglas to Liverpool damage was done to one of her paddle wheels and they were later strengthened, with a set of new composite floats fitted in 1886. On 8 March 1887, the schooner Constance collided with Mona's Isle at Liverpool and sank without loss of life.

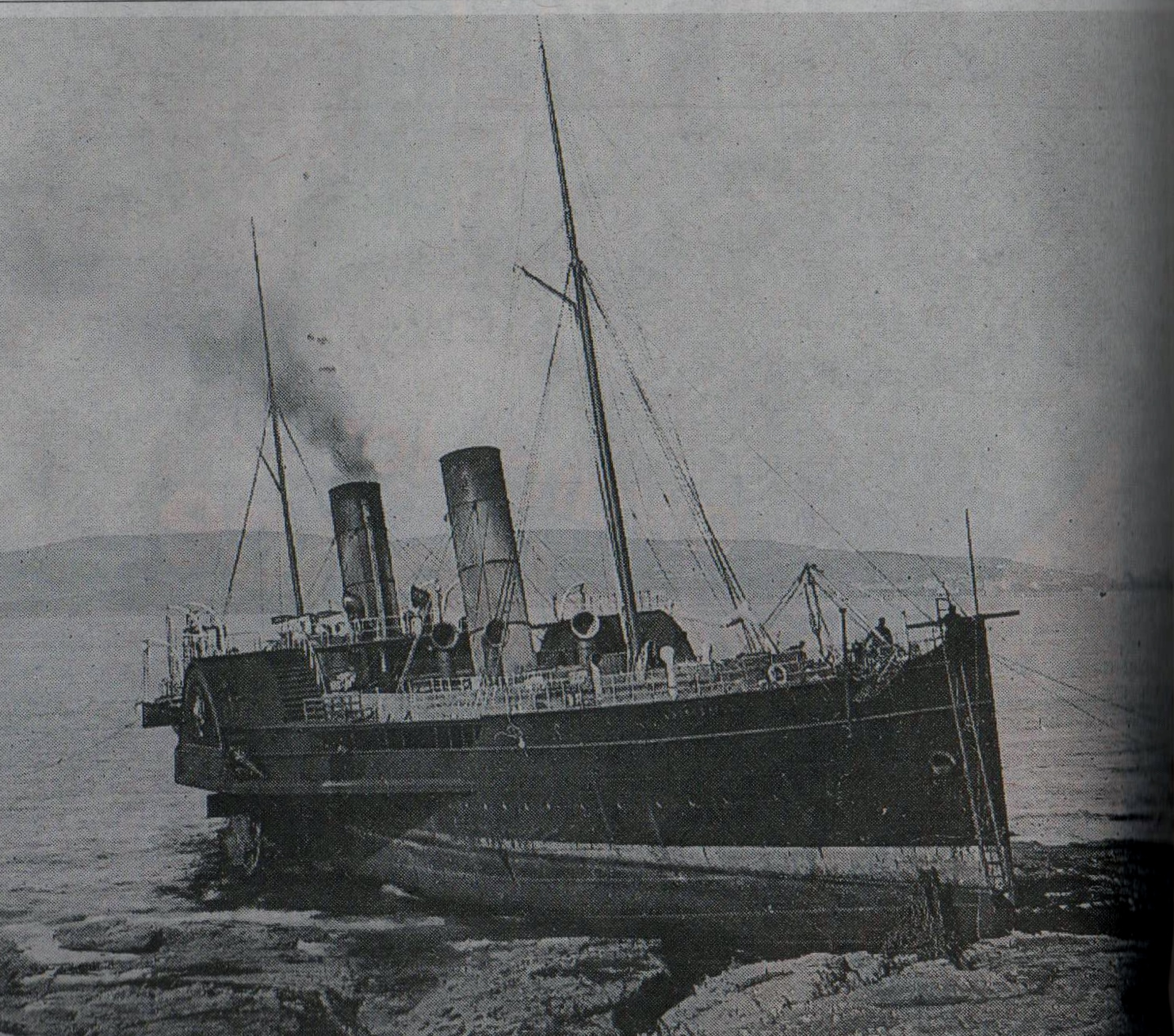
Mona's Isle ashore at Poolvaish

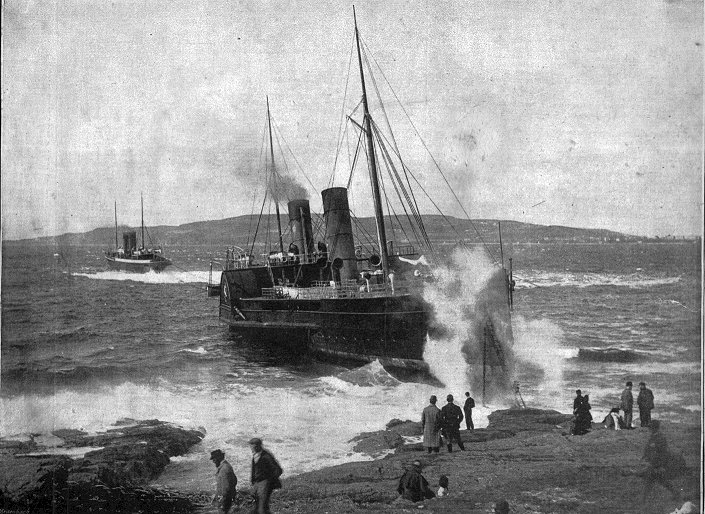
Tynwald attempts to tow Mona's Isle off the rocks at Scarlett Point.

In September 1892 she went aground at Scarlett Point, Castletown, while rounding the south of the Island, homeward bound from Dublin. She was fast aground for two days, and was re-floated after assistance from Tynwald, her passengers having previously been landed onto the rocks by way of a rather precarious ladder from her bows.

A contemporary report stated:

On the night of Tuesday, 6th September 1892, the Isle of Man Steam Packet steamer Mona's Isle ran ashore, during thick fog, between Poolvaish and the Stack at Scarlett whilst carrying some three to four hundred passengers. The vessel was under the command of Capt. Ruthven and had been returning from a day sailing to Dublin. The passengers were all very collected under the circumstances. Mr Horsham, a coastguard, heard the fog horn of a steamer blowing. When the fog lifted he discerned the whereabouts of the steamer by the signals she was sending up. He immediately fired the rocket signal and in a few moments the crews of the lifeboat and the Castletown Rocket Brigade appeared. The Rocket Corps cart, under the command of the Rev. E. Ferrier, was got out and at about quarter to twelve was close to the wreck. When the Rocket Corps got there they found that a number of the passengers had safely landed by means of ropes and ladders. The Captain did not at first seem inclined to communicate with the Rocket Corps however a little later it was decided to take the passengers off. Using rockets a hawser was made fast and by two o'clock 102 people had been landed by breeches buoy. The lifeboat was close by but she was unable to render any assistance.

At about quarter past nine the IOMSP Co. vessel, Tynwald, came steaming round Langness and dropped anchor about half a mile from the shore, in the vicinity of the Mona's Isle. The lifeboat, which had hung about all the time, also to a kedge anchor some hundred yards from the ship, kept a cable drawn taut to keep the ship steady when the tide rose. The wind at this time freshened. At about half past eleven the Tynwald fixed three hawsers to the stranded vessel, however the Mona's Isle remained firmly aground and attempts to refloat the vessel were abandoned.

During Thursday another two attempts were made to refloat the vessel but these were unsuccessful however at the following high tide, a little after midnight Friday morning, the Mona's Isle was finally refloated. The Mona's Isle and the Tynwald then made for Liverpool where the Mona's Isle went to a graving dock for a thorough survey.

— "History of the closed Lifeboat Station at Castletown – Service Calls of RNLB Hope 1885–1896"

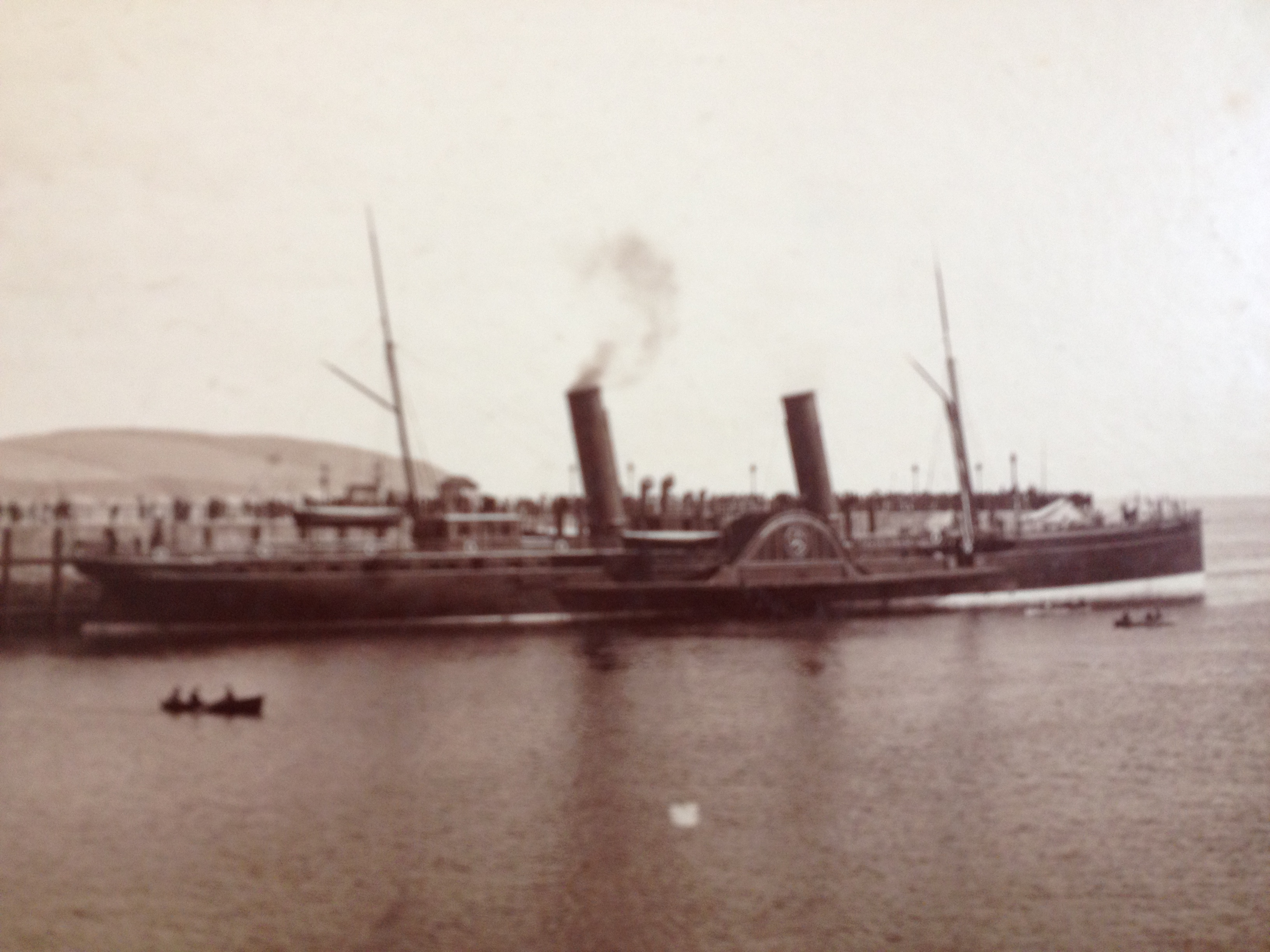
Mona's Isle at the Victoria Pier, Douglas.

In 1895 Mona's Isle was fitted with electric lighting, the consideration being £600. She was present on the south coast of England briefly in 1902, being on charter for the Fleet Review at Spithead for the coronation of King Edward VII.

== War service ==
Mona's Isle was sold to the Admiralty in 1915 and did not return to the company's fleet after the Great War. She was fitted out by Vickers in September, 1915, as a net-laying ship for anti-submarine work.

She was usually stationed at Harwich and did varied work, quite apart from net-laying. Perhaps her most noteworthy mission was to the wreck of a Dutch steamer that had been torpedoed and sunk beyond the Cork lightship off the southern Irish coast. It was known that the Dutchman had been carrying bullion, and the net-layer acted as base ship for the salvage operation. Gold valued at £86,000 was recovered, after which the paddle steamer made fast getaway from an area where German submarines were particularly menacing.

The Mona's Isle had a number of varied missions; she patrolled the west coast of Ireland, she assisted in rescue work from a sinking warship and she searched for survivors from two British submarines that had been lost.

Harold Bride, surviving wireless operator of the RMS Titanic disaster, served as wireless operator on the Mona's Isle during the war.

== Disposal ==
After the end of the war she was not fit for reconditioning, and despite being offered for sale by the Admiralty, no bids were forthcoming. Mona's Isle was broken up by Thos. W. Ward at Morecambe in September 1919.

== Official number and code letters ==
Official numbers are issued by individual flag states. They should not be confused with IMO ship identification numbers. Mona's Isle had the UK Official Number 76304 and used the Code Letters P K F C.
