= David Kewley =

David "Dawsey" Kewley
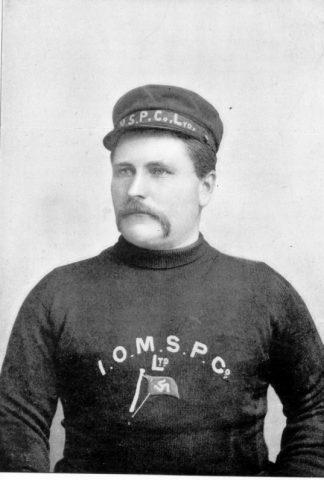
- David "Dawsey" Kewley
- Born: 1850; Douglas, Isle of Man
- Died: 25 March 1904 (aged 53–54); Douglas, Isle of Man
- Occupation: Boatman
- Employer: Isle of Man Steam Packet Company
- Known for: Renowned life saver. Honoured on numerous occasions by the Royal Humane Society for his life-saving exploits.
- Spouse: Elizabeth Cowley
- Children: David Kewley; Mary Kewley; Frances Kewley

David "Dawsey" Kewley (1850 – 25 March 1904) was a Manx boatman, member of the Douglas Rocket Brigade and volunteer in the Lifeboat Service. Reports of the number of people he saved from drowning vary – some contemporary reports claim he saved up to 38 lives while others report 25. It is generally recognized that he was directly involved in saving at least 23 people, and as a member of the Douglas Lifeboat Crew, he assisted in saving many more. He received numerous awards from the Royal Humane Society for these feats. One contemporary account reported that he would not speak about his deeds and disliked hearing other people discuss them.

== Biography ==
David Kewley (also known by his sobriquet, "Dawsey") was born in Douglas, Isle of Man in 1850, as the eighth of ten children. His father, also known as Dawsey, was a boatman and fisherman on an open lug-boat. After a limited education, Kewley joined his older brother and father in the fishing trade.

Regarded as "singularly unassuming in character, modest retiring [sic] and of a kindly nature," he took employment with the Isle of Man Steam Packet Company in 1877 as a boatman. He lived at 11 New Bond St, Douglas, and later Shaw's Brow.

Dawsey competed in numerous rowing competitions around the Isle of Man and northwest of England. He was often successful, including the early 1870s, when he was stroke oar of a crew who "caused something of a sensation." He competed in this race with three colleagues: Charles Kewin, John Cain and Hugh Rogers, on an old gig (boat) which the men had patched themselves, known as The Hobblers Boat. The team raced against several trained racing crews, and "to the astonishment of everyone, won easily". Subsequently, they won races against professional crews from Manchester and Dumbarton. They won the Duke of Devonshire's prize at Barrow-in-Furness twice, beating boatmen from Barrow led by Anthony Strong.

Dawsey was said to have been an ideal stroke oar due to his physique and technique. Dawsey competed undefeated in the pairs category with John Cain well as individually in the sculls.

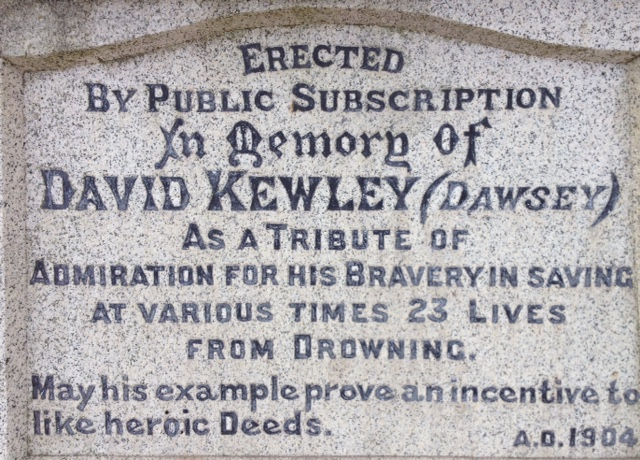
Inscription on the memorial to Dawsey Kewley.

== Rescues ==
Certain reports from contemporary sources cite what was thought to be insufficient recognition towards the endeavors of Dawsey by the Royal Humane Society. On various occasions it was questioned whether Dawsey had in fact received sufficient acknowledgement for his service. For example, he had "only" received certificates when it was generally regarded that awards from the society, such as gold, silver, and bronze medals, had been bestowed on individuals of higher social status for lesser endeavors. The High Bailiff of Douglas, Samuel Harris, was instrumental in trying to highlight this perceived short-coming. On several occasions Harris described Dawsey as "the bravest man in the town". Following numerous letters written to the society by those such as Harris, these concerns were addressed following a rescue on 28 July 1888, for which his bravery was recognised by the awarding of a bronze medal.

Detailed below are some of the various rescues in which Dawsey Kewley was involved:

=== 18 October 1878 ===
On the evening of Friday 18 October 1878, the Isle of Man Steam Packet Company steamer Snaefell was in the process of docking in Douglas Harbour when one of her passengers, Dr Hemming, fell off the ship and into the harbour. On witnessing the event, despite the darkness, Dawsey immediately jumped into the water and made towards the man, managing to take him towards a ladder by which he was able to support himself and Dr Hemming. After approximately 20 minutes a boat arrived and took both Dawsey and Dr Hemming to safety. Reports state that Dr Hemming was the third person which Dawsey had rescued within four months. For saving the life of Dr Hemming, Dawsey Kewley received his first award from the Royal Humane Society.

=== 2 August 1879 ===
On Saturday 2 August 1879, a harbour porter named Thomas Sheard fell into the water between two steamers which were docked alongside the Victoria Pier. Again Dawsey immediately jumped into the water and performed a rescue, with complete disregard for his own safety. The rescue of Sheard resulted in Dawsey receiving another award from the Royal Humane Society accompanied by a written commendation on vellum:

The Honorary Testimonial has been awarded to David Kewley by the Royal Humane Society, in recognition of his humane exertions on the 2nd day of August, 1879.

— Royal Humane Society (Instituted 1774). 4, Trafalgar Square, London W.C., 24th September, 1879.

The presentation was made by the High Bailiff of the Isle of Man at a ceremony on 25 October 1879.

=== 5 August 1882 ===
Another incident involving a harbour porter occurred in Douglas Harbour, again concerning the steamer Snaefell on Saturday 5 August 1882, a scene witnessed by hundreds of people. The Snaefell had arrived from Liverpool and was in the process of discharging its passengers when the porter, who was making his way onto the ship, fell into the water and was in danger of being drowned. A passenger on board the steamer in turn leapt into the water so as to render assistance, but he in turn quickly got himself into trouble. Kewley was alerted to the situation and jumped into the water and managed to support the two men until a rope was thrown enabling the men to be lifted from the water.

=== 30 May 1884 ===
A report of a further rescue was one of a small boy who had fallen into the inner harbour, Douglas, on Friday 30 May 1884. The young boy, who had been playing in the vicinity of the steamer Tynwald, fell into the water and due to an ebbing tide was being drawn under the vessel. Dawsey managed to get to the young boy, after some initial trouble, and brought him safely to the surface and onwards to the shore.

=== 25 September 1884 ===
On one occasion, Dawsey was in need of saving. The incident occurred on the evening of Thursday 25 September 1884, when the steamer Ben-my-Chree was securing alongside the harbour wall. Dawsey was part of a team of dockers positioning the gangway to the vessel when he slipped over, his head striking the Ben-my-Chree's sponson, and subsequently fell into the water. Temporarily stunned, Dawsey sank beneath the water, which led to the Ben-my-Chree's Third Officer, Dalzell Torrance, jumping into the water in order to save Dawsey. In time a rope was thrown to Third Officer Torrance, enabling him and the unconscious Dawsey to be pulled to the steps of the pier.

The saving of Dawsey was the fourth time Dalzell Torrance had performed a life-saving act.

=== 28 July 1888 ===
Together with another Douglas boatman, John Lewin, Dawsey saved the life of a man who had jumped off the Victoria Pier on Saturday 28 July 1888. Intent on self-harm, the man initially refused assistance, leading Dawsey to jump into the water, followed by Lewin. The man was in great difficulty in the water, however Dawsey and Lewin were able to support him and take him to the shore, from where he was taken to hospital. In recognition for this rescue, both John Lewin and Dawsey received bronze medals from the Royal Humane Society. The medals were presented to John Lewin and Dawsey by the Lieutenant Governor of the Isle of Man, Sir Spencer Walpole, at a reception on 14 November 1888. A Testimonial Fund had also been created in recognition of Dawsey's bravery which had, through public donations, raised the amount of £41 and was also presented to him at the ceremony.

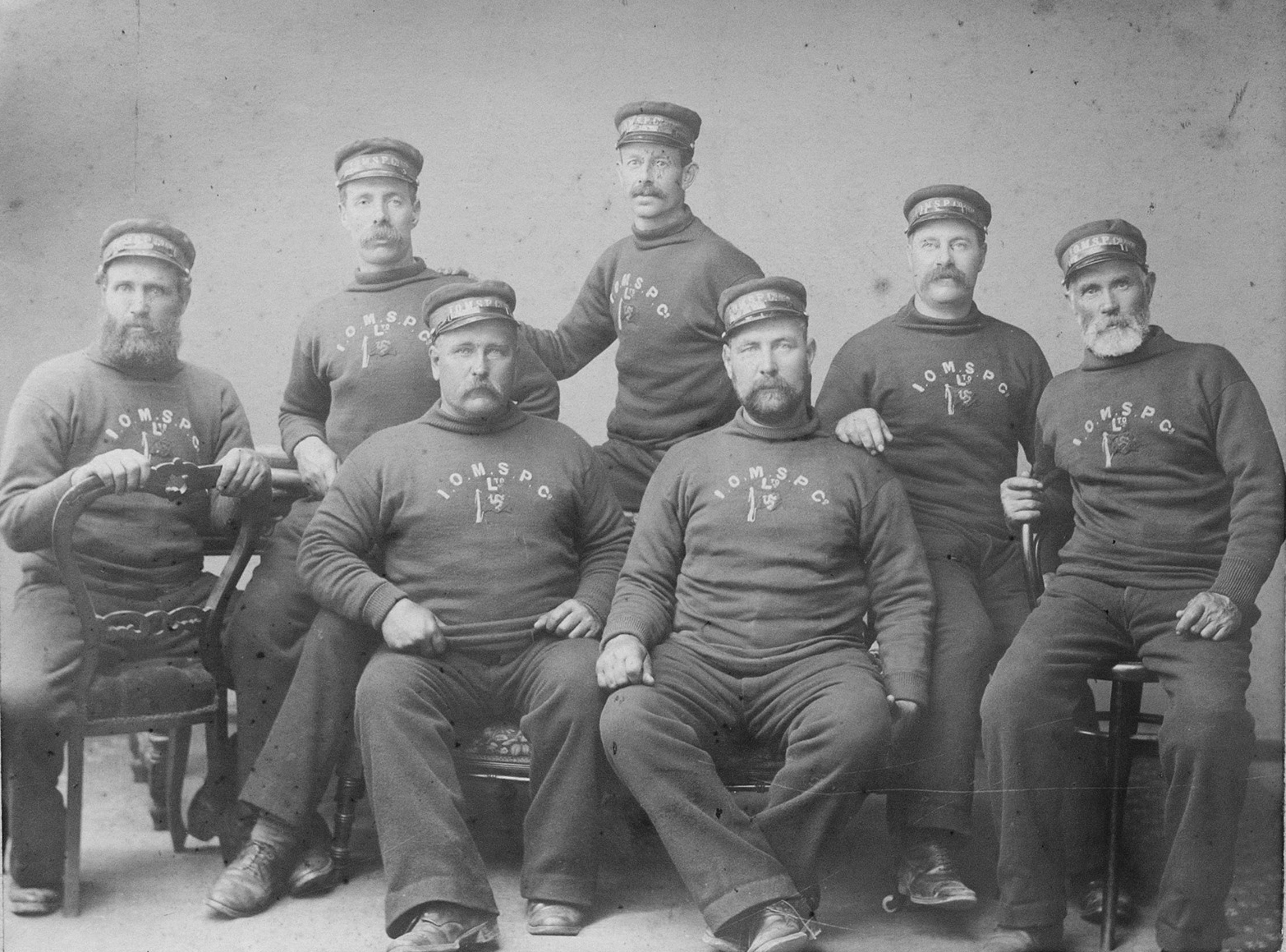
A 1900 picture of some Isle of Man Steam Packet Company landsmen. Back row (left to right) Bob Howe, Willie Higgins, Kelly, John Higgins, Paul Bridson. Front row (left to right) "Dawsey" Kewley, "Bunty" Cain. Three of those pictured were involved in the 1893 rescue of John O'Neil.

=== 9 August 1893 ===
On the afternoon of Wednesday 9 August 1893, a young boy fell into the sea whilst fishing on the Victoria Pier and was subsequently rescued by Dawsey.

=== 13 September 1893 ===
On the night of Wednesday 13 September 1893 the Isle of Man Steam Packet Company steamer, Peveril, was involved in a collision with a small boat as she was making her way from the Victoria Pier to the inner harbour at Douglas. The small boat, named the Daisy, was on its way to put a light on the yacht Vision when she cut across the Peveril's path, and was cut in two. The solitary person on board the Daisy, John "Kitty" O'Neil, jumped clear just before impact and was subsequently picked out of the water by three dockers; Dawsey, Paul Bridson and another man named Higgin, who took to a small boat in order to carry out the rescue.

== Death ==
Dawsey Kewley contracted pleurisy in February 1904. He was initially cared for at home, but was transferred to Noble's Hospital, Douglas, on 23 March and died two days later. His cause of death was given as pneumonia, which may have been attributed to his immersions in icy-cold water.

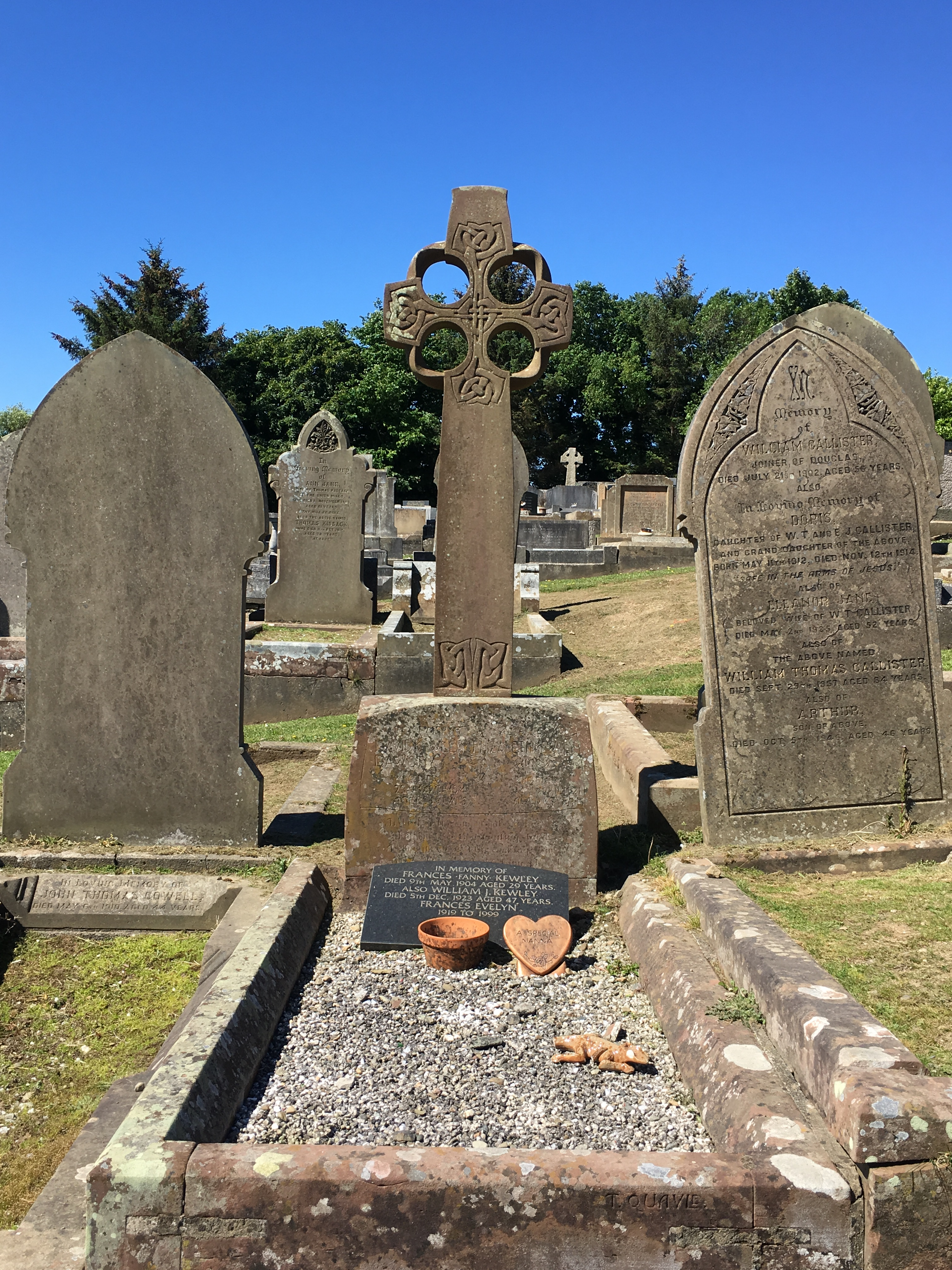
The grave of David 'Dawsey' Kewley, Braddan Cemetery, Isle of Man.

=== Funeral ===
Dawsey Kewley's funeral occurred on the afternoon of 27 March 1904. It was led by members of the Order of Foresters (Star of Mona), of which Dawsey was a member, and the Douglas Town Band. The procession left his home and travelled to St Matthew's Church, followed by a crowd. The service was conducted by the Reverend T.A. Taggart, who Dawsey had known personally. Attendees of the funeral included many from the Isle of Man Steam Packet Company, led by Dalrymple Maitland and William Hutchinson, as well as the Mayor of Douglas, members of the Lifeboat Committee, the Douglas Swimming Club and the Victoria Swimming Club. Following the service, Dawsey's body was buried at the Braddan Parish cemetery. Reports of the funeral state that the crowd of mourners stretched from the cemetery to the Quarterbridge.

Dawsey's son, David, and daughter, Mary, died in infancy. Another one of Dawsey's daughters, Frances Kewley, died less than two months after Dawsey and was buried with him. Dawsey was survived by his wife and another son.

The headstone on Dawsey's grave is a Manx runic cross, designed by Manx artist Archibald Knox; the headstone was made by Thomas Quayle & Sons, Douglas, Isle of Man.

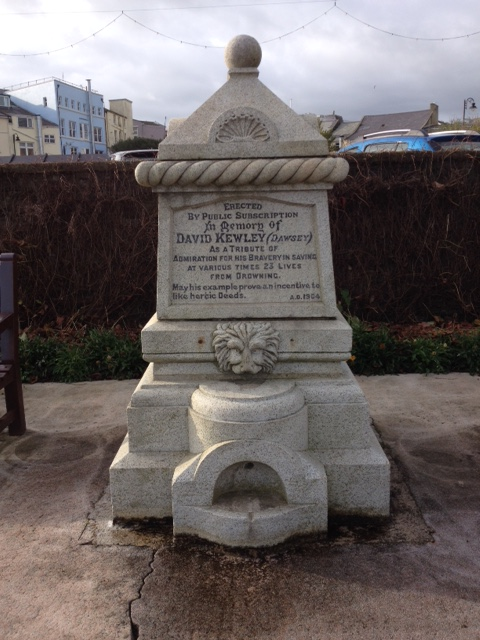
Monument to the heroism of Dawsey Kewley, Douglas, Isle of Man.

== Monument ==
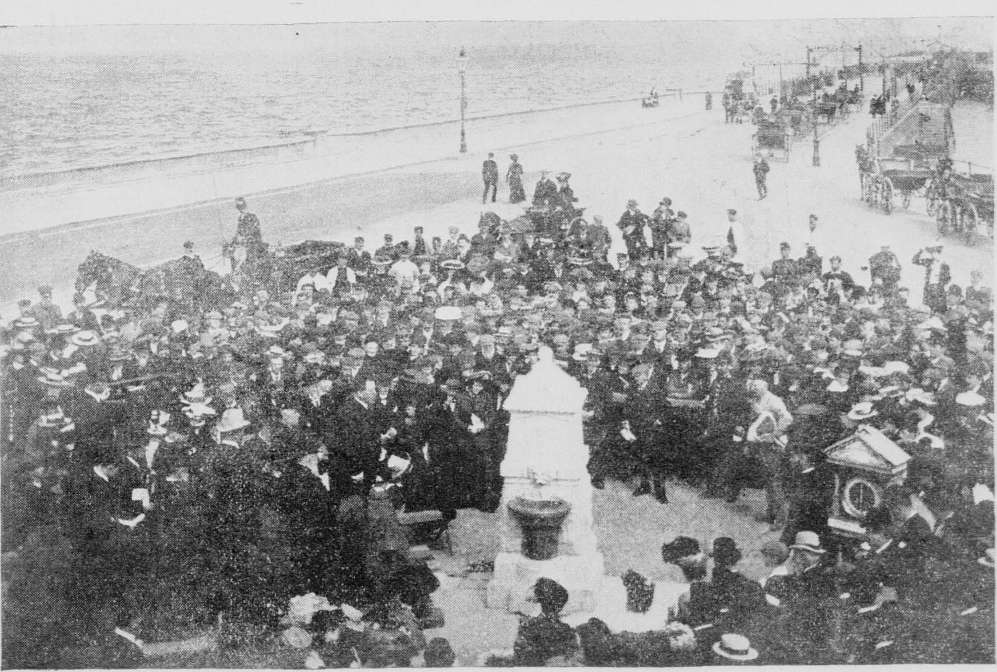
The unveiling ceremony of the monument to Dawsey Kewley. Thursday 8 June 1905.

Following Dawsey's death, a meeting presided by the Mayor of Douglas was held, where it was decided that a monument would be erected in his memory through public subscription.

The monument was erected by W. Cathcart of Glasgow and is made of Aberdeen granite. It was originally a drinking fountain and water trough with water issuing from the mouth of a stone lion. The panel above the lion is a sculpture exemplifying one of Dawsey's rescues. Originally situated at the top of the Pier Buildings on the Victoria Pier, the monument was unveiled by the Deputy Governor of the Isle of Man, Deemster Thomas Kneen, on 8 June 1905. Numerous civic dignitaries attended and two certificates from the Royal Humane Society were awarded to Samuel Webb. These were in recognition of his rescue of a young boy who had fallen into the sea off Douglas Promenade, and to G. Cowin for rescuing an elderly lady from Douglas Harbour. During the unveiling, salutes were fired from the Douglas Rocket Station and Douglas Head Lighthouse.

In the late 1960s, the new Douglas Sea Terminal was constructed, so the monument moved to the southern end of Douglas Promenade. It was moved to one of the promenade's sunken gardens following renovation work, where it remains today.

A poem was written in Dawsey's honour:

Tis said that 38 were rescued by his hand,

Yet naught did he relate of all these exploits grand.

Oh, many have fame not half as brave as he,

A man who duty made his aim and waited silently.
