= SS Peveril (1884) =

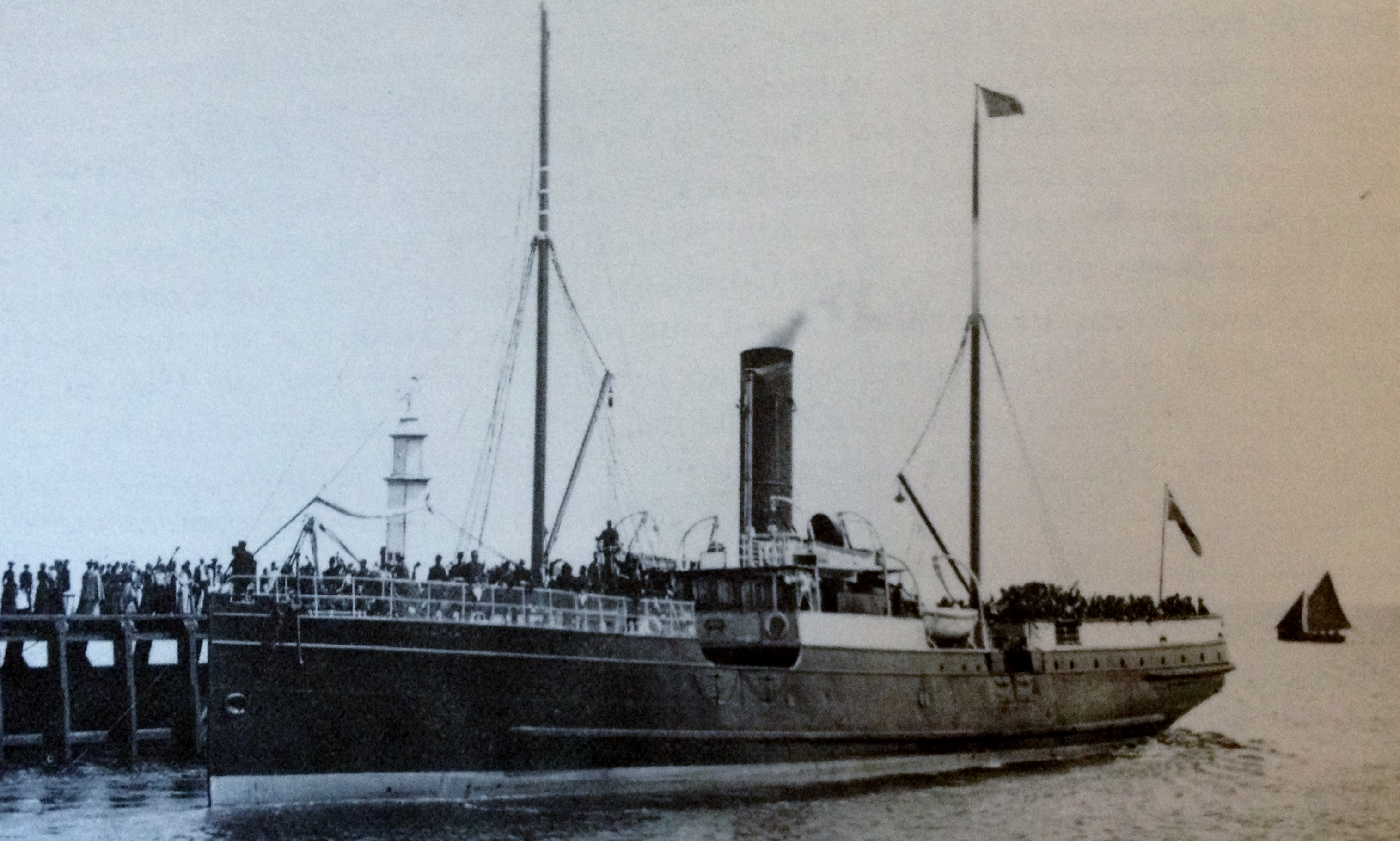
- Peveril departing Ramsey

History
- Name: Peveril
- Owner: 1884–1899: IOMSPCo
- Operator: 1884–1899: IOMSPCo
- Port of registry: Douglas, Isle of Man
- Builder: Barrow Shipbuilding Co. Barrow-in-Furness
- Cost: £20,000
- Launched: 24 May 1884
- Completed: 1884
- Identification: Official Number 76307; Code Letters J R Q V
- Fate: Sunk off Douglas after a collision with SS Monarch 16 September 1899

General characteristics
- Type: Packet Steamer
- Tonnage: 595 gross register tons (GRT)
- Length: 207 feet (63 m)
- Beam: 26 feet (7.9 m)
- Depth: 13 feet (4.0 m)
- Installed power: 1,200 shp (890 kW)
- Propulsion: Two sets of vertical compound engines, working at 85 pounds per square inch (590 kPa), producing an indicated horsepower of 1,200 shp (890 kW)
- Speed: 13.5 knots (25.0 km/h; 15.5 mph)
- Capacity: 559 passengers
- Crew: 30

SS (RMS) Peveril (I) No. 76307 – the first vessel in the company's history to be so named – was a packet steamer which was operated by the Isle of Man Steam Packet Company until she sank off Douglas following a collision with SS Monarch in 1899.

== Construction and dimensions ==
Constructed in 1884 by the Barrow Shipbuilding Company, Barrow-in-Furness, Peveril was launched on Thursday 24 May 1884. The Barrow Shipbuilding Company also supplied Peveril's engines and boilers. The Peveril was, like Fenella, schooner rigged.

The wheelhouse was situated amidships and there was a flying bridge for the captain. Four repeating telegraphs by Chadburn were installed allowing direct communication with the engine room.

Length 207'; beam 26'; depth 13'; with an i.h.p. of 1,200. Peveril had a design speed of 13.5 knots, but is recorded as reaching 15 knots on her acceptance sailing.

Her passenger accommodation was well appointed, with the upholstering carried out by Messers Townsend & Ward, Barrow. Peveril's lower saloon and ladies' cabins were heated by steam.

Passenger capacity is recorded at 559, which was 55 more than her older sister, Fenella. Peveril had crew accommodation for 30.

== Service life ==
Sister ship to Fenella, Peveril was intended for general cargo work in the main season and for passenger relief service in winter. In addition to this, Peveril also performed numerous summer cruises and excursions between Douglas and Ramsey.

Peveril made her acceptance sailing from Barrow to Douglas on Saturday 21 June 1884, under the command of Capt. Keig. She left the Hilpsford Buoy at Ramsden Dock at 09:49, arriving at Douglas at 12:51, covering the 44 nautical miles at a speed of 14 knots (26 km/h; 16 mph).

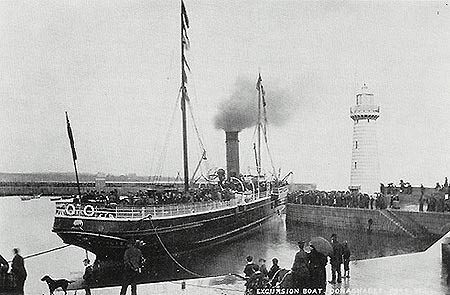
RMS Peveril.

On nearing Douglas a gun was fired from the Peveril, and guns were also fired in celebration from the Fort Anne Hotel, with large cheering crowds reported to have assembled on the Victoria Pier. On board the Peveril were members of the Isle of Man Steam Packet Company Board and also Mr W. John, manager of the Barrow Shipbuilding Company.

Shortly after 14:00, having embarked a further group of dignitaries, the Peveril departed Douglas Harbour for a trial run to Maughold Head. During the course of the run, luncheon was served, and upon reaching Maughold Head a gun was fired from the Peveril, and she then continued into Ramsey Bay.

On Wednesday 14 December 1887, the body of a woman was discovered between the casing and the boiler of the Peveril's port side. It was believed that the woman secreted herself in the narrow passage for warmth and consequently suffocated.

On the night of Wednesday 13 September 1893, The Peveril was involved in a collision with a small boat as she was making her way from the Victoria Pier to the inner harbour at Douglas. The small boat, named the Daisy, was on its way to put a light on the yacht Vision when she cut across the Peveril's path, and was cut in two. The solitary person on board the Daisy, John "Kitty" O'Neil, jumped clear just before impact and was subsequently picked out of the water by three dockers (David "Dawsey" Kewley, Paul Bridson and another man named Higgin), who took to a small boat in order to carry out the rescue.

On Saturday 12 January 1895, the Peveril sustained damage whilst in the process of docking at Douglas. Under the command of Captain Hill, the Peveril had departed Liverpool on schedule bound for Douglas, but during the course of the passage she encountered severe weather in the form of a south-easterly Gale. Challenging conditions awaited the Peveril as she approached Douglas, and as a consequence of the wind direction coupled to a large swell in the harbour, the decision was made for the Peveril to dock at the Battery Pier as opposed to the Victoria Pier. Although it was low water Captain Hill then decided to proceed to Peel on the west coast of the Isle of Man so as to receive maximum shelter. As she was breaking away from the pier, the Peveril swung round against the pier and broke one of her propellers, so that she then had to be taken into the inner harbour at Douglas for shelter. However, as she again proceeded to break away from the Battery Pier she was involved in another mishap. Being less manoeuvrable because of her disabled propeller, she struck her stern against the pier, with such force that one of the plates on her stern was stove in and two of the piles of the fender of the pier were broken away by the impact. Finally the Peveril was positioned into the inner harbour, where she was moored at the North Quay. The damage sustained was promptly repaired and she was able to resume her schedule on Monday morning with only a minor delay.

It was also during the course of this storm that the Douglas Lifeboat, Civil Service No 6, broke from her moorings at the Fort Anne Jetty and was discovered on the Sunday morning completely wrecked.

When ten years old, she was fitted with electric lighting. Fifty-seven points were installed, and these installations were considered so successful, that it was decided to install a similar lighting system to Mona's Isle, King Orry and Snaefell.

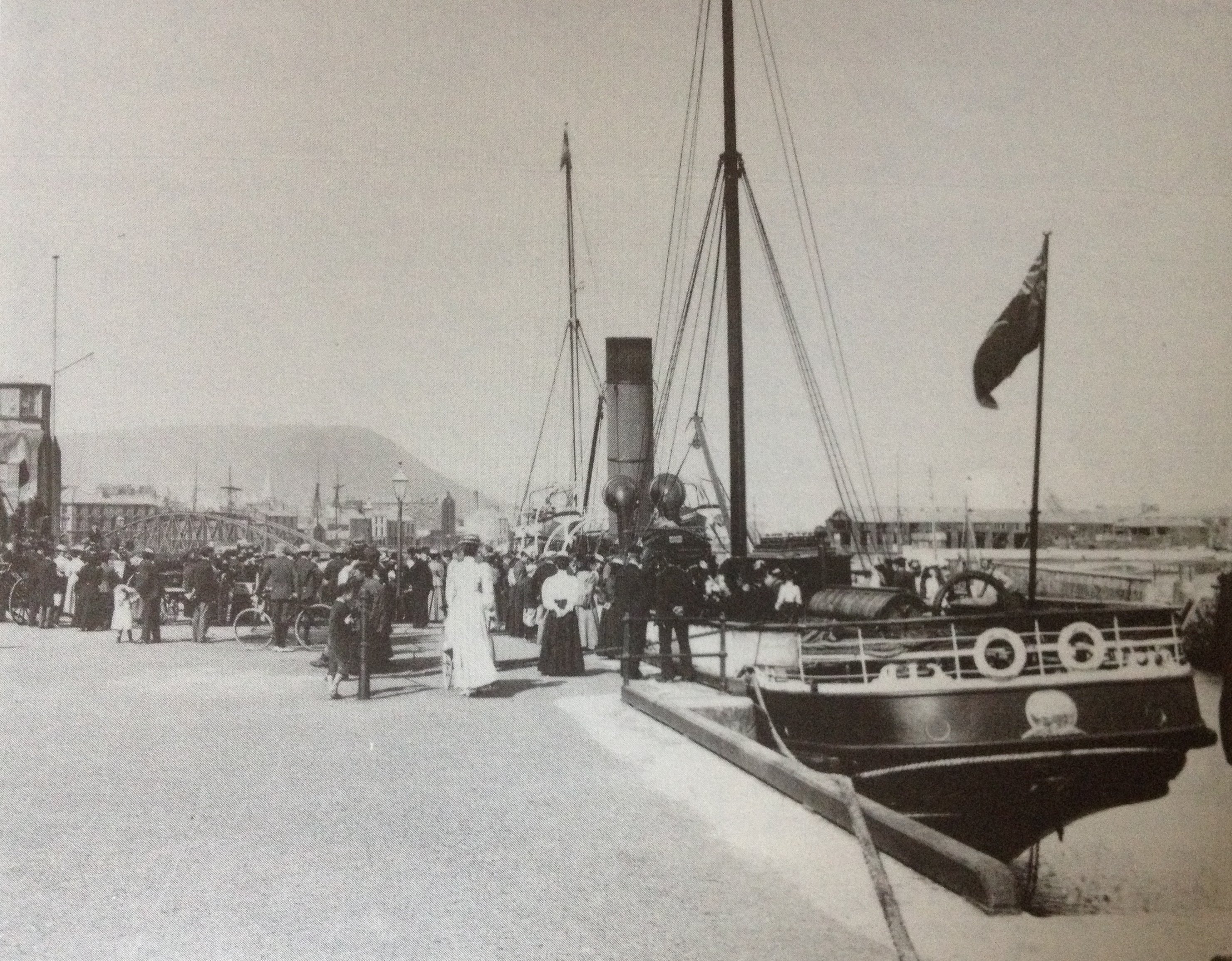
Peveril pictured at Ramsey.

On Thursday 23 January 1896, the Isle of Man's new Lieutenant Governor, Lord Henniker was conveyed to the Isle of Man on board the Peveril.

=== Mail and cargo ===
Peveril was designed to carry a mixture of passengers and cargo. Her designation as a Royal Mail Ship (RMS) indicated that she carried mail under contract with the Royal Mail. A specified area was allocated for the storage of letters, parcels and specie (bullion, coins and other valuables). In addition, there was a considerable quantity of regular cargo, ranging from furniture to foodstuffs.

== Sinking ==
After 15 years service with the company's fleet, she was sunk off Douglas on the night of 16 September 1899, following a collision with SS Monarch. The weather for the passage was fine, with a clear night sky, good visibility and a calm sea.

The Peveril, under the command of Capt. William Woods, departed Queen's Dock, Port of Liverpool at 19:50 and passed the Bar Lightship at 21:17 when she set a course bound for Douglas.

Capt. Woods left the bridge shortly after this course was set, leaving First Officer Thomas Webb on the bridge. First Officer Webb was subsequently replaced by Second Officer J. Collister, but returned at 00:10, by which time the Peveril was maintaining her course, and proceeding at full speed.

At 00:25 as the Peveril was nearing Douglas, both First Officer Webb and the Peveril's lookout, A.B. Joseph Corris observed the masthead light and then the port navigation lights of another vessel which could be seen off the Peveril's starboard quarter, with the range decreasing and the bearing remaining constant. These were the lights of the steamer Monarch, making passage from Workington to Swansea.

The Monarch (No. 90117), was an iron-built schooner-rigged steamer, and was of 113 tons. She was built by Mollwaine, Lewis & Co., Belfast in 1885, and was owned and operated by Alexander King Ltd, Belfast.

She was sailing under the command of her Master, Captain Alexander McCullough and with a crew of 10. At the time of the incident, Captain McCullough had been in command of the Monarch for 18 months, and had been in the employ of the Belfast Steam Ship Company for three and a half years.

The Monarch had departed Workington at 19:30, carrying 360 tons of flue-ash (a valuable ore-bearing material) for the Villiers Spelter Company, Swansea. She arrived off St Bees Head at 20:35 and set a course for Skerries.

As both vessels neared a position southeast of Douglas Isle of Man, the Monarch's helmsman F. Burns, and her lookout, George Caddell, spotted the light on the Peveril's masthead away to port.

The starboard light of the Peveril and the port light of the Monarch maintained a constant bearing, and neither ship appeared to alter course. Approximately two minutes before the collision, First Officer Webb ordered the Peveril's helm hard to starboard and gave two blasts on the ship's whistle. At the same time, Captain McCullough ordered "full astern" on the Monarch's ship's telegraph.

Approximate position of Peveril's wreck

At 01:00, 14 miles southeast of Douglas, the Monarch rammed the Peveril amidships, just abreast of the funnel, flooding the engine room. On the bridge of the Peveril at the time of collision, were First Officer Thomas Webb, Second Officer J. Collister, Corris the lookout and a helmsman.

Upon collision, the Monarch rebounded clear of the Peveril, and as the Peveril shot ahead, First Officer Webb stopped engines. Following the collision all hands were immediately on deck, and Captain Woods, who was below at the time, took command.

It was clear to Capt. Woods that the vessel would founder, and the necessary provisions were made to abandon ship. The Monarch stood by whilst the Peveril's lifeboats were lowered, which then made their way towards the Monarch. There were 30 crew members on board the Peveril and one passenger (Mr. Robert Henry Pitts, of Johannesburg, South Africa). The Peveril was carrying a full complement of cargo, valued at £7 per ton.

On carrying out a muster upon reaching the Monarch, it was discovered that the ship's two Firemen (J. Crellin and J. Crowe), together with an engineer (Matthew Ruthen) were missing. First Officer Webb returned to the Peveril and was successful in assisting all three crew members to safety, clearing the lower part of the ship just as the stokehold became flooded.

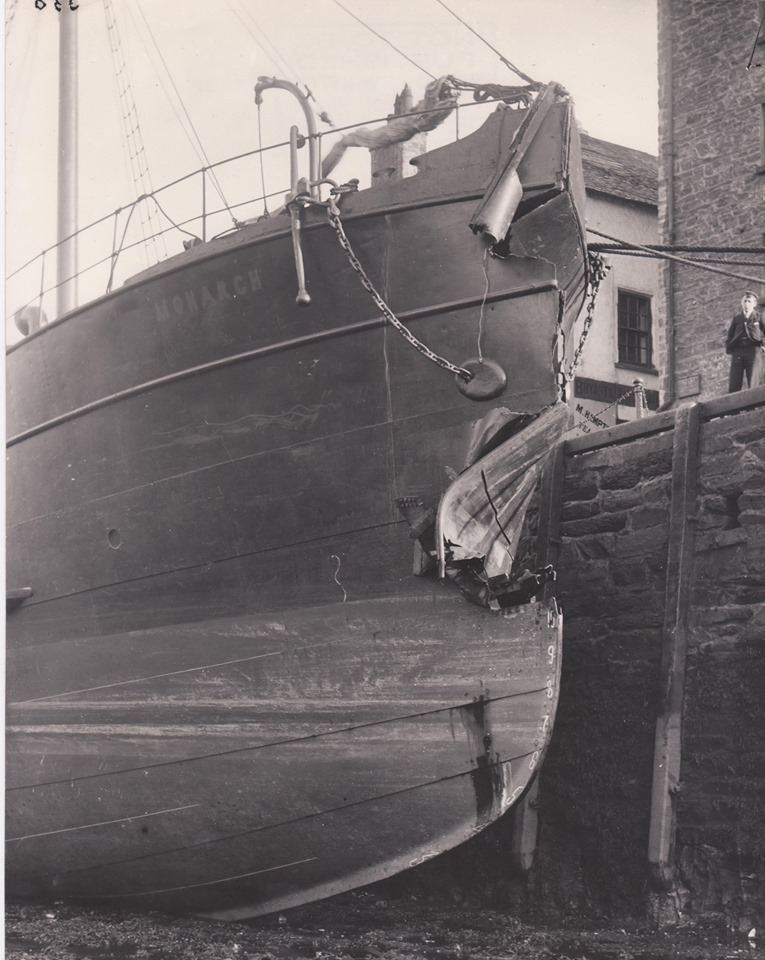
SS Monarch pictured at the South Quay, Douglas, following her collision with Peveril. The extensive damage to her bow is clearly visible.

Also thought to be missing was Mr. John Howe, who was described as "an old blind fiddler, who earned his living by musically entertaining passengers onboard." However, after making his way to the stern of the vessel, he was able to lower himself into a lifeboat with the aid of a crew member.

The Peveril sank stem first in 40 minutes. The position of the wreck of Peveril is given as 54°01′0″N 4°11′0″W.

== Aftermath ==
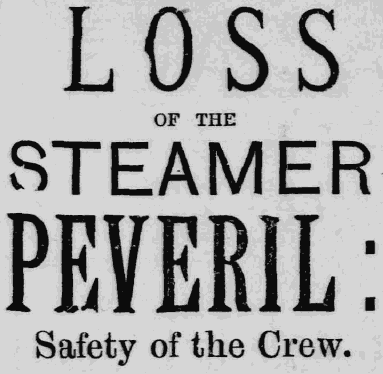
Headline in the Ramsey Courier regarding the loss of the RMS Peveril; Tuesday 19 September 1899.

The Monarch then made her way to Douglas Harbour with the Peveril's solitary passenger, her ship's company aboard; and towing two of her lifeboats astern.

Monarch arrived at the Victoria Pier at 04:00.

However, the Monarch had also sustained serious damage. Her stem was stoved in, and, had it not been for an extra-strong collision bulkhead, she may well also have foundered. On discharging the Peveril's crew and passenger, the Monarch moved across the harbour to the Red Pier, and then to the South Quay in order for repairs to be effected, where she attracted considerable attention from the public, with several thousand people reported to have visited the quay to view the damage. A report in the Ramsey Courier; Tuesday 19 September 1899, stated that the Monarch's bow was covered by canvas in order to obscure the result of the impact, but the entirety could not be fully hidden. Damage could be seen in the shape of a hole, extending several feet below the waterline, as well as damage to her plating stretching back approximately 20 feet as a consequence of striking the Peveril's belting.

Mr. T. P. Ellison, Manager of the Isle of Man Steam Packet Company, was approached by several journalists, but declined to make any statement regarding the incident. He also refused to give his permission when asked if either Capt. Woods or First Officer Webb would be allowed to give an interview regarding the collision.

Capt. Woods was described in a local paper as:-

Captain Woods is a sailor of the good old-fashioned type. A genial and capable man; a man well liked by all by whom he is known. He is a man who has proved himself over and over again, to be a commander which any Company may be proud to possess, and he has the sympathy of all. Although, apparently, not in the slightest degree responsible for the mishap, he, without doubt, must feel the loss of his ship very keenly.

— The Ramsey Courier. Tuesday 19 September 1899.

In accordance with the provisions of The Merchant Shipping Act 1894, both First Officer Webb of the Peveril together with Captain McCullough of the Monarch were summoned to appear before an inquiry held at the Custom House, Douglas, on Monday 18 September 1899, presided over by the Receiver of Wrecks, Mr. M. J. Cahill, as to the events surrounding the loss of the Peveril.

During the course of the hearing, unsurprisingly, Mr. Webb blamed the Monarch stating:-

The cause of the casualty, was that the other vessel was travelling at a greater speed than I (First Officer Webb) had calculated; and it (the collision) may well have been avoided by the Monarch starboarding half a point.

— Mr. Thomas Webb. The Isle of Man Times. Tuesday 19 September 1899.

As would be expected, during the course of his deposition, Capt. McCullough made a different assertion:-

I could not understand why the other vessel continued on its course, as my red light was exposed to its green light, and both lights burning brightly. I consider that, according to rules preventing collision at sea, the other vessel should have given me way. In my opinion, the cause of the casualty was negligence on the part of those in charge of the Peveril, and it may have been avoided by the Peveril's helm being positioned so as to get round the stern of my vessel

— Capt. Alexander McCullough. The Isle of Man Times. Tuesday 19 September 1899.

From the International Regulations for Preventing Collisions at Sea, it would appear that the crew of the Peveril were to blame. International Regulations for Preventing Collisions at Sea; Part B – Steering and sailing; Section II (for vessels in sight of one another); Article 15. Crossing situations stating:-

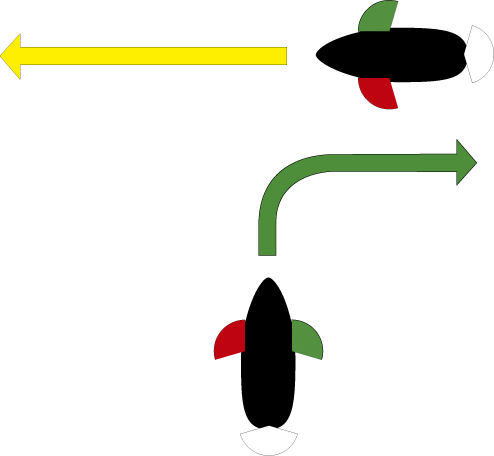
Illustration of how vessels should avoid each other when a risk of collision exists. ("The vessel on the right, is in the right").

"When two power-driven vessels are crossing so as to involve risk of collision, the vessel which has the other on her starboard side shall keep out of the way and shall, if the circumstances of the case admit, avoid crossing ahead of the other vessel."

The following Wednesday (20 September) wreckage from the RMS Peveril was found washed-up on the beach at Lytham St Annes. The items included barrels of oil, cases of fish and butter and numerous deck chairs.

== Trivia ==
- Capt. William Woods was first officer on board the Mona when she was involved in a collision, and sank in the Mersey in 1883. He was also the first officer on board Peveril's older sister Fenella, when she went aground on the Half Tide Rock in the Menai Strait, on 9 September 1884.
- The Peveril had initially been scheduled to leave Liverpool at 08:00 on the morning of 16 September. However, owing to a technical fault with another steamer tasked to operate a schedule, Peveril's departure was re-arranged. However, the other vessel was subsequently ready to depart in time, and took her own sailing, the Peveril leaving later. Even with its rescheduled timing it was intended for the Peveril to depart Liverpool at 19:00, but owing to the tidal conditions in the Mersey, the sailing was delayed until 19:50. Had the Peveril sailed at the time for which she had originally been scheduled, or even the rescheduled time, the collision would not have occurred.
- Mr. John Thomas Howe, the "old, blind fiddler," had been a seafarer, and had worked for the Harrison Line rising to the rank of Chief Steward. However, as a consequence of cataracts, his eyesight began to fail him, and he took to playing music in an effort to "maintain himself and his family," and this he had been doing for the previous 16 years. With the sinking of the Peveril, Mr. Howe lost his watch and chain, his clothes, his concertina and all the money he had earned that summer - his "hard-earned savings."
- First Officer Thomas Webb was the son of the then Mayor of Douglas; Mr. Samuel Webb.
- Amongst the cargo consignment on board the Peveril, were several pictures belonging to the renowned Manx art nouveau designer, Archibald Knox. Knox subsequently brought a Civil Action against the Isle of Man Steam Packet Company in the Common Law Division of the High Court, Douglas, Isle of Man, on Monday 4 December 1899, in respect of a claim for the loss of his property, in the sinking of the Peveril.
- The Isle of Man Steam Packet Company received a sum of £13,500 from their underwriters in receipt for the loss of the Peveril. This was lodged with their bankers, and was subsequently lost, along with a large proportion of their cash reserves, in the Dumbell's Bank Crash of 1900.
