= SS Monarch (1884) =

Steam ship

History
- Name: Monarch
- Owner: 1885– Alexander King Ltd, Belfast.
- Operator: 1885- Alexander King Ltd, Belfast.
- Port of registry: Belfast
- Builder: McIlwaine, Lewis & Co., Belfast
- Launched: 4 December 1884
- Completed: 1885
- Identification: Official Number: 90117
- Fate: Foundered 12 June 1919

General characteristics
- Type: Tramp Steamer
- Tonnage: 310 gross register tons (GRT)
- Length: 155 feet (47 m)
- Beam: 22 feet (6.7 m)
- Depth: 11 feet (3.4 m)
- Installed power: 600 shp (450 kW)
- Propulsion: Screw-propeller
- Speed: Approximately 10 knots (19 km/h; 12 mph)
- Crew: 10

SS Monarch No. 90117 was a tramp steamer which was operated by Alexander King Ltd, Belfast. She was involved in a collision with the Isle of Man Steam Packet Company steamer RMS Peveril, off Douglas, Isle of Man in the early hours of 17 September 1899, resulting in the sinking of the Peveril.

== Construction and dimensions ==
The Monarch was built by Mollwaine, Lewis & Co., Belfast in 1885, and was owned and operated by Alexander King Ltd, Belfast.

Length 155'; beam 22'; depth 11'; with an i.h.p. of 600. Monarch had a design speed of approximately 10 knots.

== Collision with the RMS Peveril ==
On the night of Saturday 16 September 1899, under the command of her Master, Captain Alexander McCullough, the Monarch left Workington, Cumberland, with a cargo of 360 tons of flue-ash (a valuable ore-bearing material) for the Villiers Spelter Company, Swansea.

She arrived off St Bees Head at 20:35 and set a course for Skerries.

The Peveril was a dual passenger and cargo steamer owned and operated by the Isle of Man Steam Packet Company. She was built by the Barrow Shipbuilding Company, Barrow-in-Furness in 1884, and was of 595 gross register tons (GRT)

Under the command of her Master, Capt. William Woods, Peveril departed Queen's Dock, Port of Liverpool at 19:50 and passed the Bar Lightship at 21:17 when she set a course bound for Douglas.

At 00:25 as the Monarch was to the northeast of Douglas, Isle of Man, her lookout, George Caddell, spotted the light on the Peveril's masthead away to port. On board the Peveril, First Officer Thomas Webb and the Peveril's lookout, A.B. Joseph Corris observed the masthead light and then the port navigation lights of another vessel which could be seen off the Peveril's starboard quarter, with the range decreasing and the bearing remaining constant.

The starboard light of the Peveril and the port light of the Monarch maintained a constant bearing, and neither ship appeared to alter course. With collision imminent, Captain McCullough ordered "full astern" on the Monarch's ship's telegraph, and this instruction was duly carried out by her chief engineer, Morris Flinn. At the same time, First Officer Webb ordered the Peveril's helm hard to starboard and gave two blasts on the ship's whistle.

At 01:00, 14 miles southeast of Douglas. the Monarch rammed the Peveril amidships, just abreast of the funnel, flooding the engine room.

Upon receiving a report of the damage inflicted, it was clear to Capt. Woods that the Peveril would founder, and the necessary provisions were made to abandon ship. The Monarch stood by whilst the Peveril's lifeboats were lowered, which then made their way towards the Monarch. There were 30 crew members on board the Peveril and one passenger.

The Peveril sank stem first in 40 minutes. The position of the wreck of Peveril is given as 54°01′0″N 4°11′0″W.

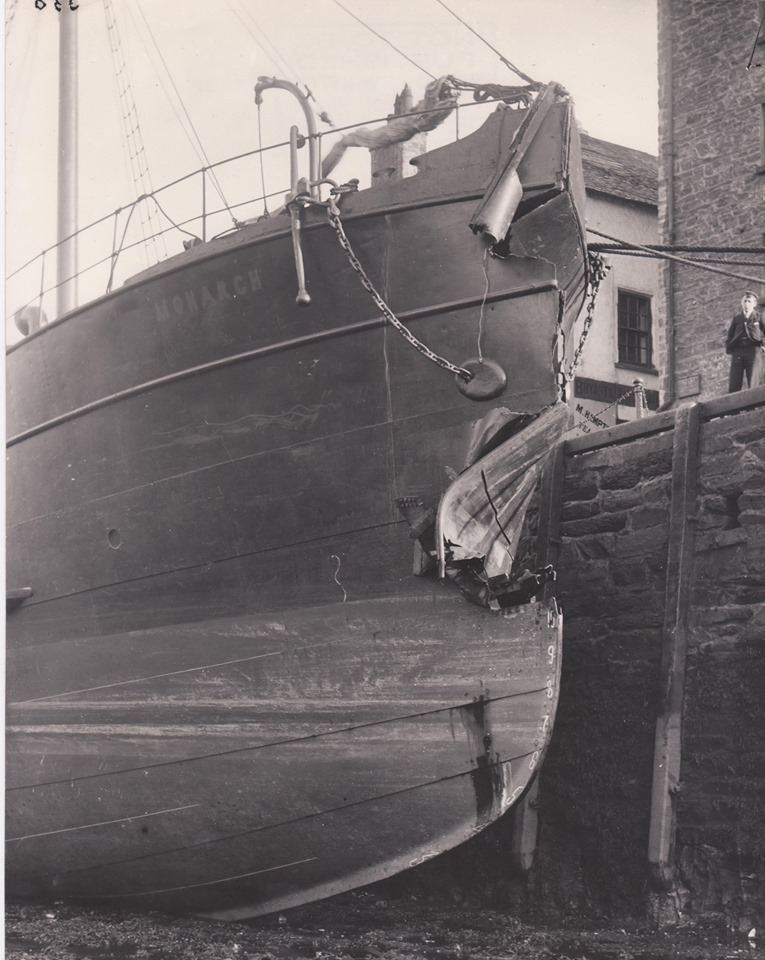
SS Monarch pictured at the South Quay, Douglas, following her collision with Peveril. The extensive damage to her bow is clearly visible.

== Aftermath ==
The Monarch then made her way to Douglas Harbour with the Peveril's solitary passenger, her ship's company aboard; and towing two of her lifeboats astern.

Monarch arrived at the Victoria Pier at 04:00.

However, the Monarch had also sustained serious damage. Her stem was stoved in, and had it not been for an extra-strong collision bulkhead she may well also of foundered. On discharging the Peveril's crew and passenger, the Monarch moved across the harbour to the Red Pier; and then to the South Quay in order for repairs to be effected, where she attracted considerable attention from the public. A report in the Ramsey Courier; Tuesday, 19 September 1899, stated that the Monarch's bow was covered by canvas in order to obscure the result of the impact, but the entirety could not be fully hidden. Damage could be seen in the shape of a hole, extending several feet below the waterline, as well as damage to her plating stretching back approximately 20 feet, as a consequence of striking the Peveril's belting.

In accordance with the provisions of the Merchant Shipping Act 1894 (57 & 58 Vict. c. 60), both First Officer Webb of the Peveril, together with Captain McCullough of the Monarch were summoned to appear before an inquiry held at the Custom House, Douglas, on Monday 18 September 1899, presided over by the Receiver of Wrecks, Mr. M. J. Cahill, as to the events surrounding the loss of the Peveril.

During the course of the hearing, unsurprisingly, Mr. Webb blamed the Monarch stating:-

The cause of the casualty, was that the other vessel was travelling at a greater speed than I (First Officer Webb) had calculated; and it (the collision) may well have been avoided by the Monarch starboarding half a point.

— Mr. Thomas Webb. The Isle of Man Times. Tuesday, 19 September 1899.

As would be expected, during the course of his deposition, Capt. McCullough made a different assertion:-

I could not understand why the other vessel continued on its course, as my red light was exposed to its green light, and both lights burning brightly. I consider that, according to rules preventing collision at sea, the other vessel should have given me way. In my opinion, the cause of the casualty was negligence on the part of those in charge of the Peveril, and it may of been avoided by the Peveril's helm being positioned so as to get round the stern of my vessel

— Capt. Alexander McCullough. The Isle of Man Times. Tuesday, 19 September 1899.

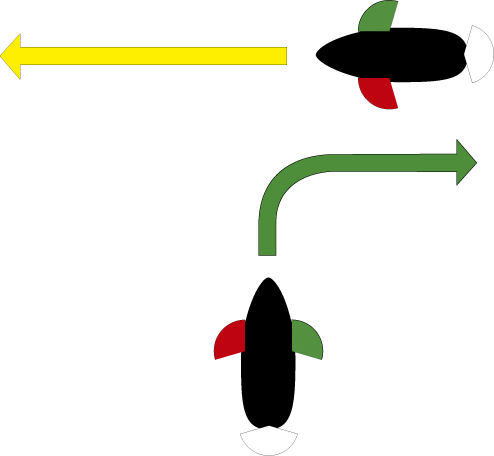
Illustration of how vessels should avoid each other when a risk of collision exists.

From the International Regulations for Preventing Collisions at Sea, it would appear that the crew of the Peveril were to blame. International Regulations for Preventing Collisions at Sea; Part B – Steering and sailing; Section II (for vessels in sight of one another); Article 15. Crossing situations stating:-

"When two power-driven vessels are crossing so as to involve risk of collision, the vessel which has the other on her starboard side shall keep out of the way and shall, if the circumstances of the case admit, avoid crossing ahead of the other vessel."
