= Douglas Bay =

Douglas Bay may refer to the following locations:

- Douglas Harbour, located in Douglas Bay, Isle of Man
- Douglas Bay (Dominica)
- Douglas Bay, Queens, a part of the Douglaston neighborhood in the Queens borough of New York City, New York, United States
