= SS Snaefell (1876) =

Historical paddle steamer on the Isle of Man

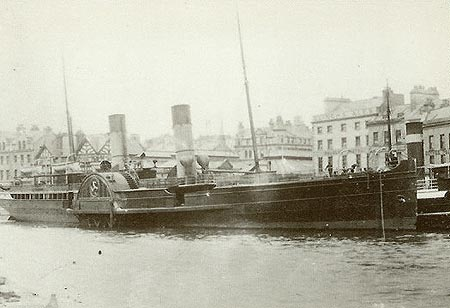
- Snaefell at the Coffee Palace berth, Douglas, Isle of Man

History
- Name: Snaefell
- Owner: 1876–1904: IOMSPCo.
- Operator: 1876–1904: IOMSPCo.
- Port of registry: Douglas, Isle of Man
- Builder: Caird & Co. Greenock
- Cost: £28,250
- Way number: 67289
- Launched: 27 April 1876
- Completed: 1876
- In service: 1876
- Out of service: 1904
- Identification: Official Number 67289; Code Letters Q W S P
- Fate: Scrapped 1905

General characteristics
- Type: Paddle Steamer
- Tonnage: 849 gross register tons (GRT)
- Length: 251 ft 3 in (76.6 m)
- Beam: 29 ft 3 in (8.9 m)
- Depth: 14 ft 1 in (4.3 m)
- Installed power: 1,700 shp (1,300 kW)
- Propulsion: Two oscillating diagonally opposed engines, developing 1,700 shp (1,300 kW)
- Speed: 15 knots (28 km/h; 17 mph)

SS (RMS) Snaefell (II) No. 67289 – the second vessel in the line's history to be so named – was an iron paddle steamer which was owned and operated by the Isle of Man Steam Packet Company.

== Construction & dimensions ==
Snaefell was built at the yards of Cairn & Co., Glasgow, in 1876. Her builders also supplied her engines and boilers and she was launched on Thursday 27 April 1876.

Her purchase cost was £28,250; she had a registered tonnage of 849 GRT; length 251'3"; beam 29'3"; depth 14'1". Snaefell's engines developed 1,700 shp (1,300 kW) and gave her a service speed of 15 knots (28 km/h; 17 mph).

In 1885, Snaefell received new boilers at a cost of £8,512 (equivalent to £945,686 in 2025). They were produced by Fawcett, Preston & Company of Liverpool and installed by Jones & Sons Ltd.

In 1895, she was fitted with electric lighting. The cost of the installation was £425 (equivalent to £48,316 in 2025).

== Service life ==
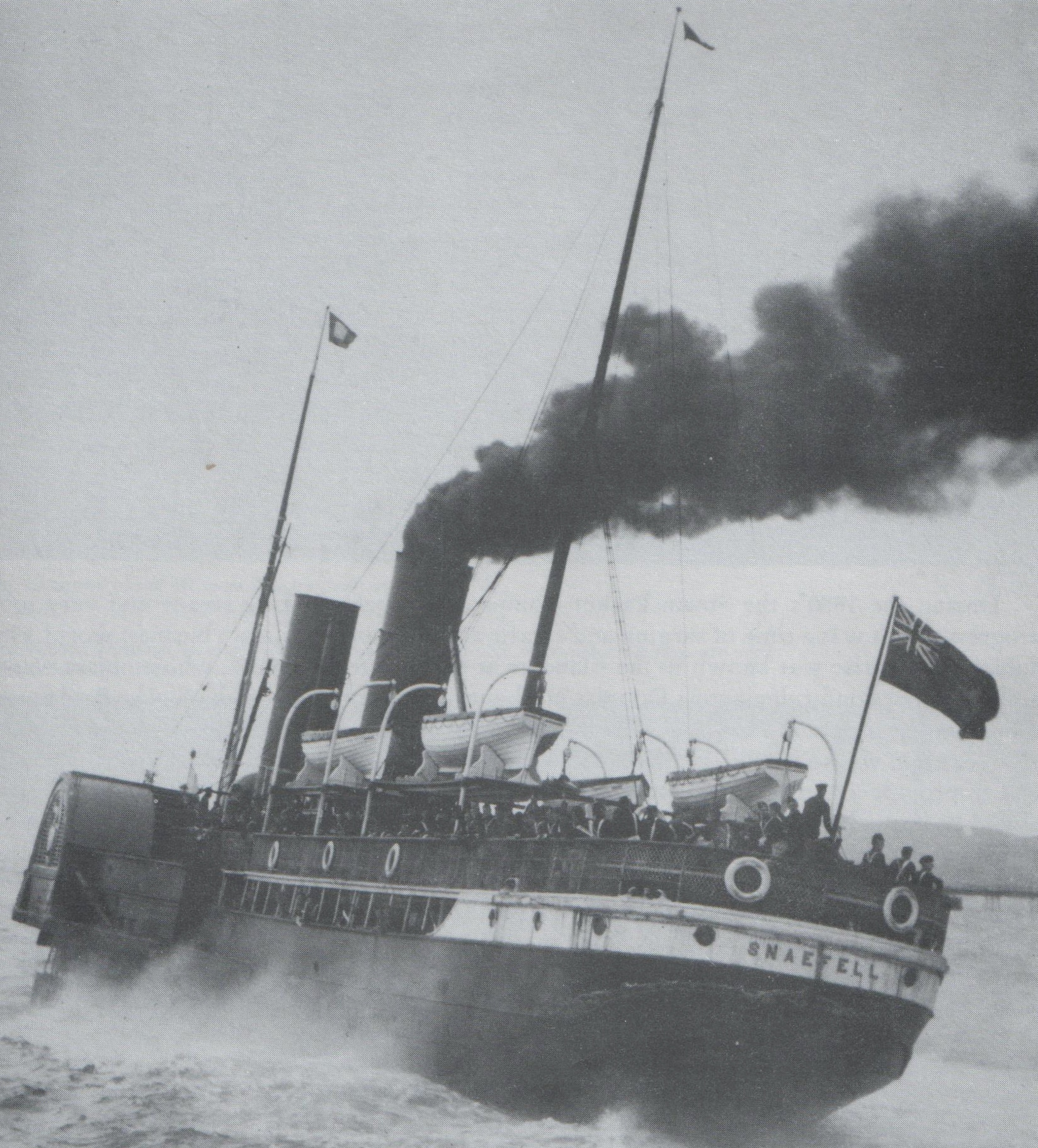
Snaefell pictured departing Ramsey, with troops embarked.

A smaller vessel then her immediate predecessors, but judged successful none-the-less, Snaefell served the many ports to which the Company then operated.

On 13 September 1876, Snaefell collided with the barque Lily of Devon, which was anchored in the River Mersey. The barque sustained moderate damage, Snaefell only had one of her boats damaged. In April 1881, she was involved in a collision with the Osprey off Douglas Head. In December 1888, Snaefell collided with the steamship Maranhense and was severely damaged. She was taken in to Liverpool.

In August 1892, she was making passage to Ardrossan from Douglas in hazy weather, when she collided with the Norwegian vessel Kaleb. Both ships were damaged, but the Snaefell was able to continue to the yards of Fairfield & Co. under her own steam for repairs. The subsequent repairs cost £1,298 (equivalent to £142,588 in 2025). A legal wrangle then ensued, and finally the High Court in Edinburgh held that both ships were to blame.

The Royal Netherlands Steamship Company, who had bought Snaefell (I) and had successfully operated her for 13 years, sometimes chartered Snaefell (II).

== Disposal ==
Snaefell was scrapped in 1905.
