= SS Ben-my-Chree (1875) =

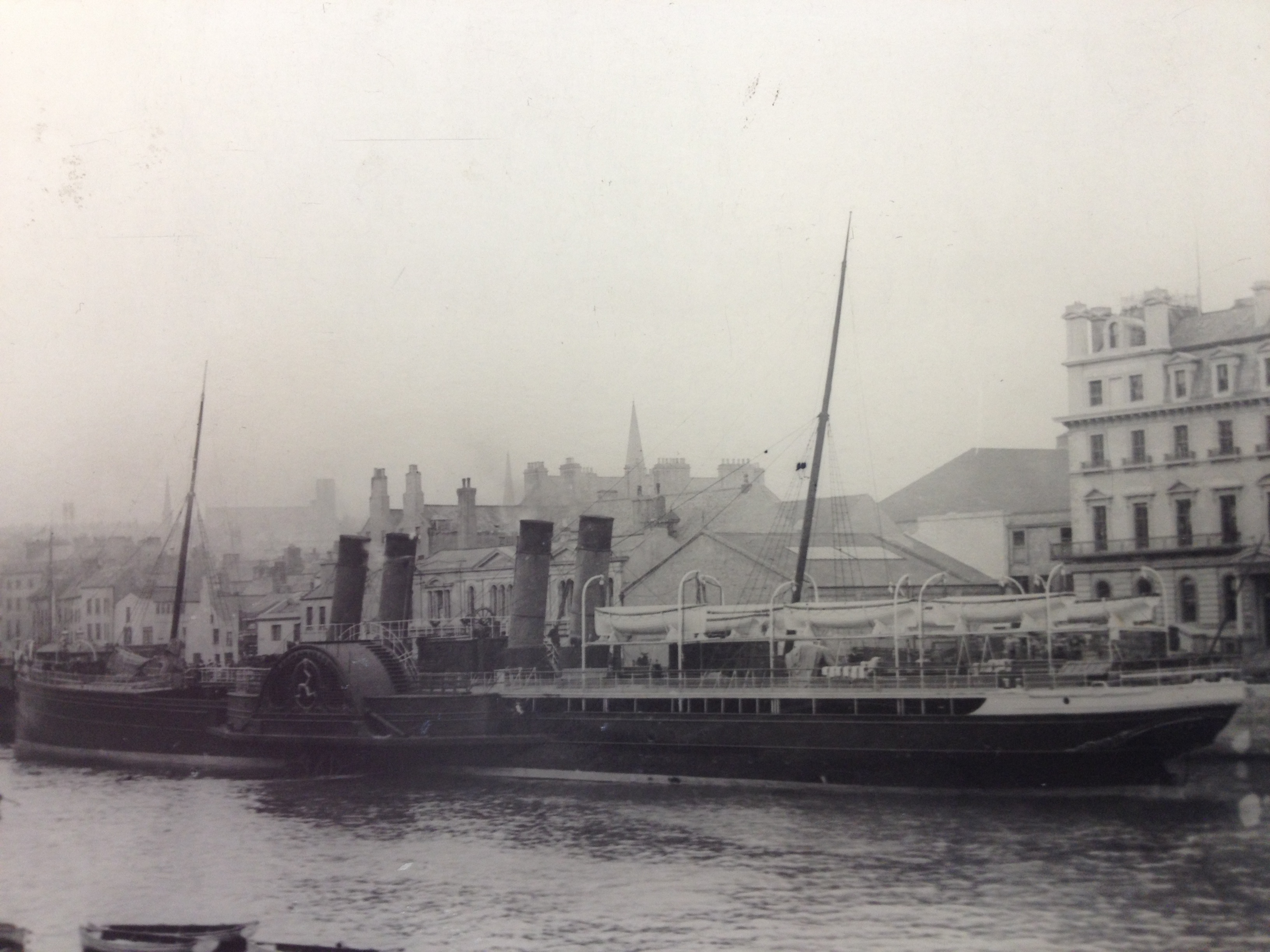
- Ben-my-Chree after refit, berthed alongside the Imperial Hotel, Douglas

History

Isle of Man
- Owner: Isle of Man Steam Packet Company
- Port of registry: Douglas
- Builder: Barrow Shipbuilding Company
- Cost: £38,000
- Launched: 6 May 1875
- In service: 1875–1906
- Identification: No. 67288
- Fate: Scrapped in 1906

General characteristics
- Type: Packet steamer
- Tonnage: 1,020–1,192 GRT
- Length: 310 ft (94 m)
- Beam: 31 ft (9.4 m)
- Depth: 13 ft (4.0 m)
- Installed power: 2,300 shp (1,700 kW)
- Propulsion: Paddle wheels
- Speed: 14 knots (26 km/h; 16 mph)

SS Ben-my-Chree was an iron paddle-steamer of the Isle of Man Steam Packet Company and was the second vessel of the company to bear the name.

== Description ==
Ben-my-Chree was built by the Barrow Shipbuilding Company and launched at Barrow-in-Furness on 6 May 1875.

She had an original tonnage of 1,030 GRT, but this was increased to 1,192 GRT after a refit. She had a length of 310 feet 9 inches (94.72 m), beam-length of 31 feet 9 inches (9.68 m), and a depth of 13 feet 9 inches (4.19 m).

With a top speed of 14 knots (26 km/h; 16 mph) at 2,300 shaft horsepower (1,700 kW), and fitted with two oscillating two-cylinder engines with a 65-inch (170 cm) diameter and 90-inch (230 cm) stroke. It was subsequently found that she operated two knots below her recorded top speed, despite modifications to her boilers. Reboilered in 1884, she was altered to carry four funnels, in pairs fore and aft of the paddle-boxes. This made her the only four-funnelled vessel in line's history.

After an uneventful 31-year career, Ben-my-Chree was sold for scrap and broken up at Morecambe, in 1906.

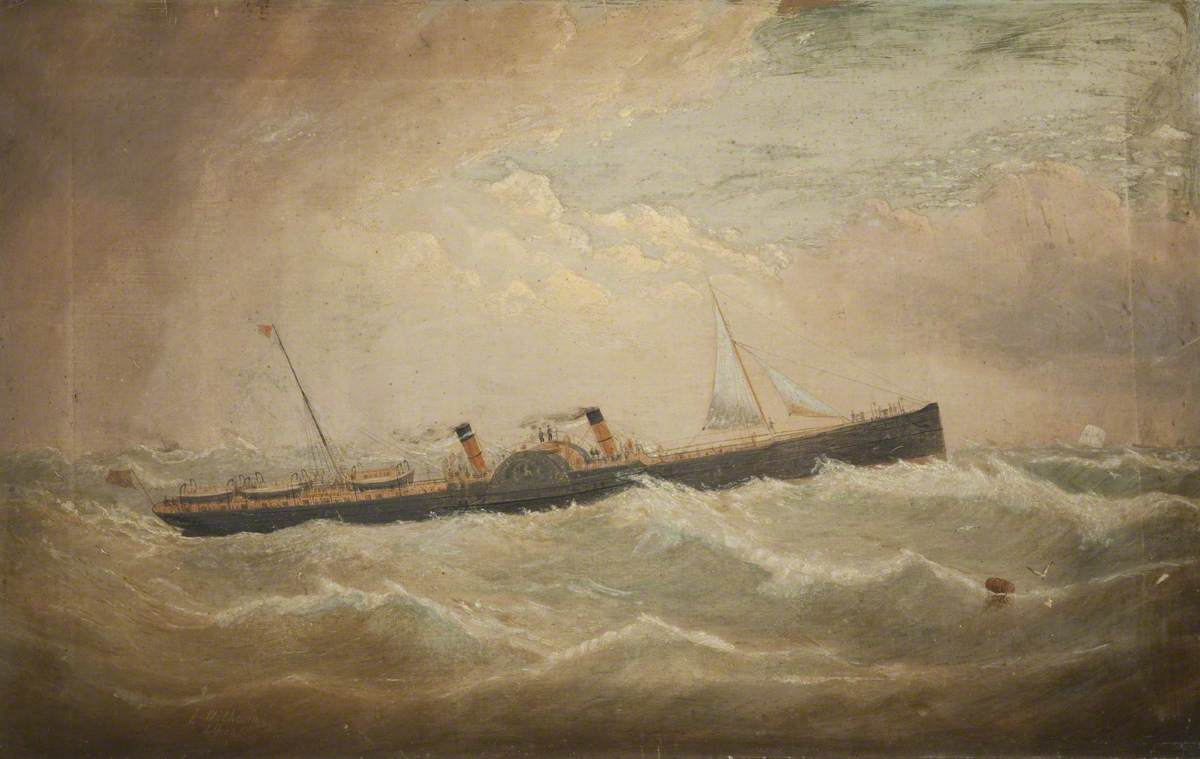
Ben-My-Chree, before refit, by Joseph Witham

== Bibliography ==
- Chappell, C. (1980). Island Lifeline. T.Stephenson & Sons. ISBN 090131420X.
