= Douglas Harbour =

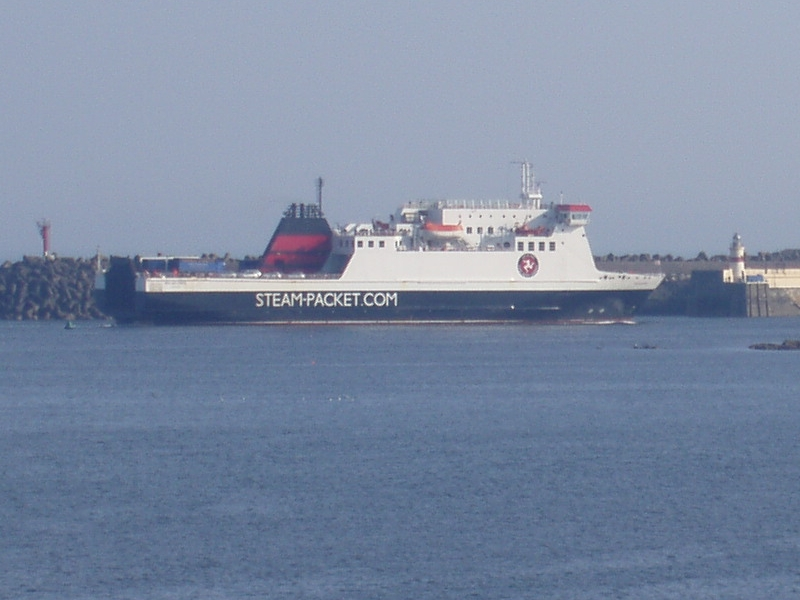
- Interactive map of Douglas Harbour

Location
- Location: Douglas, Isle of Man
- Coordinates: 54°8′48.2″N 4°28′2.5″W

Details
- Opened: 1660
- Operated by: Isle of Man Government
- Owned by: Isle of Man
- Type of Harbor: Natural/Artificial
- No. of berths: 16
- No. of piers: 4
- Port Pilot: Douglas Pilots
- Port Manager: Michael MacDonald

Statistics
- Passenger traffic: 635,269 (2008)
- Website; IoM Gov't Harbours Division

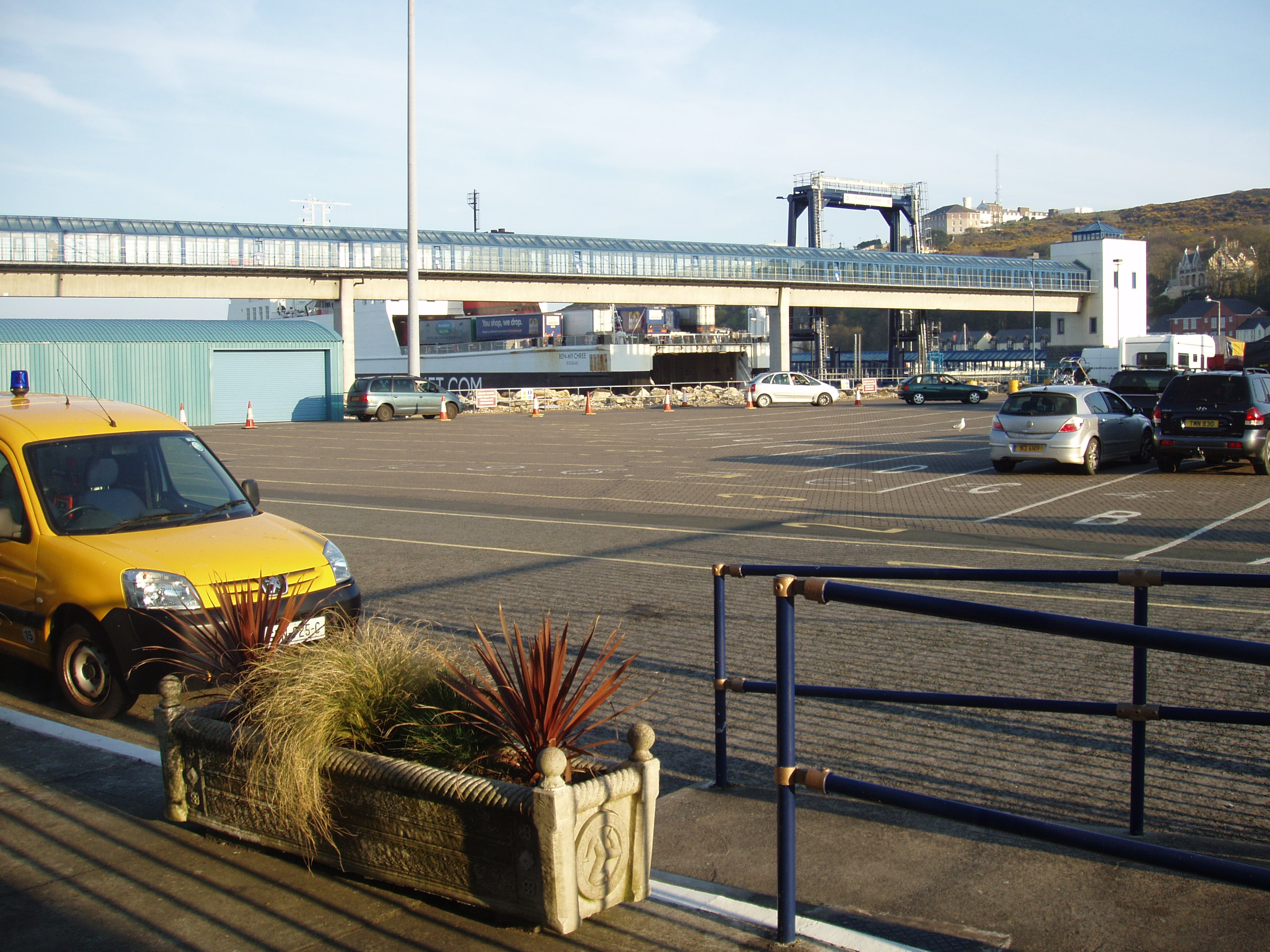
Vehicle assembly area and passenger bridge near Edward Pier.

Douglas Harbour (Manx: Purt Varrey Ghoolish) is located near Douglas Head at the southern end of Douglas, the capital of the Isle of Man. It is the island's main commercial shipping port. The Port of Douglas was the first in the world to be equipped with radar.

== Description ==
Douglas Harbour is composed of the Outer Harbour and the Inner Harbour separated by the Bascule Bridge and Flapgate. There is a sea terminal building at the north-east end of the harbour, co-located with the harbour control.

The Outer Harbour features two jetties, four piers, eleven berths, and an area designated for lifeboats. The piers are:

- Princess Alexandra Pier
- Battery Pier
- King Edward VIII Pier
- Victoria Pier

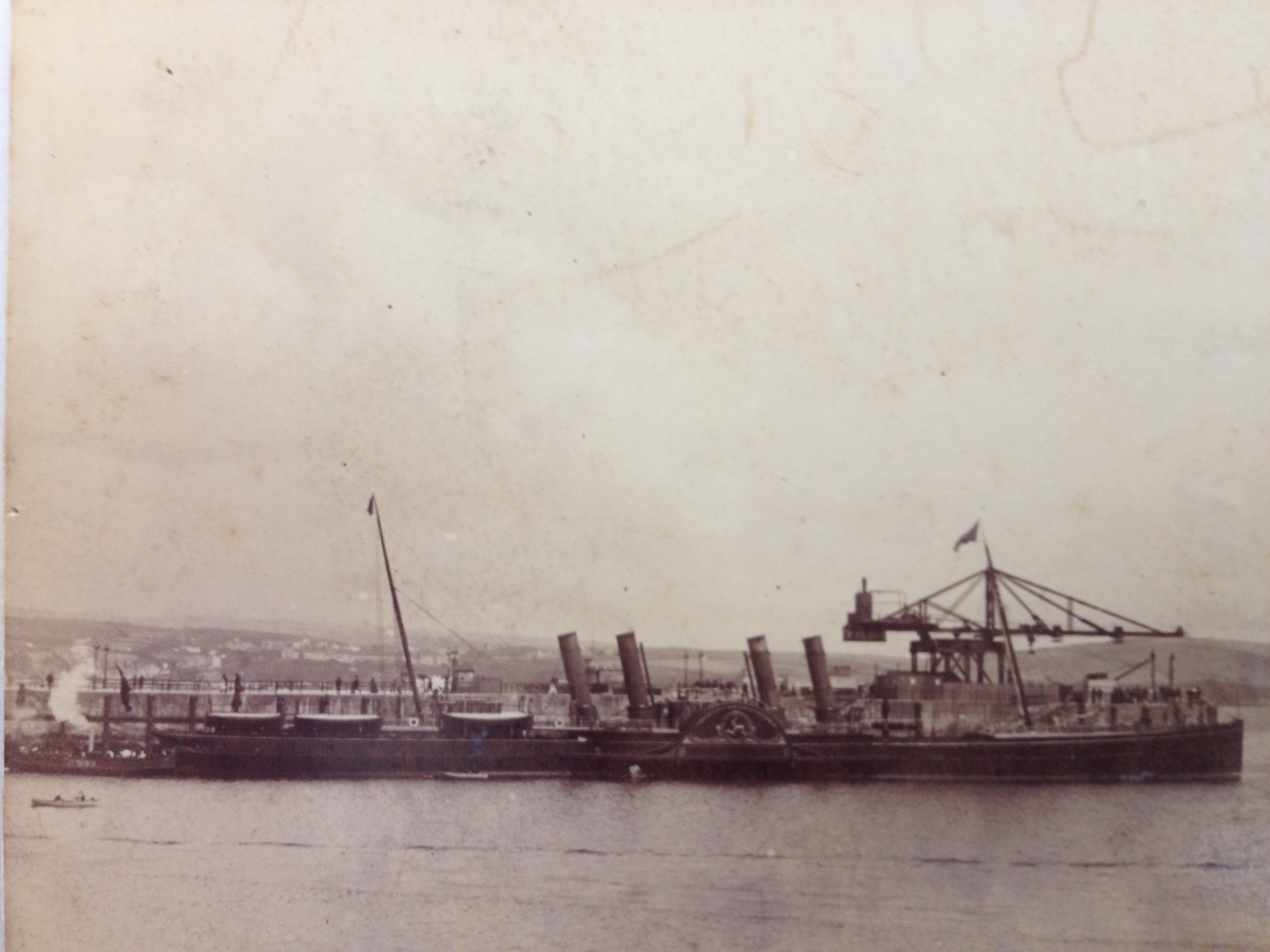
Victoria Pier under construction, with Isle of Man Steam Packet Company vessel Ben-my-Chree berthed alongside.

The two jetties are:

- Fort Anne Jetty
- Oil Jetty

The Inner Harbour allows access and berthing of small vessels.

== Traffic ==
By tonnage, the port's primary traffic is from the Isle of Man Steam Packet Company fleet.

In the vicinity of the Sea Terminal are the following stations/stops which facilitate passenger transport connections:

- Bus Vannin - Lord Street (A1) Depot (Stands A - E) near Parade Street (A11), serves most bus routes
- Bus Vannin - Loch Promenade Stop (Stands F, G) near Regent Street, serves Ramsey and intra-Douglas routes
- Isle of Man Steam Railway - Douglas Railway Station on Bank Hill near Lord (A1) and Athol (A22) Streets.
- Douglas Bay Horse Tramway - Loch Promenade near Victoria Pier

By connecting with the appropriate bus or tramway, sea passengers may also transfer to the Manx Electric Railway to points north.

== History ==
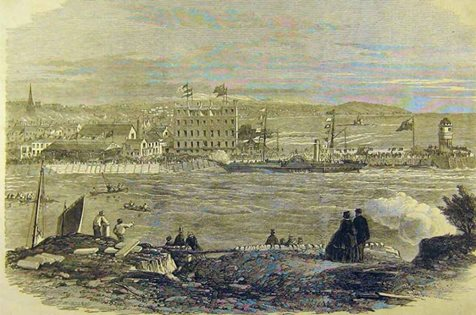
Sketch depiction of Douglas Harbour, circa 1861.

The earliest record of infrastructure for the use of Douglas Harbour dates back to 1660. From about 1800, many things happened to open up the island to more traffic. In 1760 construction of what amounted to a pier was begun, however it was wrecked in a severe storm before work was completed. Then the sides of the small Douglas River basin were shored up, and there was another try to extend some sort of protective structure out to sea; but this again failed. In 1787 the pier was reduced to rubble following a series of winter storms, and so for many years Douglas Harbour was fully exposed to easterly gales, whilst in the bay the perilous Conister Rock claimed many victims.

By 1815 sail was giving way to steam. The first steamer called at the island on its voyage from the Clyde to Liverpool, and in 1819 James Little opened the first steamship service to the island, with Douglas as a port of call between Liverpool and Greenock. A year later this service was augmented, with three ships appearing on the station - these being the Robert Bruce, the Superb and the Majestic.. With the sailings of these vessels augmented by the arrival of the City of Glasgow, the full journey from the Mersey to the Clyde via Douglas could be made in 25 hours.

By 1833 passenger traffic had undergone a remarkable process of progressive development, and due to the imposition of the Passenger Tax accurate passenger records became available. In the 1830s arrivals at Douglas were under 100,000 but increased steadily throughout the century, peaking at over 650,000 by 1913.

== Red Pier ==
Work on the Red Pier commenced in 1793 and was completed in 1801, the foundation stone being laid by John Murray, 4th Duke of Atholl, following his appointment as Governor General of the Isle of Man.

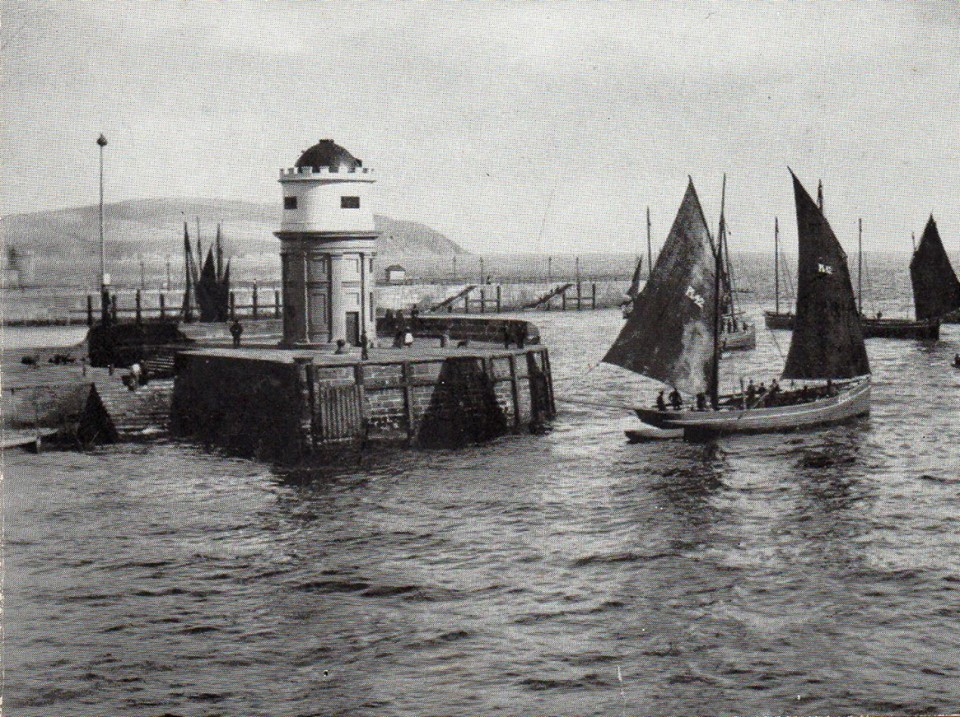
The ornate Georgian era lighthouse at the end of the Red Pier.

=== Construction ===
The Red Pier was designed by George Steuart, a Scotsman who had long been under the patronage of the Dukes of Atholl, and who carried out a number of important commissions in the Island. The Red Pier, paid for by the British Treasury, cost £25,000 (equivalent to £1,620,000 in 2025). The pier was 530 ft (162 m) long, and was driven out to the limit of low water, extending more than 50 yards beyond the end of the old wrecked pier which had preceded it. The pier and its associated public buildings were constructed with stone imported from the Isle of Arran off the west coast of Scotland. The stone was a distinct reddish colour, and this gave rise to the pier's name. In its offices passenger arrivals and departures could be logged, and there could be checks for smuggled goods which in the early 19th century were commonplace between the Isle of Man and the United Kingdom. In addition to the construction of the pier there were also a courthouse and a temporary gaol.

=== Opening ceremony ===
The Red Pier was officially opened in 1801. The opening ceremony was led by the Duke of Atholl, who had laid the foundation stone in 1793. The construction was the first public works scheme to be carried out on the Isle of Man in many years, and the ceremony was said to have been an occasion for immense civic pride. Contemporary reports state that almost every inhabitant of the town attended; many took the opportunity to walk on the pier, which was then the nearest thing to a promenade in the town.

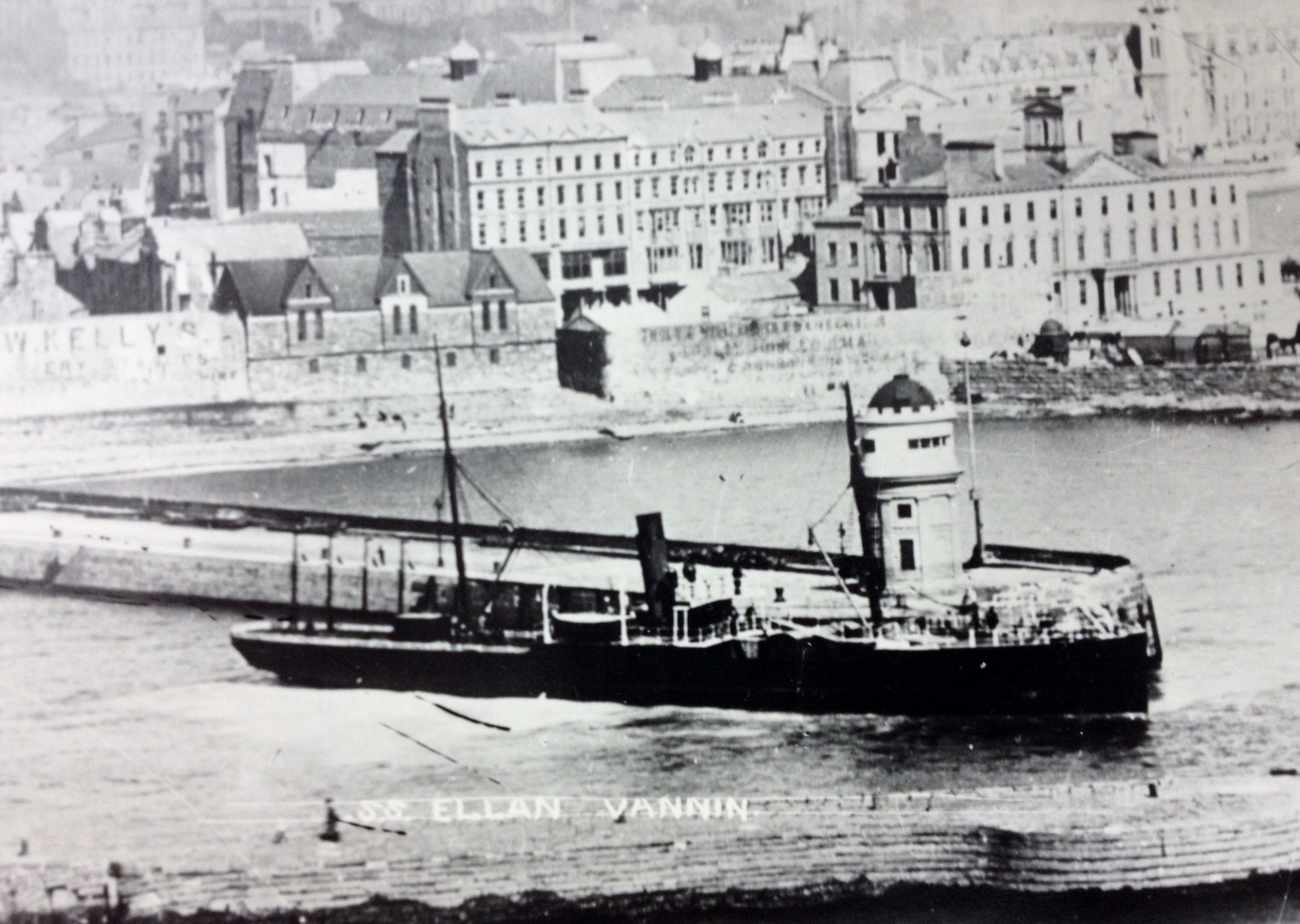
RMS Ellan Vannin pictured passing the Red Pier, Douglas. The original Breakwater, which today is known as the Fort Anne Jetty, can be seen in the near ground

.

The Red Pier allowed passengers to disembark from a steamer more readily at high tide, but until 1871, passengers sometimes had to board rowing boats in order to be ferried to any vessel lying off. The reverse applied when they were disembarking. The scene could be chaotic, and quite often in winter, passengers would reach the Red Pier from the vessel soaking wet and exhausted.

Owing to its openness to swell generated by easterly winds, there were many shipwrecks in Douglas Bay and the surrounding area. This culminated in the heroic rescue of the crew of the SS St. George by Sir William Hillary and the crew of the Douglas lifeboat on 20 November 1830.

== Douglas Breakwater ==
=== Origins ===
Sir William Hillary had campaigned for the construction of a Breakwater at Douglas so as to afford the harbour greater shelter and to provide a sheltered haven to ships plying in the Irish Sea. Sir William had written a comprehensive paper on the proposal prior to 1835, when more formal proposals were put forward, and design plans drawn up by Sir John Rennie.

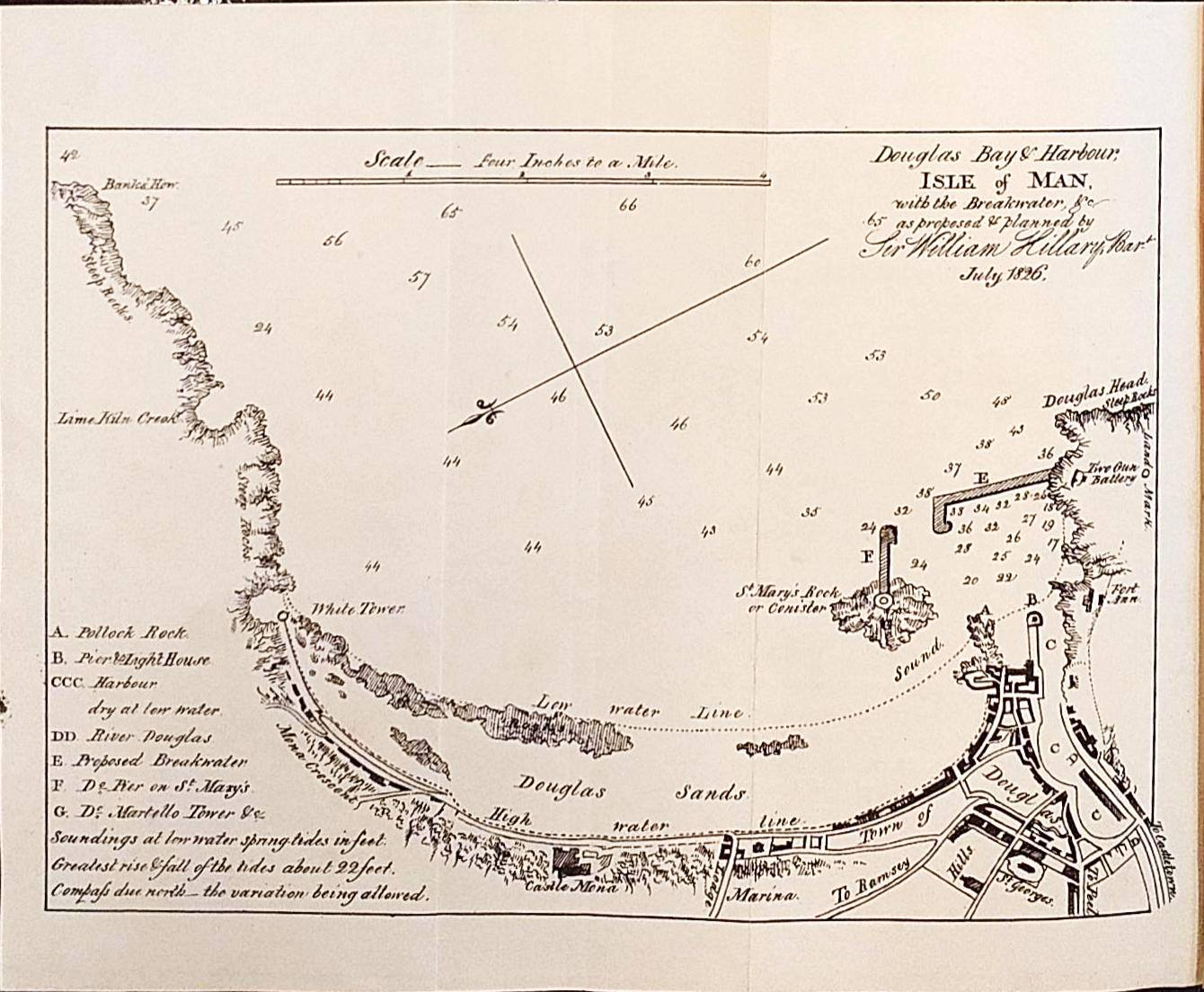
Plan for Douglas Harbour as envisaged by Sir William Hillary (1826).

However, due to bickering no plans were proceeded with and despite campaigning by the Island's press progress in any direction was slow. Much of this was to do with rival proposals for the construction of breakwaters at Peel and Ramsey both of which, as was the case with Douglas, would ultimately rely on approval and funding from the Admiralty. Plans for the Douglas Breakwater were amended by Capt. Vetch but again these were subject to differing opinions and despite the requisite monies being available from 1851 and a further report submitted in 1859, it was not until 1861 that a further set of plans submitted by James Abernethy were approved by the Lords Commissioners of the Admiralty.

=== Battery Breakwater ===
The design incorporated landing berths with three platforms at different levels, adapted for loading and unloading at all stages of the considerable tidal range in Douglas with steps for the accommodation of passengers. The rubble stone for the construction was to be procured near the site and the design lent heavily of the Abernethy's previous designs at Blyth, Northumberland, the breakwater at Falmouth, and the piers at Watchet, Bristol Channel and Port Natal, South Africa.

Two breakwaters were initially to be constructed, a southern one and a northern breakwater. The costs submitted were £54,000 (equivalent to £5,676,900 in 2025) for the southern breakwater and £28,500 (equivalent to £2,996,100 in 2025) for the northern breakwater. The estimated time for construction for both structures was two years. This was later amended to construction of the southern breakwater only with the successful tender for the work received from Thomas Jackson of London and a final cost of £47,935 (equivalent to £5,039,300 in 2025) agreed.

Work began in earnest in August 1862, when the brig Thomas Black arrived from London with machinery and a cargo of timber. Work was also cleared to proceed for the breakwaters at Peel and Ramsey with the contract also carried out by Thomas Jackson and with James Abernethy providing the services of a resident engineer and assuming the role of engineer-in-chief himself.

Whilst work slowed during the winter of 1862-63 the schedule was maintained, however an un-seasonal bout of easterly storms in mid-May 1863 caused slight damage to the work on the breakwater, but this was quickly put right with little or no disruption to the time scale.

Concerns were expressed by Abernethy as construction continued that the length as initially proposed could affect vessels departing the port during periods of strong southeasterly wind, with particular concern being the chances of a sailing vessel drifting onto the Pollock Rock or St Mary's Isle. Consequently, the drawings were amended and the construction shortened by 250 ft (76.2 m). During May 1864, serious damage was sustained to the breakwater after supporting timber frames gave way as a consequence of the weight of stone placed on them. This was attributed in a report commissioned by the Harbour Commissioners to non-compliance with certain terms of the specification relative to the stone filling and particularly from neglect to form a homogeneous rubble mound to the level of 15 ft (4.6 m) below low water as the true base of the breakwater, hence the failure of the frames which were placed lower than 15 feet. The quality of the stone being used was also brought into question, with a request for sourcing a better quality in order to furnish the seaward face of the breakwater. In a letter to the Commissioners of the Isle of Man Harbours, Abernethy put forward a recalculated structure of a length of 700 ft (213.4 m) and with a revised cost of completion being £33,705 (£2,891,548 in 2014), (£13,116) less than the original contract sum. In addition a cost was submitted for the improving the roadway to the breakwater. This was submitted at £850 (£72,921 in 2014).

The breakwater sustained significant damage in early February 1865, when a storm described as "unequalled in its fury and unexampled in its effects" pounded the structure washing away many of the timber frames which ended up strewn on Douglas shore. This destruction led to serious questions being raised as to the design of the structure and of Abernethy's reputation. It was not until 7 March, that divers were able to inspect the base of the structure with their findings being that damage had been sustained as far as the 45th frame. The timber uprights had been snapped off however the rubble had not been displaced.

The breakwater was after this not continued with, as it was generally accepted that the calculations and more importantly the method of construction were wrong and that no benefit could be ultimately expected with its continuation. An easterly storm with associated snow on the night of Saturday 5 January 1867, swept away the remaining portion of the breakwater leaving the structure completely demolished.

- Labourer Patrick MacAlinden was killed in the quarry adjoining the Douglas Breakwater on 1 January 1864.

=== Battery Pier ===
After Abernethy's breakwater was destroyed, Governor Henry Loch commissioned more plans on behalf of the Isle of Man Government for a larger and more modern structure. Distinguished civil engineer John Coode was appointed to survey the area of Abernethy's breakwater and to submit his recommendations.

==== Surveys and charts ====
On 7 and 8 March 1867, Coode inspected the shores around Douglas, and gave directions for an accurate and detailed survey of the southern portions of Douglas Bay, together with tidal observations and a complete series of soundings, in order to prepare drawings and estimates for the new breakwater.

A particular concern was the port's exposure to easterly winds. The shore was inspected again in April. A report was placed before Tynwald on 10 June 1867; it detailed certain differences between Coode's findings in the vicinity of the Pollock Rocks and those of an Admiralty inspection of the same area in 1846. The comparison also encompassed the area around St Mary's Isle (Conister Rock).

Coode produced a detailed chart of the bay from Douglas Head to Bank's Howe; the Conister Rock area was surveyed in particular detail. The survey highlighted a difference in the depth of water near the ruined breakwater and also to the southeast of Conister Rock: the depth was measured to be some 6 ft (1.8 m) to 9 ft (2.7 m) deeper than shown on the 1846 Admiralty chart.

==== Functionality required ====
Coode submitted a detailed and comprehensive plan for the type of structure required, with emphasis on whether it would provide adequate shelter for the harbour and enable the regular and safe landing of passengers and mail, at all states of the tide and weather: steamers had to be able to come alongside during offshore winds. Adequate shelter for the fishing fleet was also a high priority. In the mid-19th century, fishing was an important part of the island's economy; the value of the boats and fishing gear of the Manx fleet had risen sharply from £52,380 (equivalent to £5,627,600 in 2025) in 1858 to £63,482 in 1865 (equivalent to £6,896,100 in 2025). Provision also had to be made for the "insular trade" and also for trading vessels using that part of the Irish Sea. It was proposed that if the Manx Exchequer paid for the building work, then such vessels could be made to pay a "refuge toll" if they were not trading directly with the island, but just using the port facilities for shelter.

==== Recommendations ====
Coode recommended the following works:

- A western arm starting under the Battery Point, just within Abernethy's old timber framed breakwater. The arm was to be constructed in a direction of east-by-north for a distance of 250 ft (76 m); having a short kant or elbow within its inner end. This arm could use the remains of Abernethy's breakwater; but the rubble mound which was the only remnants of the structure, and was only visible at low water, had to be removed. This task was undertaken by workmen and divers down to a depth of 24 ft (7.3 m) below the low water mark on spring tides.
- A central breakwater, 300 ft eastward of this western arm. This would consist of three lengths:

One running ENE for 300 ft (91 m);
One running NE for 400 ft (122 m);
One running NNE for 500 ft (152 m);

making a total length of 1,200 ft (366 m).

- A northern arm starting at a distance of 300 ft (91 m) from the northeast end of the central breakwater and running north-by-west for 400 ft (122 m) with a kant of 60 ft (18 m) bearing west-by-north. The northern end of this arm was placed so as to protect the anchorage from easterly wind as would be situated seaward of a line drawn to Bank's Howe Point.

The areas of the different depths of water sheltered within the proposed work were to be:

Depth at low water (fathoms)	Area	
Depth at low water (fathoms)	Acres	Hectares
2+	42	17
3+	31	12.5
4+	19	8
5+	12	5

There was to be a small lighthouse tower on the southeast end of the outer end of the landing pier, containing a powerful condensing apparatus so as to show a coloured light only in the lines of the entrances to the harbour. This enabled an accurate approach to be made at night for the first time.

As had been found when the earlier breakwater was built, the stone available from the adjacent quarry was not good enough to be used as the main facing stone. However, the quarry was again used, as this stone could still be used as foundation rubble stone. This base was laid to a depth of 15 ft (4.6 m) below low water on the sea face and 12 ft (3.7 m) below low water on the harbour face. Above this base work were to be laid massive concrete blocks, made with Portland cement and built so as to allow the free escape of water and air during heavy seas. This principle had been successfully used on several structures in the Mediterranean; it was the only safe, efficient, and reasonably economic form of construction for places such as Douglas, where there is deep water and a considerable tidal range, but no large material nearby.

The building work could not be allowed to hinder sea traffic to/from the port, as the island was enjoying the beginnings of a tourism boom and Douglas was the main port of the Isle of Man Steam Packet Company. To avoid a clash, materials were conveyed by barges specially adapted for the purpose and towed by steam tugs.

==== Cost and construction time ====
It was proposed that building work would take seven years, with the costs detailed as:

Item	Cost
Central Breakwater; including the removal of rubble from the former Battery Breakwater	£129,280
Permanent installation of concrete blocks	£6,480
Lighthouse Tower; including all forms of lighting, foundations and Landing Pier	£1,400
Contingencies	£17,145
Total	£154,305 (equivalent to £14,936,800 in 2025)

Coode proposed that the rocks on the shore between the Battery Breakwater and the Fort Anne Jetty, as well as on the south face of Conister Rock, should be excavated down to a flat slope, so as to form "beaching grounds" for vessels including fishing boats.

It was generally accepted that easterly winds were quite dangerous in the port, especially in the entrance between the Red Pier and the Fort Anne Jetty. So Coode recommended that once the new western arm was finished, the eastern end of the Fort Anne Jetty was to be removed. Visiting steamers were increasing in size, and at that time still had to proceed to anchorage in Douglas Bay after disembarking their passengers.

A committee, presided over by the island's Lieutenant Governor, was formed to examine the plans submitted by Coode and to report their recommendations. The committee first sat on 12 June 1867, and reported its findings in November. They recommended that the plans be adopted except that the north arm should be dispensed with. They further recommended that £140,000 (equivalent to £13,552,000 in 2025) was to be borrowed from the Public Works Loans Commissioners, upon the security of the island's revenue, under the Harbours and Passing Tolls Act, 1861. The loan was to be repaid over 50 years. The committee also recommended that the works be carried out as soon as the consent of the Board of Trade could be obtained.

The proposals were warmly received by local fishermen, as was evident in a letter of late November to the Isle of Man Times.

==== Opposition to the scheme ====
Despite the committee's favourable reporting, there was some opposition to the scheme. At a public meeting at St Johns on Tuesday 26 November 1867, it was moved that further engineering evidence should be sought in order to verify Coode's report. This did ultimately lead to a further examination of the calculations and costs, was which undertaken by John Hawkshaw.

Concern had been expressed that the harbour, and in particular the landing pier extending from the Pollock Rocks (later to become the Victoria Pier) would still be very open in strong SE winds. Coode undertook to amend his design in early 1868, and this was then subjected to inspection by Hawkshaw.

There was also some difference of opinion on whether the southern end of the breakwater should begin at a point to the east or the west of Port Skillion. Hawkshaw's report was completed on 24 February 1868 and laid before Tynwald on 4 March. Hawkshaw largely agreed with Coode's earlier calculations, and fully agreed with Coode's method of construction. One small difference of opinion was that Hawkshaw recommended a slight amendment of the line of the breakwater at the northeast end. In a letter to Tynwald, Coode cited his work on a similar structure at Alderney as well as emphasising Hawkshaw's agreement with the costings and calculations, and reaffirming that the materials recommended would be adequate to withstand the frequent winter storms.

Nevertheless, there was still strong opposition to the construction. Just as had been the case since Sir William Hillary's initial proposal, various suggestions continued to be made, resulting in plenty of argument. This culminated in a petition signed by 182 people: 25 ship owners, 51 master mariners, 10 pilots and 96 other mariners.

A music hall song was even devised, sung to the tune of Sweet Kitty Clover and entitled The Breakwater Dilemma.

One of the most vocal critics of the proposal was Rev W. B. Christian. He felt that an enormous outlay was to be made without satisfactory assurance that the plan was the best available. Governor Loch worked tirelessly to convince those who still questioned the proposal; he met Rev Christian and put the engineering facts to him in what was described as an affective and conciliatory manner. Christian's concern was reasonable: Coode was also working on building a breakwater at Port Erin, and Coode himself admitted that the methods used were shown to be failing in their practicality and application.

The Port Erin Breakwater was to be dogged by allegations of shoddy construction and design, and it was damaged by gales more than once. Governor Loch persuaded a reluctant Tynwald to grant £13,000 for necessary repairs as a result of damage sustained in 1868, with the repairs to be completed by 1870. However the breakwater was again damaged in 1882 and was finally destroyed in 1884, after having cost the island a total of £45,600.

Part of the allegations levelled at the breakwater at Port Erin centred around the rubble base of the structure, which Coode had constructed at 15 feet (4.6 m) and which was the same as he intended to carry out at Douglas. The local press published many accusations about Coode's reputation, and it was even said Coode had misled Tynwald.

==== Construction starts; some minor setbacks ====
Despite these setbacks, work was cleared to proceed, starting with the re-opening of the nearby quarry, and work on a road beneath the old two-gun battery connecting to the South Quay. Work also started on arm "B" of the main structure.

As work proceeded, the only setback was an accident in December 1872. The foreman, named Johnson, who lived locally at Fort William Rd, Douglas, was carrying out his duties on the edge of the large gantry which had been constructed, when he missed his foothold and fell onto the rocks some 30 feet below. He sustained injuries to his ribs, but he survived. There was another accident in September 1873, when Henry Holden, a labourer, of South Quay, ran into a winch and was knocked unconscious. He was taken home and treated by a doctor.

On New Year's Eve 1874 the Battery Pier sustained damage during a south-easterly gale which continued into New Year's Day. Afterwards, John Coode visited the island and inspected the damage on 5 January.

The Harbour Commissioners had made a preliminary inspection; they found that the heavy seas had damaged and disturbed the concrete blocks under the low water mark, thus taking away the support of the upper concrete work on the outer sea wall, and causing it to slip off. Three of the uprights which supported the framing were carried away, and two of the cross-timbers of the staging had been broken.

Coode found that a portion of the wall just above low water mark, about 16 ft 2 in (4.9 m) long, had become detached and had been carried inwards. Also a portion of the adjoining blocks for a depth of two courses had become displaced, but were not damaged. However below this and down to the foundation course remained undisturbed. In addition, three piles of the tramway staging were broken off.

The repairs were calculated to cost £600, but provision had been made for such repairs in the original costings.

==== Completion ====
Workings on the breakwater continued sporadically through 1876, 1877 & 1878 with work at times appearing to be at a standstill. Part of the reason for this was the construction of the Victoria Pier the foundations of which required rectifying and thereby accounting for the majority of the labour force. By the beginning of 1879 only 120 blocks were required to complete the breakwater, along with approximately 70 yards of parapet walling.

Despite the delays work was concluded at the end of July, 1879, the construction of a small lighthouse on the seaward end of the structure being the final part of the work.

The total expenditure on the Battery Pier and approaches was as follows:-

Item	Cost
Materials	£31,187 4s 11d
Labour	£46,802 15s 10d
Plant and Implements	£9,925 14s 9d
Buildings	£350 10s 6d
Freight, Insurance and miscellaneous	£6133 10s 0d
Payments on account of engineering, rents and royalties	£11,374 11s 2d
Total	£105,774 8s 2d (equivalent to £10,239,000 in 2025)

The official opening of the Battery Pier took place on Friday 29 August 1879.

== King Edward VIII Pier ==
=== Construction ===
The need for increased passenger facilities had been identified as early as 1904, however such works were continually postponed due to the ongoing costs of various schemes for harbour protection.

In early 1930 it was decided that further improvement works were required in the port, and it was decided to extend the old Red Pier in order to accommodate larger vessels at all states of the tide; the cost of the work was estimated at £262,000. But before construction could start, parts of the existing structure had to be demolished. Demolition of the old Red Pier Head, and the fine Georgian era lighthouse was scheduled together with the head of the Fort Anne Jetty. The improvements consisted of extending the Red Pier by 400 ft (122 m) and widened to 70 ft (21 m). A considerable feature of the work was the construction of an openwork viaduct of reinforced concrete 50 ft (15 m) wide, which crossed Circus Beach to the rear of the Isle of Man Steam Packet Company warehouses and the Imperial Hotel and joined the Victoria Pier at its base.

The structural alterations to the Fort Anne Breakwater consisted of the removal of the rounded end and the erection of timbered dolphins running parallel with the extended Red Pier, to fend off shipping from the shoal water from the Fort Anne beach. Dredging took place either side of the Red Pier extension to give a depth of 15 ft (5 m) at low water of an ordinary spring tide, thus providing additional deep water berths on the north and south sides of the extension.

Work continued through the early 1930s and was completed by 1936. On completion this extended structure was to bear the name of the then sovereign and Lord of Mann, King Edward VIII, and is the only public facility in the British Isles to be named in his honour.

The first passenger sailing from the extended pier took place on Sunday January 5th, 1936. The sailing as undertaken by the RMS Rushen Castle, the use of the pier being as a consequence of an easterly gale.

The official opening of the King Edward VIII Pier took place on Saturday 23 May 1936. The ceremony was performed by the then Home Secretary, Sir John Simon accompanied by the Lieutenant Governor of the Isle of Man, Sir Montague Butler. Numerous civic dignitaries were in attendance and included Harold Matthews, Secretary of the Isle of Man Harbour Commissioners.

== Victoria Pier ==
With the growth of tourism from the 1860s onwards, it became increasingly apparent that the Red Pier could not handle the volume of traffic using the port and in addition therefore a facility would be required which would allow steamers to discharge their passenger, alongside the pier, at any state of the tide. The Victoria Pier was constructed to allow this to occur and officially opened on 1 July 1872 the opening ceremony being performed by Island's Lieutenant Governor, Henry Loch.

The berthing facilities at the port were enhanced significantly and in time a 400 feet extension was added.

== Inner Harbour (Douglas Marina) ==
The Inner Harbour lies to the West of the Outer Harbour, and allows access and berthing of small vessels. It is approached through a narrow passage over which passes the Bascule Bridge, a 1979 pedestrian bridge which replaced the former steel vehicular swing bridge. The rivers Dhoo and Glass feed into the Inner Harbour; a pier known as The Tongue separates the rivers from the main useable area of the Inner harbour. Until recently, the Inner Harbour would dry out at low tide, but in 2001 the "Flap Gate" was installed, creating a half tide dock. This maintains sufficient water for vessels to remain afloat at all times, (but the Flap Gate inevitably restricts access to the sea once it is raised). After the installation of the Flap Gate, pontoons were set up in the Inner Harbour to increase berthing capacity for yachts and small working boats. Since 2001, the Inner Harbour has become known as "Douglas Marina".

== Radar Installation ==
History was made at Douglas Harbour on Friday 27 February 1948, when the port became the first in the world to be equipped with radar. The installation was officially opened by the Lieutenant Governor of the Isle of Man, Air Vice Marshal Geoffrey Bromet. The occasion attracted world wide interest, with the ceremony being photographed and filmed. The number of passengers being handled at the port at that time numbered approximately 1.5 million and the installation provided enhanced safety. The radar mast was of a lattice design and stood at 60 ft (18 m) and was installed by Cossar AeroSpace.

== Douglas Bay Marine Nature Reserve ==
On 1 September 2018 the whole of Douglas Bay was designated as a Marine Nature Reserve, with statutory protection under the Wildlife Act 1990.

== Hazards ==
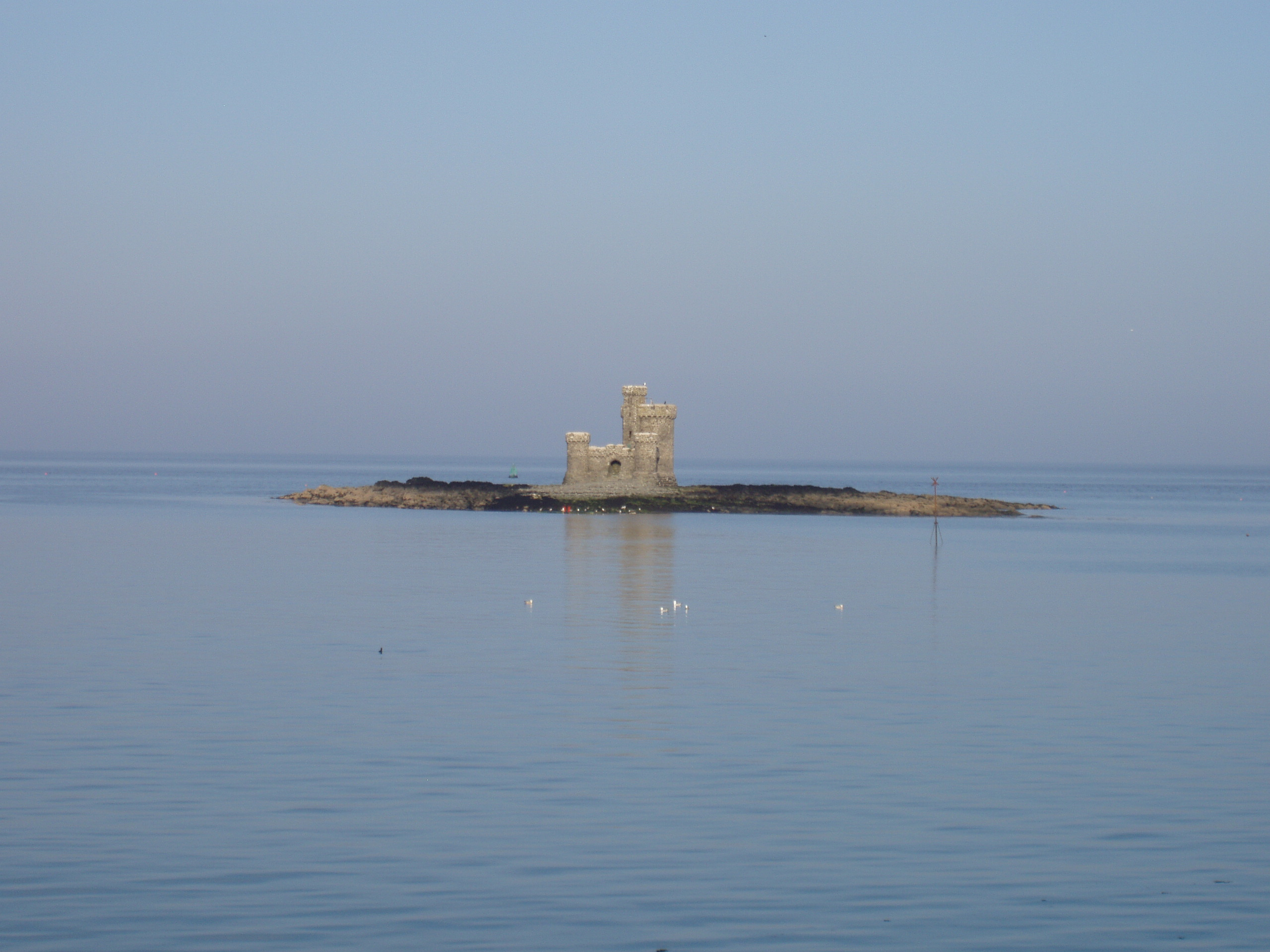
St. Mary's Isle in Douglas Bay as seen from the Loch Promenade.

Conister Rock, also known as St Mary's Isle, is a small islet immediately to the north of the harbour. It is completely submerged at high tide, and cannot be seen during stormy, night, or other low visibility conditions. The islet caused many shipwrecks until the Tower of Refuge was built on it.
