= TSS Manxman (1904) =

British turbine steamship

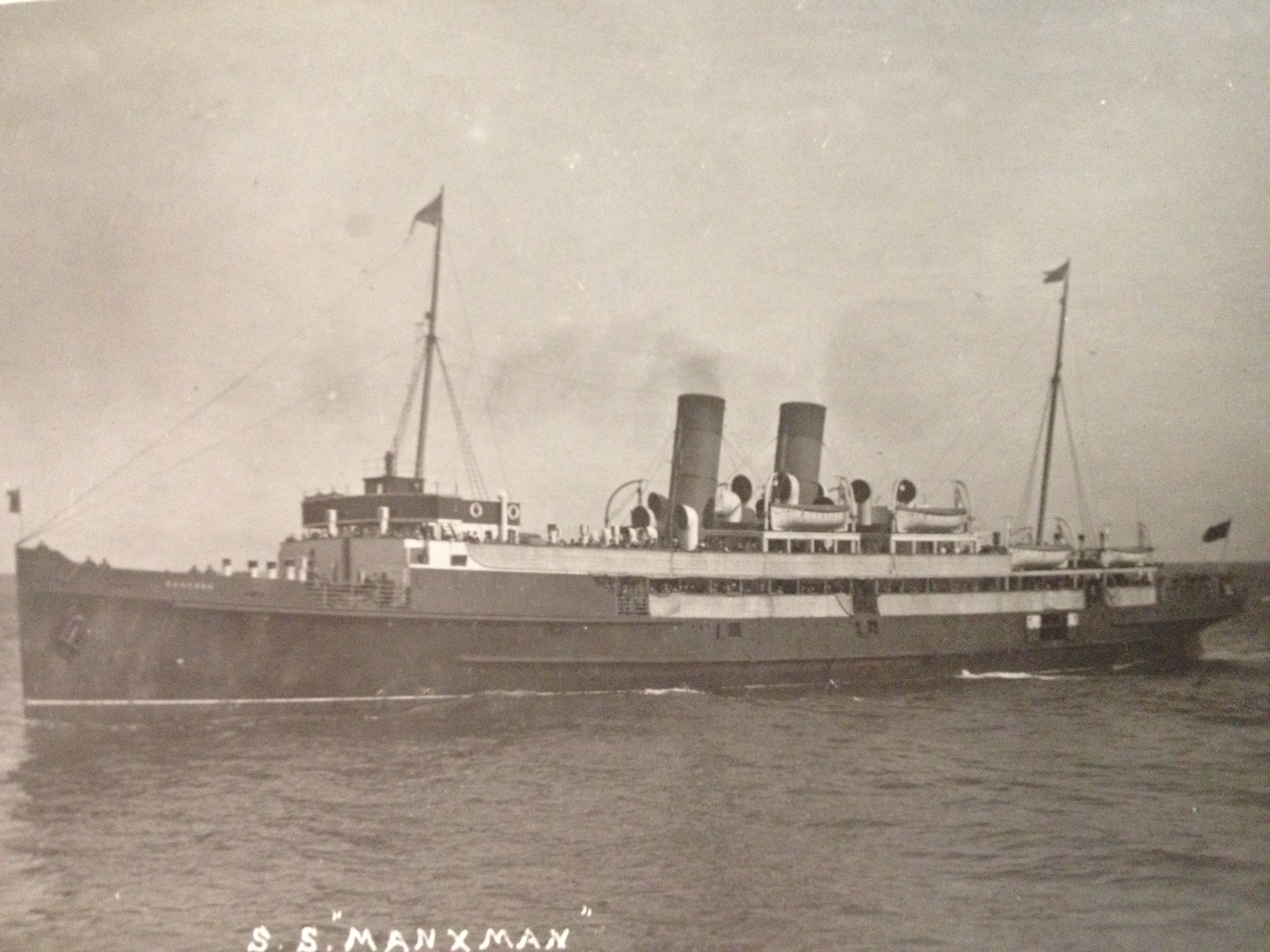
- Manxman

History

United Kingdom
- Name: 1904: Manxman; 1941: Caduceus; 1945: Manxman
- Owner: 1904: Midland Railway; 1920: IoMSPCo
- Builder: Vickers, Sons & Maxim, Barrow
- Yard number: 315
- Laid down: 1903
- Launched: 15 June 1904
- Acquired: 1915
- Commissioned: 17 April 1916 (as HMS Manxman); October 1941 (as HMS Caduceus)
- Decommissioned: 24 December 1919
- Identification: official number 118603; code letters HMRS (until 1933); call sign GFPS (by 1930)
- Fate: Sold for scrap 9 August 1949

General characteristics
- Type: ferry
- Tonnage: 2,174 GRT, 629 NRT
- Length: 341 ft (104 m) overall; 334.0 ft (101.8 m) registered length
- Beam: 43.1 ft (13.1 m)
- Draught: 16 ft (4.9 m)
- Depth: 17.3 ft (5.3 m)
- Installed power: 6,300 shp, 1,300 rhp
- Propulsion: 3 × screws; 3 × steam turbines
- Speed: 22 knots (41 km/h)
- Complement: in Royal Navy service: 250
- Crew: in civilian service: 80
- Armament: 2 × 4 in (100 mm) guns; 1 × 6-pounder (57mm) AA guns
- Aircraft carried: 8 seaplanes

TSS Manxman was a turbine steamship launched in 1904 for the Midland Railway and operated between Heysham and Douglas, Isle of Man. In 1916, she was commissioned by the Royal Navy as HMS Manxman and saw action as a seaplane carrier during the First World War, after which she was acquired by the Isle of Man Steam Packet Company. On the outbreak of the Second World War she was again requisitioned as a troop ship, until she was commissioned and her name changed to HMS Caduceus. She never returned to Manx waters, and was scrapped in August 1949.

== Building and dimensions ==
Vickers, Sons & Maxim built Manxman at Barrow-in-Furness. Her keel was laid in 1903 and she was launched on 15 June 1904. She was a steel-hulled ship with a registered length of 334.0 ft (101.8 m), beam of 43.1 ft (13.1 m) and depth of 17.3 ft (5.3 m). As built, her tonnages were 2,174 GRT and 629 NRT. She had three screws, each driven by a steam turbine. Her boilers' working pressure was 200 psi and her turbines developed 10,000 indicated horsepower resulting in a service speed of 22 knots (41 km/h). She was certificated to carry 2,020 passengers and had a crew of 80.

The Midland Railway registered her at Douglas. Her UK official number was 118603 and until 1933 her code letters were HMRS. By 1930 her call sign was GFPS.

== Service ==
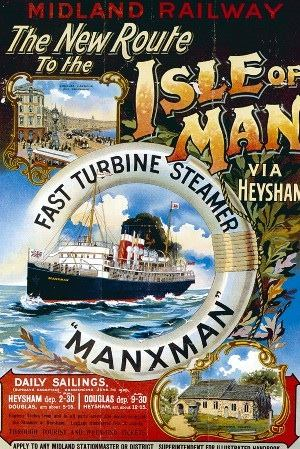
Midland Railway publicity poster; advertising passage to the Isle of Man via Heysham aboard Manxman.

=== Midland Railway ===
Manxman was completed in September 1904 and entered Midland Railway service on the Heysham to Douglas run. The Admiralty requisitioned her in January 1915.

=== First World War: HMS Manxman ===
Manxman was converted for her wartime role at Chatham Dockyard. The conversion included two aircraft hangars and a flying-off deck. She was commissioned as HMS Manxman on 17 April 1916. Her operating aircraft included Sopwith Baby, Sopwith Pup, Sopwith Camel and Short Type 184. She served with the Grand Fleet until October 1917, and was then transferred to the Eastern Mediterranean.

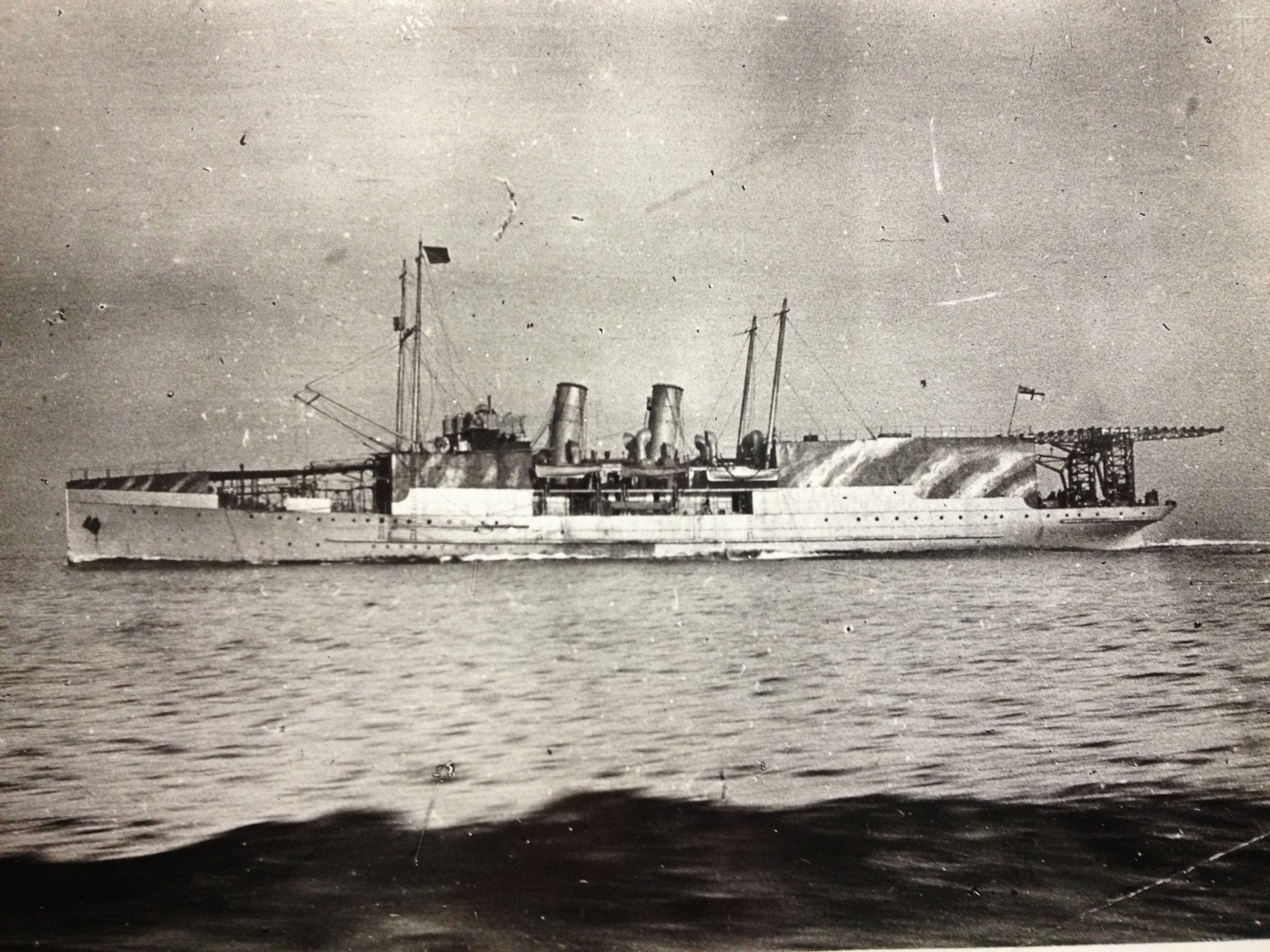
HMS Manxman in Great War service

Manxman lacked the speed of her fellow seaplane carriers Ben-my-Chree and Viking, and she had lost her place in the entourage of the Grand Fleet because her conversion had made her just too slow. The C-in-C of the Fleet, Admiral Beatty, wrote a letter from HMS Iron Duke on 11 January 1917, in which he said that the Manxman was unfit for service with the Battle Cruiser Fleet "owing to her lack of speed" - these last six words were added in Beatty's own handwriting.

However, Manxman made one contribution to aviation history. She had introduced the Sopwith Pup single-seat fighter, and this aircraft could take off from her launching platform in only 20 feet in a 20-knot wind.

The mathematics were in the fighter's favour; its wing loading was only five pounds per square foot and its power loading 16.4 pounds per horsepower; thus producing a significant power-to-weight ratio. This small machine had a Le Rhone engine of 80 hp, giving it a speed of 112 mph at sea level and 103 mph at 9,000 feet. Flotation bags were used to enable it to land alongside the Manxman, and it was then hoisted aboard. At the war's end she was sent down to East Africa, arriving in Zanzibar on 22 November, before returning to Britain, where she arrived at Plymouth on the same day as the Viking. HMS Manxman was paid off in May 1919, and released from requisition on Christmas Eve of that year.

=== Isle of Man Steam Packet Company ===
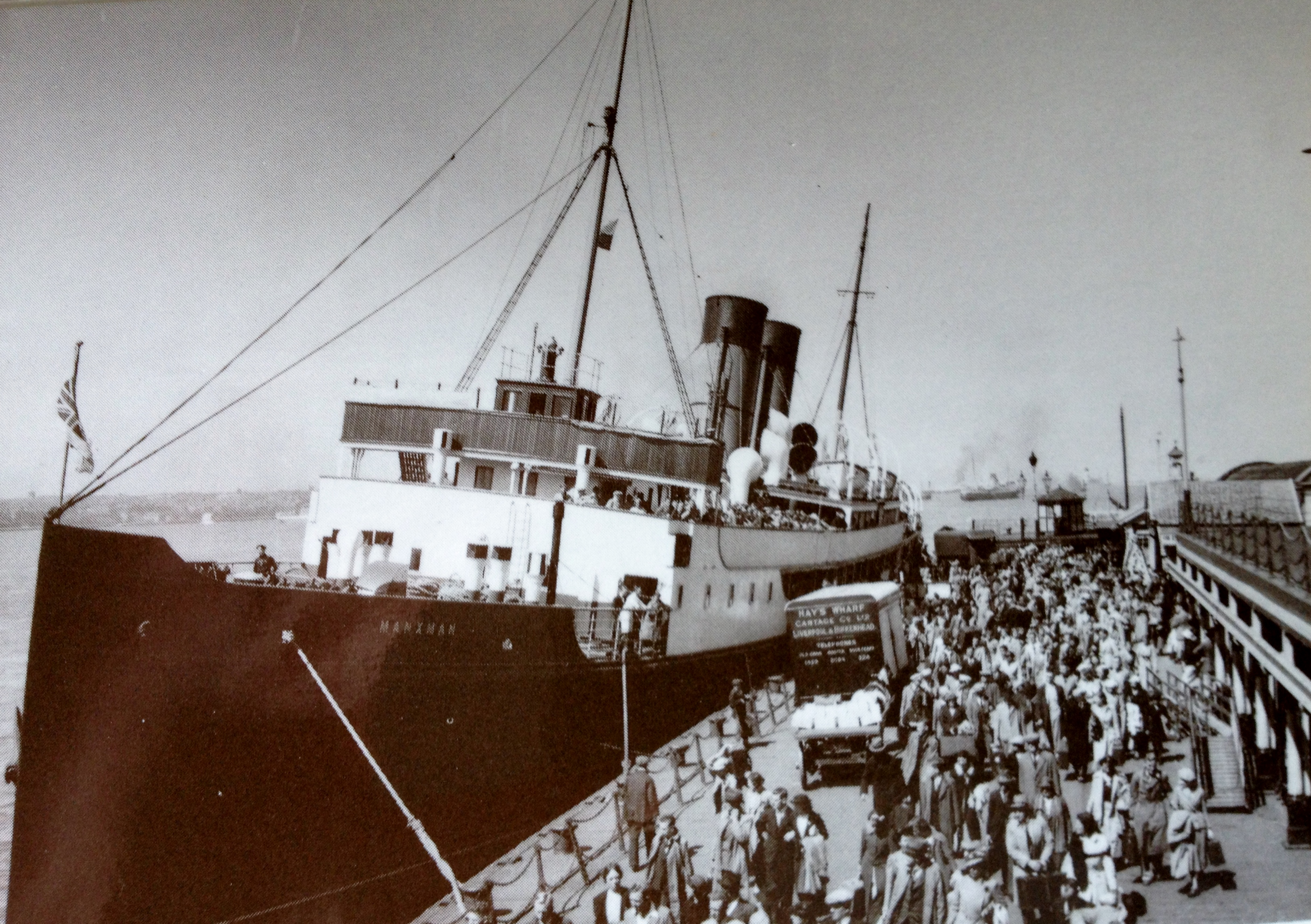
Passengers disembark from Manxman at the Pier Head, Liverpool.

Of eleven Steam Packet ships either bought or chartered by the Admiralty in the Great War, only four returned to service with the company after the cessation of hostilities, and consequently, new ships were going to be needed to handle the resumption of peacetime traffic. However, industry as a whole was in a disorganised and seriously run-down state after the challenges of the war years, and new ships could not possibly be built in time for the tourist influx of 1919.

The company compromised, and starting with the purchase of Mona, they set about redressing their wartime losses.

The Isle of Man Steam Packet Company bought Manxman from the Admiralty in March 1920, and she was the first ship in the line's history to be so named. She kept her original name. Upon her purchase, being the largest steamship in the fleet, Manxman became the Commodore Ship under Captain Cain, a position she retained until the introduction into service of the Ben-my-Chree in 1927.

She was converted to burn oil in 1921, and was the first company ship to use oil fuel. Manxman and her sister Manx Maid, were at first the only two ships sailing in 1926, the year of the General Strike, when the miners' dispute made it nearly impossible for coal-fired ships to operate.

Manxman operated to every one of the numerous ports then served by the Steam Packet. Known as a reliable ship, she enjoyed a trouble free life until she once again found herself at war.

=== Second World War: HMS Caduceus ===
The Manxman had started the Great War in the colours of the Midland Railway, and had been converted to a seaplane carrier. During the Second World War, however, she was requisitioned by the Ministry of War Transport as a personnel ship. Manxman served alongside seven of her Steam Packet sisters during Operation Dynamo. On 29 May, she was one of ten personnel ships which together took off 14,760 troops from the East Pier. She returned to Dunkirk on the morning of 2 June, when the operation was getting near its close, and embarked 177 troops. In all, Manxman evacuated 2,394 men.

No sooner had she returned from her final journey to Dunkirk, she was ordered west to Dartmouth, where she had the ironical experience of being fired on by a small guard boat that had obviously not been alerted to her arrival. Within a few hours she was redirected to Southampton, and this was to be the start of the most active phase of Manxman's war.

The evacuation of the ports of north-west France was beginning, and Manxman's crew knew the coast well, having spent some months before Dunkirk carrying troops to Le Havre and Cherbourg. Within what seemed a few days she made a succession of trips to the French ports under the command of Captain P. B. Cowley. At Cherbourg she embarked retreating Allied troops as the enemy approached the port, and returned to Southampton, often under air attack. Once back on the South Coast of England she disembarked the men she had brought back, refuelled, and was off again almost at once. It was dangerous and sleepless work well remembered by veterans from the Manxman's officers and crew, among whom were Chief Officer Lyndhurst Callow, and Second Officer A. W. G. Kissack, who later became the company's Marine Superintendent. As the days advanced the shelling came nearer, the raids more frequent, and the Cherbourg harbour area necessarily more congested with survival boats, wrecks and the debris of battle. It was "Dunkirk" again, but on a smaller scale. Meanwhile the Manxman, with no protective armament of her own, continued to venture in and out of the firing.

As conditions became desperate and further Allied evacuation became impossible, the destroyer L.11. was specifically sent at full speed of 36 knots from Portsmouth to help cover the Manxman's escape. Chief Officer Callow, who survived to become Commodore of the Steam Packet Company fleet, vividly recalled how the ship eventually pulled out from Cherbourg:

"The large cranes along the dockside had been blasted and broken, and were one of the many hazards to shipping. Tanks were approaching the harbour area; the remnants of the Allied armies were fighting them off as best they could. The Manxman herself was laden with troops and with stacked ammunition, small arms and even field weapons saved from the catastrophe – one hit from an enemy aircraft could have blown up the entire ship."

Despite the odds, Manxman escaped, with her crew having been forced to cut her mooring ropes with axes. The Manxman then pulled out, thanks to fire cover from a Royal Navy destroyer, which had turned her forward guns on to the German tank column as it advanced down the quayside. Rommel is even said to have referred to her in his papers, describing her as a "cheeky two-funnel steamer". When Manxman pulled out for the last time, Rommel's main army was only a few miles away.

The Manxman's main duties were at Cherbourg, but she was also deeply involved at the small port of St Malo, to the east, where she was the last ship to leave the shattered harbour.

In October 1941, she was fitted out as an RDF – Radio Direction Finding Vessel – and having been taken over for the second time by the Admiralty, she was commissioned as HMS Caduceus. She was then ordered to her former home port of Douglas, where on Douglas Head there was situated one of the early radar training stations - HMS Valkyrie.

From Douglas she spent some time on patrol in the Irish Sea, while naval personnel were initiated into the workings of radio direction finding. Her work was not without its mishaps, and Caduceus was twice damaged when colliding with the Victoria Pier, Douglas, and was sent to Belfast for repairs.

After her repairs, the Admiralty removed her from the station as it was decreed that Douglas Harbour was not suitable for a ship of her size – a strange finding, bearing in mind that Douglas had for so many years been her home port.

Caduceus made passage to the River Clyde and continued her radar training duties, only to be driven ashore near Greenock in a fierce gale in February 1943.

She was reconditioned with her own name restored, and Manxman then returned to personnel vessel duties.

She acted as a troop carrier and eventually moved to the traffic between Harwich and Tilbury and the Belgian and Dutch ports, bringing over service personnel, civilians and displaced persons.

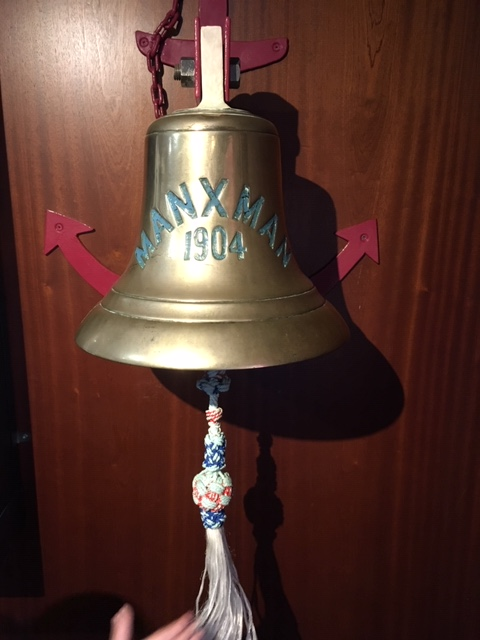
Ship's bell of Manxman at the House of Manannan, Peel, Isle of Man

== Disposal ==
Transferred to Ministry of War Transport in 1945, she worked as a troop carrier in the English Channel. Transferred to British Army of the Rhine (B.A.O.R.) military service as "Manxman", troop carrying on the Harwich-Hook of Holland service. She was never to return home to Manx waters, and after a somewhat punishing but nonetheless adventurous life, she was withdrawn in February 1949, no longer fit for use, and was subsequently laid up at Barrow-in-Furness.

Manxman was scrapped in August 1949 at Preston, Lancashire.

== Popular culture ==
Life buoys displaying the name "SS Manxman" are featured in the 1935 film No Limit, starring George Formby. In the film the main character is sailing to participate in the Isle of Man TT. As Formby's character approaches the Prince's Landing Stage at Liverpool, the ship seen at the berth is not Manxman, but Mona's Queen adorned in the Steam Packet's summer livery of white and green – this livery was only ever applied to Mona's Queen, Lady of Mann and Ben-my-Chree.

During a following scene, Formby is required to retrieve the hat of a lady, which he had inadvertently knocked over the ship's side. In his attempt to return the hat, Formby falls into the water and people on board the ship throw life buoys to him with "SS Manxman" clearly visible. As this scene was shot in a studio, the conclusion must be that the life buoys were made specifically for the scene, and are merely theatrical props.
