= SS Viking (1905) =

British steel ship

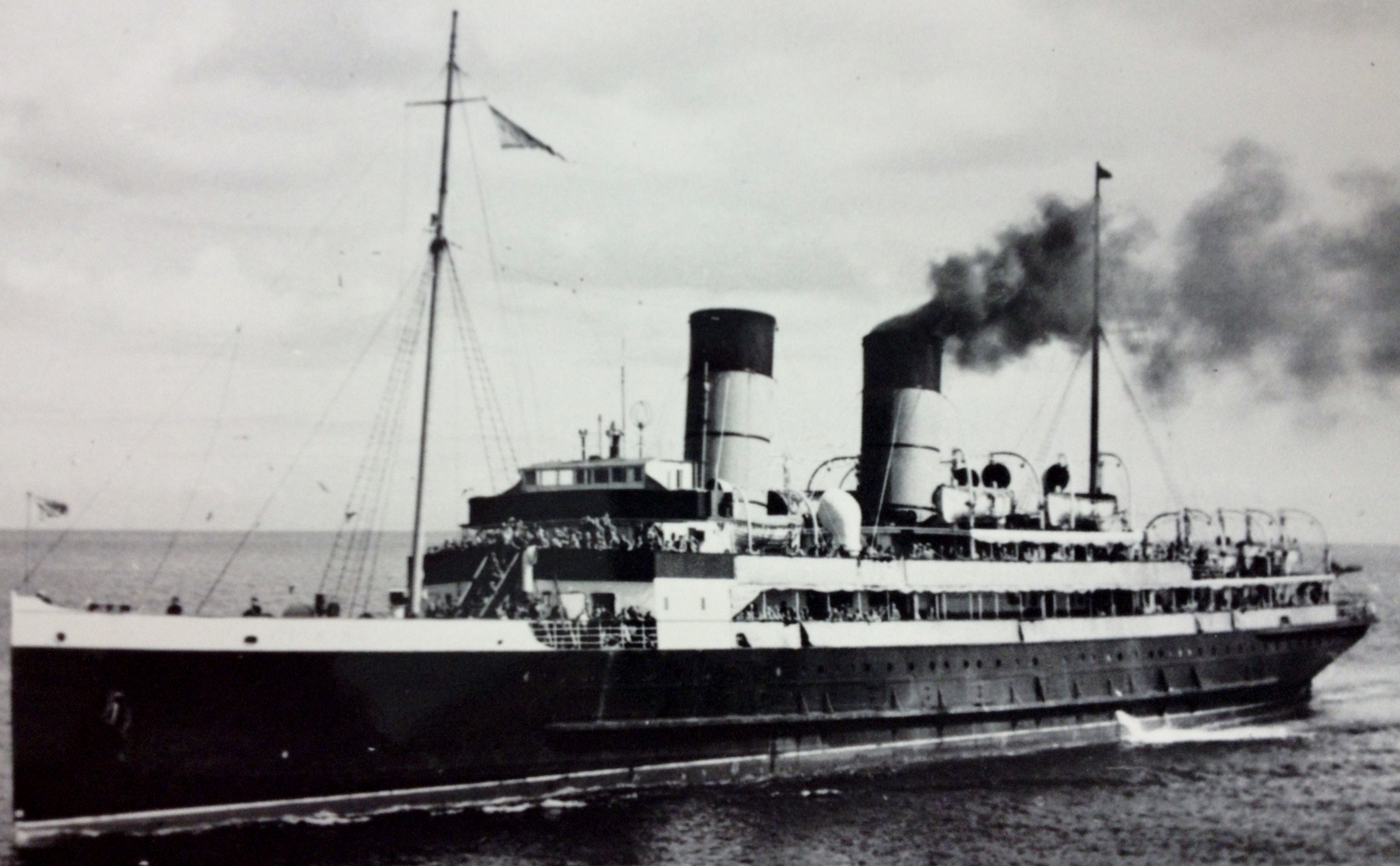
- Viking

History
- Name: Viking
- Owner: 1905 - 1954: Isle of Man Steam Packet Company.
- Operator: 1905 - 1954: IoMSPCo.
- Port of registry: Douglas, Isle of Man
- Route: 1905 - 1954: Douglas - Fleetwood
- Builder: Armstrong Whitworth, Newcastle on Tyne
- Cost: £83,900
- Way number: 118604
- Laid down: 1905
- Launched: 9 March 1905
- In service: 1905
- Out of service: 1954
- Identification: Official Number 118604; Code Letters; H R C S; Code Letters; G P M D
- Fate: Scrapped at Barrow in Furness 1954

General characteristics
- Type: Passenger Steamer
- Tonnage: 1,957 gross register tons (GRT)
- Length: 350 feet (110 m)
- Beam: 42 feet (13 m)
- Depth: 17 ft 3 in (5.3 m)
- Installed power: 10,000 shp (7,500 kW)
- Propulsion: Three sets of direct-acting turbines manufactured by the Parsons Marine Steam Turbine Company, driving three shafts producing 10,000 shp (7,500 kW)
- Speed: 22 knots (41 km/h; 25 mph)
- Capacity: 2,000 passengers
- Crew: 80

SS (RMS) Viking was a steel, triple-screw turbine-driven passenger steamer operated by the Isle of Man Steam Packet Company between 1905 and 1954.

== Construction & dimensions ==
Viking was built at Armstrong Whitworth's Walker Shipyard on the River Tyne and was launched by Miss Woodhead on Thursday 9 March 1905. Viking was the first turbine-driven vessel in the company's history.

A contemporary report at the time described her as: "The finest steamer that has ever bourne the shield of the company".

Length 350 feet; beam 42 feet'; depth 17 feet 3 inches. Viking had accommodation for a crew of 80, and was certificated to carry 2,000 passengers; saloon accommodation was aft and steerage passengers were carried forward.

Her engines developed 10,000 i.h.p., which gave her a service speed of 22 knots. Viking underwent her sea trials in late May 1905.

Viking's three propellers were driven by three sets of Parsons direct-acting turbines, the higher pressure in the centre and the lower pressure in each wing. She had a boiler steam pressure of 160 pounds p.s.i. The astern turbines, which operated on the wing propellers, were incorporated in the low-pressure casings. She was in service until 1954, and became the last coal-burning passenger ship in Steam Packet service. Her furnaces would consume 60 tons of coal on a round trip between Douglas and Fleetwood.

== Service life ==
=== 1905–1915 ===
Although Viking's registered speed was 22 knots (41 km/h) and the company's own records claim 22.5 knots, she was known to have made 24 knots (44 km/h; 28 mph) on occasions. It was said that only the senior Cunard liners were faster, and she was certainly the fastest in the Manx trade.

On 25 May 1907 Viking recorded the fastest time for passage between Fleetwood and Douglas, completing the journey 2 hours 22 minutes at an average speed of 23.2 knots (43.0 km/h; 26.7 mph). On 22 July, operating in the return direction, she made passage in a time of 2 hours 24 minutes, averaging 22.6 knots (41.9 km/h; 26.0 mph).

Viking was ordered and intended for the Fleetwood–Douglas service to oppose the Midland Railway Company's Manxman, which was also a turbine steamer and which ran from Heysham to the Isle of Man.

=== First World War Service ===
The Viking was requisitioned by the Admiralty on 23 March 1915 and was purchased outright later that year. Following her fitting out she was commissioned at Liverpool on 11 August.

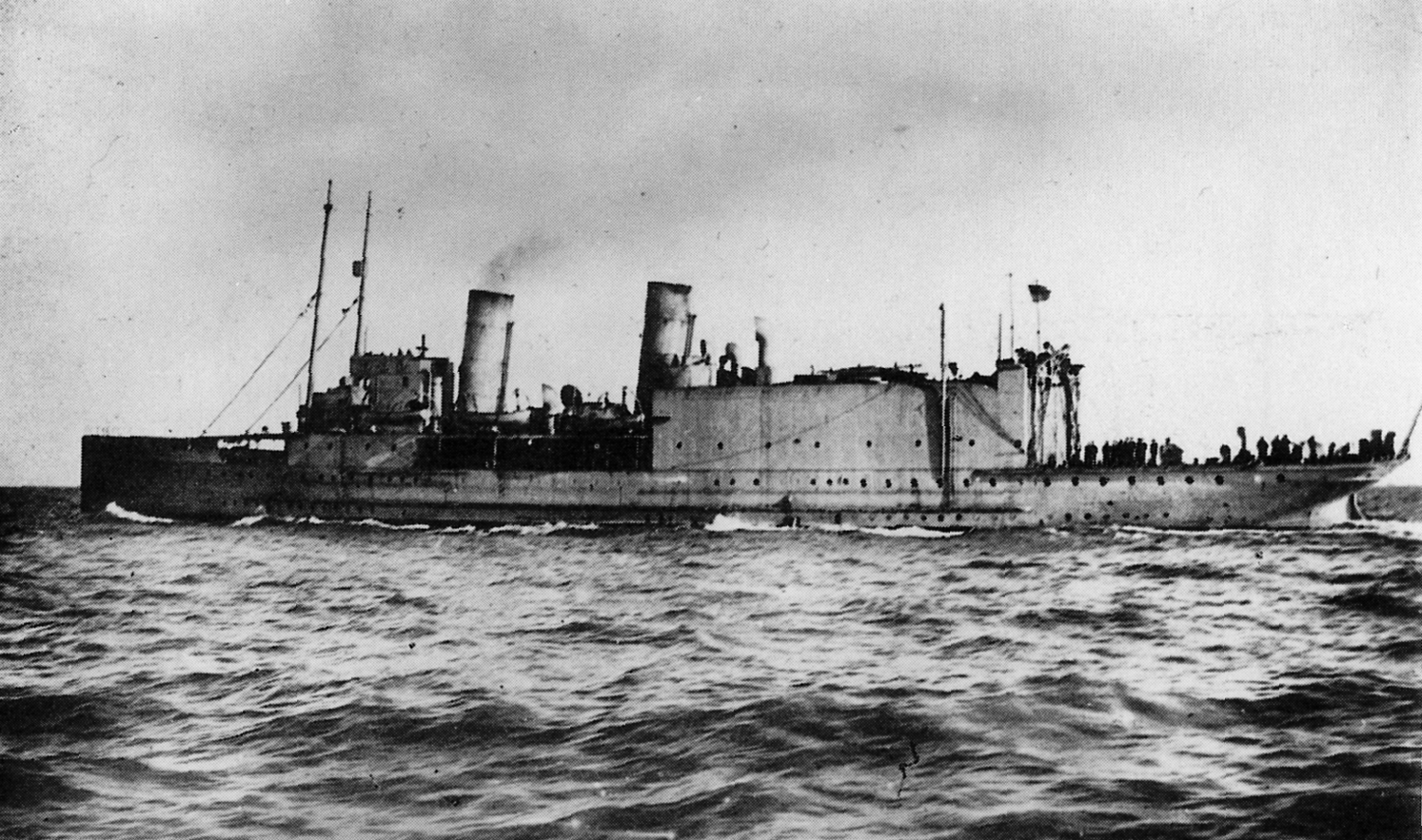
HMS Vindex during operational service.

She was named Vindex by the Admiralty, who purchased her on 11 October. She had been converted to a Seaplane Carrier in similar fashion to the Ben-my-Chree and first served at the Nore and Harwich before proceeding to the Mediterranean.

Vindex carried four Short Type 184 seaplanes and could also carry up to four Bristol Scout fighters. The Bristol Scout was a landplane on wheels and consequently at the end of a mission it would have to ditch and remain supported by flotation bags until it could be lifted back on board by crane.

Vindex was attached to the Grand Fleet at Harwich in November 1915. On 3 November one of her fighter aircraft, piloted by Sub. Lieut. H. F. Towler was launched from her flying off platform, soon to be called the Flight deck. This was the first instance of a land plane with a wheeled undercarriage taking off from the deck of an aircraft carrier. Towler's achievement soon led to Bristol Scouts taking off regularly from the short platforms of these small aircraft carriers.

In 1916 Vindex conducted more flying experiments at sea, and again they were successful. She carried Sopwith 1½ Strutter fighters that had been fitted with skids instead of wheels. Using these skids as slides, the aircraft were able to fly off from the carrier's forward trackway, which was 64 feet (20 m) long.

After her work with the Harwich and other North Sea forces, Vindex went to the Eastern Mediterranean in 1918, where she did work similar to the Ben-my-Chree. She operated there until the end of the War and returned to Plymouth in March 1919.

=== 1919–1939 ===
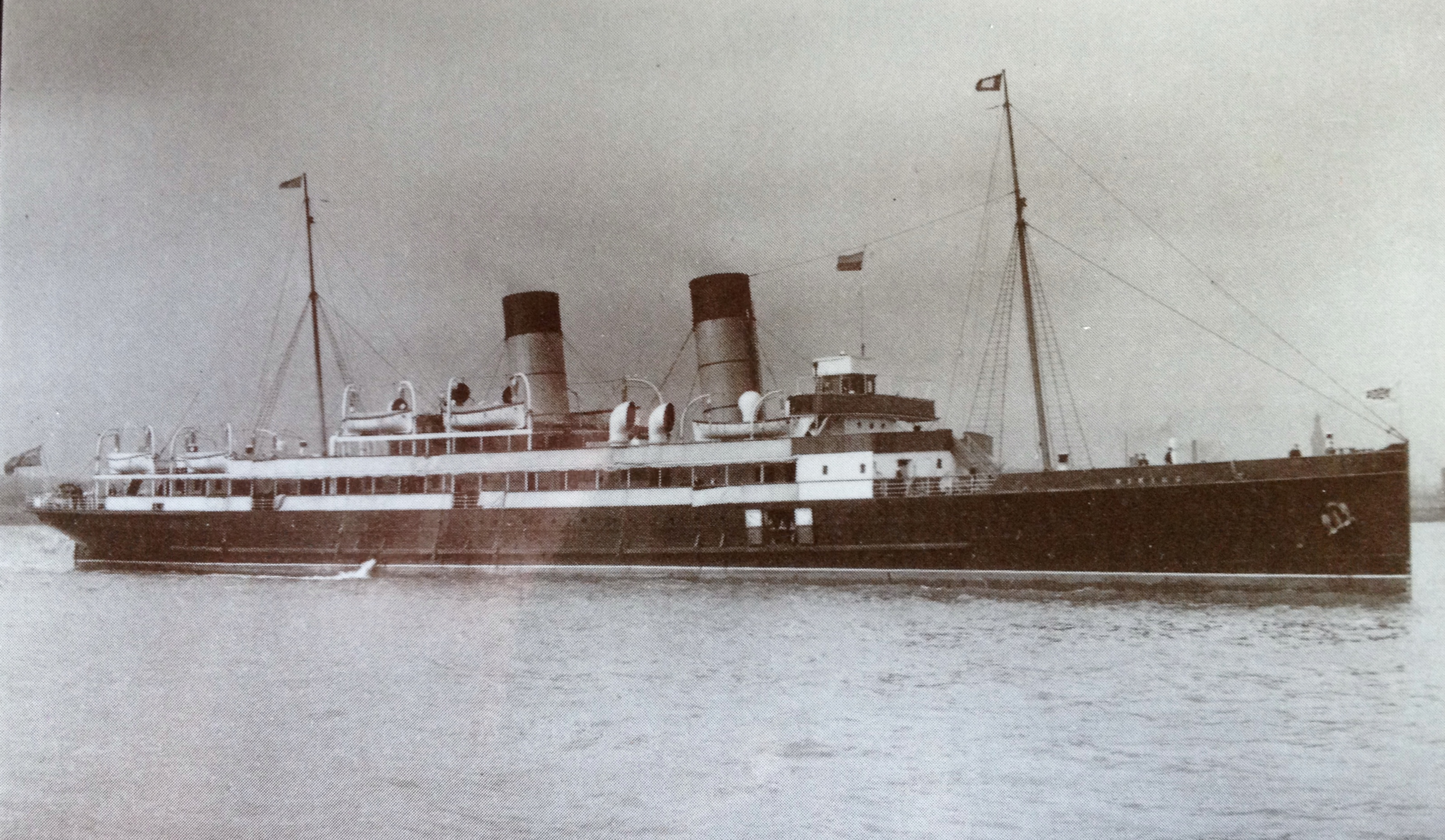
Viking pictured in the Mersey.

Vindex was sold back to the Isle of Man Steam Packet Company in April 1919, and reverted to her original name, rejoining the fleet after her conversion back to a passenger steamer in July 1920.

For another ten years she dominated the Fleetwood–Douglas service until she was replaced following the introduction into service in 1930 of the Lady of Mann. When the Lady of Mann commenced her sailings to Fleetwood, Viking, although still serving the port, also began to undertake more general work.

=== Second World War Service ===
Viking was requisitioned in the first week of the War, in September 1939, and operated as a personnel vessel. She acted as a transport, mainly to Cherbourg from Southampton.

Although actively engaged in transporting the men and matériel of the British Expeditionary Force to France at the outbreak of hostilities, the Viking did not take part in the critical Operation Dynamo, for she had recently been bombed in the Thames Estuary and was undergoing repairs. Nonetheless, she was active in the latter stages of the BEF's withdrawal from France.

Captained by James Bridson, with Edward Gelling and Harry Kinley as chief and second officers, Viking was involved in Operation Aerial at Le Havre and later Cherbourg. Following this she was despatched to Guernsey to assist in the Evacuation of the Channel Islands. Viking arrived at Saint Peter Port prepared to take off evacuees and consequently evacuated 1,800 schoolchildren, almost the entire juvenile population of the island. The children were safely landed at Weymouth.

Following that phase of the War, she made passage to Barrow in Furness and then was laid up at the Tongue in Douglas Harbour before resuming her civilian run between Fleetwood and Douglas.

Viking was requisitioned again, initially she was involved in the trooping service to Orkney and Shetland and then served as a Fleet Air Arm target vessel based on Crail for seven months from June 1942.

From December 1943 until 1945 she was again used as a personnel ship.

Viking was in service off the French Coast during the D-Day. On 28 June 1944 she was hit by a flying bomb whilst undergoing maintenance in the Surrey Commercial Docks, London.

She was taken out of war support in June 1945 and subsequently returned to the Steam Packet.

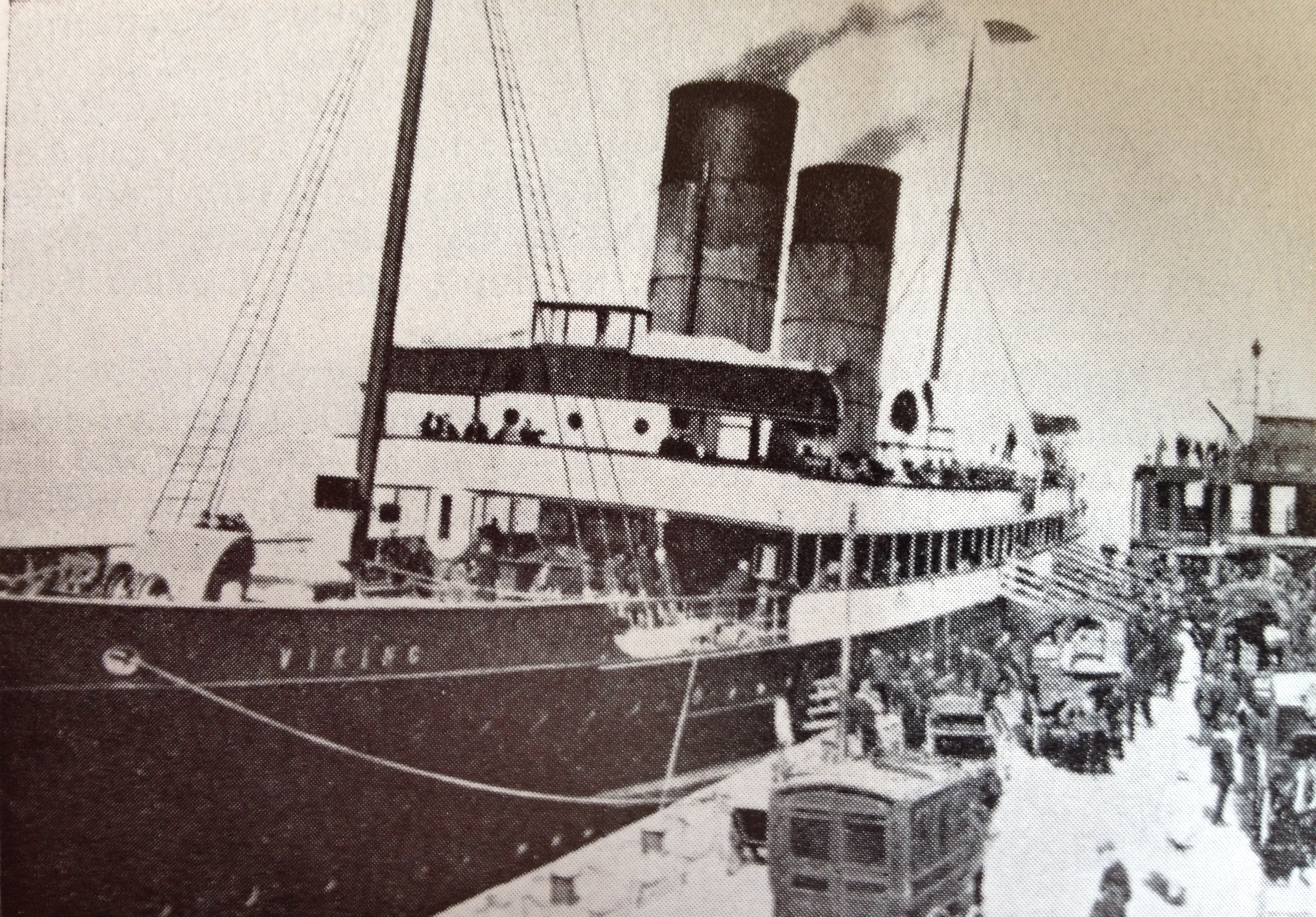
Viking.

=== Post war ===
Following her war service Viking returned to the Steam Packet in June 1945. Her refit following her de-requisition had been hurried and this led to her having to undergo a more comprehensive refit at the yards of Cammell Laird in 1949. Over the winter of 1950/51 she returned to Laird's for further work which included her turbines being rebladed.

== Disposal ==
Viking finished her Steam Packet service on the Fleetwood schedule on 14 August 1954. Two days later she sailed for Barrow under her own steam to be broken up. After 49 years of service, Viking was broken up by Thos. W. Ward at Barrow.

== Trivia ==
Viking had a long association with the Port of Fleetwood. To commemorate this, on 24 May 1955, the Directors of the Isle of Man Steam Packet Company presented Viking's Ship's bell to the Borough of Fleetwood as a memento of the long association of the ship and the town. The engraved bell was for many years hanging in the 'Viking Bar' on Fleetwood Pier until the pier's closure.

== Official number and code letters ==
Official numbers are issued by individual flag states. They should not be confused with IMO ship identification numbers. Viking had the UK Official Number 118604 and originally used the Code Letters H R C S. Following her Great War Service these were changed to G P M D.
