= SS Mona's Queen (1934) =

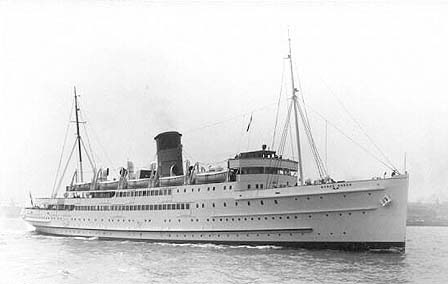
- Mona's Queen

History

Isle of Man
- Name: Mona's Queen
- Owner: 1934–1940: Isle of Man Steam Packet Company
- Operator: 1934–1940: Isle of Man Steam Packet Company
- Port of registry: Douglas, Isle of Man
- Builder: Cammell Laird, Birkenhead
- Cost: £201,250
- Yard number: 998
- Way number: 145308
- Laid down: 27 October 1933
- Launched: 12 April 1934
- Completed: 25 June 1934
- Maiden voyage: 1934
- Out of service: May 1940
- Identification: ON 145308; Code Letters G W S G
- Fate: Sunk at Dunkirk, 29 May 1940

General characteristics
- Type: Passenger Steamer
- Tonnage: 2,756 gross register tons (GRT)
- Length: 347 feet (106 m)
- Beam: 48 feet (15 m)
- Depth: 17 feet (5.2 m)
- Decks: 5
- Ice class: N/A
- Installed power: 8,500 shp (6,300 kW)
- Propulsion: Two sets of single-reduction Parson's-geared turbines; developing 8,500 shp (6,300 kW)
- Speed: 22 knots (41 km/h; 25 mph)
- Capacity: 2,486 passengers
- Crew: 83

TSS (RMS) Mona's Queen (III) No. 145308, was a ship built for the Isle of Man Steam Packet Company in 1934. The steamer, which was the third vessel in the company's history to bear the name, was one of five ships to be specially commissioned by the company between 1927 and 1937. They were replacements for the various second-hand steamers that had been purchased to replace the company's losses during the First World War. However, the life of the Mona's Queen proved to be short: six years after being launched she was sunk by a sea mine during the Dunkirk evacuation on 29 May 1940.

== Construction ==
Ordered in August, 1933, Mona's Queen was built by Cammell Laird at Birkenhead at a cost of £30,000 (approx. £12.3 million in 2017). Mona's Queen was the sixth vessel to be built in the Birkenhead yards for the Isle of Man Steam Packet Company, and was completed in June 1934.

Constructed under special survey in accordance with the requirements of Lloyd's Register of Shipping and Classification, Mona's Queen was classed as A.1 "with freeboard for Irish Channel Service." The clerk of the works on behalf of the Company for the building of Mona's Queen was Charles Cannell.

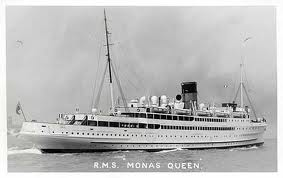
Mona's Queen pictured departing Liverpool.

== Features ==
=== Design and layout ===
The vessel had a registered tonnage of 2,756; a depth of 17 feet (5.2 m); a length of 347 feet (106 m) (336 feet (102 m) between the perpendiculars); beam of 48 feet (15 m) and a speed of 22 knots. She was certified for 2,486 passengers and a crew of 83.

There were 5 decks: the Boat Deck, Promenade Deck, Shelter Deck, Main Deck and Lower Deck. The Boat Deck was 174 feet (53 m) long and the Promenade Deck 298 feet (91 m). The Promenade Deck on the Mona's Queen extended forward towards the bow giving the impression it was larger than even the Lady of Mann. The Shelter, Main and Lower decks extended the full length of the ship. She was considered to be an elegant ship because of her straight lines and elliptical stern.

Part of the space on the starboard side amidships on the main deck was occupied by provision rooms which included a refrigerated store, the ship was fitted with a Hallmark automatic refrigerator.

=== Power ===
Mona's Queen was propelled by twin screws driven through single reduction gearing by two sets of Parsons steam turbines. She was the first of the Company's ships to have water tube boilers, taking up less room than the scotch boilers previously used. Each set of turbines comprised a high pressure and a low pressure turbine. The high pressure turbines were of an impulse reduction type, two rows of impulse blading being followed by end tightened reaction blading, while the low pressure turbine ahead blading was of the all reaction type. The astern turbines were incorporated in the after ends of both high pressure and low pressure turbine casings and were capable of developing up to 70% of the full ahead power. The turbines were fitted with governors for overspeed control.

The turbines exhausted into a large condenser capable of maintaining a vacuum of 29 inches at full power and fitted with turbines of Alumbro composition made by Imperial Chemical Industries. The condensers were placed outboard of the turbines and their exhaust openings were connected directly to the lower portions of the low pressure turbine casings. This arrangement eliminated the requirement for large overhead trunking and greatly simplified the work of overhauling the low pressure turbines. In order to ensure a suitable feed of water, a water softening plant supplied by Paterson Engineering was fitted, and an electric salinometer was installed to test the salinity of the condensate from both port and starboard condensers and also of the reserve feed water.

Steam was supplied at 230 lbf/in by three water tube boilers. The boilers were oil fired and operated under the closed stokehold system of forced draught. The air for combustion was supplied by two large fans driven by enclosed forced-lubrication engines, manufactured by Matthew Paul & Co. The oil firing equipment was supplied by Babcock & Wilcox, a special feature being the electrically driven lighting up set. The fuel oil was carried in two deep tanks arranged on either side of the after boiler with the oil settling tanks placed behind the boiler at the centre of the ship. Two large pumps were provided for oil transfer purposes and an additional pump was provided for emergency bilge duties. A CO_{2} recorder was fitted in the boiler room to assist combustion control. For fire fighting purposes a Foamite Firefoam system was installed.

The air pumps were of the Weir Paragon type and circulating water was supplied by centrifugal pumps driven by compound enclosed forced lubrication engines. The air pumps discharged through a gravitation type filter to a large feed tank. A turbo pump would draw from the feeder tank and discharge through the feed heater to the boilers, with a further direct acting pump being provided as standby. The feed heater would provide an automatic drain control. Lubrication was provided by three pumps and the oil cooler was fitted with tubes of cupronikel.

==== Propellers ====
The propellers were three bladed, cast in bronze and designed by Cammell Lairds in collaboration with the National Physical Laboratory. The propeller revolutions at full power were approximately 275 revolutions per minute.

=== Technology ===
==== Watertight compartments ====
The hull was subdivided into 10 watertight compartments and 5 of her bulkheads were fitted with sliding watertight doors operated on the Brunton hydraulic system and controlled from the Navigating Bridge.

==== Rudder and steering ====
Mona's Queen had two rudders, one forward as well as an Oertz streamline type astern.

==== Radio communication ====
The ship was equipped with a Marconi C.W./I.C.W. Wireless installation together with a Marconi Echometer sounding device in order to derive the depth of water beneath the ship. Submarine signal receiving apparatus, with a distance finding capability was also installed, supplied by the Submarine Signal Co. (London) Ltd.

==== Electric power ====
Electric power was provided by two 90 kW turbo generators in addition to which a 35 kW diesel driven emergency generating set was fitted at the main deck level. As well as its emergency duties the 35 kW generator supplied current for essential services under harbour conditions when steam was not available.

== Passenger facilities ==
On board passenger accommodation was considered advanced for its day. It had 20 cabins, consisting of eight private cabins and 12 convertible cabins, including one that was specially decorated. Each cabin was fitted with sofa berths and a wash basin.

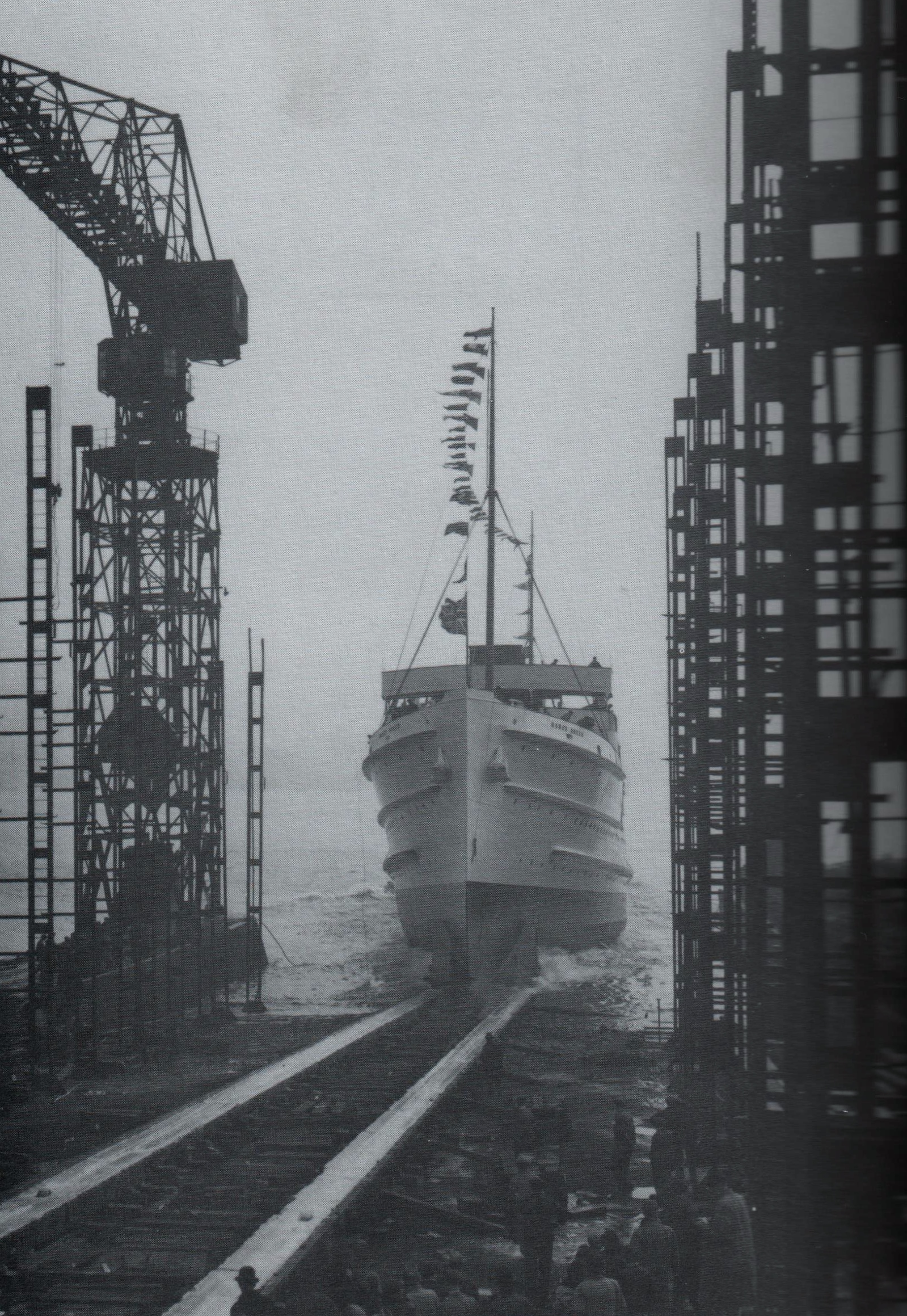
Launch of Mona's Queen, 12 April 1934.

The public rooms for the First Class passengers comprised a ladies' lounge on the Promenade Deck, a smoking room with a bar and a first class buffet on the Shelter Deck. A dining saloon with accommodation for 90 was situated forward on the Main Deck and a further 3 saloons on the Lower Deck. The Third Class rooms comprised an entrance hall on the shelter deck aft, with stairs leading down to a dining saloon and lounge and ladies' lounge on the Main Deck. A further two saloons were also situated on the Lower Deck.

Large promenading spaces were provided on the Shelter and Promenade Decks with screens on both sides of the ship fitted with vertically sliding windows. Screw operated, the windows were of a large area and were similar to those fitted to other ships in the Company.

The decoration of the First Class public rooms was specially designed for the vessel. The Ladies Lounge was panelled in light sycamore with jade green mouldings and furniture of mahogany. The Smoking Room was panelled in Olive teak; the First Class entrance and stairway from the Promenade Deck were in French walnut; the First Class Lounge in walnut and birch; the Dining Saloon in Burma mahogany and the special private cabin also in Burma mahogany.

=== Sleeping accommodation ===
A special feature of the First Class Lounge was an arrangement whereby the sofas at the sides of the vessel could be quickly transformed into 12 private cabins and so provide sleeping accommodation for 48 passengers. The three saloons on the Lower Deck, together with the two aft for the Third Class passengers were also fitted with sofas which could provide sleeping accommodation. Berth curtains were provided for privacy when the spaces were being used.

=== Lifeboats ===
The ship was issued with a Board of Trade Lifesaving Appliance and Safety Certificate, the appliances including 10 Class 1A lifeboats carried in Columbus davits, and teak buoyant seats and rafts for over 2,440 persons – sufficient for all passengers and crew on board. Electric winches were installed for handling the lifeboats.

== Launch and sea trials ==
Mona's Queen was launched by Mrs J. Waddington at 9:30am on 12 April 1934 in the presence of G. Clucas (Chairman of the Isle of Man Steam Packet Company), W. Cowley (director), J. Waddington (director), A. Robertson (director) and numerous other representatives of the Company. Amongst those representing the builders were: W. Hichens (Chairman), R. Johnson (managing director) and J. Caird (assistant managing director). Also in attendance were the Lord Mayor and Lady Mayoress of Liverpool and the Mayors of Wallasey, Birkenhead and Bootle. This rather unusual time for the ship's launch was as a consequence of tide conditions in the River Mersey.

Following her fitting-out, Mona's Queen underwent her sea trials on Wednesday 13 June. Sailing from Cammell Laird's, she made passage to the Clyde for her speed test over the measured mile, during which a speed of 22 knots (41 km/h; 25 mph) was attained. After the completion of this test a further run was made over the measured mile, with the vessel using the bow rudder.

A six-hour consumption trial was carried out on the way back to Birkenhead. On her return she crossed Douglas Bay (but did not berth at her home port) as she continued back to Birkenhead, where she entered the wet basin in order to have her turbines examined.

== Service ==
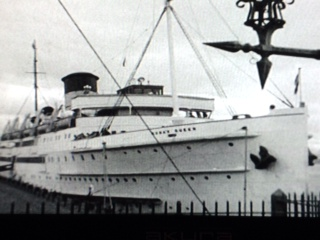
Mona's Queen pictured at the Pier Head in the 1935 film No Limit.

=== Domestic ===
Mona's Queen was the lead ship of the last three vessels – all twin-screw and geared turbines – to be built for the Steam Packet Company before the Second World War. She was painted with a white hull over green like the Lady of Mann and Ben-my-Chree. This was a summer colour scheme adopted by the company in the 1930s.

During the busy summer season, the Mona's Queen was employed on the main route between Douglas and Liverpool. It also inaugurated evening cruises from Douglas to the Calf of Man.

In the 1935 film No Limit, the Mona's Queen can be seen berthed alongside the Prince's Landing Stage in Liverpool just before it is boarded by the film's star, George Formby.

Fenella and Tynwald followed the Mona's Queen into service in 1937 (however, all three ships would be lost during the war).

=== Mail and cargo ===
Mona's Queen's designation as a Royal Mail Ship (RMS) indicated that she carried mail under contract with the Royal Mail. A specified area was allocated for the storage of letters, parcels and specie (bullion, coins and other valuables). In addition, there was a considerable quantity of regular cargo, ranging from furniture to foodstuffs.

== War service ==
=== Troop ship ===
Mona's Queen was requisitioned as a troop ship by the British government on 3 September 1939, the day war was declared. Although she served a military purpose, the ship remained a merchantman with a Steam Packet captain and crew. Most of May 1940 was spent evacuating refugees from Dutch and French ports as the massive German advance swept forward to the Channel. On 22 May she carried 2,000 British troops from Boulogne to Dover.

=== Dunkirk ===
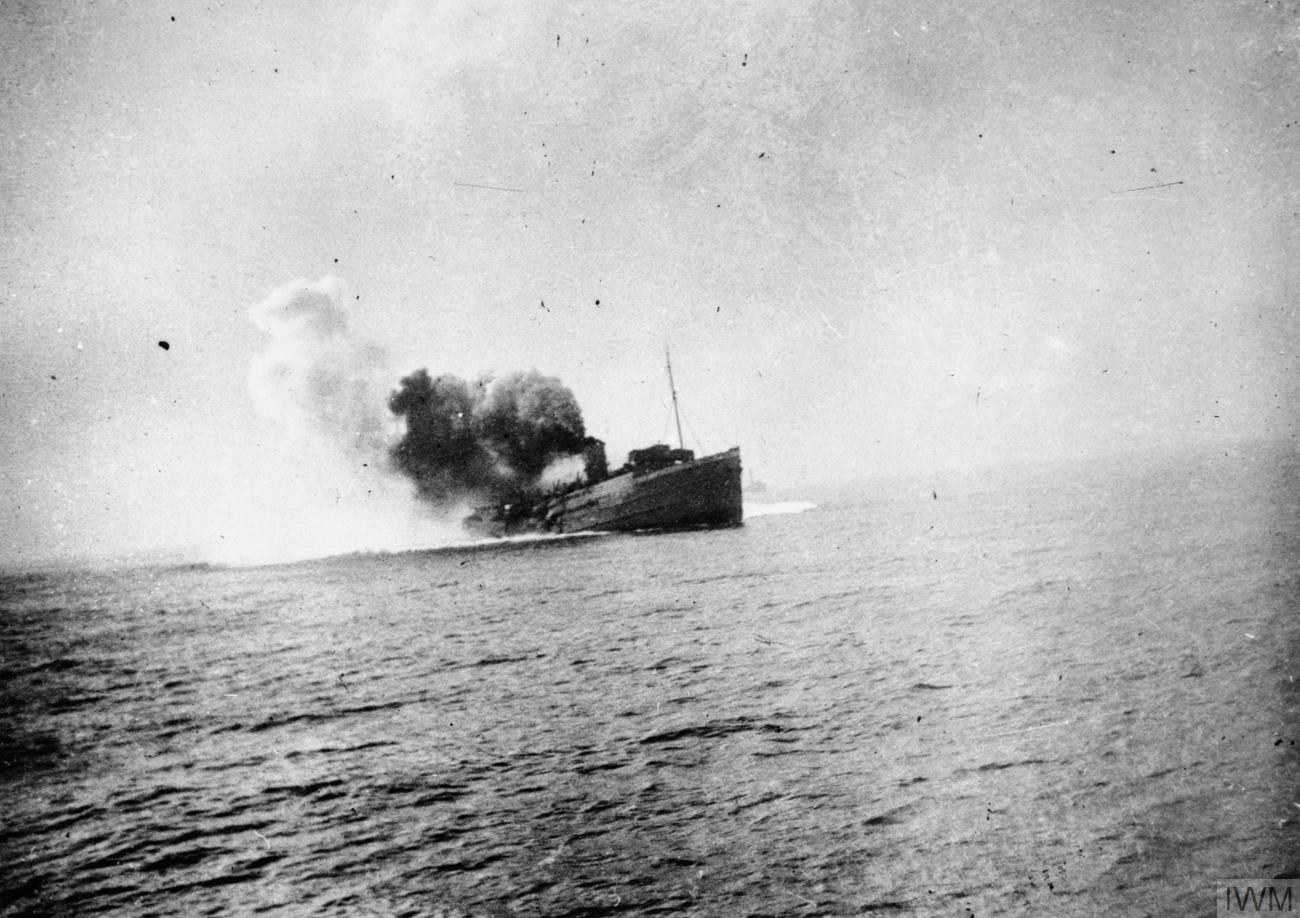
Mona's Queen pictured shortly after she struck a mine on the approach to Dunkirk, 29 May 1940.

Mona's Queen was one of the first vessels to make a successful round trip during the Dunkirk evacuation. Under the command of Captain Radcliffe Duggan, she arrived back in Dover during the night of 27 May with 1,200 troops. The next day the ship returned to sea and was shelled off the French coast by shore guns but escaped damage.

Captain Duggan was temporarily replaced by Capt. Holkham following which in the early hours of 29 May, the Mona's Queen set sail for Dunkirk from Dover loaded with water canisters because troops on the Dunkirk beaches were short of drinking water. However, the ship struck a magnetic sea mine outside Dunkirk harbour at 5:30am. The Mona's Queen sank in two minutes.

Captain Archibald Holkham, who had taken over as Master, and 31 members of the crew were picked up by destroyers. Twenty-four of the crew were lost. Of the crew who died, 14 worked in the engine room. They included the Chief and Second Engineer. Seventeen of the dead were from the Isle of Man. The wreck is designated as a war grave.

== Memorial ==
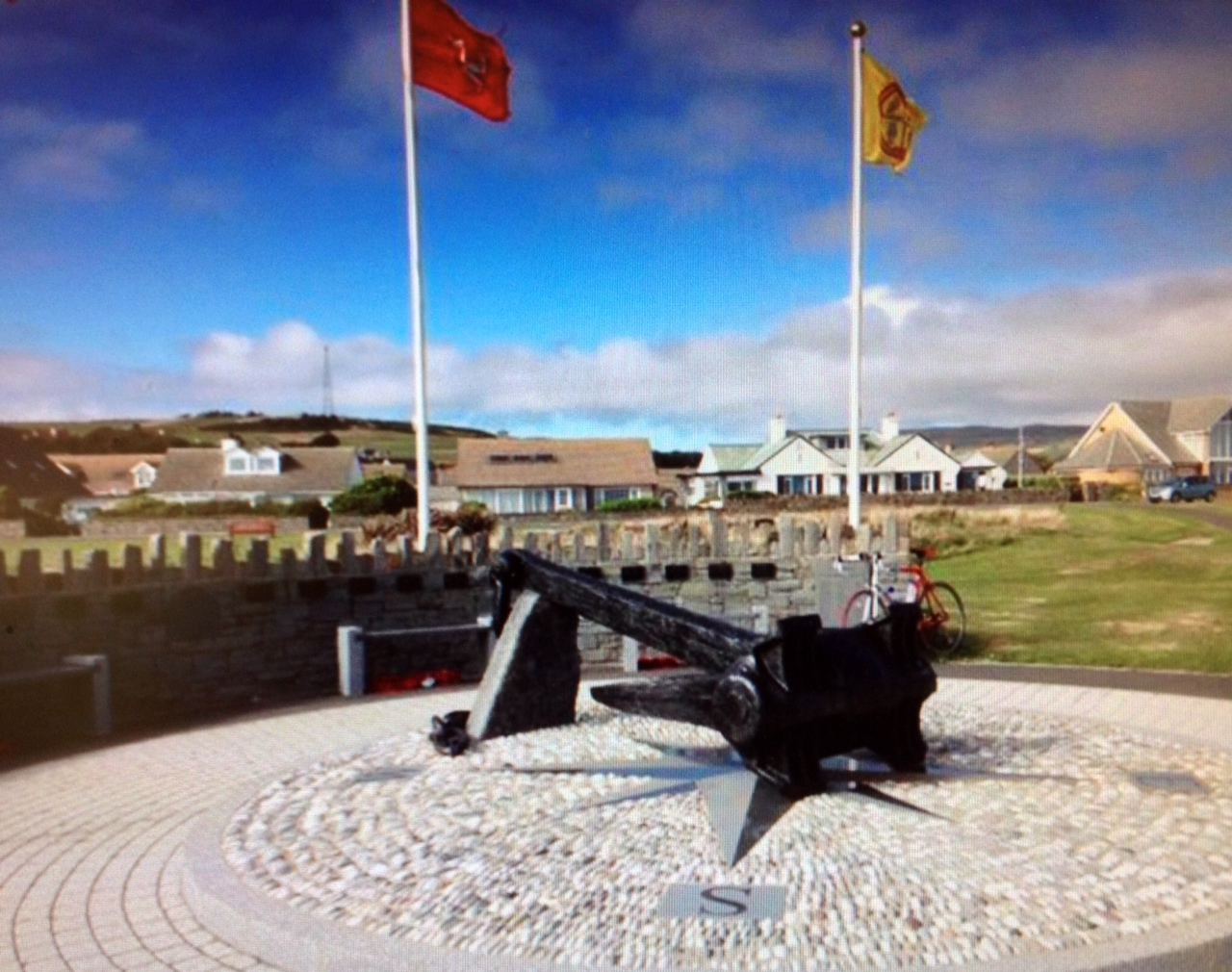
Memorial at Kallow Point, Port St Mary, commemorating the loss of Mona's Queen, King Orry, and Fenella.

To mark the seventieth anniversary of her sinking, Mona's Queen's starboard anchor was raised on 29 May 2010 and subsequently returned to the Isle of Man to form the centrepiece of a permanent memorial. The anchor had become detached during the sinking, and therefore did not form part of the War Grave. Her anchor was raised by a French salvage vessel, and was shown live on BBC television. There was a 12-gun salute from HMS Monmouth as a crane lifted the anchor of Mona's Queen from the seabed.

On 29 May 2012, a memorial featuring the restored anchor from Mona's Queen, to commemorate the losses 72 years earlier on Mona's Queen, King Orry and Fenella was opened in a ceremony at Kallow Point in Port St Mary attended by representatives of local and national government, the Lieutenant Governor, the Isle of Man Steam Packet Company and the French Navy.

== Notes ==
Citations

Bibliography

- Chappell, Connery (1980). Island Lifeline T.Stephenson & Sons Ltd ISBN 0-901314-20-X
