= SS Ben-my-Chree (1927) =

Passenger ferry operated by the Isle of Man Steam Packet Company

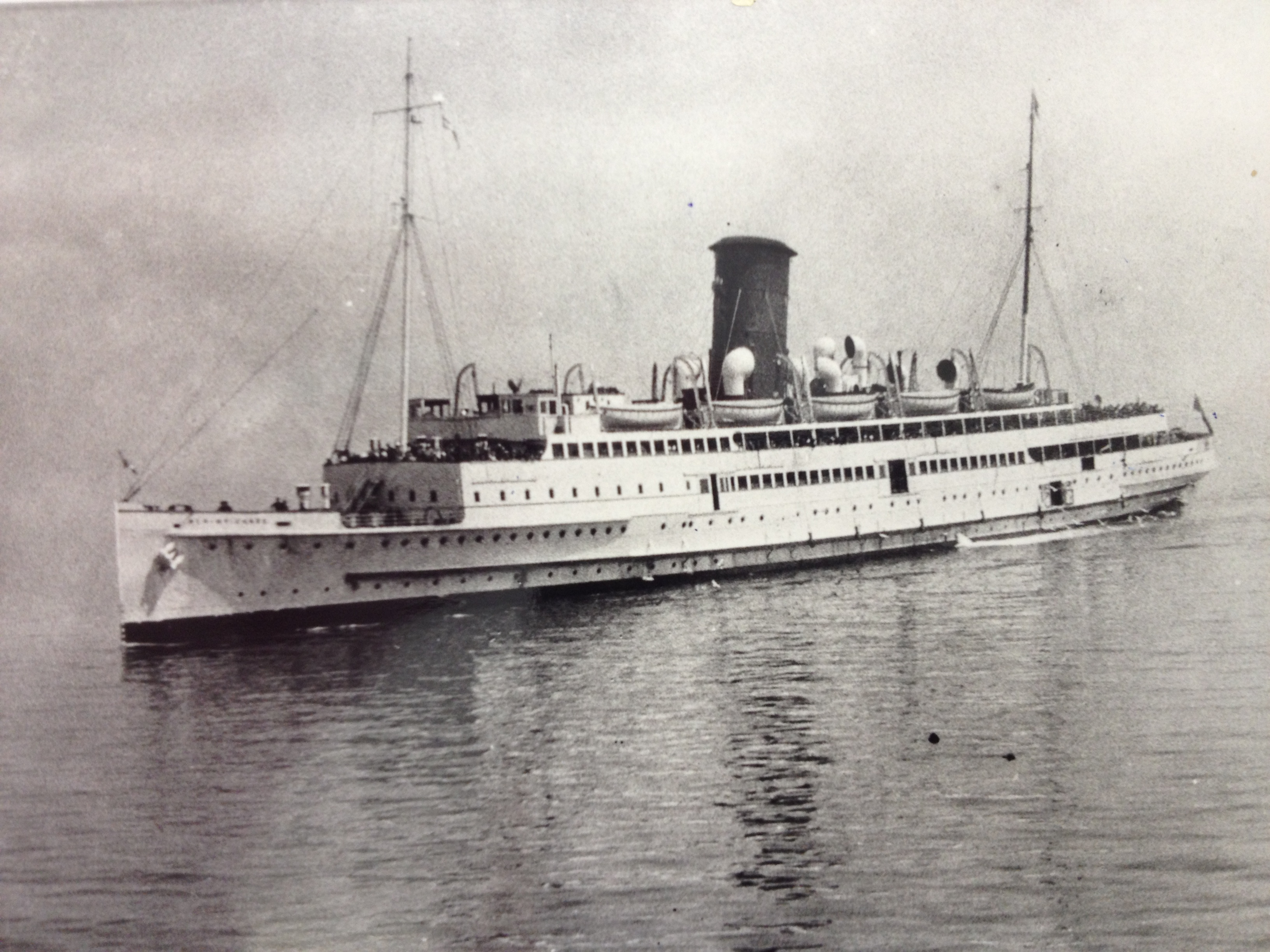
- Ben-my-Chree

History

Isle of Man
- Name: Ben-my-Chree
- Owner: 1927–1965: IOMSPCo.
- Operator: 1927–1965: IOMSPCo.
- Port of registry: Douglas, Isle of Man
- Builder: Cammell Laird
- Cost: £200,000
- Yard number: 926
- Laid down: November 1926
- Launched: 5 April 1927
- Maiden voyage: 29 June 1927
- In service: July 1927
- Out of service: 13 September 1965
- Homeport: Douglas
- Identification: Official number: 145304; Code Letters G N D B
- Nickname(s): The Ben
- Fate: Sold to Van Heyghen Freres of Antwerp. Taken under tow by tug Fairplay XI from Birkenhead Saturday 18 December 1965. Arrived at Bruges 23 December; for breaking.

General characteristics
- Type: Passenger Steamer
- Tonnage: 2,586 GRT
- Length: 355 ft 0 in (108.2 m)
- Beam: 46 ft 0 in (14.0 m)
- Depth: 18 ft 6 in (5.6 m)
- Propulsion: 2 × Parson's single-reduction geared turbines, working at 220 pounds per square inch (1,500 kPa), developing 10,300 shp (7,700 kW)
- Speed: 22.5 knots (25.9 mph)
- Capacity: 1st class passengers: 1642; 2nd class passengers: 944
- Crew: 82

TSS (RMS) Ben-my-Chree (IV) No. 145304 – the fourth vessel in the company's history to be so named – was a passenger ferry operated by the Isle of Man Steam Packet Company between 1927 and 1965.

Ben-my-Chree was built in 1927 at the Cammell Laird shipyard, Birkenhead. She was the first steamer built after World War I for the Steam Packet Co.

Upon the ordering of the vessel by the Steam Packet, a contracted cost of £185,000 was agreed. However, early construction was then held up by the long coal strike of 1926. Steel had to be purchased from Continental sources, and her keel was not laid until November of that year.

== Dimensions ==
Ben-my-Chree measured 2,586 GRT; length 355 feet; beam 46 feet; depth 18'6"; speed 22.5–24.5 knots. She was certified for a crew complement of 82, and had a passenger capacity of 2,586.

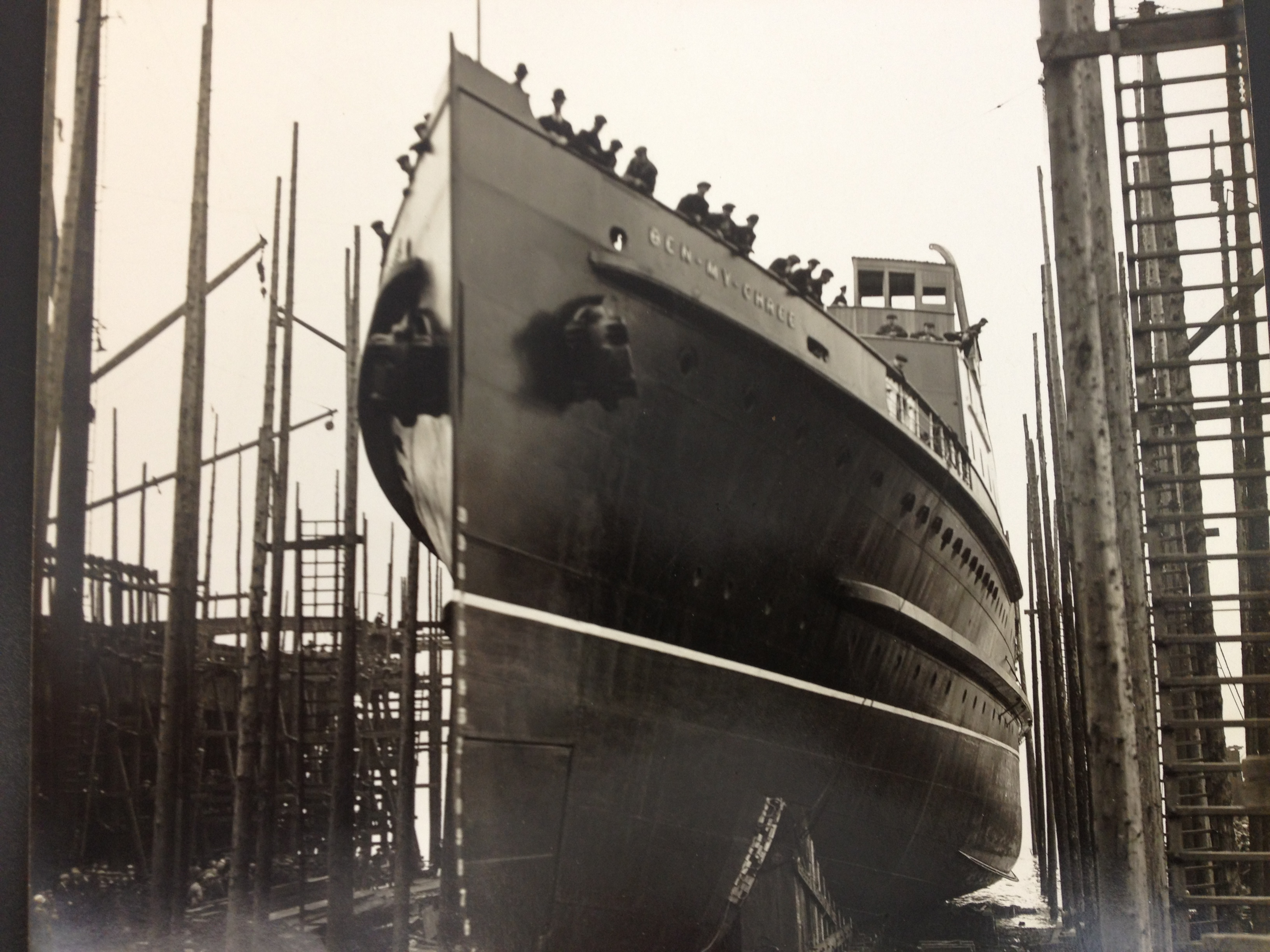
Ben-my-Chree is launched at Birkenhead, 5 April 1927.

The first vessel in the history of the line to be constructed as an oil burner, she was fitted with two single-reduction geared turbines by Parson's developing a total shaft horsepower of 10,300 shp (7,700 kW), with her working boiler pressure at 220 p.s.i.

== Pre-war service ==
Construction of the Ben-my-Chree was plagued by industrial disputes. Her builders were granted extra payments to meet overtime costs, and promised a bonus of £2,000 if they met a delivery date of 25 June 1927. Cammell Laird's met this deadline, with "The Ben" launched on 5 April 1927, and completing her trials on 20 June; making her maiden voyage on Wednesday, 29 June.

The Steam Packet Company, very satisfied with the vessel, paid £192,000, including various extras and then agreed to round up the figure to £200,000, which remained the final cost to the company.

Upon entering service, the Ben-my-Chree was widely met with high acclaim; her promenade and shade decks were partially enclosed with glass screening.

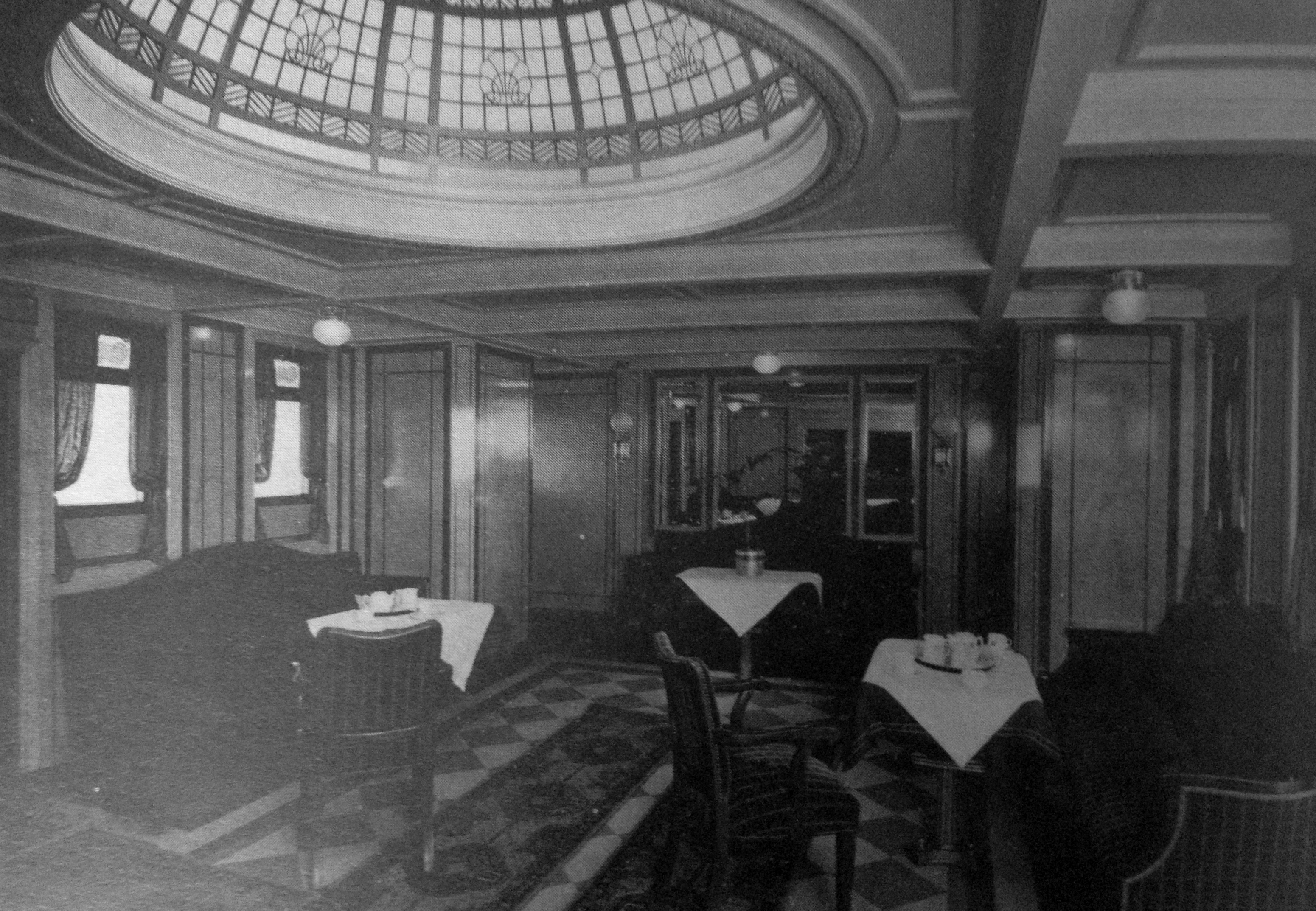
The Tea Room on board Ben-my-Chree.

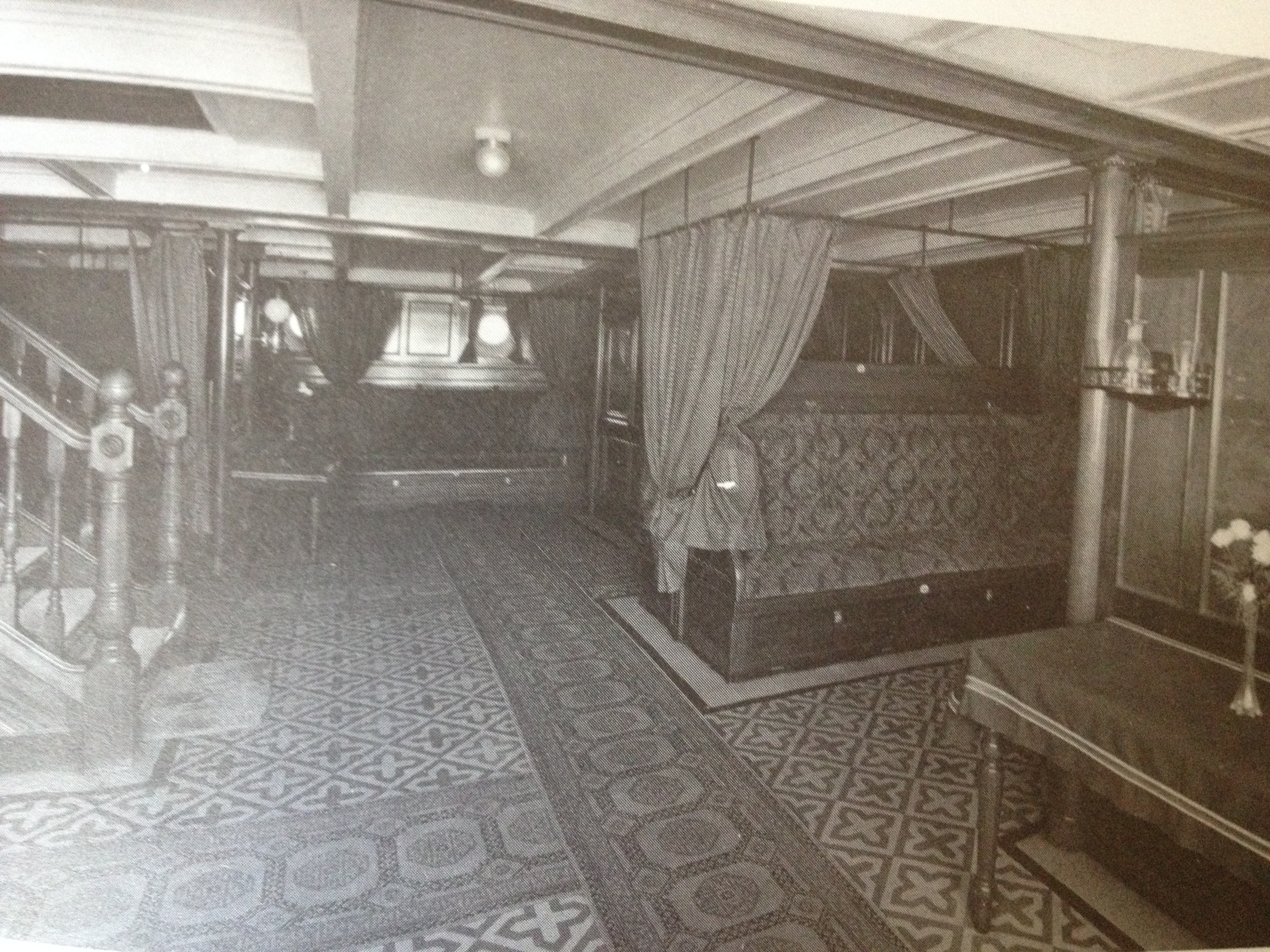
Sleeping Lounge on board Ben-my-Chree.

She was mainly used on the main home run between Douglas and Liverpool, and in service she regularly averaged over 20 knots between the Head and the Victoria Tower. Her average oil consumption on the route was 18.76 tons over five seasons.

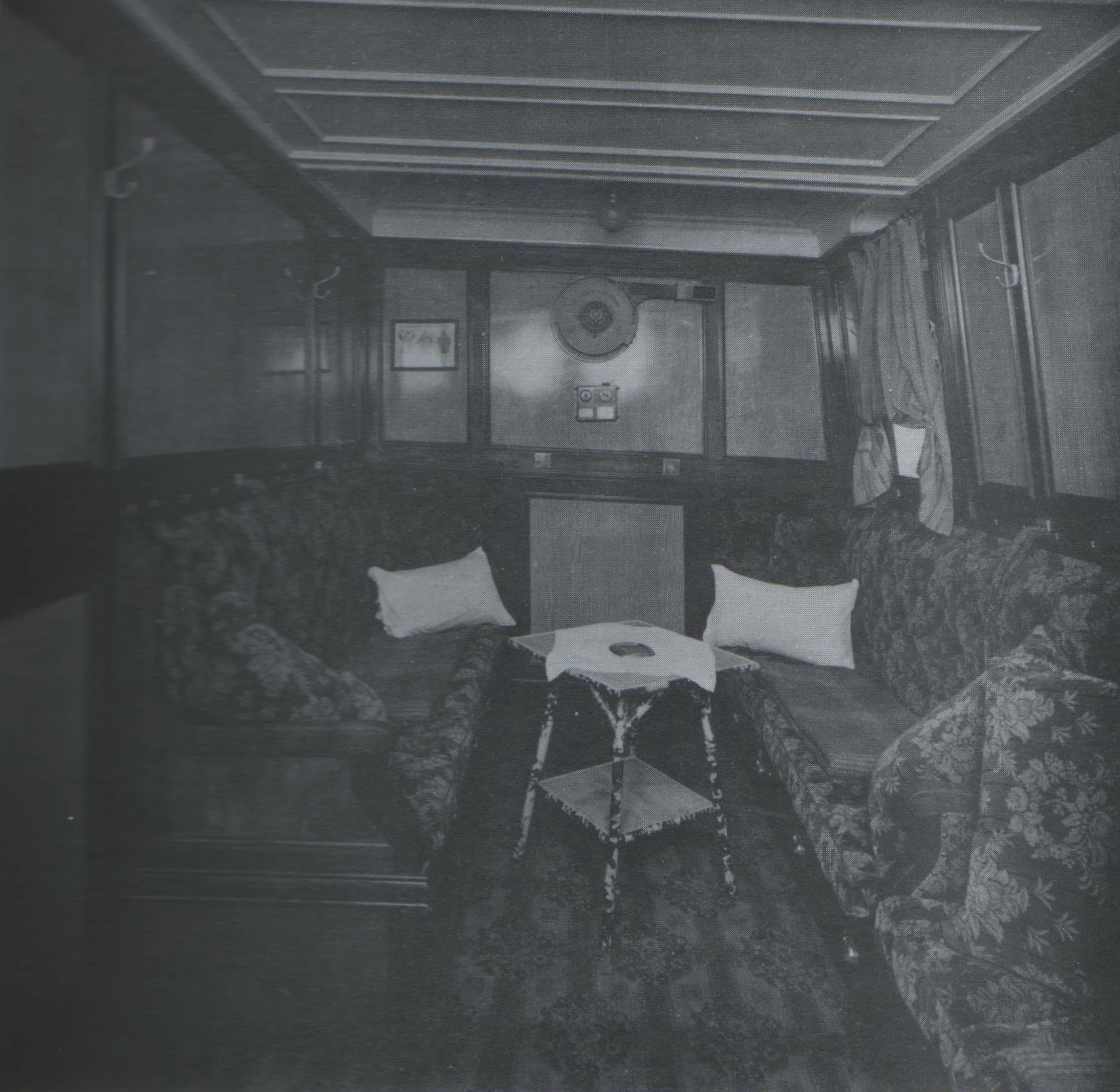
Ben-my-Chree's well appointed State Room.

"The Ben", as she was always affectionately known, was also employed on a series of Sunday excursions.

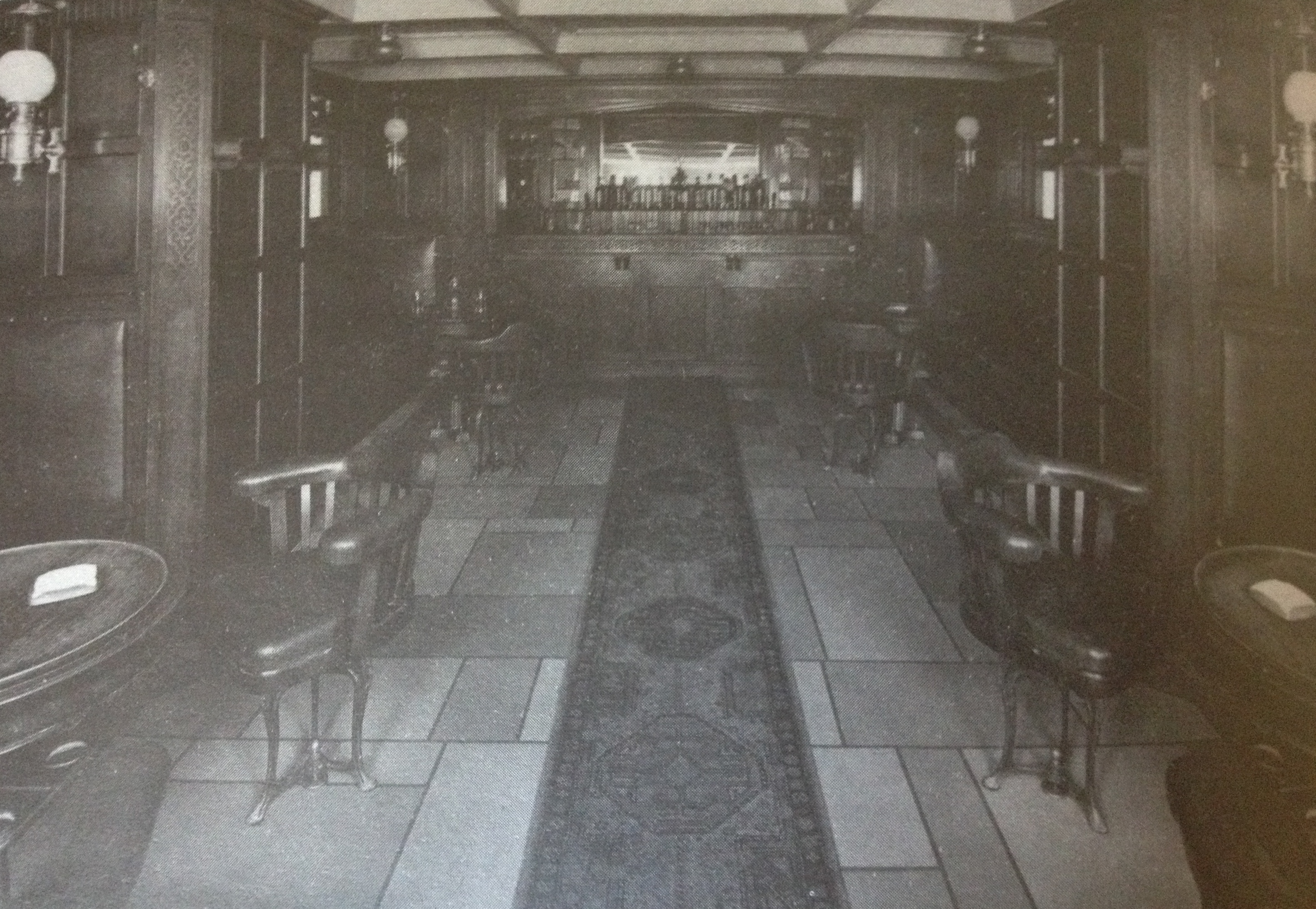
Smoke Room on board Ben-my-Chree.

Ben-my-Chree originally entered service in the Steam Packet's traditional black livery. This changed, when she was chartered by the North Lancashire Roman Catholic organization to take passengers to the Eucharistic Conference being held in Dublin in 1932. It was agreed that she was to be painted white with green boot topping, the work was undertaken by Vickers Armstrong for a consideration of £63. However the charter was not taken up because the sleeping accommodation on board the Ben-my-Chree was considered insufficient for the would-be charterers.

The Steam Packet Board decided to retain the colour scheme, as it was believed that white and green would have a definitive advertising value when the vessel was in the Mersey. The Lady of Mann was painted white for the 1933 season and the Mona's Queen was launched as a white ship in 1934.

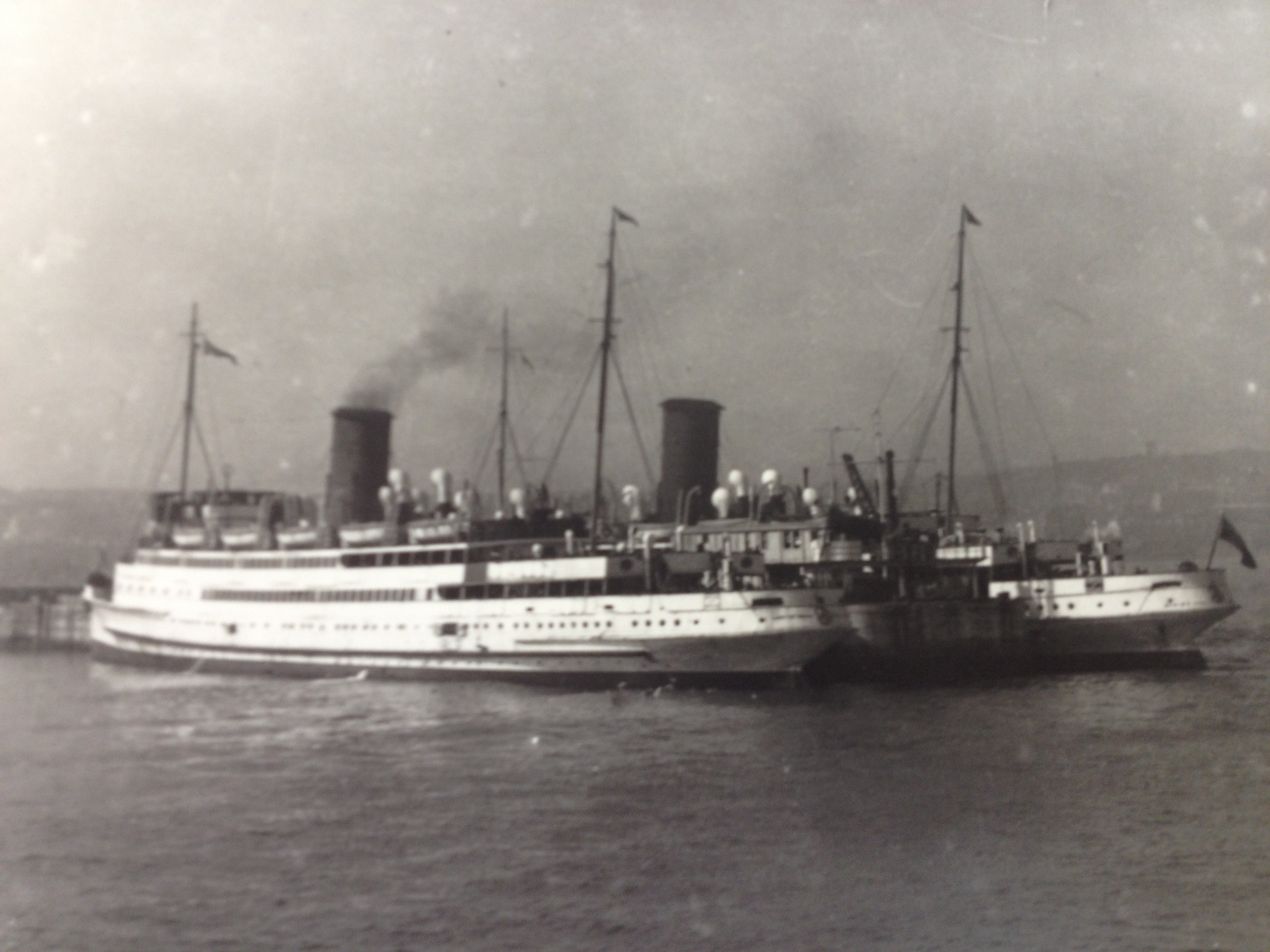
Lady of Mann, (left) and Ben-my-Chree (right) in company "summer livery", berthed at the Victoria Pier, Douglas.

This scheme proved very popular with passengers and complemented the luxurious interiors of all three ships.

The Ben-my-Chree was the first of three similar vessels built for the company between the wars. The second vessel was the Barrow-built Centenary Steamer, Lady of Mann, and the trio was completed when the Mona's Queen entered service in 1934. All three ships typified the style and elegance which was associated with the Isle of Man Steam Packet Company during the 1930s, and were highly regarded by both their passengers and crew.

== War service ==
Painted in naval grey in September 1939, the Ben-my-Chree was requisitioned and served as a personnel ship until she was released from service in May 1946.

Under the command of her Master Captain G. Woods, "The Ben" served alongside seven of her Steam Packet sisters during Operation Dynamo. She made three trips to Dunkirk, and rescued a total of 4,095 troops from the stricken port. Her only mishap was when she sustained damage after she and another ship collided soon after leaving Folkestone for Dunkirk, and this effectively finished her part in the Dunkirk Evacuation.

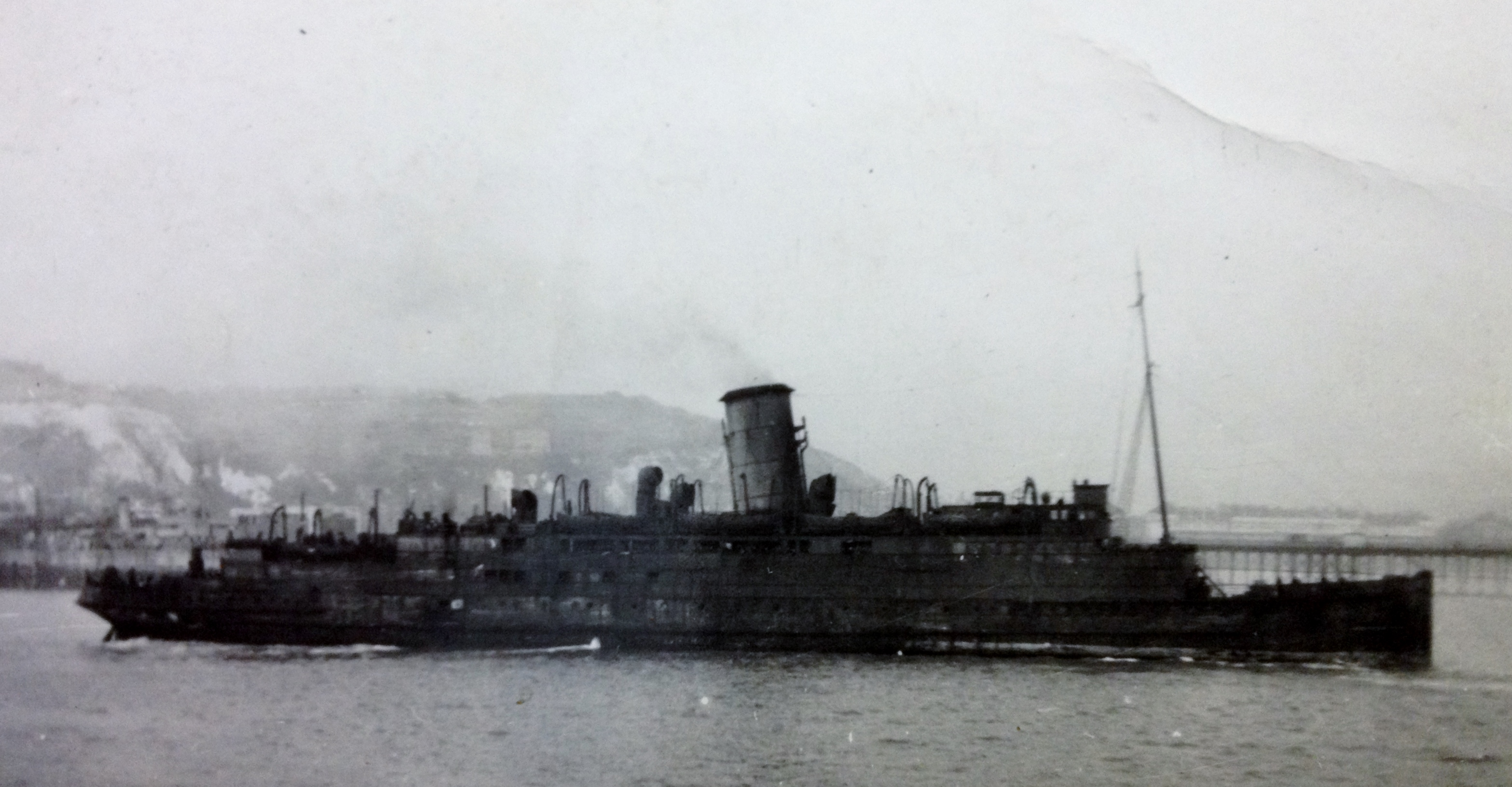
Ben-my-Chree pictured on wartime service.

Later she was engaged on trooping and transport duties between Iceland, the Faroes and Britain, plying from Greenock and Invergordon, usually in the company of her sister Lady of Mann, until the beginning of 1944. During this stage of her service, she gained a reputation as a very fine sea boat, and was sometimes able to keep her station while naval vessels around her were falling back in heavy weather.

"The Ben" made one trip from Skale Fjord in the Faroes to Iceland in May 1941, the week that the British battlecruiser HMS Hood was sunk in the area by the German battleship Bismarck.

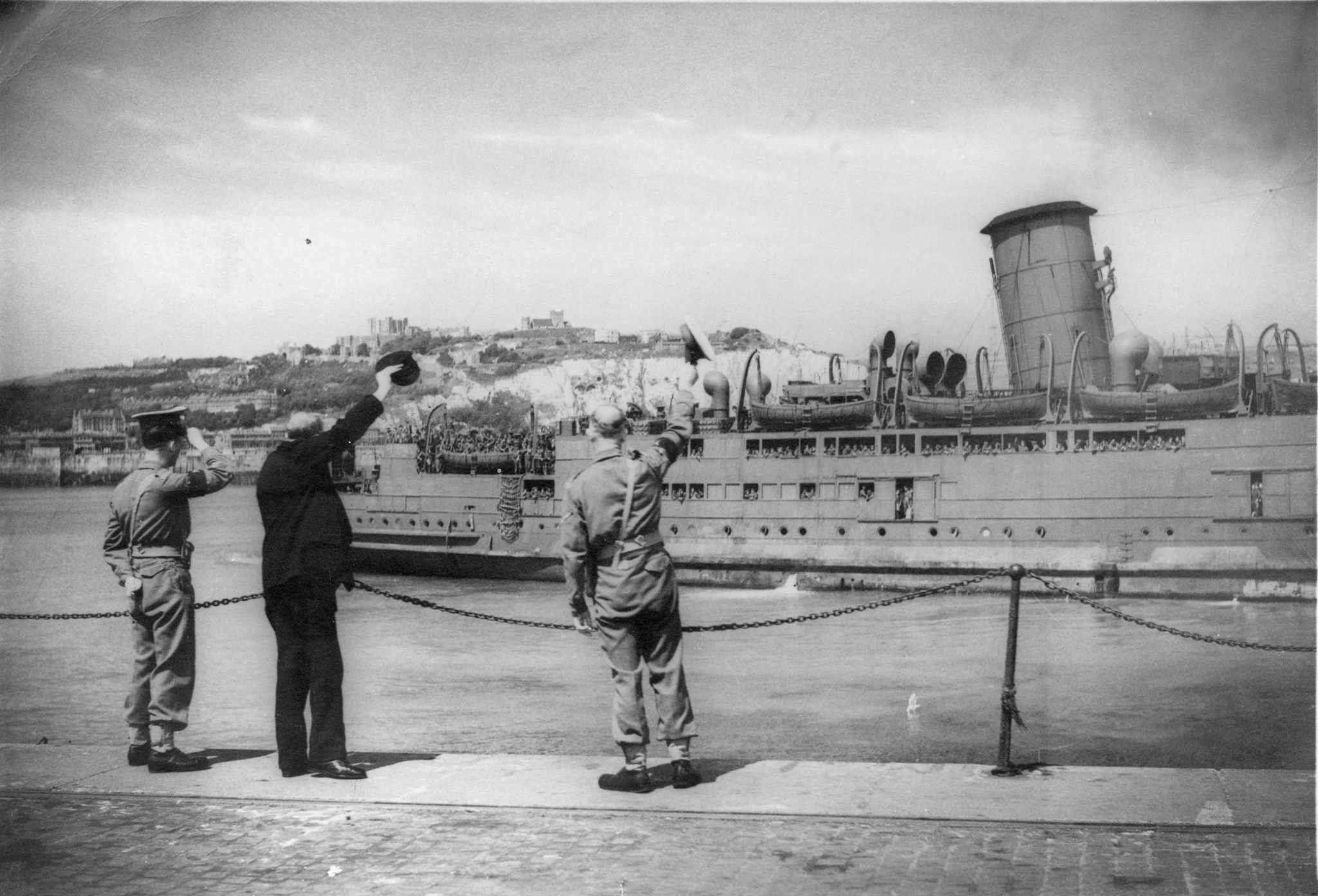
Ben-my-Chree pictured at Dover, 18 June 1944

Most of her war service had seen her based in Scottish ports which continued until January 1944, when she was moved to North Shields. Ben-my-Chree was then converted to a Landing Ship Infantry (Hand Hoisting) vessel with a carrying capacity of six landing craft assault, and after her conversion she made passage to the Channel to begin her preparations for D-Day.

On D-Day, 6 June 1944, as headquarters ship of the Senior Officer of the 514th Assault Flotilla, Ben-my-Chree and her landing craft saw action off Omaha Beach, landing American troops of the Provisional Ranger Group at Pointe du Hoc.

She then continued as a transport, until she was released for reconditioning in May 1946, and returned to Birkenhead in a very poor condition.

== Post-war service ==
Rejoining the Steam Packet Fleet, Ben-my-Chree returned to service with a shortened mainmast, a shipyard strike having prevented the fitting of a normal one.

A further re-fit in the winter of 1946/47 included the shortening of her funnel, the cravat being removed in 1950.

Employed only during the summer season, Ben-my-Chree continued to give reliable service to and from the many ports then in the company's list of destinations. Her remaining life was trouble free, and she continued in service until September 1965.

Her final weekend was a busy one, typical of the Steam Packet schedule of that time. On Friday 10 September, she sailed from Douglas to Ardrossan, then left for Belfast to take a charter to Liverpool overnight. Returning to Belfast from Liverpool on Saturday night, she sailed to Douglas on Sunday morning, and then made her last journey to Liverpool as the 01:00hrs from Douglas on 13 September, with 156 passengers on board.

After a long service she was laid up in Birkenhead awaiting a purchaser, until she was bought by Van Heyghen Freres of Antwerp. Ben-my-Chree was taken under tow by the tug Fairplay XI leaving Birkenhead on Saturday, 18 December. She arrived at Bruges on 23 December, for breaking.

== Gallery ==
Ben-my-Chree
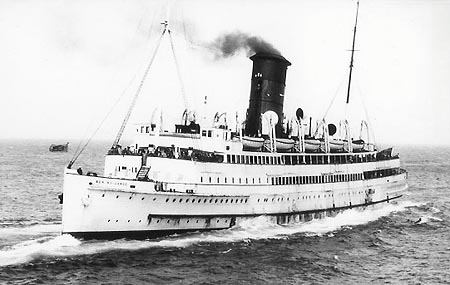
Ben-my-Chree in 1930's company "summer livery" departs Douglas.

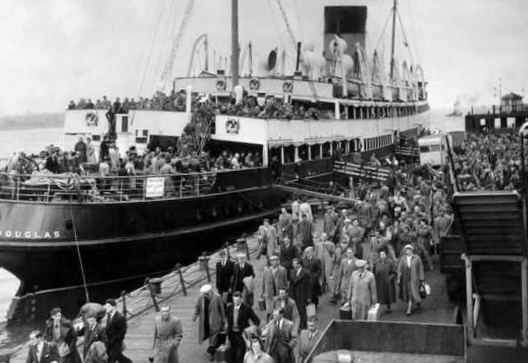
Passengers disembark from the Ben-my-Chree at the Princes Landing Stage.

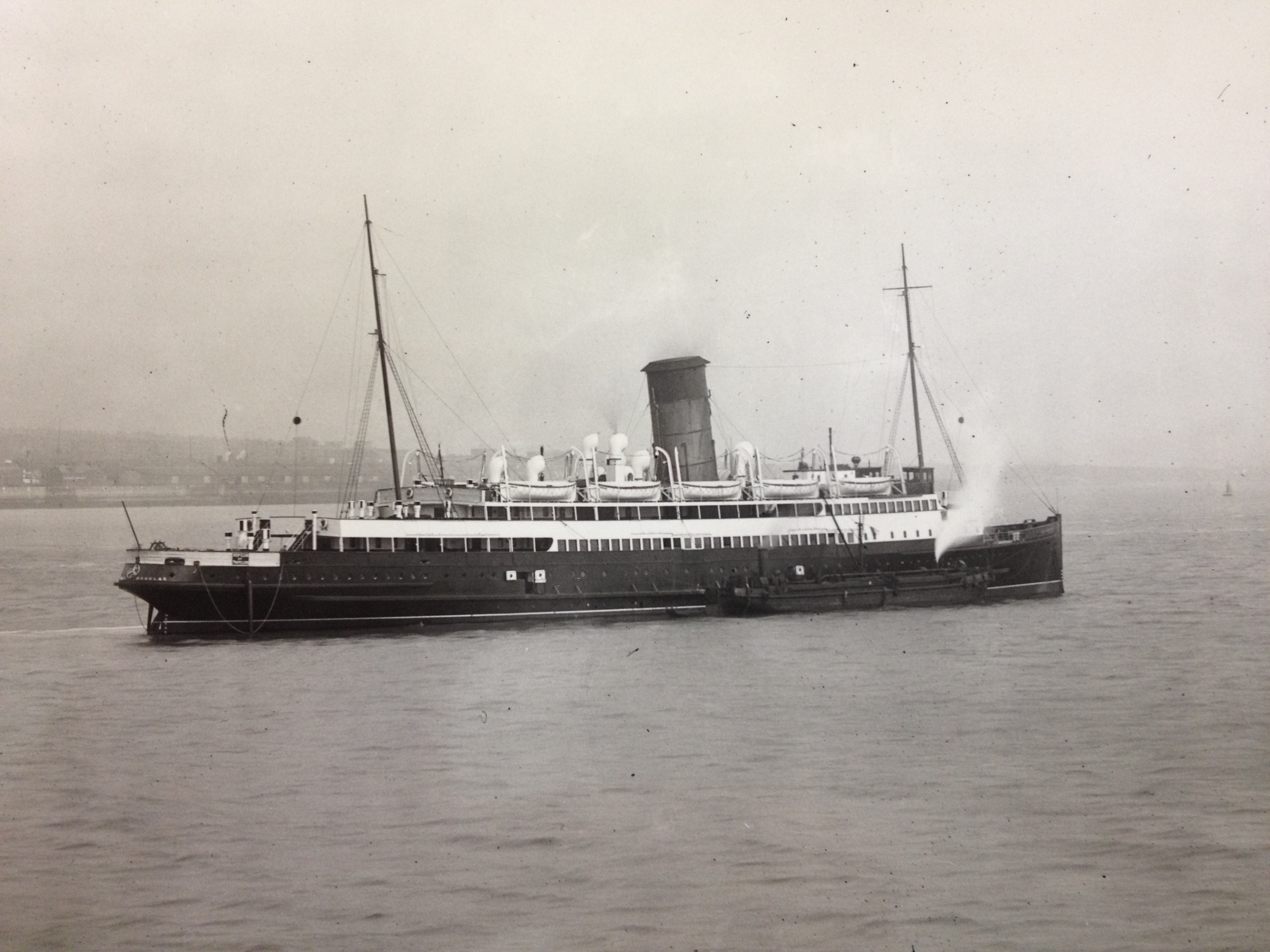
Ben-my-Chree pictured in the River Mersey.
