= RMS Lady of Mann =

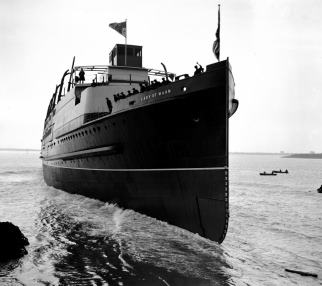
- RMS Lady of Mann is launched at Barrow-in-Furness

History
- Name: Lady of Mann
- Owner: 1930–1971: IoMSPCo.
- Operator: 1930–1971: IoMSPCo.
- Port of registry: Douglas, Isle of Man
- Builder: Vickers Armstrong, Barrow-in-Furness
- Cost: £ 249,073
- Launched: 4 March 1930
- In service: 1930
- Out of service: 14 August 1971
- Identification: IMO number: 5201893; Code Letters G M K Z
- Fate: Concluded revenue service August 1971. Sailed for Barrow-in-Furness, 17 August, to be laid up awaiting sale. Sold 14 December 1971, to Arnott Young and Co. Taken under tow by the tug Wrestler on 29 December, arriving at Dalmuir on 31 December, for breaking.

General characteristics
- Type: Passenger Steamer
- Tonnage: 3,104 gross register tons (GRT)
- Length: 372 feet (113 m)
- Beam: 50 feet (15 m)
- Depth: 18 ft 6 in (5.6 m)
- Installed power: Steam Turbine developing 220 pounds per square inch (1,500 kPa) 11,500 shp (8,600 kW)
- Propulsion: Four single reduction geared steam turbines working at 220 pounds per square inch (1,500 kPa), developing 11,500 shp (8,600 kW), driving twin screws.
- Speed: In excess of 23 knots (43 km/h; 26 mph)
- Capacity: 2,873 passengers
- Crew: 81

TSS (RMS) Lady of Mann (No. 145307), was a passenger ship, built by Vickers Shipbuilding and Engineering for the Isle of Man Steam Packet Company at Barrow-in-Furness in 1930, at a cost of £249,073. Certificated to carry 2,873 passengers and 81 crew, she was commissioned to operate on the Island's busy Douglas–Liverpool and Douglas–Fleetwood routes, and had a maximum speed of 23 knots. Her hull was at first the company's conventional black, but was changed to white and green in 1933, only to revert to black after her war service.

== Service life ==
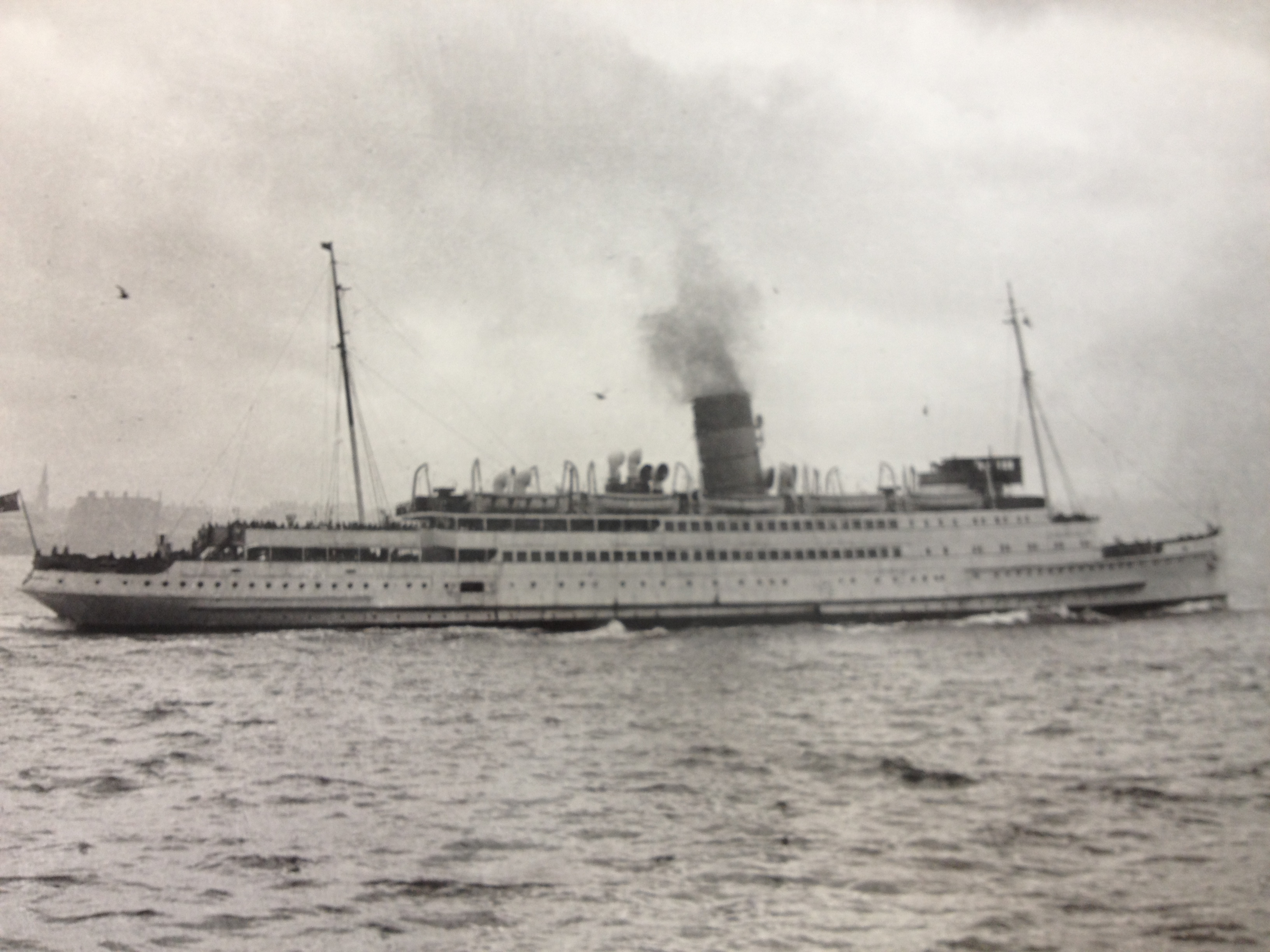
Lady of Mann in 1930s "summer livery".

The year 1930 saw the Isle of Man Steam Packet Company celebrate its centenary, and to mark this, Lady of Mann was to be the largest ship ever built for it to that date. The keel of Lady of Mann was laid on 26 October 1929, and by early spring the following year she was ready for launching. Lady of Mann was launched on 4 March 1930, by Katharine Stewart-Murray, Duchess of Atholl, the Lady of Mann, after whom she was named.

Lady of Mann Clyde trials recorded 22.79 knots, but her speed was often over 23 knots on regular service. She was driven by two sets of single-reduction geared turbines; 220 pounds per square inch (1,500 kPa), and developed a shaft horsepower of 11,500. The ship was oil-fired by cylindrical Scotch boilers.

Lady of Mann's general design and machinery followed closely that of the Ben-my-Chree, with the improvements gained by the three years operation of that vessel. Her initial work was on the Douglas - Fleetwood service where she took the place of Viking, and engaged on Sunday excursions from that port.

During the 1930s, like her sisters Ben-my-Chree and Mona's Queen, "Lady of Mann" was painted with a white hull over green. This was a summer colour scheme adopted by the company, and proved immensely popular with the public. All three sisters were exceedingly well appointed vessels, and upon entering service were each met with high acclaim.

Interior views of Lady of Mann

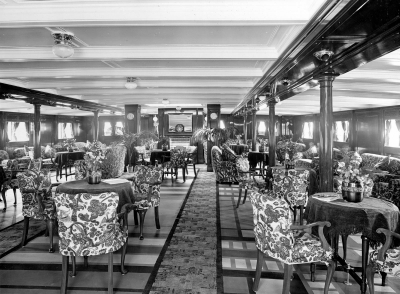
First Class Lounge onboard Lady of Mann

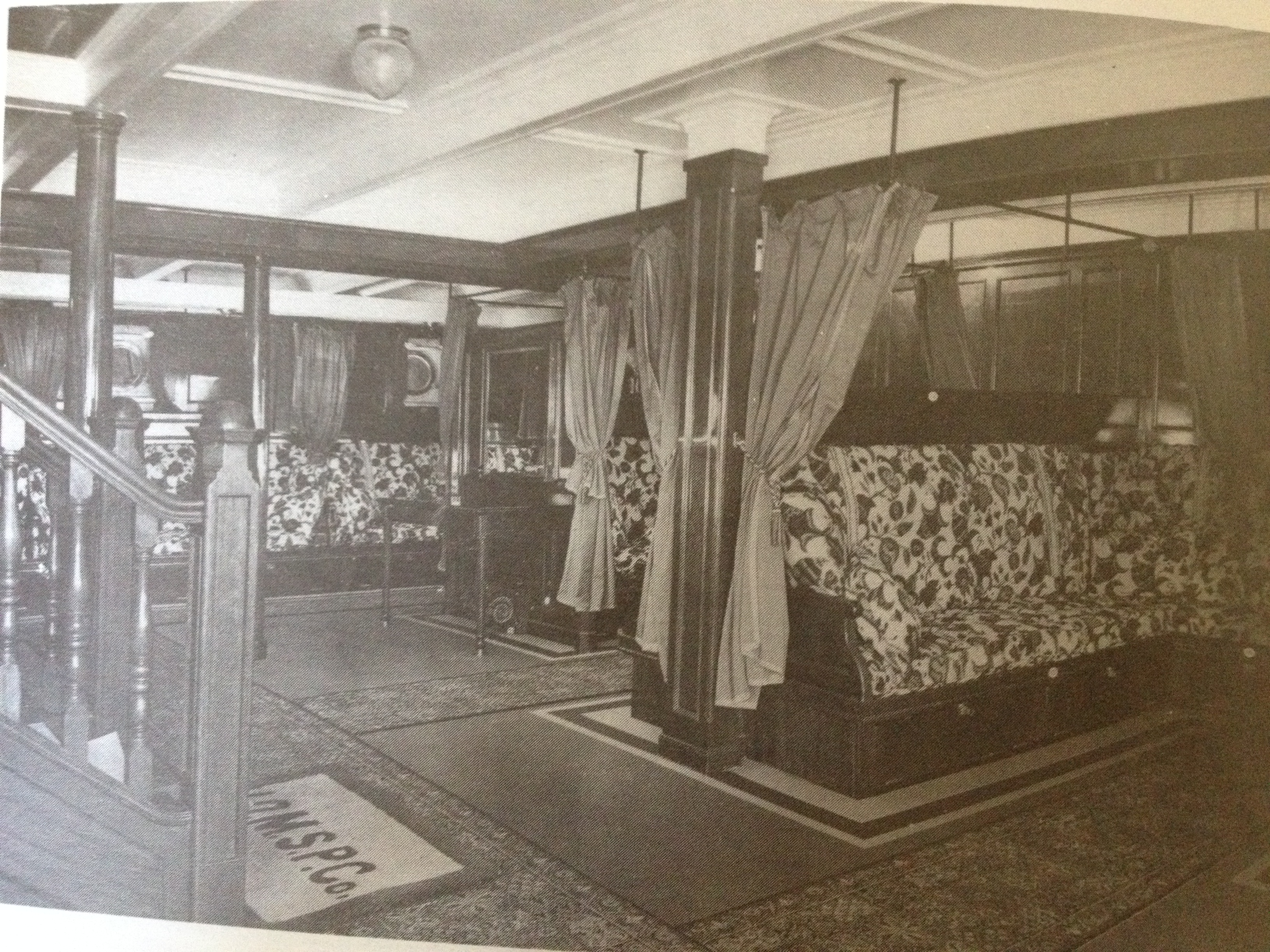
Sleeping accommodation

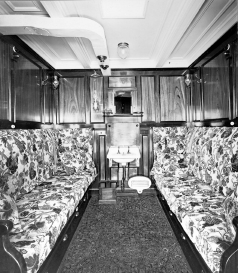
Private Cabin on board Lady of Mann.

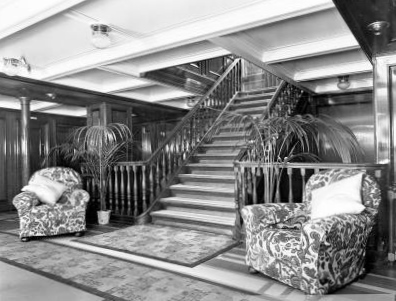
The main staircase on Lady of Mann.

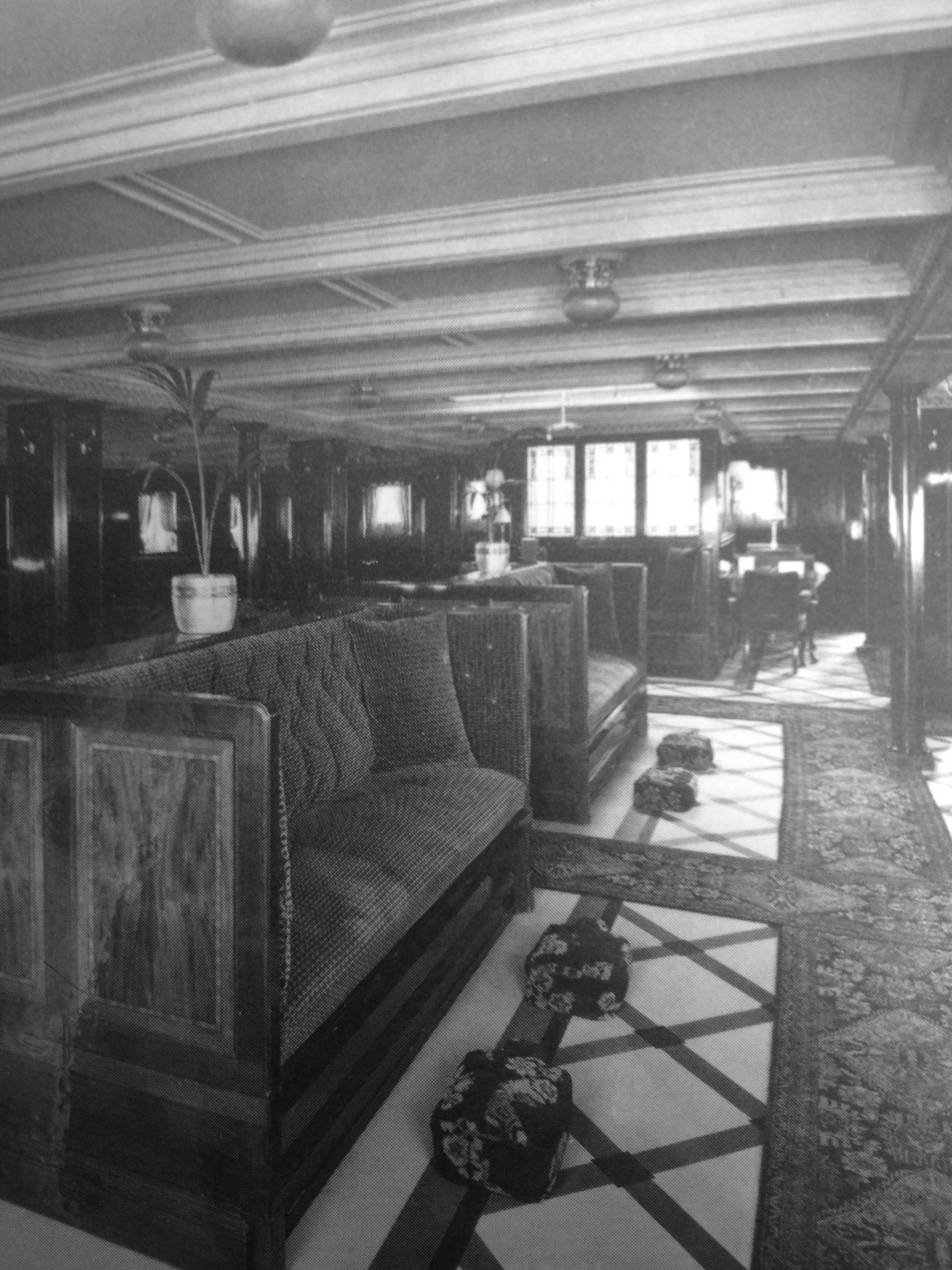
Lounge on Lady of Mann.

=== War service ===
Under the command of her Master Captain T.C. (Daddy) Woods O.B.E., Lady of Mann joined seven of her Steam Packet sisters at Dunkirk and then at the evacuation of the north-western French ports. After this she spent four years on transport work from Lerwick. She then went south and was engaged in the D-Day landings on the Cherbourg Peninsula.

==== Operation Dynamo ====
Requisitioned as a personnel ship at the outbreak of war, she had a good turn of speed, and was able to get in and out of the Dunkirk bombardments and lift 4,262 men back to the relative safety of Dover and Folkestone. She remained for six hours in Dunkirk harbour on 31 May 1940, despite having been damaged by shellfire from shore batteries on her approach and being bombed by enemy aircraft.

She emerged from the bombing with little damage and claimed one enemy aircraft shot down. She was back at Dunkirk in the early hours of 1 June and took off 1,500 casualties. The following day, 2 June, she again steamed into Dunkirk but was ordered back for lack of troops, as by this time the evacuation was drawing towards its close. She picked up 18 French soldiers from a small boat on her way back and landed them in England. On the night of 3 June, she made her last trip to the shattered harbour. She berthed alongside the East Pier at a little after midnight on the morning of 4 June, and left for England after embarking another 1,244 troops in little over an hour. Later that afternoon, Operation Dynamo ended.

Over the period of the evacuation, Lady of Mann had lifted more troops to safety than any other vessel.

==== Operation Aerial ====
Following Operation Dynamo Lady of Mann was in action once more. She became part of the force of personnel ships assigned to Operation Aerial, the evacuation from the ports of north-west France. She was at Le Havre, Cherbourg and Brest, embarking troops as the enemy advanced in a vast encircling movement. Along with her Steam Packet sister Manx Maid, Lady of Mann was one of the last three ships to leave Le Havre. It was estimated she had 5,000 troops on board as she departed under air attack.

==== Trooping duties ====
Another operation which the Lady of Mann was assigned to was that of ferrying forces personnel from RMS Queen Mary, which served throughout the war as a troop transport ship. Queen Mary would arrive in Belfast from Canada or the United States, turn around quickly and set off again westwards. Lady of Mann was one of several vessels that undertook this important task, taking troops on the final leg of their sea voyage to Greenock. Following her trooping duties Lady of Mann was then taken over by the Admiralty and converted to a Landing Ship Infantry (Hand Hoisting) vessel with a carrying capacity of six landing craft, 55 officers and 435 men.

==== Operation Overlord ====
On D-Day, 6 June 1944 as part of Operation Overlord, Lady of Man was the headquarters ship of the senior officer of the 512th Assault Flotilla, responsible for the landings in the Juno area near Courselles. Later in the month, while still on the Normandy operations, she was retired for repairs.

==== Personnel duties ====
and then went back to her duties as a personnel carrier. She served as such for the remainder of the war, carrying on for some months afterwards moving troops and bringing out displaced persons. She was mostly Channel plying to Ostend and Hook of Holland from such ports as Dover and Harwich.

Lady of Mann during her war service

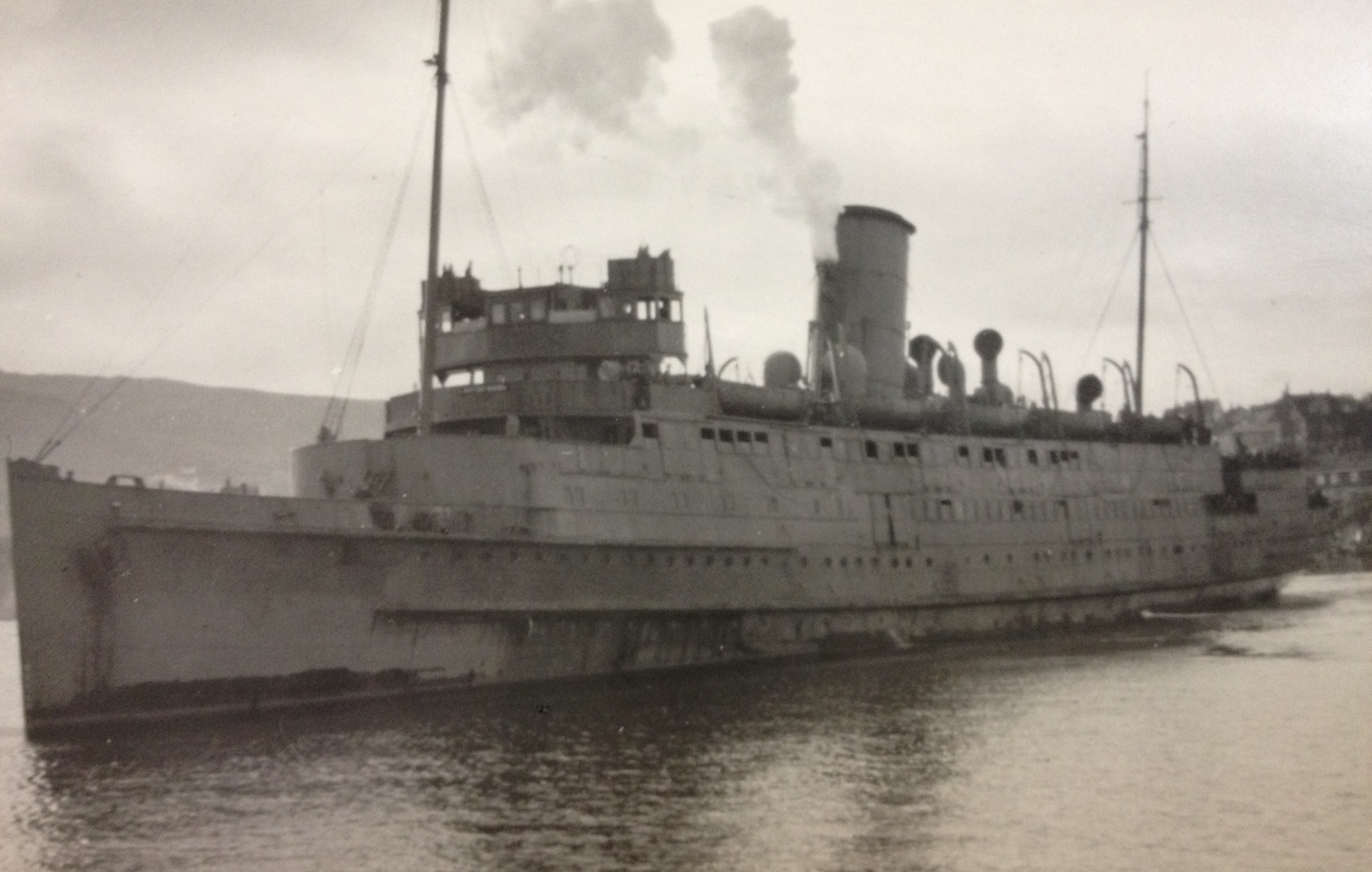
Lady of Mann at the Faroe Islands on war service

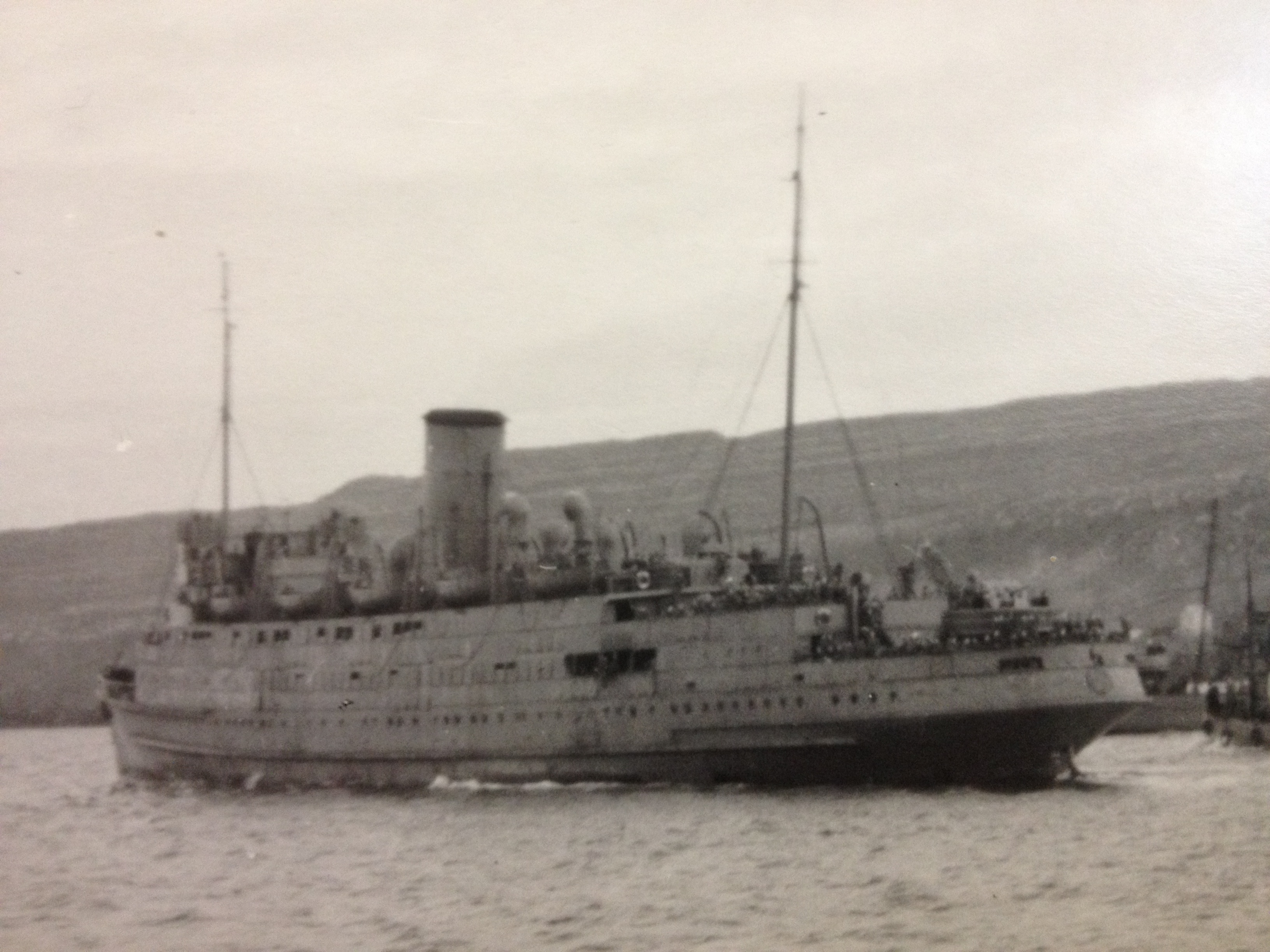
Lady of Mann departing the Faroe Islands

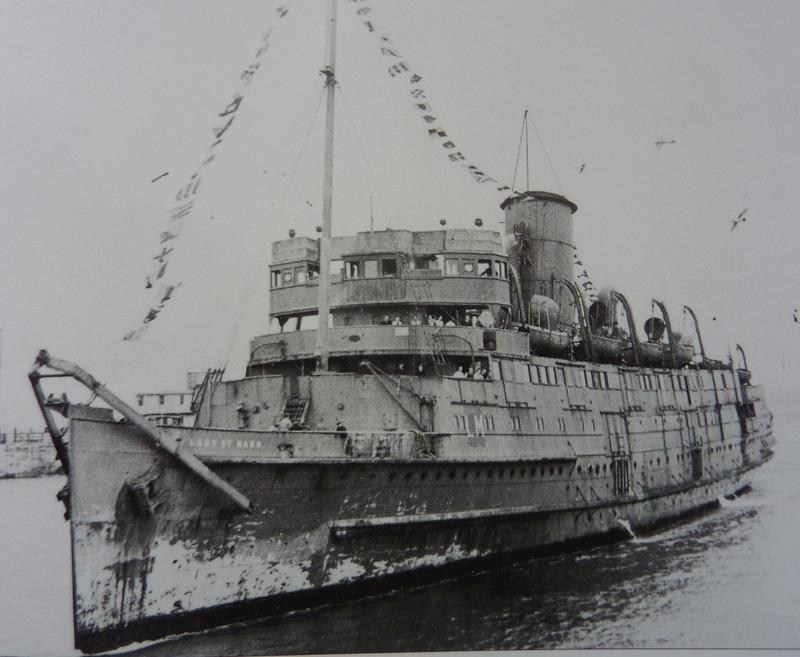
Lady of Mann returning to Douglas, 9 March 1946, following her war service.

=== Post-war service ===
Lady of Mann returned to her home port, Douglas, on 9 March 1946, where she was given a civic reception. A local paper that week said that during her war service Lady of Mann had carried more than 2,000,000 troops.

She was reconditioned by Cammell Laird & Co at Birkenhead and after her proud war service, Lady of Mann returned to her duties with the Isle of Man Steam Packet Company on 14 June 1946. Like her sister Ben-my-Chree, Lady of Mann only sailed during the summer season, and this may go some way to explaining their relatively long lives. Her career continued until August 1971. Lady of Mann made her final sailing from Liverpool at 09:00hrs on 14 August. In the afternoon she made passage from Douglas to Ardrossan, returning the following day, Sunday, 15 August. After a final day in her home port, Douglas, she departed bound for Barrow-in-Furness where she was laid up awaiting sale. On 14 December 1971, Lady of Mann was sold to Arnott Young and Co., Glasgow. She was taken under tow by the tugboat Wrestler on 29 December, arriving at Dalmuir on 31 December, for breaking up.

Lady of Mann was an exceedingly popular ship. When she came to be broken up, enthusiasts wrote from all parts of Britain hoping to get souvenirs from her. One of the most elegant features of the "centenary Lady of Mann" was her main staircase which was made of mahogany. It was widely admired, and was another example of the type of furnishing that subsequently had to vanish. Before the ship had finished her service life, the staircase was in contravention of modern fire regulations.

Alterations had to be made in the mid-1960s; the stylish opening had to be blocked in with steel walls, and steel doors had to be fitted. The appearance was largely sacrificed; the regulations concerning fire precautions duly satisfied. But when Lady of Mann was due to be broken up in the early 1970s, this much desired staircase was not quite finished. An enthusiast living in Castletown, succeeded in acquiring at least part of the woodwork, and it was reassembled at Lorne House in Castletown, where it remains to this day. Steam Packet officials affectionately described her as having been 'foreman built'.

For when she was in the Vickers Armstrong yards at Barrow, the builder was going through the very severe slump which followed the 1929 Wall Street crash. Most of the yard staff had been dismissed and only key men kept on. It was these men who built the ship, and a very fine one she proved. The name Lady of Mann was resurrected by the Isle of Man Steam Packet Company in 1976, when the fourth car ferry MS Lady of Mann joined the fleet.
