= TSS Manxman (1955) =

Isle of Man Steam Packet turbine steamer

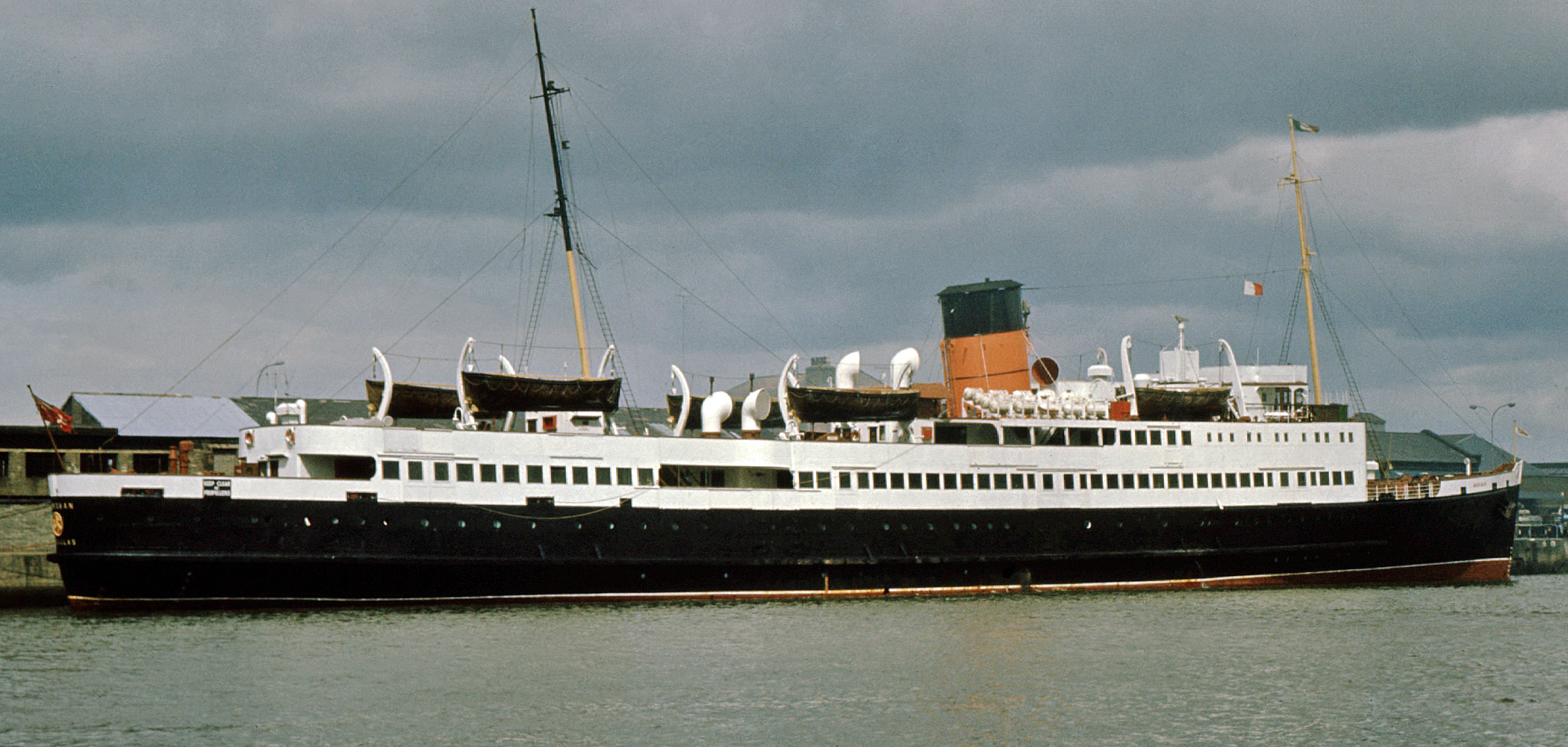
- Manxman

History

Isle of Man
- Name: TSS Manxman
- Owner: 1955-1982: Isle of Man Steam Packet Company
- Operator: Isle of Man Steam Packet Company
- Port of registry: Douglas, Isle of Man
- Ordered: 1953
- Builder: Cammell Laird
- Cost: £847,000
- Way number: Official Number 186349
- Laid down: 1954
- Launched: 1955
- Maiden voyage: 21 May 1955
- In service: 1955
- Out of service: 1982
- Home port: Douglas
- Identification: IMO number: 5219943
- Fate: Scrapped 2011/12

General characteristics
- Class & type: King Orry-class Packet Steamer
- Type: Passenger Steamer.
- Tonnage: 2495 gross register tons
- Length: 325 feet (99 m)
- Beam: 46 feet (14 m)
- Depth: 18 feet (5.5 m)
- Installed power: 8,500 shp (6,300 kW)
- Propulsion: 2 × Pametrada turbines driven by superheated steam at 350 pounds per square inch (2,400 kPa)
- Speed: 22 knots (25 mph)
- Capacity: Passenger and crew: 2,393

TSS Manxman was a passenger ferry launched from the Cammell Laird shipyard, Birkenhead, on 8 February 1955. She was the final vessel in a class of six similar ships, the Six Sisters, ordered by the Isle of Man Steam Packet Company, and was the second of the Company's ships to carry this name. She was withdrawn from service in 1982. Following a failed preservation attempt, and featuring in a music video in the process, the ship was broken up at Sunderland in 2012.

== Sister ships ==
- King Orry : built 1945, she was withdrawn from service in 1975 and scrapped in 1979.
- Mona's Queen : built 1946, sold for use as a Mediterranean cruise liner in 1962. She was scrapped in Greece in 1981.
- Tynwald : built 1947, withdrawn and scrapped in Spain in 1974.
- Snaefell : built 1948, withdrawn and scrapped in 1978.
- Mona's Isle : built 1950, withdrawn and scrapped in 1980 in the Netherlands.

== Design ==
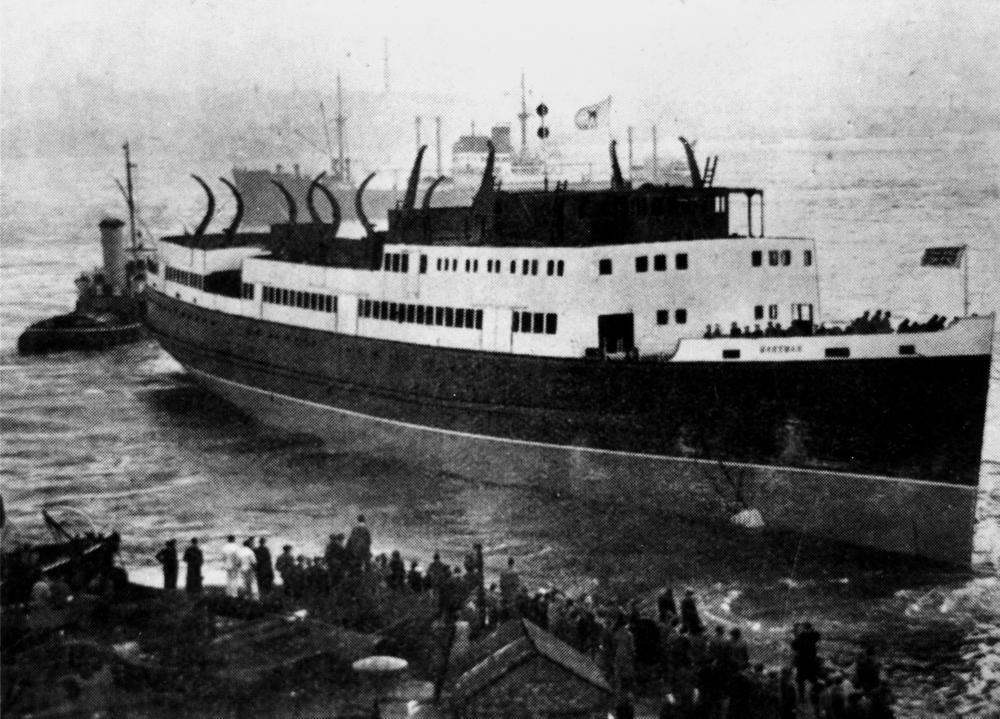
Pictured shortly after her launch, Manxman can be seen being manoeuvred into Cammell Laird's fitting out basin at Birkenhead (note the aft lifeboat davits, which differentiated her from her five older sisters)

Although outwardly similar to the five previous post-war ships built by Cammell Laird, Manxman had a very different engine room lay-out than that of her five older sisters.

Manxman was one of the first ships constructed to use the Pametrada design, in which the turbine rotor turned at 4,300 rpm. Double reduction gearing was used to drive the two propellers at 270 rpm. Her two steam turbines were driven by superheated steam at 350 pounds per square inch (2,400 kPa). This meant Manxman developed a normal shaft horsepower of 8,500 shp (6,300 kW).

== Operational history ==
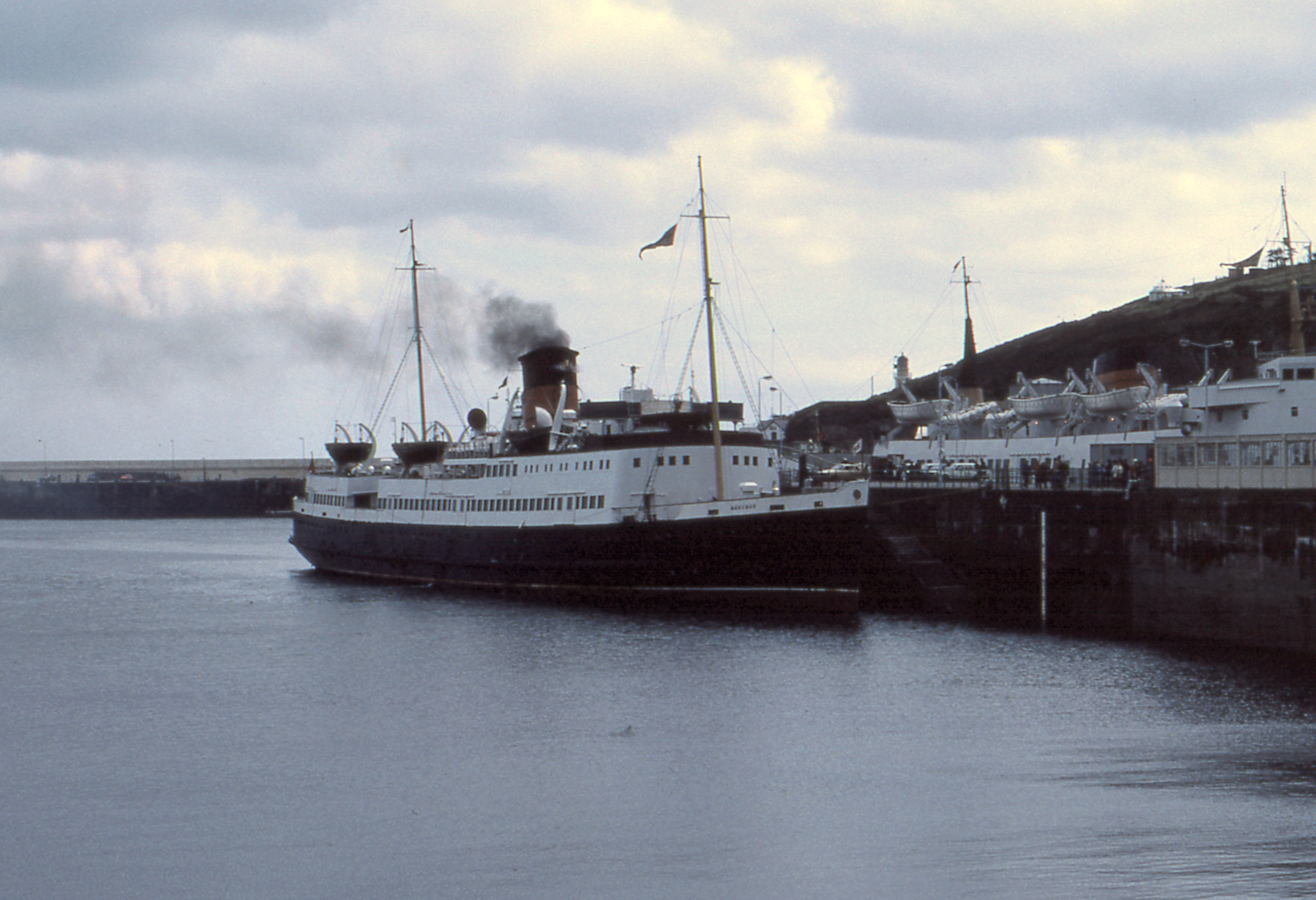
Manxman at Douglas, Isle of Man, August 1980

Manxman’s maiden voyage took place on 21 May 1955, with a sailing from Douglas to Liverpool. From then on, she plied the routes from North West England and North Wales to the Isle of Man and Ireland.

The Manxman was cast in the role of RMS Carpathia for the 1979 dramatic film S.O.S. Titanic.

In 1981, the Isle of Man Steam Packet Company made a pre-tax loss of £620,000 and it was announced that 1982 would be the Manxman's last year in Steam Packet service. Her first sailing of the 1982 season was a 23.55 relief from Liverpool to Douglas on 28 May.

On 19 June 1982, the ship had been chartered by the Liverpool Co-Operative Society, but this booking was cancelled at quite short notice. The ship was therefore offered to the Manxman Steamer Society, who instead ran a Liverpool to Douglas day excursion entitled Steam All The Way. On arrival at Douglas, passengers were able to travel by steam train to Port Erin on the Isle of Man Railway.

As the 1982 season began to near its end, Manxman began to attract increasing attention from the media, making appearances on both television and radio broadcasts, and in regional and national newspapers.

On 3 July, Manxman sailed from Ardrossan for the final time. This was followed by last sailings from Fleetwood on 15 August, Belfast on 27 August, and Dublin on 28 August. On 30 August, Manxman sailed 'light' from Douglas to Workington in preparation for a 10.15 sailing back to the Isle of Man. That evening, the return trip departed Douglas at 19.00 in foul weather. A Force 8 gale was blowing in the Irish Sea and it was not possible for the ship to berth safely in Workington. Manxman was forced to sail Northwards with over 1,000 passengers on board, and ride out the storm in the shelter of the Solway Firth. The ship finally docked at Workington at 09.00 the following morning, having given those on board a farewell trip they were unlikely to forget in a hurry. 1 September saw the final departure from Llandudno, and that evening the ship sailed light to Liverpool in preparation for what would be her penultimate public sailing.

At 09.35 on 4 September 1982, Manxman departed Liverpool with her last ever sailing for the Isle of Man Steam Packet: a charter to Douglas run under the name 'Finished With Engines'. Slipping from the landing stage stern-first, she turned in the River Mersey before heading downstream towards the sea. Long salutes on the ships whistle were sounded as she passed fellow steam packet vessel Manx Maid still berthed at the landing stage, and also with the small excursion ship Royal Iris. Further towards the sea she passed Mona's Queen, a little further on Lady of Mann, and finally Ben-my-Chree. Sailing into Douglas, Manxman was greeted by many small ships which had sailed out to greet her. Passengers were able to enjoy 5 1/2 hours ashore before the advertised 18.30 departure, her last sailing from the Isle of Man.

A dismal evening departure with drizzle and mist seemed to match the mood of many on board as Manxman left Douglas behind for good. With the Onchan Silver Band playing, and a flotilla of small vessels once more accompanying her, including a "guard" from Captain Stephen Carter and the tugs Union and Salisbury of the Laxey Towing Company, she set sail for Liverpool one last time. At sea, the weather improved dramatically, and she sailed under clear skies and a bright moon with the lights of North Wales and North West England visible on the shore. After arrival, Manxman was to be laid up at Birkenhead pending a decision on her future.

On 21 September 1982 it was announced that TSS Manxman had been saved from the scrap man, and had been purchased by Marda (Squash) Ltd. for a sum in the region of £100,000. The company intended for her to be the centrepiece of a new leisure complex at Preston Docks. Manxman was to be sailed there under her own steam, a final outing in passenger service. She departed her berth at Birkenhead at 08.28 on 1 October, sailing the short distance to Liverpool Landing Stage where she moored. On 3 October, with passengers paying £12.50 for a single ticket, and with beer on sale at 1955 prices (10p per pint), Manxman departed Liverpool at 09.07. She berthed at Preston at 12.45 and 'finished with engines' was rung on the ships telegraph at 12.48.

== Decline and scrapping ==
Following withdrawal from revenue service, and relocation to Preston Docks, Manxman's new owners intended to convert her into a floating museum and visitor centre. This venture was not a success, and the ship was subsequently developed into a floating nightclub and restaurant. Before moving to Preston docks she was used as a location for the film Yentl with Barbra Streisand. She also featured in a Granada series called Scramble with Richard and Judy (before they were an item) the show provided help to people setting up businesses.

Redevelopment of the Preston docks area once again made the Manxman homeless, and she was towed to Liverpool in 1991 where once again she was to be used as a floating nightclub in the Trafalgar Docks area.

In 1993 she was again moved, this time to Hull, being moored in the disused Ruscador Dry Dock. Here, a fire which broke out in August 1997 seriously damaged many of the vintage wood panels of the ship's interior and she was moved to the yard of Pallion Engineering Company Ltd on the River Wear, in the shadow of the Queen Alexandra Bridge in Sunderland, inside Pallion Dry Dock.

=== Preservation campaign ===
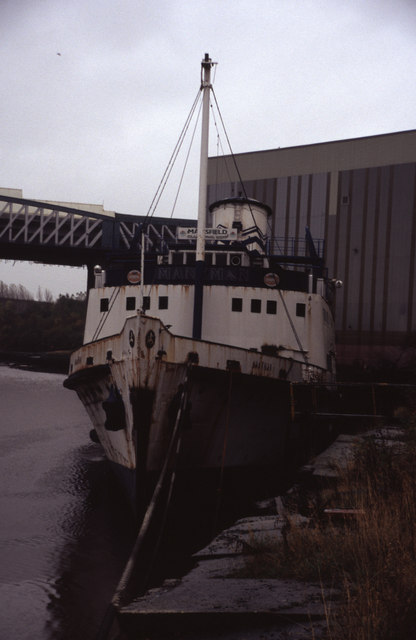
Manxman at Pallion Engineering, Sunderland

A preservation group, The Manxman Steamship Company was formed with the aim of securing the historic ship, the last of her line, and the last remaining classic British passenger turbine steamer. She was also the last surviving passenger ship constructed by Cammell Laird. A charity cruise on board the Isle of Man Steam Packet Company's Lady of Mann took place to raise funds for the Manxman. Several celebrities supported the Manxman Steamship Company, including Paul O'Grady, Tom O'Connor and Ken Dodd.

The ship continued to deteriorate, including from theft of components and a fire which seriously damaged much of the interior woodwork. The preservation campaign was ultimately unsuccessful. It was announced in March 2010 that Manxman was to be dismantled in Pallion shipyard. By January 2011, the ship was being decommissioned and dismantled by G O'Brien & Sons, a specialist heavy industrial and marine demolition company. The dismantling took place in a large dry dock in the Pallion shipyard, Sunderland. The ship was finally broken up for scrap in 2012.

Whilst this process was being undertaken the dry dock and ship were used as a backdrop for a music video entitled “Pallion” featuring Lanterns on the Lake as part of the Northern Film + Media “Space Invasion” project. Newcastle-based Lanterns on the Lake and visual artists Novak Collective were jointly commissioned to create an audio and visual response to what was described as “The ghost ship” the TSS Manxman. “Pallion” was described as telling the story of the historic vessel and once thriving shipbuilding yard.

== Technical specifications ==
- Boiler: 2 × Babcock & Wilcox water tube boilers.
- Operating boiler pressure: 340 p.s.i.
- Main engines: 2 × Pametrada steam turbines, each developing 4,250 s.h.p.
- Rotor speed: 4290 r.p.m.
- Gearing: Double reduction.
- Propeller speed: 275 r.p.m.
- Passenger certificate:
  - 1955: 1,049 first class and 1,344 third class (2,393 total)
  - 1967: 2,032 (single class) with 60 crew

During sea trials on the River Clyde on 12 May 1955, TSS Manxman achieved the speed of 21.95 knots (25.26 mph) in what was known as the "Skermorlie Mile"
