= RMS Manx Maid =

RMS Manx Maid may refer to two ships of the Isle of Man Steam Packet Company:

- SS Manx Maid (1910)
- TSS Manx Maid (1962)
