= TSS Manx Maid =

There have been two ships named TSS Manx Maid:

- TSS Manx Maid (1910), a packet steamer initially operated by the London and Southwestern Railway Company under the name Caesarea
- TSS Manx Maid (1962), the first car ferry operated by the Isle of Man Steam Packet Company
