= Ship's salute =

A Ship's Salute is a gesture or other action used to display respect. Salutes are primarily associated with armed forces, but other organizations and civil people also use salutes. Such a salute in terms of maritime connotations, usually involves the entering into, or retirement from, service, of civilian or military personnel; a vessel, or aircraft.

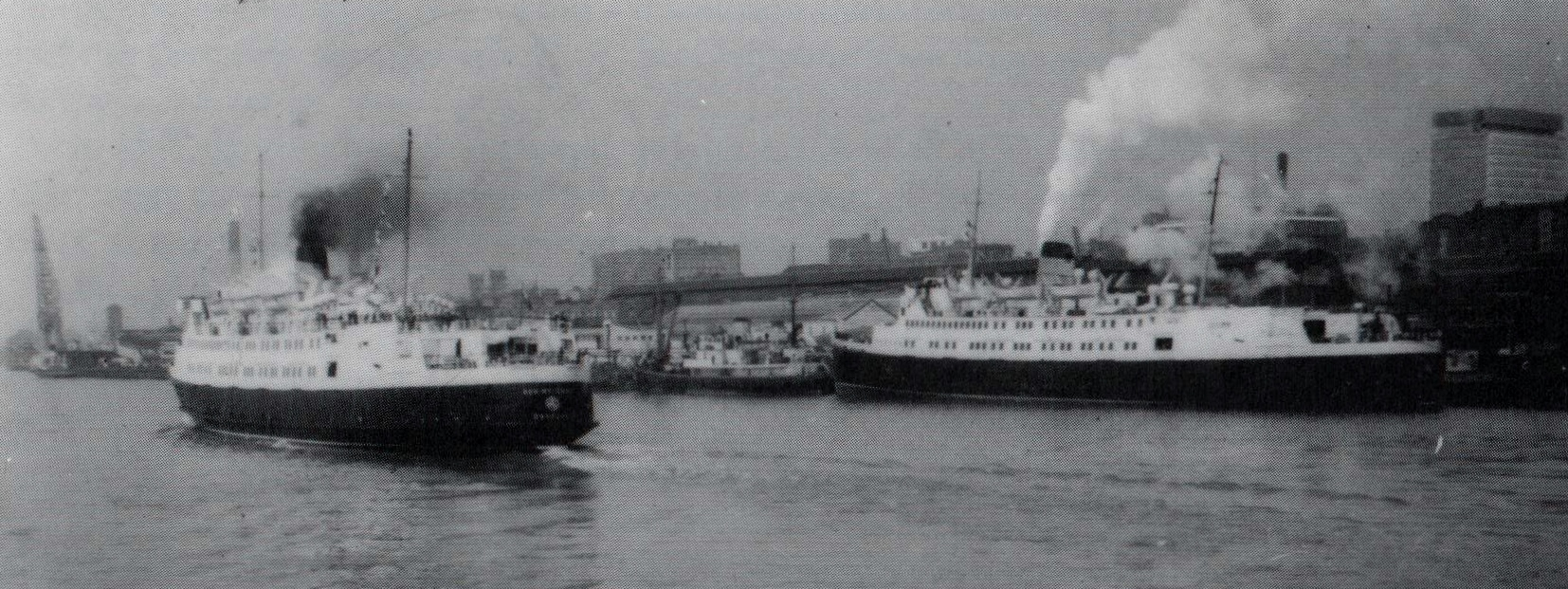
RMS Ben-my-Chree (left) receives a rousing salute from her older sister RMS Manx Maid (right) as she makes her way down the River Mersey for her Maiden Voyage from Liverpool to Douglas, May 12th, 1966.

== See also ==
- Sail-by salute
- Salvo – Simultaneous discharge of weaponry
