= MV Mona's Queen =

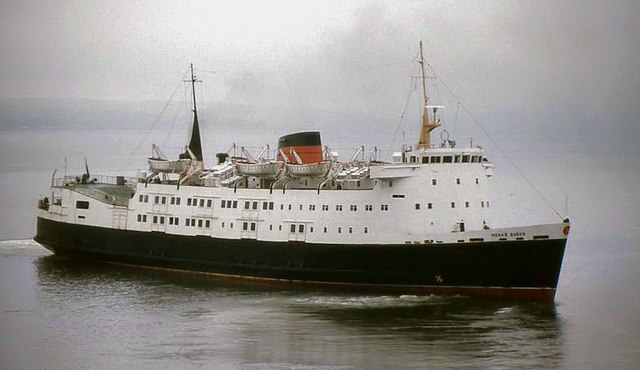
- Mona's Queen approaches Stranraer

History
- Name: 1972: Mona's Queen (V); 1995: Mary the Queen
- Owner: 1972: IOMSPCo.
- Port of registry: Douglas, Isle of Man
- Builder: Ailsa Shipbuilding Company, Troon
- Cost: £2,100,000
- Yard number: 533
- Way number: 307621
- Launched: 22 December 1971
- In service: June 1972
- Identification: IMO number: 7127493; Official Number 307621; Code Letters G P O W; Callsign: DUA2616
- Fate: Sold to the Philippines

Philippines
- Name: 1995–2008: M/V Mary the Queen
- Owner: MBRS Lines
- Port of registry: Philippines
- In service: 1995
- Out of service: 2008
- Fate: Sold for scrap, 1 September 2008

General characteristics
- Class & type: Car ferry
- Tonnage: 2,998 GRT; 540 DWT
- Length: 104.45 m (342.7 ft)
- Beam: 52 ft (16 m)
- Depth: 17.5 ft (5.3 m)
- Installed power: 2x 10-cylinder P.C.2 Crossley Pielstick diesel engines 10,000 shp (7,500 kW)
- Propulsion: variable-pitch propellers
- Speed: 21 knots (39 km/h)
- Capacity: 1600 passengers and approximately 100 vehicles
- Crew: 55

MV (RMS) Mona's Queen (V) Official No. 307621 was a car-ferry built in 1971–72 for the Isle of Man Steam Packet Company. From 1972 to 1990, she operated to and from Douglas, Isle of Man. After a lengthy lay-up, she was sold in 1995, renamed Mary the Queen and operated as a ferry in south-east Asia, mainly sailing between Manila and Boracay. She was sold to Indian shipbreakers and beached in 2008.

== Construction and design ==
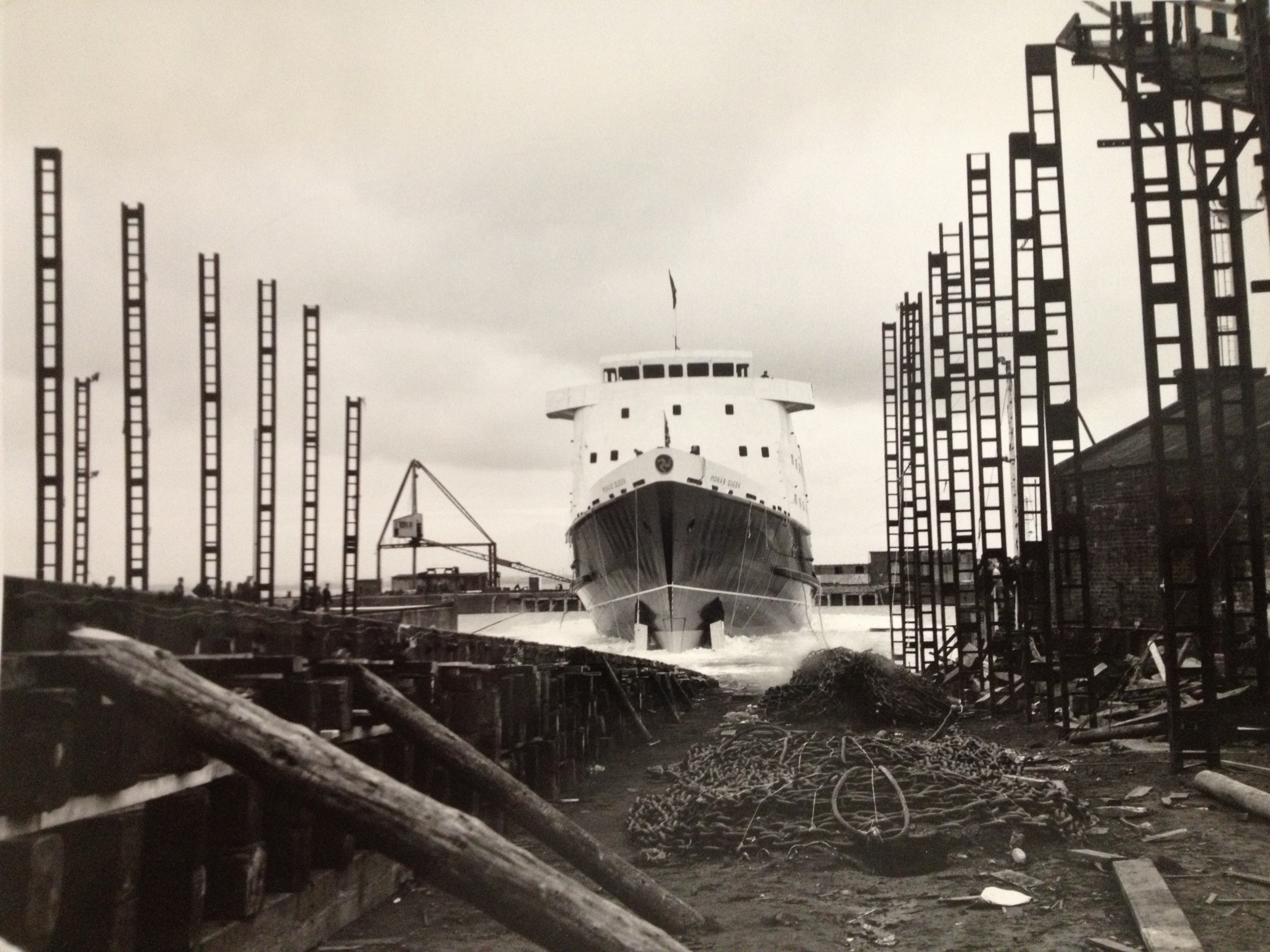
Mona's Queen is launched at Troon, 22 December 1971

Mona's Queen was built by Ailsa Shipbuilding Company at Troon, Scotland, the third of four car ferries constructed for the Isle of Man Steam Packet Company. The four were Manx Maid, Ben-my-Chree , Mona's Queen and Lady of Mann. Mona's Queen was the first diesel engined passenger ferry in the fleet.

Slightly heavier than her two predecessors, Mona's Queen had accommodation for 1600 passengers, 55 crew, and approximately 100 vehicles. Vehicles were loaded through side doors positioned at various levels on either side of the ship.

Mona's Queen was powered by two 10-cylinder P.C.2 Crossley Pielstick engines, producing 10,000 brake horsepower. Propulsion was by variable-pitch propellers – the first time these had been used in the Isle of Man fleet. These meant she could be controlled from the bridge or engine room, with all engine conditions monitored from a control room within the main engine room.

== Service history ==
Launched at Troon during Christmas week 1971, Mona's Queen made her maiden voyage from Liverpool to Douglas on 9 June 1972, just missing the peak traffic of TT week.

Mona's Queen gave reliable service to the Isle of Man from 1972 until 1985. She has two inaugural voyages to her credit, making the first car ferry trip from Douglas to Dublin in 1974, 133 years on from the first passenger service between the two ports, and in June 1976, Mona's Queen completed the first car ferry sailing from Fleetwood with 34 cars aboard.

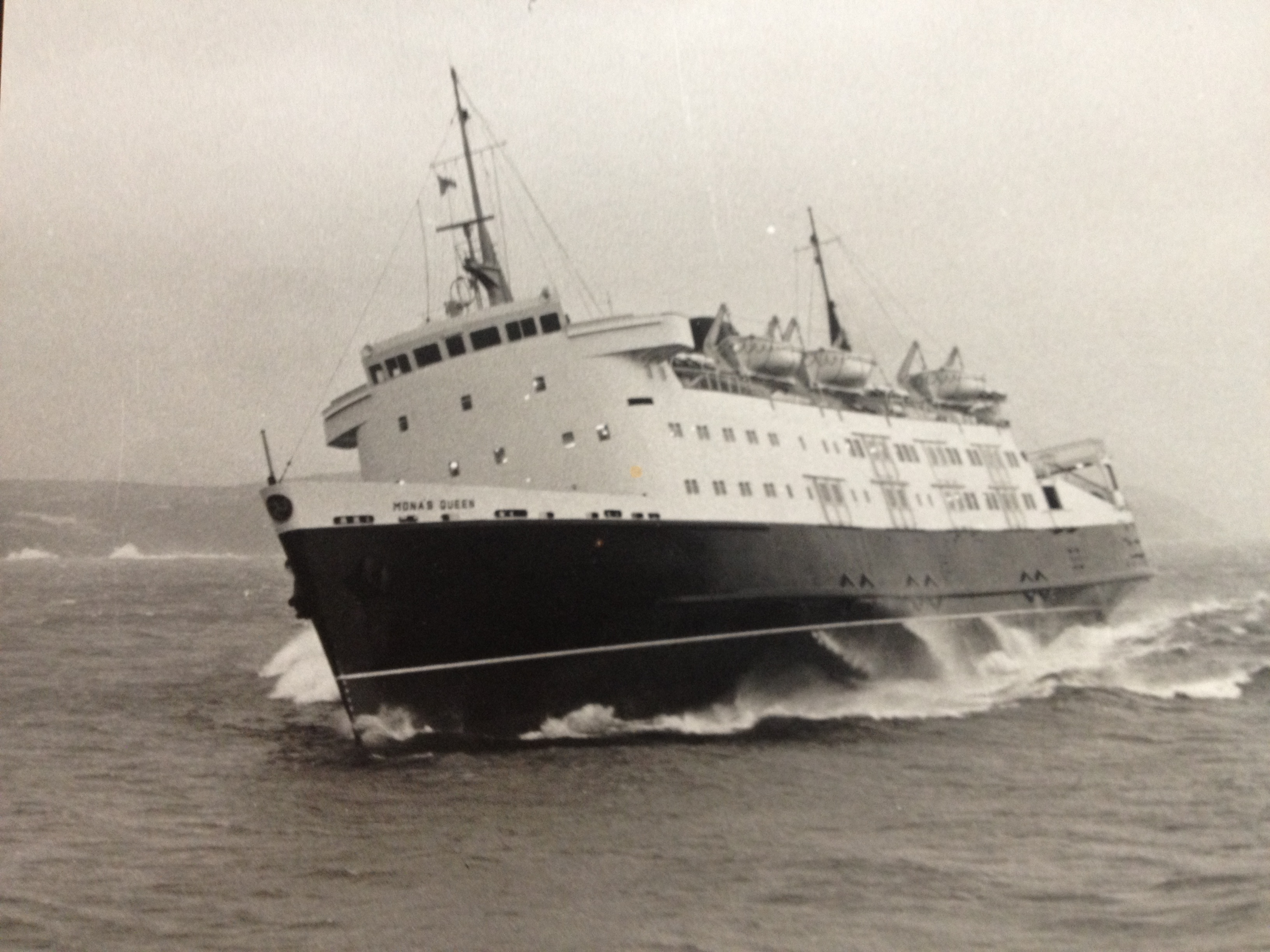
Mona's Queen encountering a rough swell on approach to Douglas. Prior to the completion of the Princess Alexandra Pier in 1983, approaches to Douglas could be particularly challenging during periods of strong south-westerly winds.

After the merger between the Steam Packet Co. and the Manx Line in 1985, Mona's Queen was used mainly during the holiday season or chartered out. In September 1989, she was chartered by Sealink for the services from Portsmouth and Weymouth to Cherbourg. She was withdrawn from service on 3 September 1990 and laid up at the Vittoria Dock, Birkenhead.

In December 1995, after a lengthy lay-up, she was sold to MBRS Lines (Manila-Banton-Romblon-San Agustin Shipping Lines) and renamed Mary the Queen. She sailed from Liverpool to the Philippines, covering 9,700 miles in 37 days. In Manila, she underwent an internal rebuild, converting her to a night ferry. Externally, the boat deck and bridge wings were covered, and several lifeboats removed. After the conversion, she operated mainly between Manila and Boracay.

On 9 February 2004 on a voyage from San Augustin to Manila she caught fire off Sibuyan Island; the fire was extinguished within an hour.

Mary the Queen was sold to Indian ship-breakers and beached at Alang on 1 September 2008.

In 2011, MBRS lines put an ex-Canary Islands cruise ship formerly named City of Valencia into service as Mary the Queen, servicing routes formerly serviced by her namesake.

== Gallery ==
RMS Mona's Queen
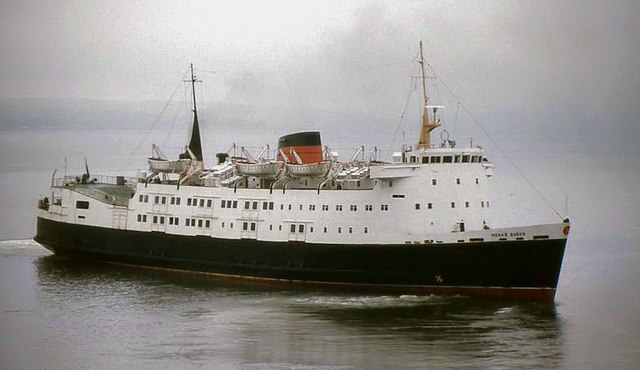
Mona's Queen approaching Stranraer

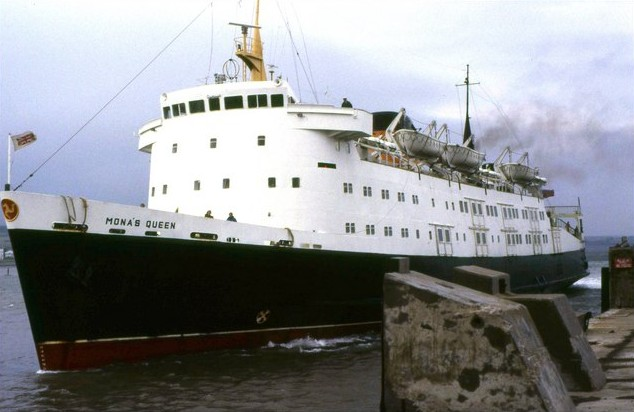
Mona's Queen docks at Stranraer
