= TSS Manx Maid (1910) =

RMS Packet steamer

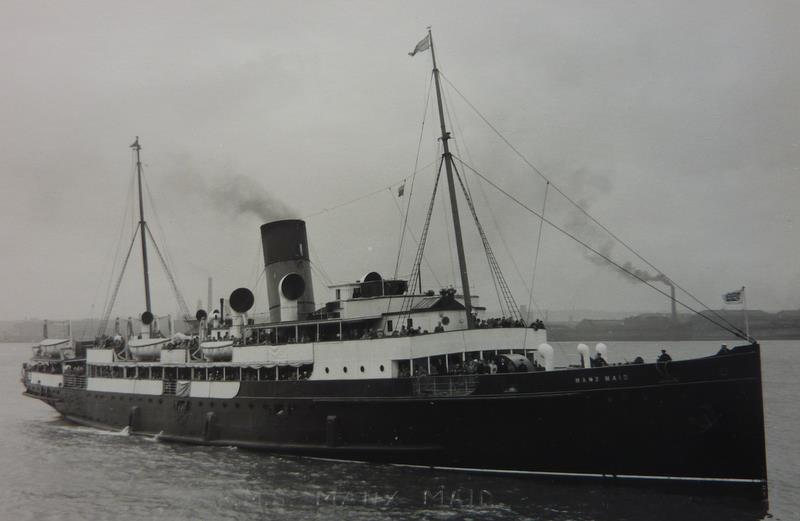
- RMS Manx Maid

History
- Name: 1910–1923: Caesarea; 1923-1941: Manx Maid 1941–1945: HMS Bruce; 1945 Manx Maid
- Owner: 1910–1923: London and Southwestern Railway Company; 1923-1950: Isle of Man Steam Packet Company
- Operator: 1910–1923: London and Southwestern Railway Company; 1923-1950: IoMSPCo.
- Port of registry: Douglas, Isle of Man
- Builder: Cammell Laird
- Cost: Not Recorded. Purchased by the Isle of Man Steam Packet Company for an initial sum of £9,000 in 1923.
- Yard number: 761
- Launched: 14 September 1910
- In service: 1910
- Out of service: 1950
- Identification: Official Number 131765.; Code Letters H R Q M; Code Letters S K M F
- Fate: Scrapped at Barrow-in-Furness, 1950

General characteristics
- Type: Packet Steamer
- Tonnage: 1,504 gross register tons (GRT)
- Length: 284 ft 6 in (86.7 m)
- Beam: 39 ft 1 in (11.9 m)
- Depth: 15 ft 8 in (4.8 m)
- Ice class: N/A
- Installed power: 6,500 shp (4,800 kW)
- Propulsion: Triple-screw. Driven by three directly coupled turbines, producing 6,500 shp (4,800 kW).
- Speed: 20 knots (23 mph)
- Capacity: 1470 passengers
- Crew: 51

TSS (RMS) Manx Maid (I) No. 131765 - the first ship in the company's history to be so named - was a packet steamer which was bought by the Isle of Man Steam Packet Company from the London and Southwestern Railway Company, and commenced service with the Steam Packet in 1923.

== Dimensions ==
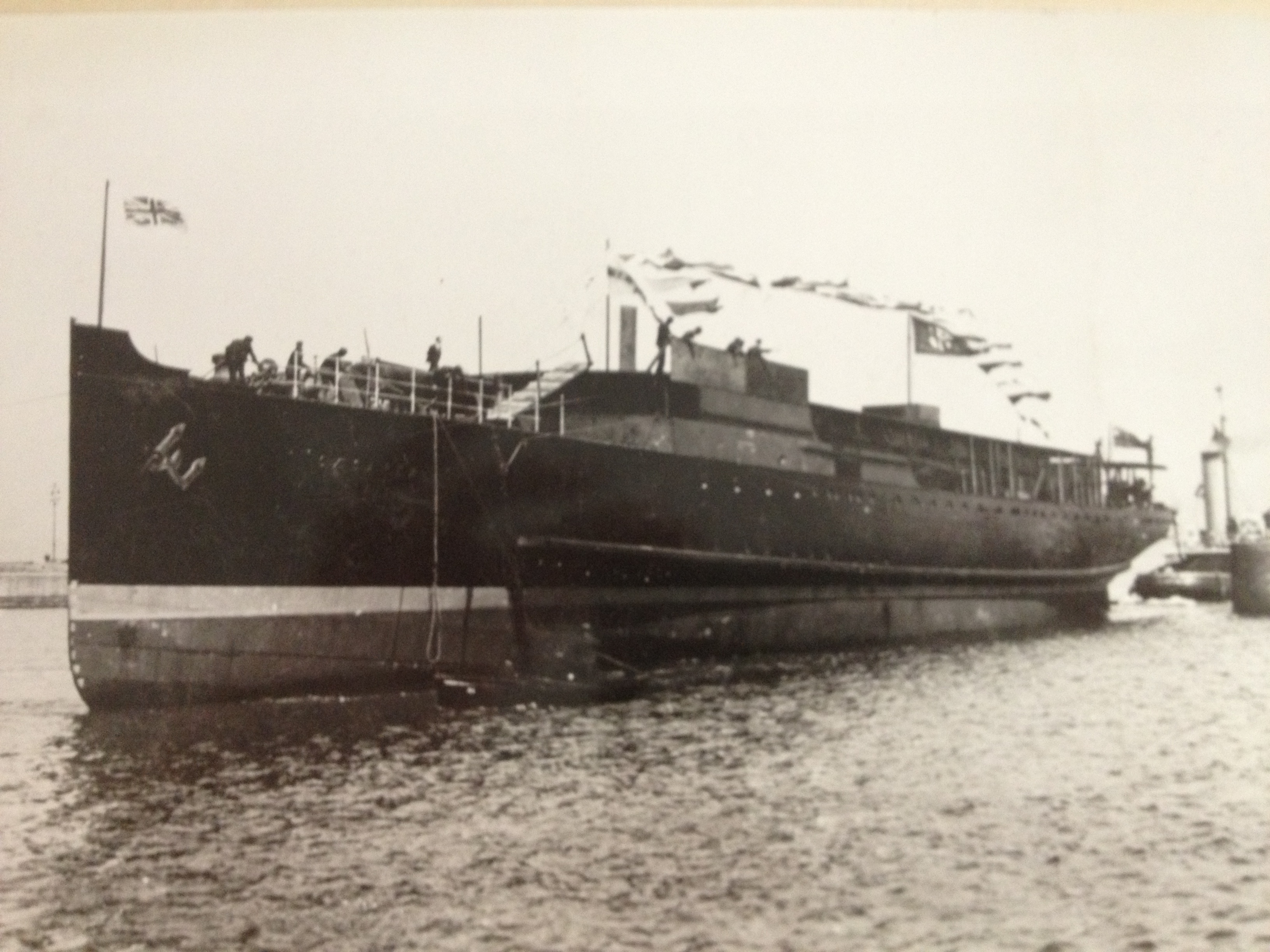
Caesarea is launched at Birkenhead, Wednesday 14 September 1910.

Her name came from Caesarea, the Latin name for the Island of Jersey.

Constructed for the London and Southwestern Railway Company and named Caesarea, the vessel was built by Cammell Laird at Birkenhead in 1910. Length 284'6"; beam 39'1"; depth 15'8". Caesarea was launched at Birkenhead on Wednesday 14 September 1910.

Caesarea was a steel; triple-screw turbine vessel, which had a registered tonnage of 1,504 GRT. Powered by three directly coupled turbines, and producing 6,500 i.h.p., Caesarea's boilers were double-ended circular return type, with a working steam pressure of 160 pounds p.s.i. This gave Caesarea a service speed of 20 knots.

== Service life ==
=== London and Southwestern Railway Company ===
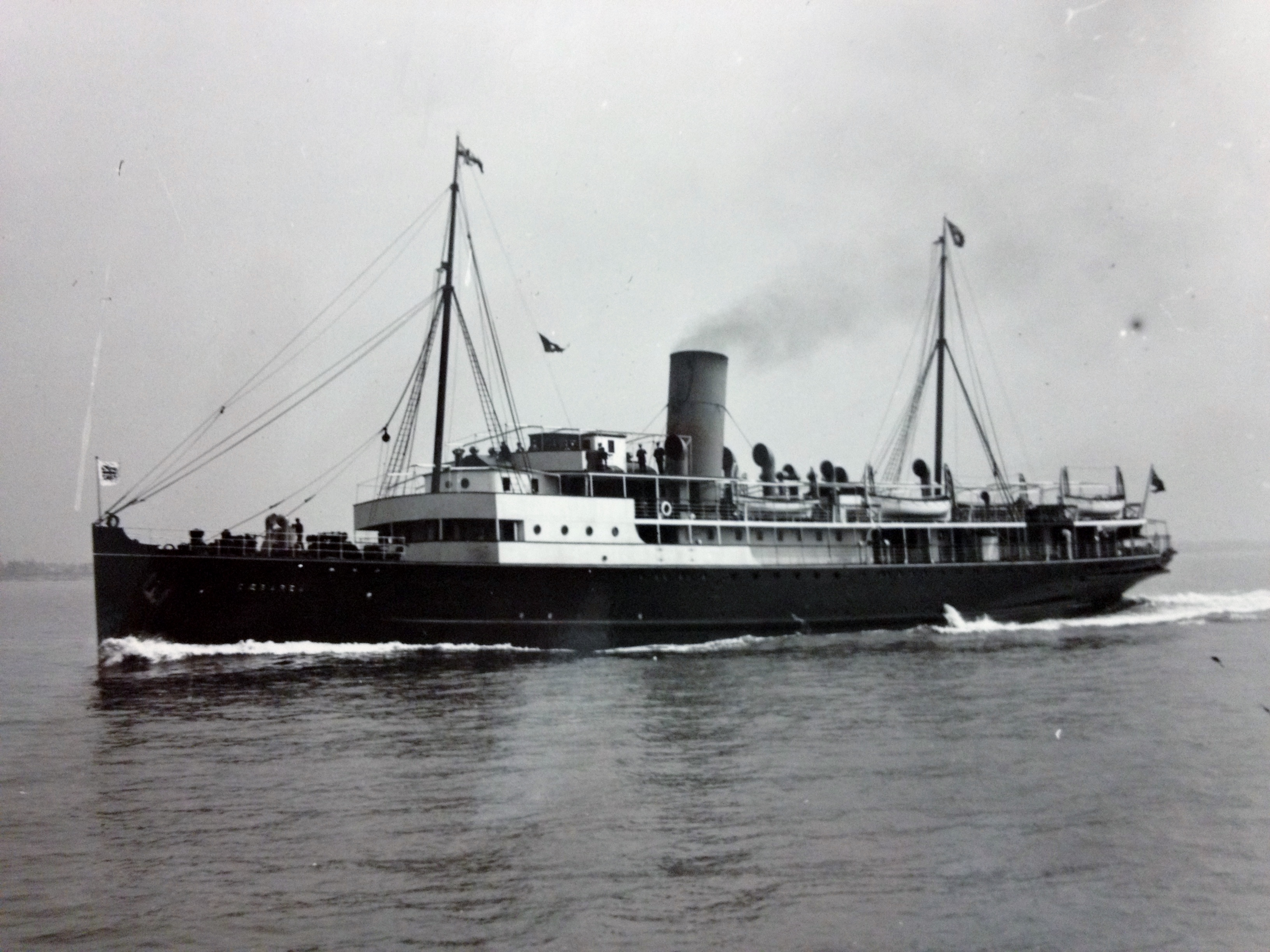
Caesarea pictured in the service of the London and Southwestern Railway Company.

Caesarea entered service with the London and Southwestern Railway Company in 1910, who employed her on the Southampton - Channel Islands service.

On 7 July 1923, in a thick fog, Caesarea struck a rock off Corbière as she was making passage from Jersey. Water began to enter the stokehold and engine room, whilst the stern began to fill, leading to the ship beginning to founder. She was able to turn round and almost made it back to St Helier Harbour, but sank just outside the pierheads. Caesarea was stuck fast for almost two weeks, but was refloated on 20 July on a spring tide. Nobody was injured. Following her salvage, Caesarea was taken under tow to Southampton for initial repair, and from there to Birkenhead at where her repairs were completed and she was acquired by the Isle of Man Steam Packet Company.

=== Isle of Man Steam Packet Company ===
Purchased by the Isle of Man Steam Packet Company in December 1923 for an initial price of £9,000 and renamed Manx Maid, she was refitted at a cost of £22,500 and converted to oil burning for a further £7,000 resulting in a total cost to the Company of £38,500.

Manx Maid was fired by six furnaces for each boiler and at 18 knots would consume 84 tons of oil in 24 hours - or 36 tons at 12 knots.

Manx Maid entered service with the Steam Packet fleet in time for the 1924 tourist season. She was employed operating to the numerous destinations then served by the company, and continued to give reliable service to and from the Island, until with the dark clouds of war beginning to gather, she was requisitioned by the Admiralty on 27 August 1939, as an ABV - an armoured boarding vessel.

=== War service ===
Manx Maid saw service in both World Wars. In 1914, she was requisitioned and served throughout the World War I under her original name, Caesarea.

In World War II she was requisitioned in August 1939, and served as an ABV, an Armed Boarding Vessel.

As other Steam Packet ships were attending the Evacuation of Dunkirk, Manx Maid took no part in Operation Dynamo, as she was undergoing repairs at the time. However, once her repairs were completed, she was ordered to Southampton and made two crossings into the war zone as the retreat moved westwards along the French coast. Her first mission took her to St Malo, but by the time she arrived the port was already under German occupation. She escaped after being unable to go inshore, and returned to England.

She then made passage to Brest, and in one trip brought out nearly 3,000 troops, roughly twice her allowable passenger complement. Manx Maid pulled out in a heavy swell followed by the RMS Lady of Mann, and a cross-channel railway steamer. Manx Maid was almost two feet below her marks, and consequently developed condenser trouble meaning she had to heave to for nearly three hours some distance off the French Coast with the main enemy force approximately 30 miles from the port. Even so, she finally reached Plymouth safely.

In October 1941 she became a 'Special Duties' vessel and was renamed H.M.S. Bruce by the Royal Navy. From the end of March 1942 she became a Fleet Air Arm target vessel, continuing those duties until March, 1945.

She was paid off at Ardrossan on 21 March 1945 (minus her mainmast), and returned to the Isle of Man Steam Packet Company that day.

=== Post-war service and disposal ===
Following her war service, Manx Maid returned to the Isle of Man. After a refit, she resumed her duties within the Steam Packet fleet, where she once again worked on the peak traffic routes, until with the introduction of the King Orry, Mona's Queen, Tynwald and Snaefell, the decision was made to put her up for disposal.

Manx Maid was towed to Barrow-in-Furness for breaking up in November 1950.

=== Gallery ===
Caesarea; pictured following her foundering and subsequent salvage at Jersey, July 1923.
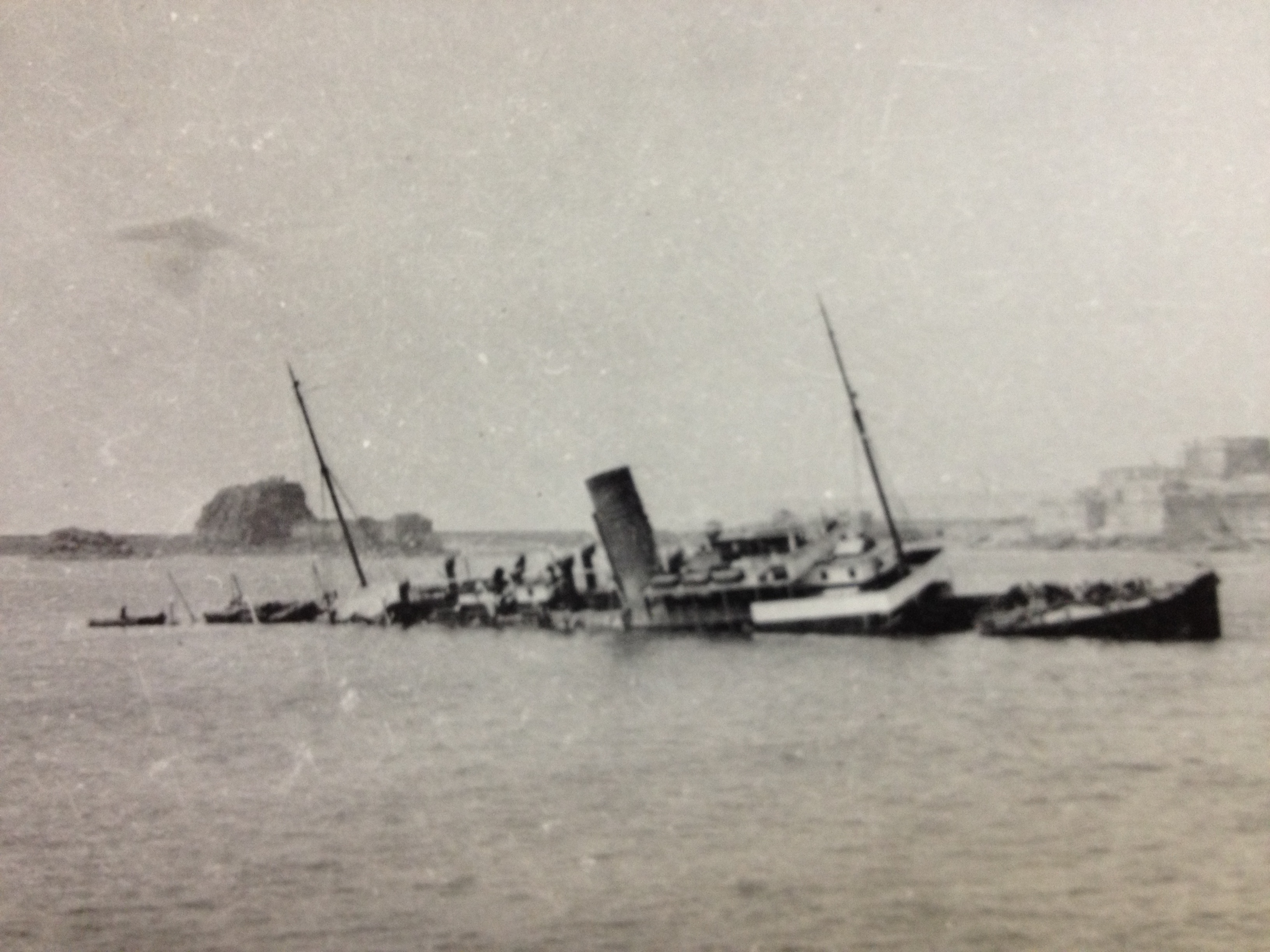

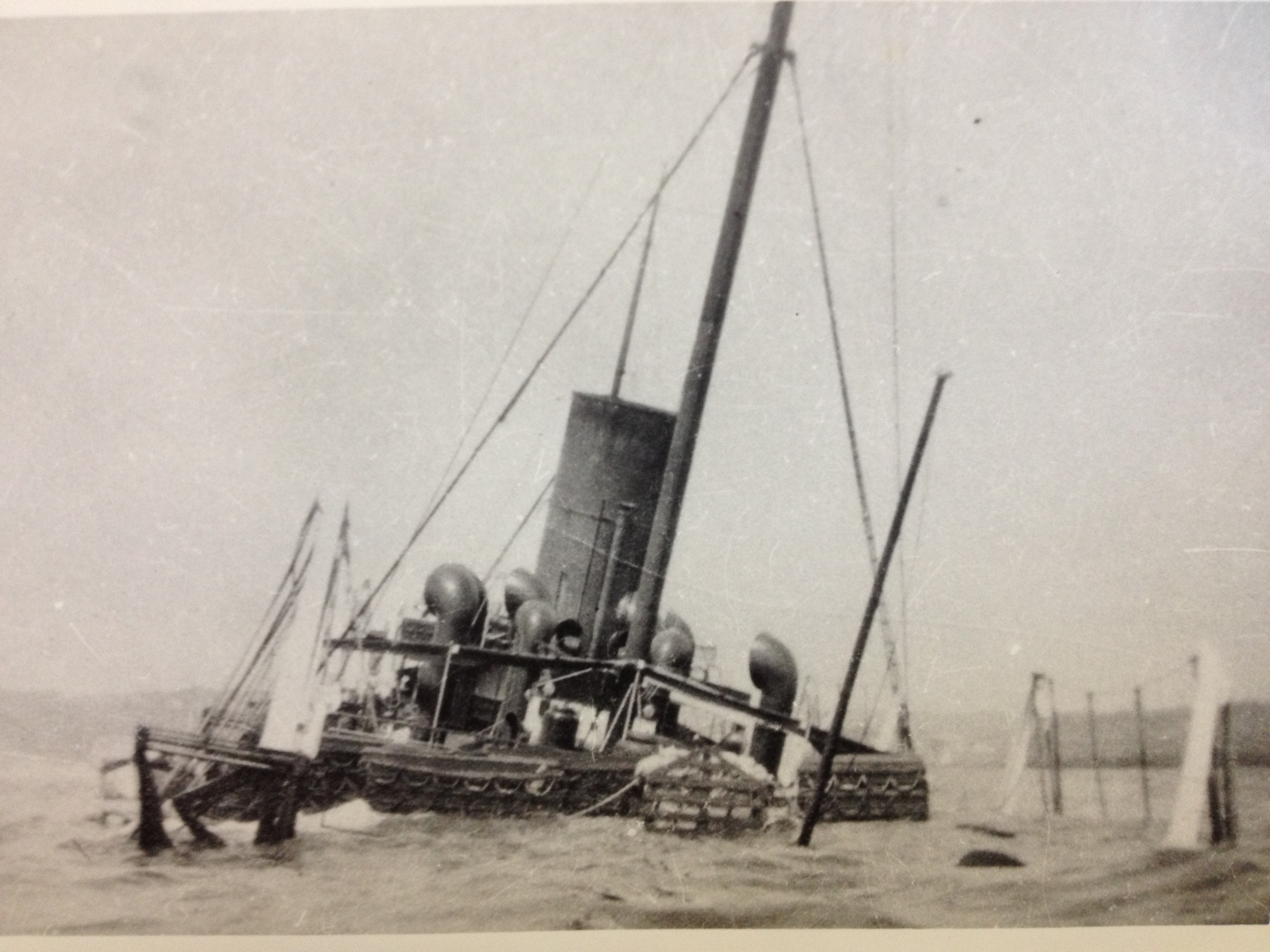

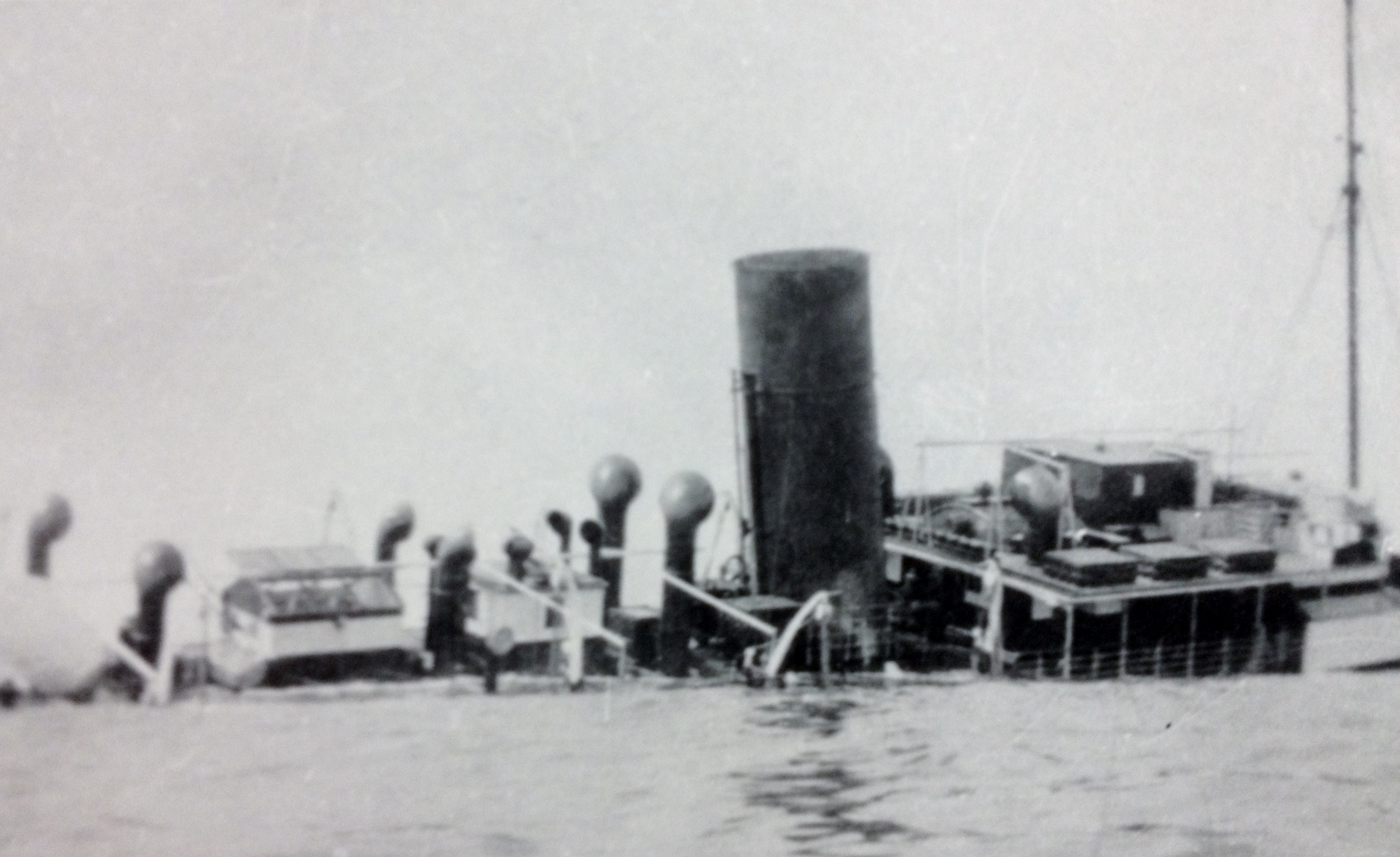

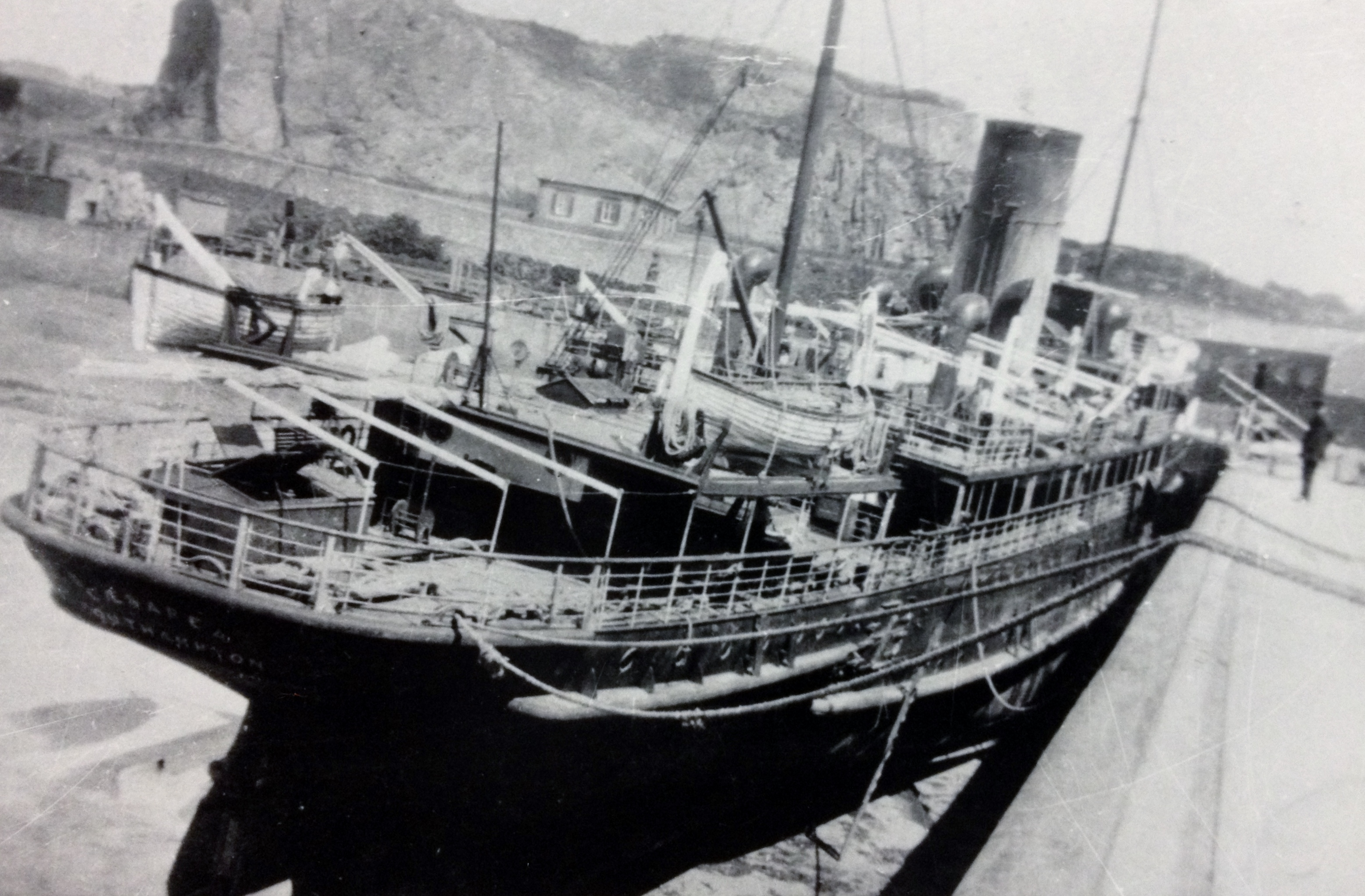
