= Panagia Soumela (ship) =

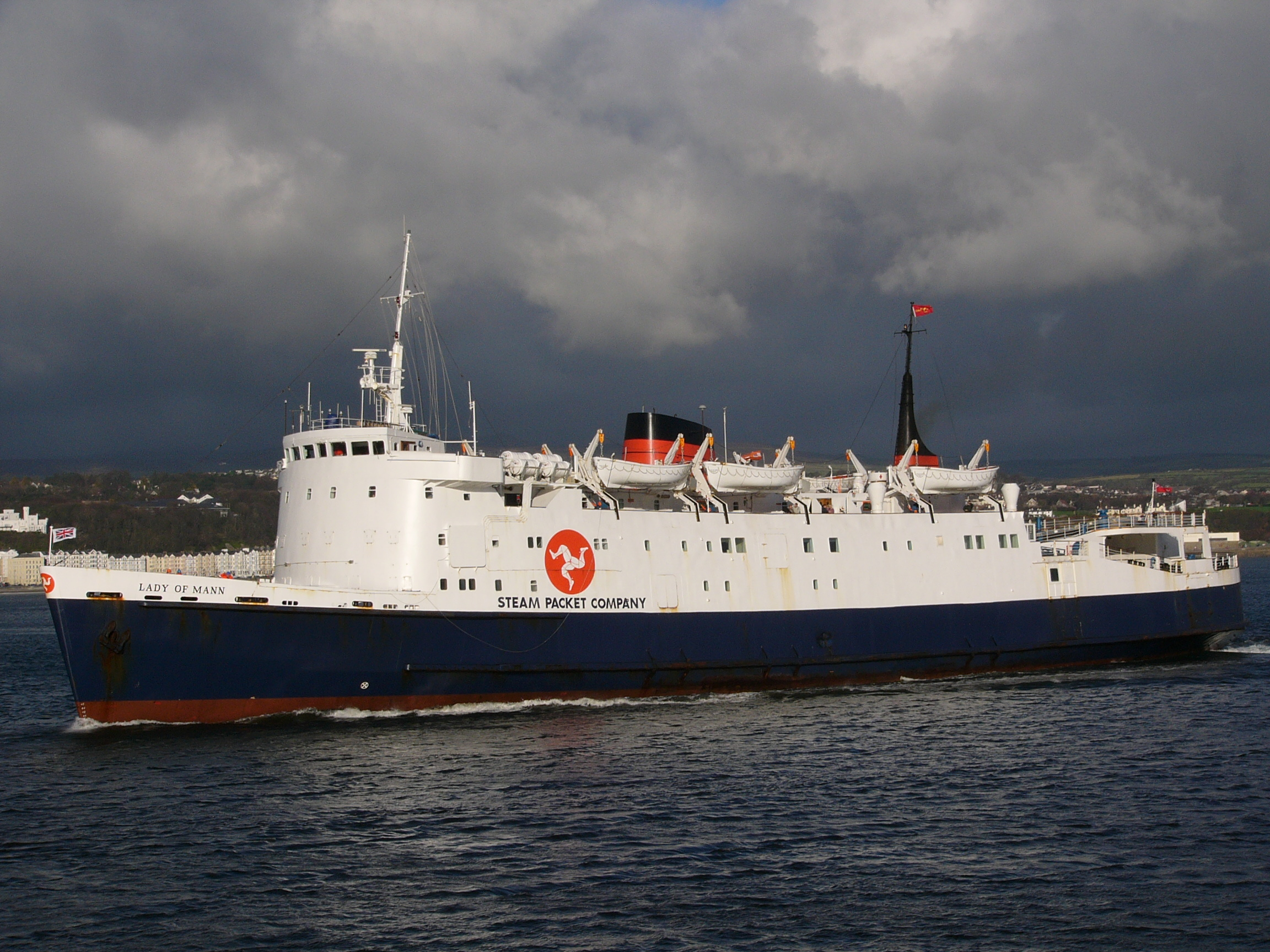
- Lady of Mann arrives in Douglas, 2004

History
- Name: 1976–2005: Lady of Mann; 2005–2011: Panagia Soumela
- Owner: 1976–2005: IOMSPCo.; 2005–2011: SAOS Ferries
- Operator: 1976–2005: IOMSPCo.; 2005–2011: SAOS Ferries
- Port of registry: Douglas (1976–2005); Piraeus (2005–2011)
- Route: 1976–2005: Douglas–Liverpool; 2005–2011: Unknown
- Builder: Ailsa Shipbuilding, Troon, Scotland
- Cost: £3,800,000
- Yard number: 547
- Launched: 4 December 1975
- Christened: 1975
- Completed: 1976
- Acquired: 1976
- Maiden voyage: 30 June 1976
- In service: 1976
- Out of service: 2011
- Identification: IMO number: 7400259
- Nickname(s): The "Lady"
- Fate: Sold in 2011, for scrapping in Turkey.

General characteristics (as Lady of Mann)
- Type: Side-loading vehicle ferry
- Tonnage: 3,083 GT
- Length: 104.43 m (342 ft 7 in)
- Beam: 16.74 m (54 ft 11 in)
- Draught: 3.63 m (11 ft 11 in)
- Ice class: 1A
- Installed power: 2× 12-cylinder Pielstick diesels 8092 kW
- Propulsion: 2 propellers
- Speed: 21 kn (39 km/h)
- Range: 19,000 nautical miles
- Capacity: 1,200 passengers; 100+ cars

General characteristics (as Panagia Soumela)
- Class & type: ro-ro ferry
- Tonnage: 4,482 GT
- Capacity: 750 passengers; 125 cars

MS Lady of Mann (II) was a side-loading car ferry built in 1976 for the Isle of Man Steam Packet Company and operated on the Douglas–Liverpool crossing. She served the company for 29 years. In 2005, she was converted to a Roll-on/roll-off ferry and was operated by SAOS Ferries in Greece under the name MS Panagia Soumela until she was scrapped in August 2011.

== Isle of Man Steam Packet Company ==
Lady of Mann was the final vessel in a quartet with Manx Maid of 1962, Ben-my-Chree of 1966 and Mona's Queen of 1972. She was the second vessel in the line's history to be so named, the first being the company's "centenary steamer", RMS Lady of Mann which entered service in 1930. The fourth car ferry was ordered from Ailsa Shipbuilding in Troon, Scotland as demand for car space continued. Lady of Mann arrived in service in 1976. Known as the "Lady", she was the flagship of the fleet until 1984.

Based on the earlier Mona's Queen, she was 2 inches (51 mm) smaller and had 12-cylinder diesel engines, compared to her elder sister's 10. Her maiden voyage was the morning sailing to Liverpool on 30 June 1976. Already several weeks late, she had missed the peak TT traffic, something which caused much stress for the Steam Packet Company.

Lady of Mann remained the fleet's flagship until 1984, when she was replaced by Mona's Isle. Her owners were in financial difficulties, forcing a merger with Manx Line.

In 1989, Lady of Mann was withdrawn from service for a £2.6 million refit at Wright and Beyer. She received a complete modernisation of the interior layout, increased vehicle capacity, passenger capacity for 1000, and a new livery; she returned to service on 26 May 1989. This made her sister Mona's Queen redundant, and she was withdrawn from service in 1990.

Disaster struck on 2 June 1993. Instead of going astern onto the Victoria Pier in Douglas, she surged straight ahead and crashed into the Battery Pier, crumpling her bow. She was temporarily repaired, and issued with a lower passenger certificate to operate during TT, after which she was withdrawn for permanent repairs. The first fastcraft to operate from the island was a result of this, with SeaCat Scotland making a return sailing from Stranraer.

1994 saw the arrival of the first SeaCat to operate for the Steam Packet Company, and HSC SeaCat Isle of Man operated for the company in place of Lady of Mann. A period of calm weather allowed successful operation for the wave-restricted SeaCat. Problems at the end of August led to Lady of Mann returning to service, and a drop in passenger numbers, who had been tempted by the SeaCat's high speed. 1995 saw Lady of Mann operate for Porto Santo Line in Madeira.

In 1996, the Steam Packet Company was bought by Sea Containers and all vessels in the fleet were painted in the new owner's blue livery.

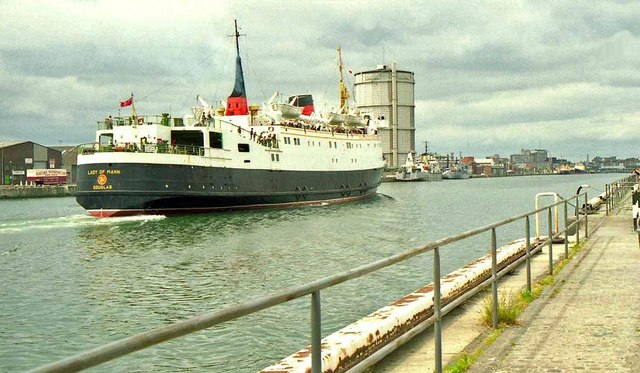
Lady of Mann arrives in Dublin

After the 1996 TT, Lady of Mann was employed on the new Liverpool–Dublin service, taking around 6 hours to complete a passage. She was replaced on this service in 1997 by SuperSeaCat Two, and often came to the rescue of the craft due to recurrent technical problems and weather cancellations. She was joined in 1997 by the new flagship, Ben-my-Chree, the largest vessel the company has ever operated.

Following the 1999 TT period, she was not sent to her usual Madeira charter, but instead retained as a back-up vessel for Ben-my-Chree. The winter of 1999 led to a long programme of sailings for Lady of Mann, with the fastcraft and Ben-my-Chree unable to operate. The following year after TT, she was sent to the Azores for a three-month charter. During the winter of 2000–01, Lady of Mann maintained the company's Douglas–Liverpool services, before entering Cammell Laird yard for a refit to comply with the latest SOLAS regulations, which included a new fast response craft on her starboard boat deck.

Due to the foot and mouth outbreak, Lady of Mann's 25th anniversary cruise to her birthplace in Troon was cancelled, to prevent the disease reaching the island. This also led to cancellation of the annual TT races. Lady of Mann covered for Ben-my-Chree on 28/29 May 2002 when the latter had to be withdrawn for emergency repairs.

Sea Containers put the Steam Packet up for sale and it was bought by Montagu Private Equity.

During Ben-my-Chree's major refit in 2004, sailings were covered by Lady of Mann and the chartered freight ship Hoburgen. The island had a record TT season in 2004 after which, Lady of Mann went out once again on charter to the Azores, returning for the winter schedule. During the winter of 2004, the Steam Packet Company operated only Ben-my-Chree and Lady of Mann, with the fastcraft being laid up.

In 2005, the company sold the "Lady" to SAOS Ferries of Greece.

== SAOS Ferries ==
Renamed Panagia Soumela, she left Liverpool for the final time in October 2005, arriving in Greece the following month. Over the winter of 2005-6, she was converted to a stern-loading vessel in Piraeus, increasing in size considerably. This left her ex-fleetmate Mary the Queen as the sole example of a Steam Packet side-loader still in service.

In August 2006, Panagia Soumela commenced operations for SAOS Ferries on the Lavrion–Limnos route. In December 2008, she was laid up in Lavrion but returned to service the same month. As of 2009, the Panagia Soumela continued to operate between Lavrion and Limnos.

Panagia Soumela was sold in 2011 to be scrapped at Aliağa, Turkey.

== In popular culture ==
In 1991, Lady of Mann appeared in Alan Parker's movie, The Commitments.

Lady of Mann, features in the Gerry and the Pacemakers video of their re-release of "Ferry Across the Mersey".

Lady of Mann, appears prominently in the background during the Granada UK sketch-comedy series, Alfresco, in episode 5 of the first series (1983) in a sketch in which two characters walk along the docks.
