= Isle of Man Steam Packet Company =

Manx shipping company

- Type: Private
- Industry: Transport
- Founded: 1830; 196 years ago
- Headquarters: Douglas, Isle of Man
- Key people: Brian Thomson (Managing Director); Dan Clague (Chairman)
- Owner: Isle of Man Government (since 2018)
- Website: www.steam-packet.com

Route map

The Isle of Man Steam Packet Company Limited (abbreviated to IoMSPCo or, locally, The Steam Packet (Manx: Phaggad Bree Ellan Vannin)) is the oldest continuously operating passenger shipping company in the world, having been founded in 1830.

The company provides freight, passenger and vehicle services between the Isle of Man Sea Terminal, in Douglas, Isle of Man, and four ports in the United Kingdom and Ireland. It is owned by the Isle of Man Government.

== History ==
=== Beginning of the company ===
House flags

House Flag of Isle of Man Steam Packet Co

IOMSPC old fleet commodore’s flag

There had been various shipping companies serving the Isle of Man before the formation of this company in 1830, but their crossings were irregular and vessels used were unreliable. As a result, the island could be cut off for weeks at a time.

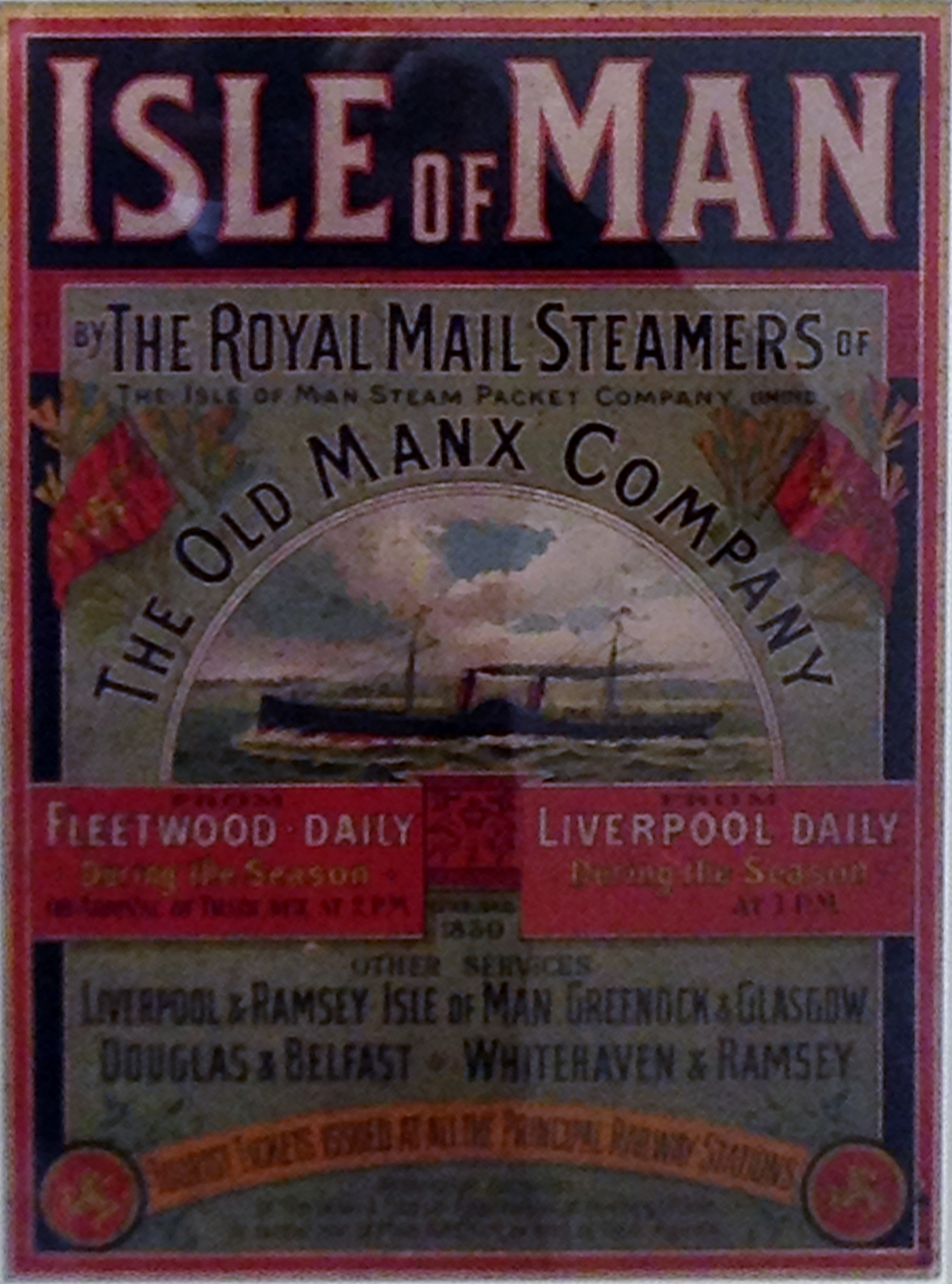
Isle of Man Steam Packet Poster.

The Manx people felt it was essential they should have their own dedicated service. A meeting was held in Douglas in 1829, from which was formed a committee charged investigating the cost of acquiring a steam packet.

On 30 June 1830, the forerunner of today's Isle of Man Steam Packet Company was born when the brand new vessel, Mona's Isle, built at a cost of £7,250, sailed from Douglas to Liverpool on its very first sailing. From the inauguration of the service until January 1832, the company was known as the Mona's Isle Company. Briefly the company then traded as the Isle of Man United Steam Packet, before assuming its present name in July 1832.

By the turn of the 20th century, the company was serving numerous ports in England, Wales, Scotland and Ireland. Ports served included Liverpool, Silloth, Whitehaven, Holyhead, Ardrossan, Blackpool, Belfast and Dublin.

=== War service ===
Vessels and crews of the company were actively involved in both the First and Second World Wars. One vessel, King Orry, was attached to the British Grand Fleet and led a section of the German High Seas Fleet into the Firth of Forth at the end of the First World War. Another vessel, Viking, was converted to become a seaplane carrier, serving as HMS Vindex.

During the First World War, eleven out of a total fleet of fifteen Steam Packet ships were requisitioned by the Admiralty. Four of them were lost, three retained by the government and four returned to service. Ben-my-Chree and the Midland Railways' Manxman (purchased by IOMSPC in 1920) also served as aircraft/seaplane carriers.

In the Second World War, ten of the fleet of sixteen ships were commandeered for active duty, four of which were lost. The Dunkirk evacuation was perhaps the company's finest hour, with Mona's Isle (IV) being the first to leave Dover and the first to complete the round trip during the evacuation. Eight company ships took part in this mission, rescuing a total of 24,699 British troops – one in fourteen of those evacuated from Dunkirk. This was the company's blackest day, as three of the line's ships were lost:

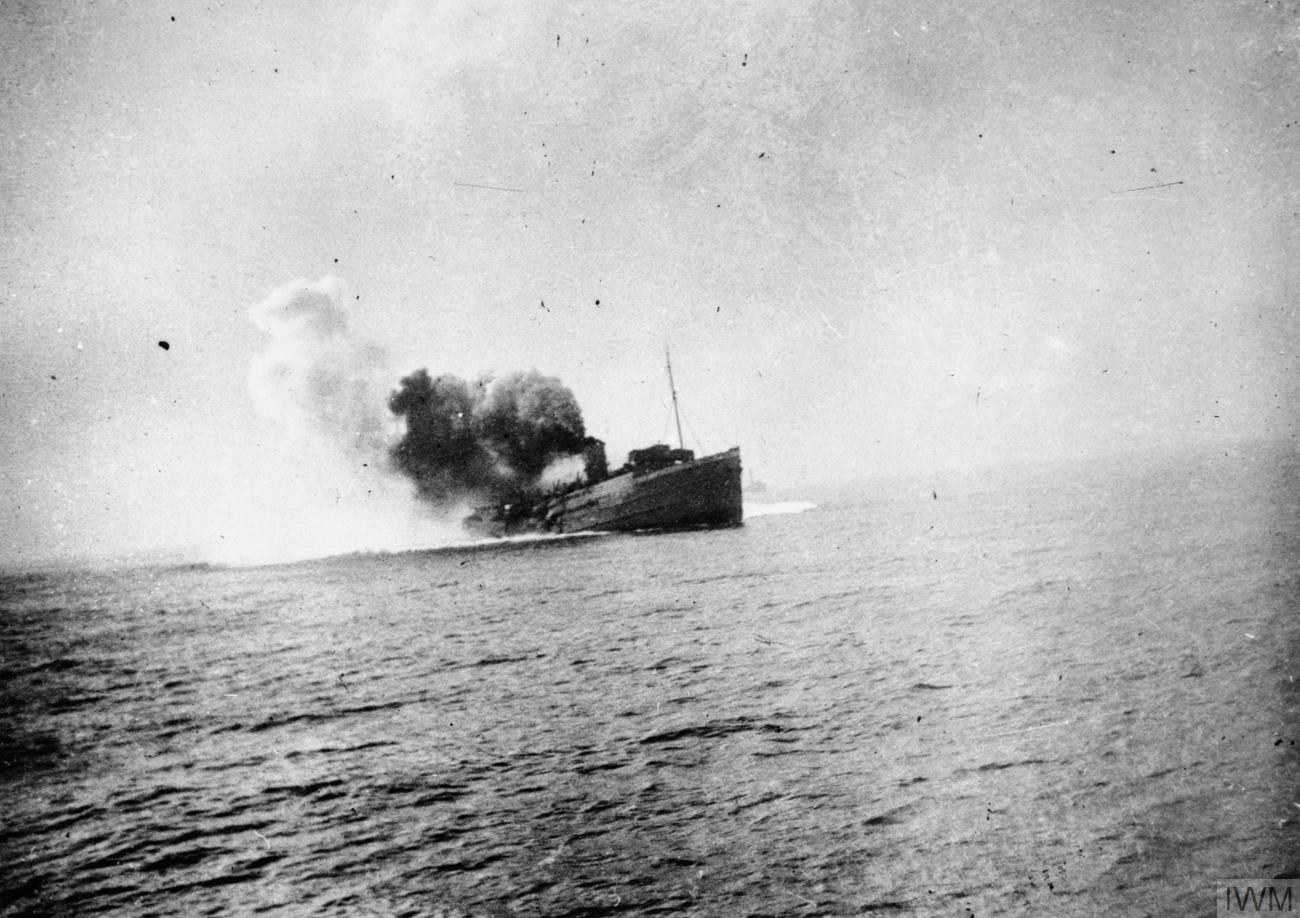
Mona's Queen (III) pictured shortly after she struck a mine on the approach to Dunkirk, 29 May 1940.

- Mona's Queen, mined off Dunkirk on 29 May;
- Fenella, sunk by air attack whilst berthed alongside Dunkirk's East Pier on 29 May;
- King Orry, sustained heavy damage following several air attacks on 29 May, and sank off the beaches in the early hours of 30 May.

The anchor from Mona's Queen (III) was raised as part of the 70th anniversary commemoration of Operation Dynamo at Dunkirk. It is sited at Kallow Point in Port St Mary as a memorial to the company's crew who took part in the war.

=== Post-war service ===
Four side-loading roll-on/roll-off car ferries were introduced, beginning with Manx Maid in 1962, and followed by Ben-my-Chree (1966), Mona's Queen (1972) and Lady of Mann (1976). Mona's Isle (VI) was the Steam Packet Company's first stern loader in 1984–85.

The 1980s were tough times for the company, with declining passenger numbers. Strong competition from Manx Line's Manx Viking brought them close to collapse. In February 1985, they announced a merger with Sealink who had, by now, taken over Manx Line. The main UK port switched from Liverpool to Heysham, thus ending (albeit temporarily as it turned out) an association lasting back to the company's origins.

In 1996, the Steam Packet Company became a wholly owned subsidiary of Sea Containers headed by James Sherwood, who had pioneered the fast-craft operation. In July 2003, the company was sold for £142 million to Montagu Private Equity. In 2005, the company was purchased by Macquarie Bank for £225 million.

On 3 February 2007, Sea Express 1 (formerly SeaCat Isle of Man) collided with the cargo ship Alaska Rainbow in heavy fog in the River Mersey. None of the 294 passengers and crew were hurt, and the ferry was moored at Liverpool Pier Head while water was being pumped from the engine room, a number of cars remained on board. She was later towed to the Cammell Laird basin in Birkenhead where all cars remaining aboard were offloaded. On 14 March 2007, the Sea Express 1 was relaunched. In the meantime alternative service was provided by Ben-my-Chree to Birkenhead during the weekends. In December 2007, the vessel was renamed to become the sixth Snaefell.

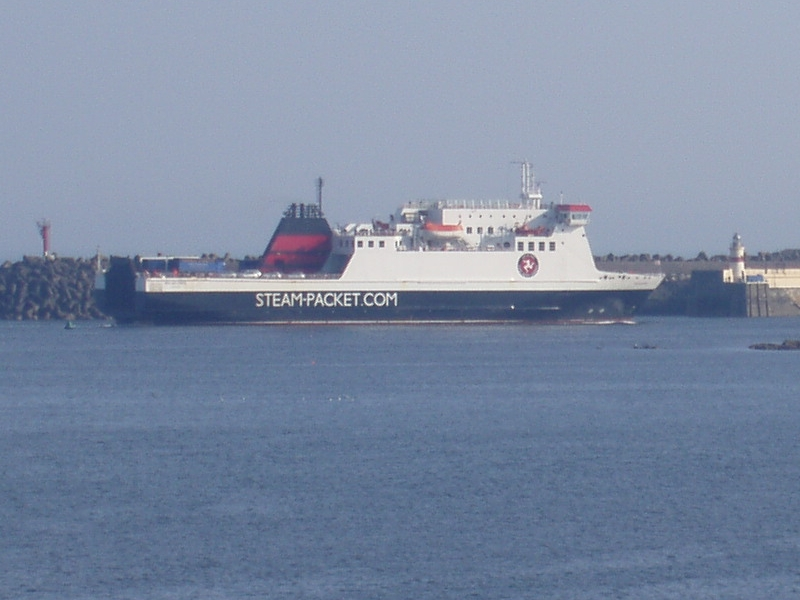
Ben-my-Chree entering Douglas Harbour

In June 2007, a new CEO, Mark Woodward, was appointed to succeed Hamish Ross; he promised to improve the company's services, to return to the classic livery, and to promote the island's culture.

As the first part of the rebranding, the Sea Express 1 and SuperSeaCat Two were renamed Snaefell and Viking respectively; the latter was later sold and operated for the Atlantico Line as Hellenic Wind.

The fleet received a brand new livery, replacing the old SeaCo livery. All vessels of the fleet underwent complete internal refits which reflected the company's new colours and the rebranding of the company's on board lounges. The terminals received new signage and new uniforms were made for crew and shore staff.

The company's first class lounge and members club were renamed: 1st Lounge became the Premium Lounge and the Blue Riband Club became the Executive Club. The Quiet Lounge was also renamed, becoming the Niarbyl Reserved Lounge.

On 26 March 2010, while embarking passengers and loading vehicles at Heysham, England, the ro-ro passenger ferry Ben-my-Chree moved approximately eight metres (8.7 yards) along the quayside, causing serious damage to the passenger access structure. The foot-passenger walkway detached at both ends and collapsed onto the quayside, and the gangway detached from the vessel's side shell door and was left hanging on a single rope. There were no injuries. Eight passengers were trapped in the gangway compartment of the shore structure and were later rescued by the local fire service.

On 1 November 2010, it was reported on the Isle of Man Newspapers website, that the Steam Packet had lost two major freight customers to rival company Mezeron who had just set up a new freight service between Douglas and Liverpool a week or so earlier. In February 2011 Mezeron withdrew the service citing lack of growth in the market. Previously the Steam Packet Company had reported a loss of 15% of its total freight business to Mezeron.

In April 2011, it was announced that the company had new owners Banco Espírito Santo. In May 2018, it was confirmed that the Isle of Man Government had agreed a deal worth £124 million to purchase 100% of MIOM Ltd, the parent company of the Isle of Man Steam Packet Company. The deal was approved by Tynwald on 16 May 2018.

In early 2013, Sea Alliance announced plans for a new shipping company to serve the Isle of Man. The company planned to use a 32-year-old vessel Cometa. However the venture failed and nothing has been heard since.

== Current services ==
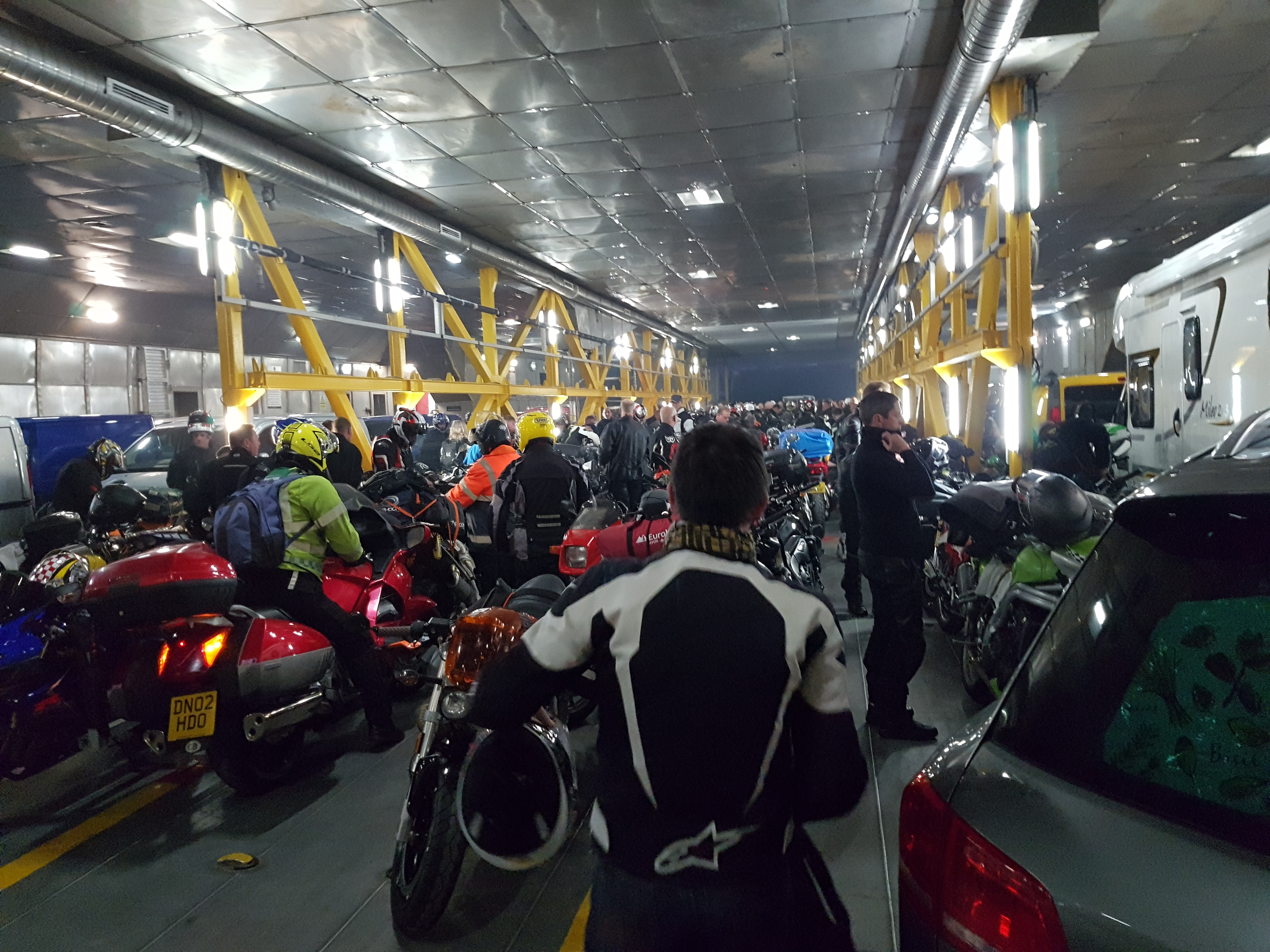
Motorcyclists on the Manannan from Liverpool

In return for exclusive use of the government linkspan at Douglas, the Steam Packet Company has guaranteed regular services to the Manx government. Ben-my-Chree, Manxman and Manannan provide regular services to England and Ireland.

In addition to the regular routes, the company operates a few special day excursions to other destinations or round the Isle of Man in summer. Extra sailings are scheduled at times of high demand such as the Isle of Man TT period. The company also operates its own in-house travel agency, Steam Packet Holidays.

In August 2017, the company announced a consultation to switch sailings from Belfast to Larne, to allow sailings to carry freight, motorhomes and coaches which could not be loaded at Belfast's Albert Quay.

The Steam Packet Company operates services between:

- Douglas - Heysham (Year-round service)
- Douglas - Liverpool (Seasonal service - March to November)
- Douglas - Larne (Year-round service)
- Douglas - Dublin (Seasonal service - April to September)

== Film appearances ==
Steam Packet ships have been used in a number of films. Mona's Queen is seen dockside in Liverpool in the 1935 George Formby comedy No Limit. In the Barbra Streisand film, Yentl the ship carrying emigrants to the United States at the end of the film is the Manxman. The Manxman also appears in Chariots of Fire. The Ben-my-Chree [6] was used in 2004 as a double for an English Channel ferry in the film On a Clear Day. The Lady of Mann was also used in the 2004 film Mickybo and Me and also appears, in Dublin, in Alan Parker's movie The Commitments.

== Fleet ==
The company operates four vessels - 2 year-round conventional RO-PAX vessels, a fastcraft which operates seasonally, and a RO-RO freighter. The freighter is available for use when required, and is otherwise often on short-term charter to other operators throughout the year.

Picture	Name	Built	Capacity		Routes	Notes
Picture	Name	Built	Passengers	Vehicles	Routes	Notes
	Arrow	1998	12	65		RORO container and cargo vessel
	Ben-my-Chree [VI]	1998	500	200	Douglas–Larne (year-round); Douglas - Dublin (seasonal)	
	Manannan	1998	850	175	Douglas–Liverpool (seasonal)	
	Manxman [III]	2023	948	237 cars 75 trailers	Douglas–Heysham (year-round); Douglas - Liverpool (Winter-Only)	Fleet flagship

In August 2020, the company ordered a new ferry from South Korean shipbuilder Hyundai Mipo Dockyard to replace Ben-my-Chree upon delivery in 2023. The new ship is the Manxman. In September 2022 it was announced that Arrow had been purchased from Seatruck Ferries after being on long-term charter.

== Historic fleet ==
The company started with wooden paddle steamers, which soon gave way to the steel "screw" vessels. The "screw" vessels were superseded by turbine steamers, the first being the 1905 SS Viking. The company then replaced the passenger-only steamers with side-loading car ferries, the first diesel car ferry being the 1972 Mona's Queen (V). Fastcraft then became the next generation of vessels to operate for the company, the first being the SeaCat Isle of Man.

=== Pre-war steamers ===
The company built five steamers over ten years from 1927. They were the replacements for the various second-hand steamers that the company purchased to replace its First World War losses.

Image	Ship	Built (Commissioned)	Route	Tonnage	Notes
Ben-my-Chree	Ben-my-Chree [IV]	April 1927 (June 1927)	Douglas — various	2,586 GT	Scrapped at Ghent in 1965
Lady of Mann	Lady of Mann [I]	April 1929 (June 1930)	Douglas — various	3,104 GT	Scrapped at Dalmuir in 1971
Mona's Queen	Mona's Queen [III]	April 1934 (? 1934)	Douglas — various	2,756 GT	Sunk at Dunkirk in 1940
Fenella	Fenella	December 1936 (? 1937)	Douglas — various	2,376 GT	Sunk at Dunkirk in 1940
Tynwald	Tynwald [IV]	December 1936 (? 1937)	Douglas — various	2,376 GT	Sunk off Bougie in 1942

=== The "Six Sisters" ===
A class of vessel derived from pre-war steamers Fenella and Tynwald affectionately known as the Six Sisters. These were all built by Cammell Laird in Birkenhead and were in service between 1946 and 1982. They operated from Douglas to various ports. No two vessels were identical and all had their own (albeit minor) differences. The last vessel to be withdrawn was Manxman in 1982. At the time it was the last vessel of its type in service in the British Isles. Despite preservation attempts the vessel was finally scrapped in 2012.

Image	Ship	Built (Commissioned)	Tonnage	Notes
King Orry	King Orry [IV]	November 1945 (January 1946)	2,485 GT	Scrapped at Strood in 1979
Mona's Queen	Mona's Queen [IV]	February 1946 (June 1946)	2,485 GT	Sold for further use as Fiesta; Scrapped at Perama in 1981
RMS Tynwald	Tynwald [V]	March 1947 (July 1947)	2,487 GT	Scrapped at Aviles in 1975
Snaefell	Snaefell [V]	March 1948 (July 1948)	2,489 GT	Scrapped at Blyth in 1978
Mona's Isle	Mona's Isle [V]	October 1950 (March 1951)	2,491 GT	Scrapped in the Netherlands in 1980
Manxman	Manxman [II]	February 1955 (May 1955)	2,495 GT	Scrapped at Sunderland in 2012

=== Side-loading car ferries ===
The company developed a design of side-loading car ferries, with a spiral ramp at the stern. These could operate (as car ferries) from ports which were not equipped with linkspans. This design is still unique to the Isle of Man Steam Packet Company today. They operated from Douglas to various ports.

Image	Ship	Built (Commissioned)	Tonnage	Notes
Manx Maid	Manx Maid [II]	January 1962 (May 1962)	2,724 GT	Scrapped at Garston in 1986
Ben-my-Chree	Ben-my-Chree [V]	December 1965 (May 1966)	2,762 GT	Scrapped at Santander in 1989
The "Mona's Queen"	Mona's Queen [V]	December 1971 (May 1972)	2,998 GT	Sold for further use as Mary the Queen; Scrapped at Alang in 2008
Lady of Mann	Lady of Mann [II]	December 1975 (June 1976)	3,083 GT	Sold for further use as Panagia Soumela; Scrapped at Aliaga in 2011

=== Roll-on/roll-off ferries ===
The company has operated a number of roll-on/roll-off passenger and freight ferries in its history, the pioneering vessel being the Peveril [IV] in 1981, in response to Manx Line's Manx Viking.

Image	Ship	Built (Commissioned)	Route	Tonnage	Notes
	Mona's Isle [VI]	May 1966 (April 1985)	Douglas — Heysham	4,657 GT	Sold for further use as Al Fahad; Sunk off Jeddah in 2004
Tynwald	Tynwald [VI]	April 1967 (October 1985)	Douglas — Heysham	3,762 GT	Sold for further use as Lauro Express; Scrapped at Alang in 2007
	King Orry [VI]	February 1972 (February 1990)	Douglas — Heysham; Douglas — Liverpool	4,649 GT	Sold for further use as Moby Love; Still in service
	Peveril [IV]	January 1971 (May 1981)	Douglas — various	1,975 GT	Sold for further use in 2000; Believed scrapped
	Manx Viking	August 1974 (1976)	Douglas — Heysham	3,589 GT	Scrapped at Sault Ste. Marie, Canada
	Belard	April 1979 (November 1993)	Various	1,599 GT	Sold for further use as Muirneag; Still in service

=== Fastcraft ===
The company has operated fastcraft since 1993.

Ship	Name	Built (In service)	Routes	Notes
	Emeraude France	October 1990 (March 2007)	Douglas — Liverpool/Belfast/Dublin	Chartered in 2007
	SeaCat Danmark	January 1991 (May 1998)	Douglas — Liverpool/Belfast/Dublin	Chartered between 1998 and 2000; Now operating as Atlantic Express
	SeaCat Rapide	February 1996 (June 2004)	Douglas — various	Chartered in 2004; Now operating as Jaume II
	Snaefell [VI]	April 1991 (May 1994)	Douglas — Liverpool/Belfast/Dublin	Chartered to Seajets in Greece in 2011; Now operating as Master Jet
	SuperSeaCat Three	March 1999 (2000)	Douglas — various	Now operating as Speedrunner III
	Viking [II]	June 1997 (March 2003)	Douglas — Liverpool/Belfast/Dublin	Chartered 2003–2008; Now operating as Hellenic Wind

== See also ==
- SS Ellan Vannin
- HMS Ben-my-Chree
