= SS Ben-my-Chree (1965) =

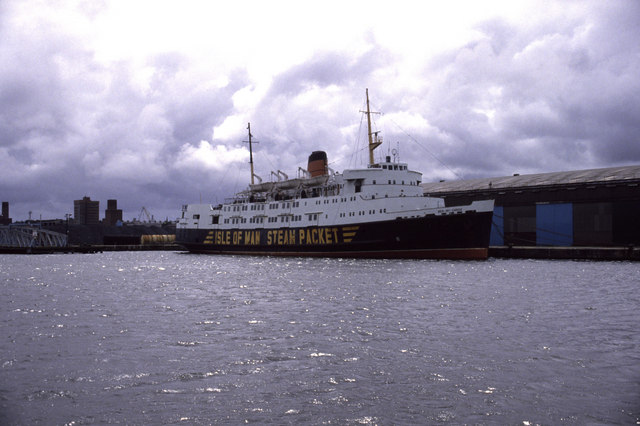
- Ben-my-Chree at East Float, Wallasey Docks.

History
- Name: Ben-my-Chree
- Owner: 1966–1984: IOMSPCo.
- Operator: 1966–1984: IOMSPCo.
- Port of registry: Douglas, Isle of Man; 1985: Liverpool
- Route: Douglas to Liverpool / Dublin / Belfast / Ardrossan / Fleetwood / Heysham.
- Ordered: 1964
- Builder: Cammell Laird
- Cost: £1,400,000 (£23,702,138 in 2025).
- Yard number: 1320
- Launched: Friday, 10 December 1965
- Maiden voyage: 12 May 1966
- Out of service: September 1984 (Re-chartered May 1985. Finally laid up June 1985)
- Identification: IMO number: 6602707; Official Number 186355; Code Letters G R X Y
- Nickname(s): "The Ben"
- Fate: Scrapped at Santander, Spain, 1989

General characteristics
- Type: Car Ferry
- Tonnage: 2,762 gross register tons (GRT)
- Length: 325 ft 0 in (99.1 m)
- Beam: 50 ft 0 in (15.2 m)
- Draught: 12 ft 6 in (3.8 m)
- Depth: 18 ft 0 in (5.5 m)
- Decks: 6
- Deck clearance: 8 ft 0 in (2.4 m) with a clear height of 7 ft 2 in (2.2 m) on the car deck and ramps
- Ramps: Side loading spiral ramps over 5 levels
- Installed power: 9,500 shp (7,100 kW)
- Propulsion: Twin fixed 3 bladed screws Pametrada geared turbines developing 9,500 shp (7,100 kW)
- Speed: 21 knots (24 mph)
- Capacity: 1400 passengers 80 cars or light vans
- Crew: 60

TSS (RMS) Ben-my-Chree (V) was the second of four side-loading car ferries ordered by the Isle of Man Steam Packet Company. Built in 1965, she was the last of their vessels designed with two classes of passenger accommodation and the fifth company vessel to bear the name. She operated until 1984 and was broken up in 1989. Fitted with steam turbines, she was the last steam powered vessel built for the Isle of Man Steam Packet Company.

== History ==
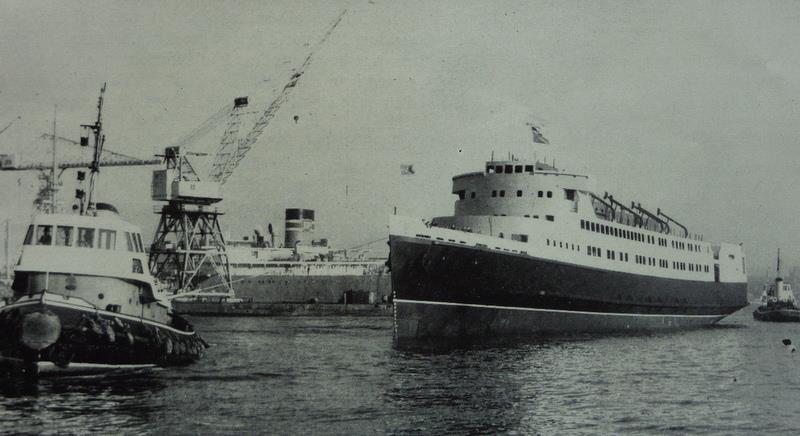
Ben-my-Chree is launched at Birkenhead, Friday, 10 December 1965

Ben-my-Chree (No.186355) was constructed by Cammell Laird at a cost of £1,400,000 (equivalent to £23,702,138 in 2025). She was the second of four car ferries ordered by the Isle of Man Steam Packet Company and was virtually identical to her sister Manx Maid, built four years earlier.

She was launched by Mrs Margaret Brownsdon on Friday, 10 December 1965, and entered service, having gone through her trials and been accepted, with Capt J.E. Quirk in command and J.S. Kennaugh as Chief Officer. Ben-my-Chree made her maiden voyage from Liverpool to Douglas on Thursday, 12 May 1966. This was a happy occasion for the Steam Packet, for as the "Ben" slipped away from the Prince's Landing Stage and proceeded downstream towards the sea, she received a rousing salute from her sister Manx Maid, lying alongside the Liverpool terminal.

The IOMSPCo Ltd's attitude and relationship with the Isle of Man Harbour Board bore significantly in the construction of the Manx Maid and Ben-My-Chree, as they were unable to agree to the building of, and who would pay the costs of linkspans required for a new RO-RO. However, it did result in a notable design that served the Isle of Man very successfully till the demise of the Lady of Mann in 2005. Ultimately what scrapped these notable streamlined, whilst archaic ships, was not their inability, more their lack of efficiency as the economy of operating turbine steamers was eclipsed by motor vessels.

Their nicknames by Steam Packet staff for both the "Maid" and the "Ben" in the 1960s and 1970s were "the money boxes", as they gained the Steam Packet all its profits through the carriage of cars and vans.

== Layout ==
Ben-my-Chree was the last of the company's ships designed with two classes of passenger accommodation.

She only operated in this configuration until the beginning of 1967, when all the company's ships, including Ben-my-Chree, were converted to single class. The two-class system had been employed for 136 years.

Length 325'; beam 50'; and a depth of 18'; with accommodation for 1400 passengers and a crew of 60.

Ben-my-Chree had a Gross tonnage of 2762 and a designed service speed of 21 knots. The machinery lay-out was similar to Manx Maid, developing 9,500 shp (7,100 kW) shaft horse power.

During her annual overhaul in 1978, she was fitted with a bow thruster, driven by a steam turbine of 500 brake horse power. Also at this time, she was fitted with the ship's whistle from the scrapped Tynwald, a traditional organ type whistle, whose mighty reverberation was very much appreciated by lovers of Manx ships.

== Service life ==
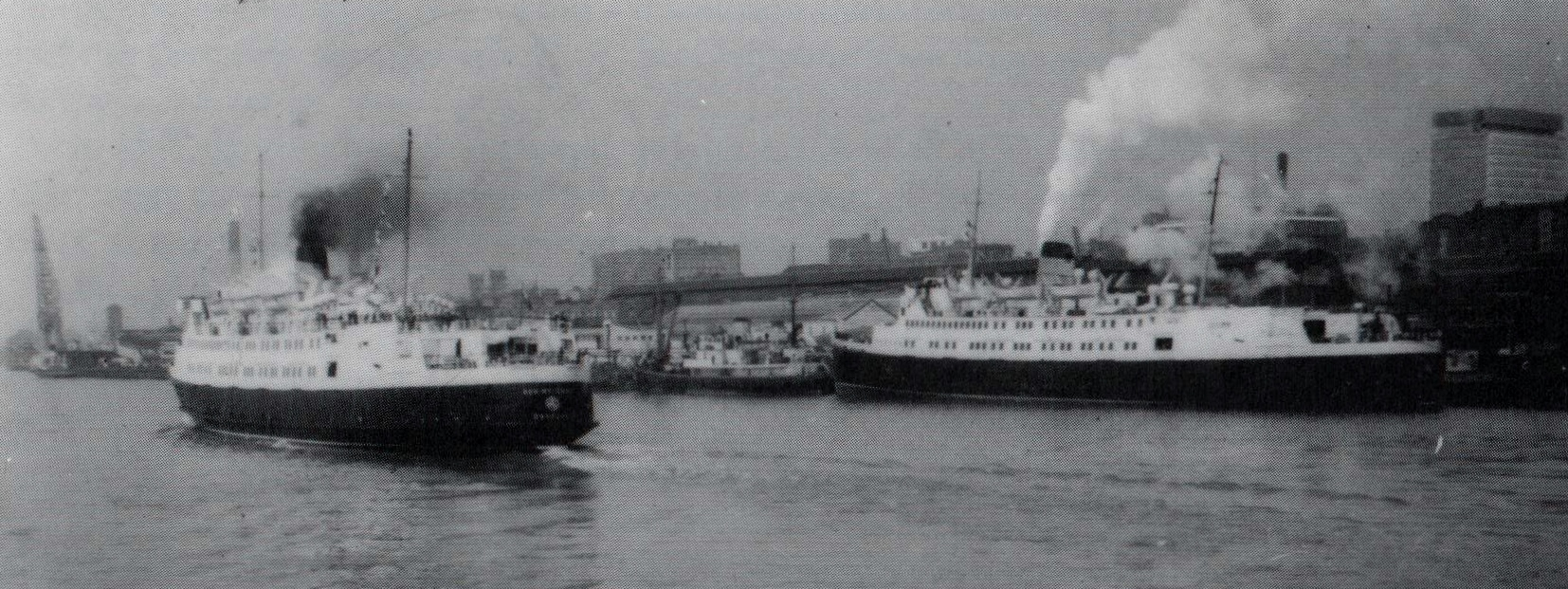
A happy Steam Packet occasion on the Mersey, as Manx Maid (right) greets her new sister Ben-my-Chree (left) as she departs on her maiden voyage to Douglas, Thursday May 12th, 1966.

"The Ben", as she was always known, entered service in 1966, the year of the seaman's strike. This resulted in her being laid up for the first part of the summer. She serviced the main Douglas-Liverpool route on her own for part of April 1975 while Mona's Queen was having her annual overhaul, and Manx Maid was forced to be idle through an industrial dispute.

She was generally one of the winter boats i.e. out of Douglas at 09:00, and back at 11:00 from Liverpool the following day until the Lady of Mann entered service. The winter job, and the boats that did it were sought after by the ratings, as they earned more sailing than when laid up.

== Disposal ==
During the early 1980s, as a result of the formation of Manxline with its RO-RO vessel Manx Viking, the side-loading car ferries of the Steam Packet were seen as becoming increasingly inefficient, and the decision was made to retire both the Manx Maid and the Ben-my-Chree. Whilst their higher fuel consumption would initially be seen as the cost to dispose, the reality was the steam plants were very expensive to maintain, and just not as efficient. The Steamers averaged 9 tons of fuel on a Douglas - Liverpool trip whilst the motor ships Mona's Queen and Lady of Mann less than 4. A 30% price increase in heavy-grade fuel oil during 1984, finally rendered the vessels as totally uneconomic.

Ben-my-Chree made her final voyage under Steam Packet ownership on 19 September 1984, ten days after her older sister. However, this wasn't quite the end for her, and in June 1985 she was chartered back from her new owners to cover the shortfall in capacity for the busy TT motorcycle races. Ben-my-Chree was finally laid up by Capt. Hall in Vittoria Dock, Birkenhead, on 10 June 1985.

The withdrawal of the Ben-my-Chree marked the end of steam turbine vessels with the Isle of Man Steam Packet Company, with internal combustion engines being used on all of the company’s subsequent ships.

In August 1989, she was sold to Spanish breakers Cantabra Metallurgica S.A. Santander broke her up, still with the name Ben-my-Chree between 18 September and 4 December 1989.

== Gallery ==
RMS Ben-my-Chree
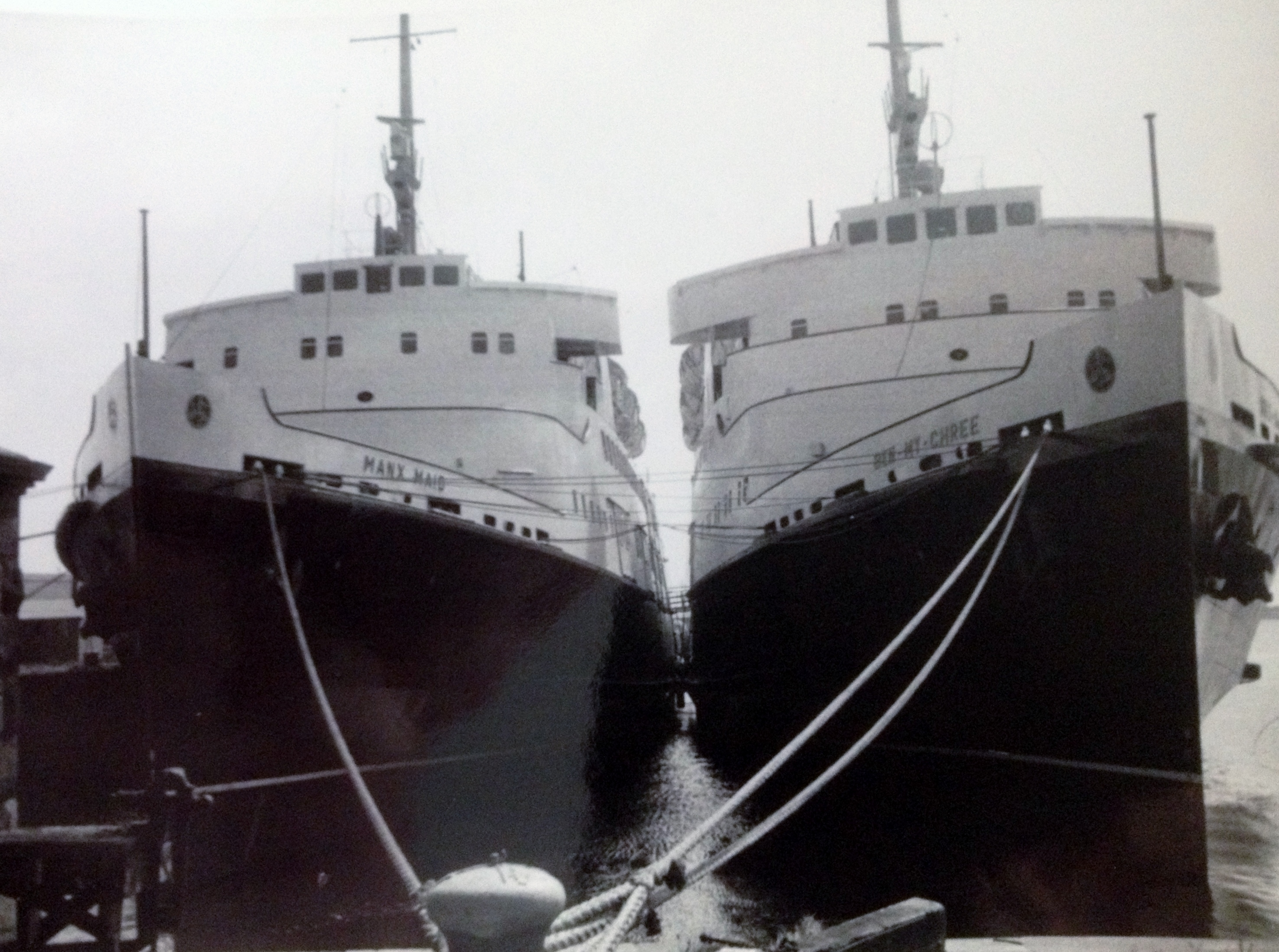
Manx Maid and Ben-my-Chree during their winter lay-up at Birkenhead
