= SS Tynwald (1947) =

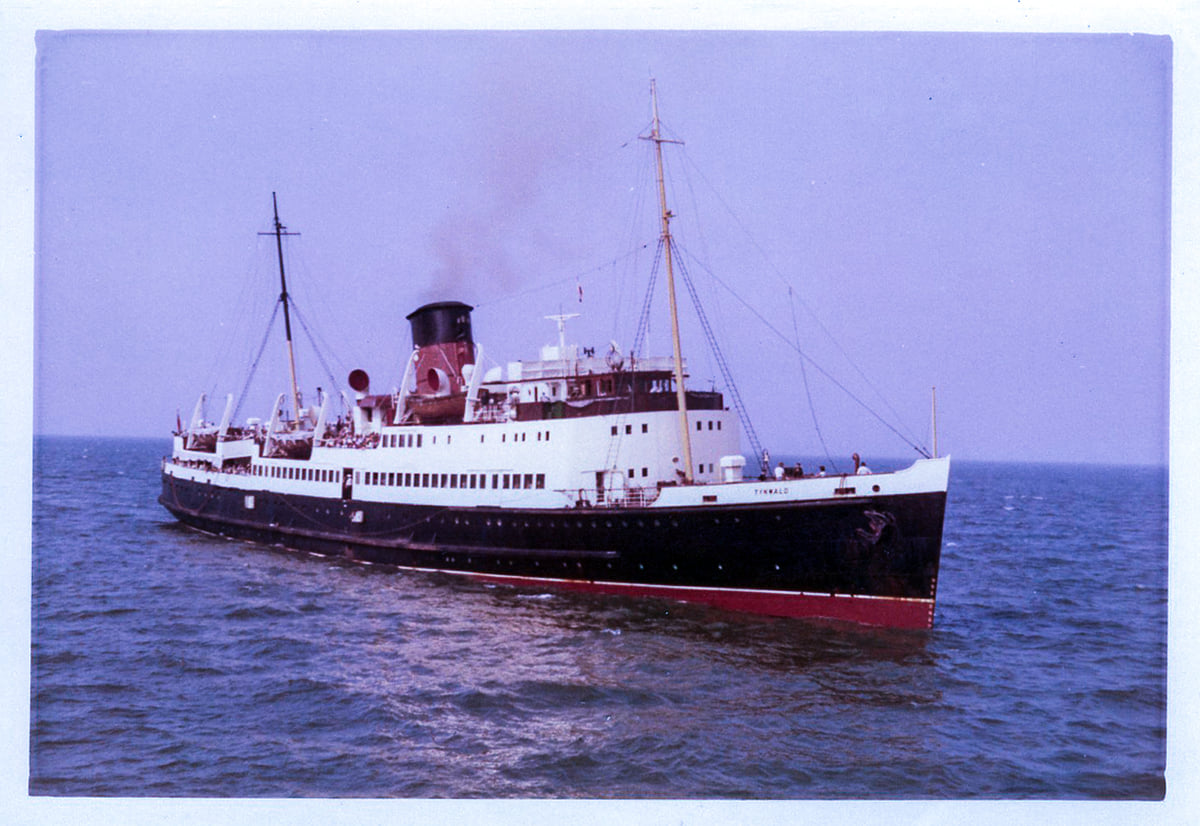
- Tynwald

History
- Name: Tynwald
- Owner: 1947–1974: IOMSPCo.
- Operator: 1947–1974: IOMSPCo.
- Port of registry: Douglas, Isle of Man.
- Builder: Cammell Laird
- Cost: £461,859 (equivalent to £22,800,000 in 2023).
- Yard number: 1184
- Way number: 165284
- Launched: 24 July 1947
- Maiden voyage: 31 July 1947
- Out of service: August 1974
- Identification: IMO number: 165284
- Fate: Scrapped at Avtles, Spain, 1975

General characteristics
- Type: King Orry Class Passenger Steamer.
- Tonnage: 2,490 gross register tons (GRT)
- Length: 345 feet (105 m)
- Beam: 47 feet (14 m)
- Depth: 18 feet (5.5 m)
- Installed power: 8,500 shp (6,300 kW)
- Propulsion: Twin Parsons single reduction turbines; developing 8,500 shp (6,300 kW)
- Speed: 21 knots (39 km/h; 24 mph)
- Capacity: 2393 passengers
- Crew: 68

TSS (RMS) Tynwald (V), No. 165248, was a passenger vessel operated by the Isle of Man Steam Packet Company from 1947 to 1974, and was the fifth vessel in the history of the line to bear the name.

== History ==
Tynwald was built by Cammell Laird at Birkenhead in 1947, at a cost of £461,859 (equivalent to £22,800,000 in 2023).

The third of the six sisters, Tynwald was virtually identical to her two predecessors King Orry and Mona's Queen except for her tonnage, which was 2490. Her dimensions, speed and horsepower, also crew accommodation, matched the Snaefell and Mona's Isle.

== Incidents ==
There was one accident in her history when she sank the barge Elanor in the Mersey on 25 February 1952.

== Service life and disposal ==
She was popular and considered to have done a very sound job for the company, and she continued to give service until August 1974, when she was withdrawn from the fleet. By then, the company's newer car ferries were taking the bulk of the passenger traffic, and therefore it was viable to reduce the number of passenger vessels from seven to six.

Tynwald was sold to John Cashmore of Newport, Mons. for £57,000 (equivalent to £604,000 in 2023), and resold to Spanish breakers who demolished her at Avtles in February 1975.

Her ship's whistle was retained by the company, and to the delight of lovers of Manx ships, was fitted to the car ferry Ben-my-Chree during her winter overhaul in 1978.
