= TSS Manx Maid (1962) =

Ship built in 1962

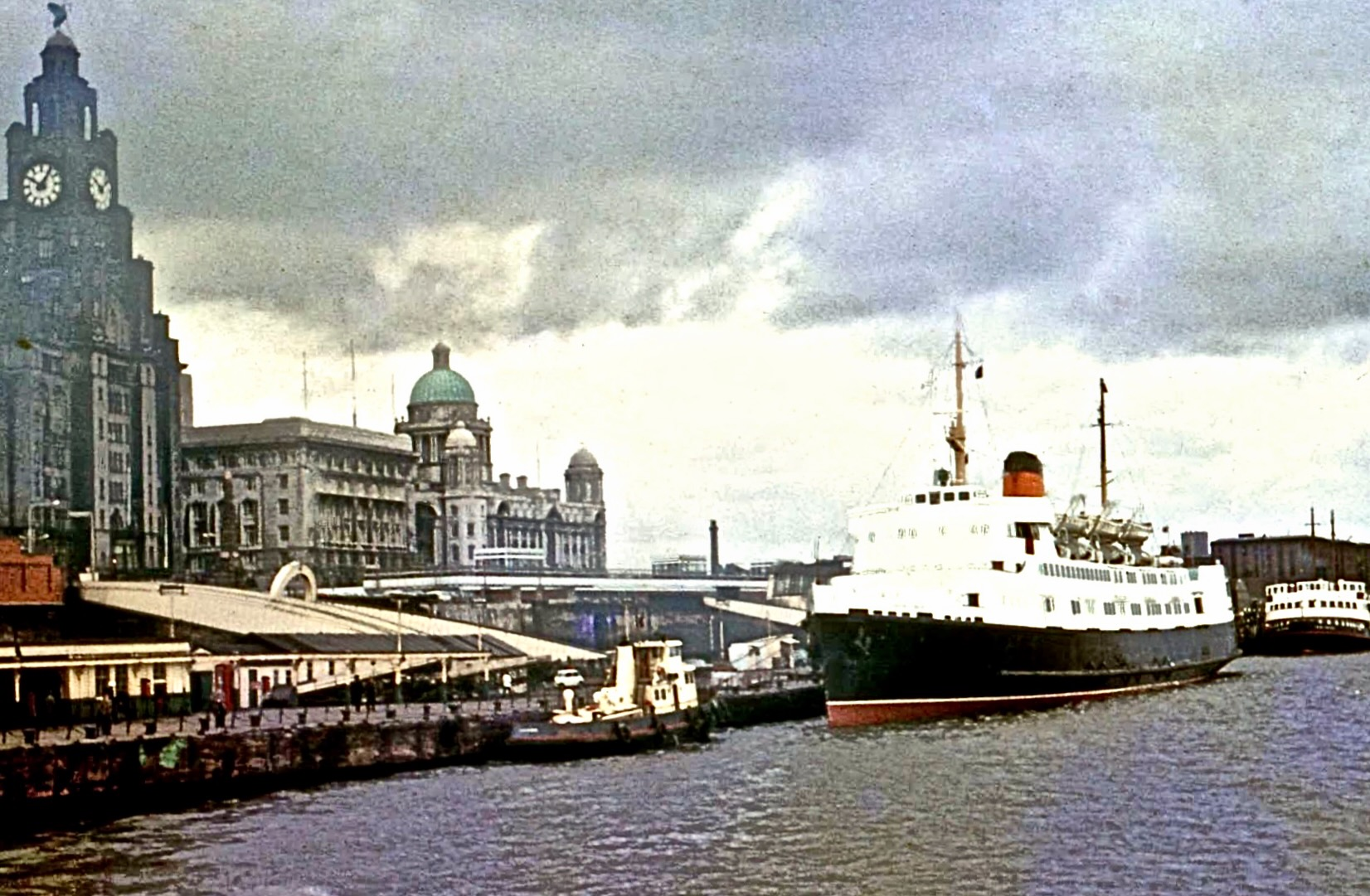
- Manx Maid at Prince's Landing Stage in 1971

History
- Name: Manx Maid
- Owner: 1962–1984: IOMSPCo.
- Operator: 1962–1984: IOMSPCo.
- Port of registry: Douglas, Isle of Man
- Builder: Cammell Laird
- Cost: £1,087,000
- Launched: 23 January 1962
- Maiden voyage: 23 May 1962
- Out of service: September 1984
- Identification: IMO number: 5219931; Code Letters: G H X Y
- Nickname(s): The Maid
- Fate: Scrapped, 1986

General characteristics
- Type: Car Ferry
- Tonnage: 2,724 gross register tons (GRT)
- Length: 325 ft 0 in (99.1 m)
- Beam: 50 ft 0 in (15.2 m)
- Depth: 18 ft 0 in (5.5 m)
- Decks: 6
- Deck clearance: 8 ft 0 in (2.4 m) with a clear height of 7 ft 2 in (2.2 m) on the car deck and ramps
- Ramps: Side loading spiral ramps over 5 levels
- Installed power: 9,500 shp (7,100 kW)
- Propulsion: Twin fixed 3 bladed screws Pametrada geared turbines
- Speed: 21 knots (39 km/h)
- Capacity: 1400 passengers 90 cars and light commercial vans.
- Crew: 60

TSS (RMS) Manx Maid (II) was built by Cammell Laird at Birkenhead in 1962, and was the second ship in the Company's history to bear the name.

== Dimensions ==
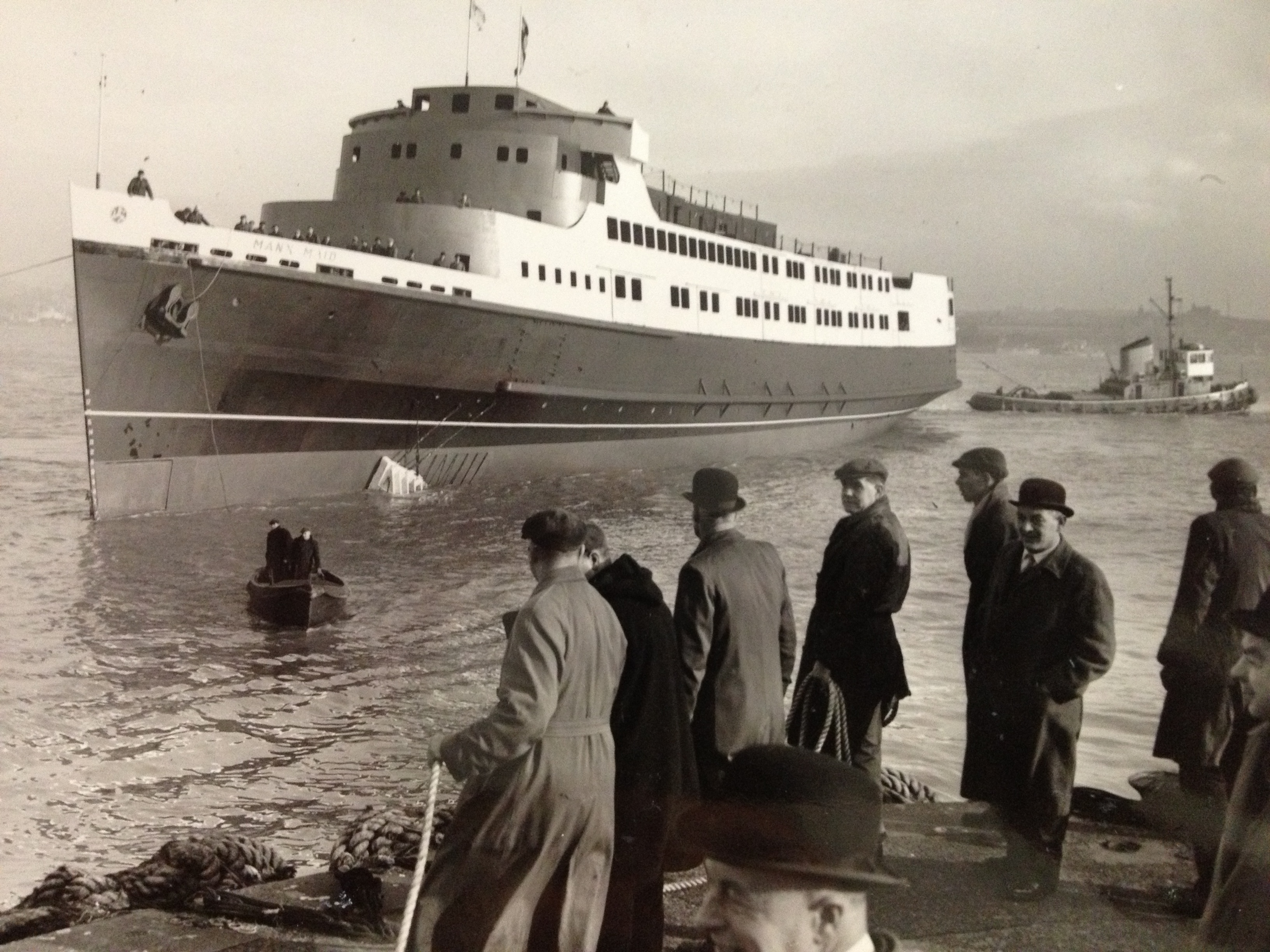
Launch of Manx Maid, 23 January 1962

Tonnage 2724; length 325'; beam 50'; depth 18'; speed 21 knots; bhp 9,500. Construction costs were £1,087,000, the first vessel of the Isle of Man Steam Packet Company to cost over one million pounds.

Manx Maid was launched by Mrs. A. Alexander at Birkenhead, on Tuesday 23 January 1962.

== Service life ==
The "Maid", as she was always affectionately known, was certified for 1400 passengers and a crew of 60. In engineering terms she was very similar to her predecessor Manxman except for Babcock & Wilcox integral furnace boilers, installed instead of the sectional header type.

Manx Maid was a great success and was of major importance in the history of the Isle of Man Steam Packet Company, as she was the first vessel to be designed as a car ferry; she had the capacity for up to 90 cars and light commercial vans.

The design principle for vehicle loading was simple. A spiral set of ramps at the stern linked with the car deck, so that vehicles could be driven on or off from the appropriate level on departure or arrival. This patented system of ramps facilitated loading and unloading at any state of the tide, at any of the ports served by the company.

Cars had been carried to the Isle of Man for many years prior to Manx Maid's arrival, but with the tidal range at Douglas being considerable, it necessitated taking the vehicle on and off by crane, a slow and irksome process. Consequently, the carriage of cars had never reached large proportions.

The decision to construct a new generation of car-ferrying vessels was taken by the company in 1959, and in 1960 a contract was placed with Cammell Laird.

Manx Maid was launched on 23 January 1962. The design of the 'side-loader' with a spiral ramp at the stern was a unique feature of the Steam Packet Company's car ferries (Manx Maid, Ben-my-Chree, Mona's Queen and Lady of Mann). She was the first Company vessel to be fitted with anti-roll stabilisers.

In November 1974 Manx Maid collided with the Fort Ann Jetty in Douglas Harbour during rough conditions. No one was hurt in the collision, but the vessel had to be dry-docked at Birkenhead. During her repairs she was the focus of an industrial dispute and only returned to service on 27 May 1975, just in time for the busy T.T. Period.

Manx Maid was the thirteenth vessel built for the Steam Packet by Cammell Laird; since the first was delivered by the yard in 1910. In 1979 Manx Maid was fitted with a 500 horsepower bow thruster mechanism, similar to that fitted to her younger sister Ben-my-Chree the previous winter.

== Disposal ==
With the introduction of Manx Line's ro-ro service (operated by MV Manx Viking) between Douglas and Heysham, the inefficiency of the Steam Packet's side-loading car ferries became increasingly apparent, and the decision was made to retire both the Manx Maid and her younger sister Ben-my-Chree. Whilst their higher fuel consumption would initially be seen as the cost to dispose, the reality was the steam plants were very expensive to maintain, and just not as efficient. The Steamers averaged 9 tons of fuel on a Douglas - Liverpool trip whilst the motor ships Mona's Queen and Lady of Mann less than 4.

After over 20 years of reliable service, Manx Maid made her final sailing from Douglas on Sunday 9 September 1984, ten days before her younger sister. The withdrawal of these two ships marked the end of steam turbine vessels with the Isle of Man Steam Packet Company, with internal combustion engines used on all of the company’s subsequent ships.

== Gallery ==
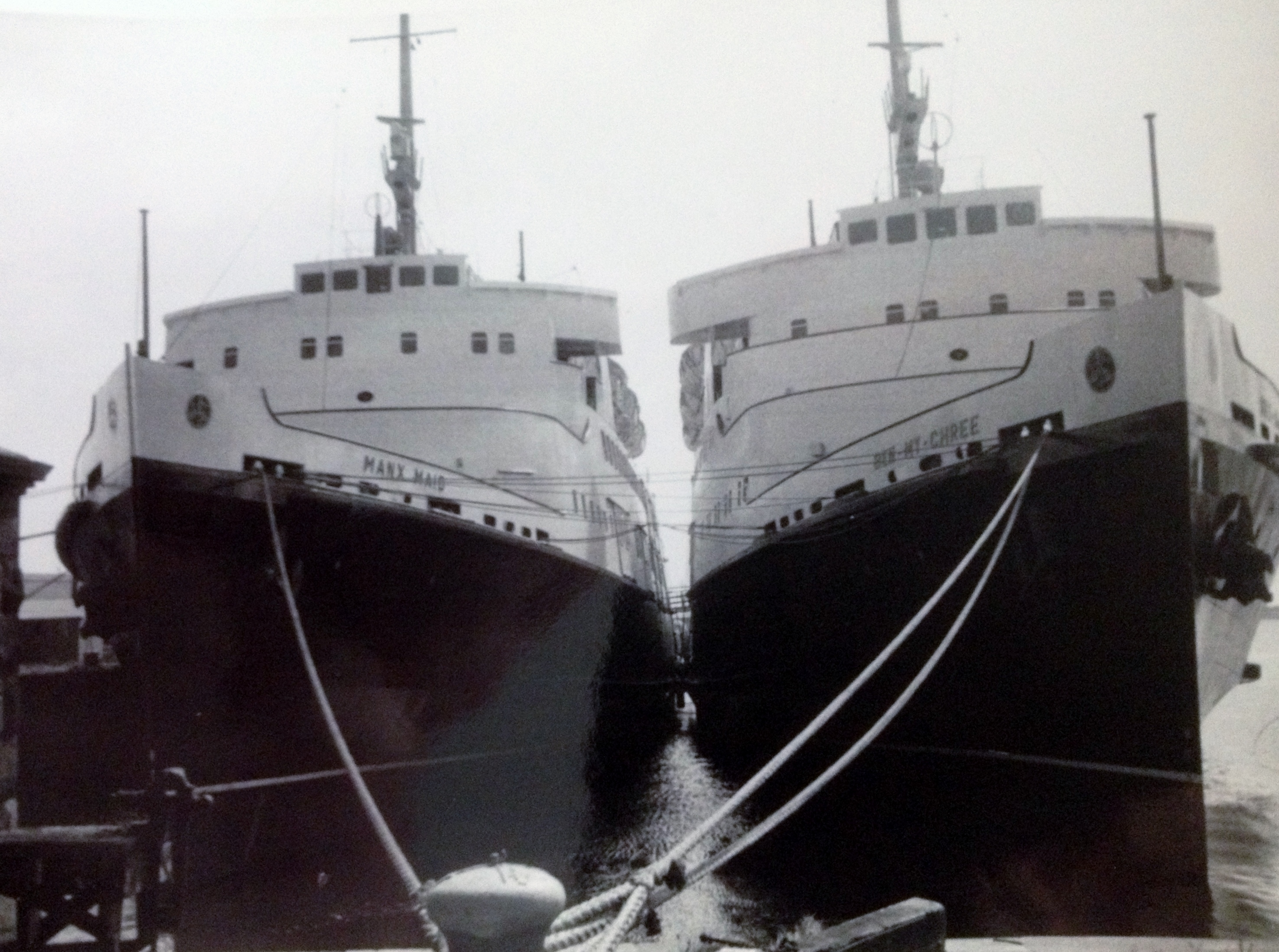
Manx Maid and her twin sister Ben-my-Chree, pictured during their winter lay-up at Birkenhead.

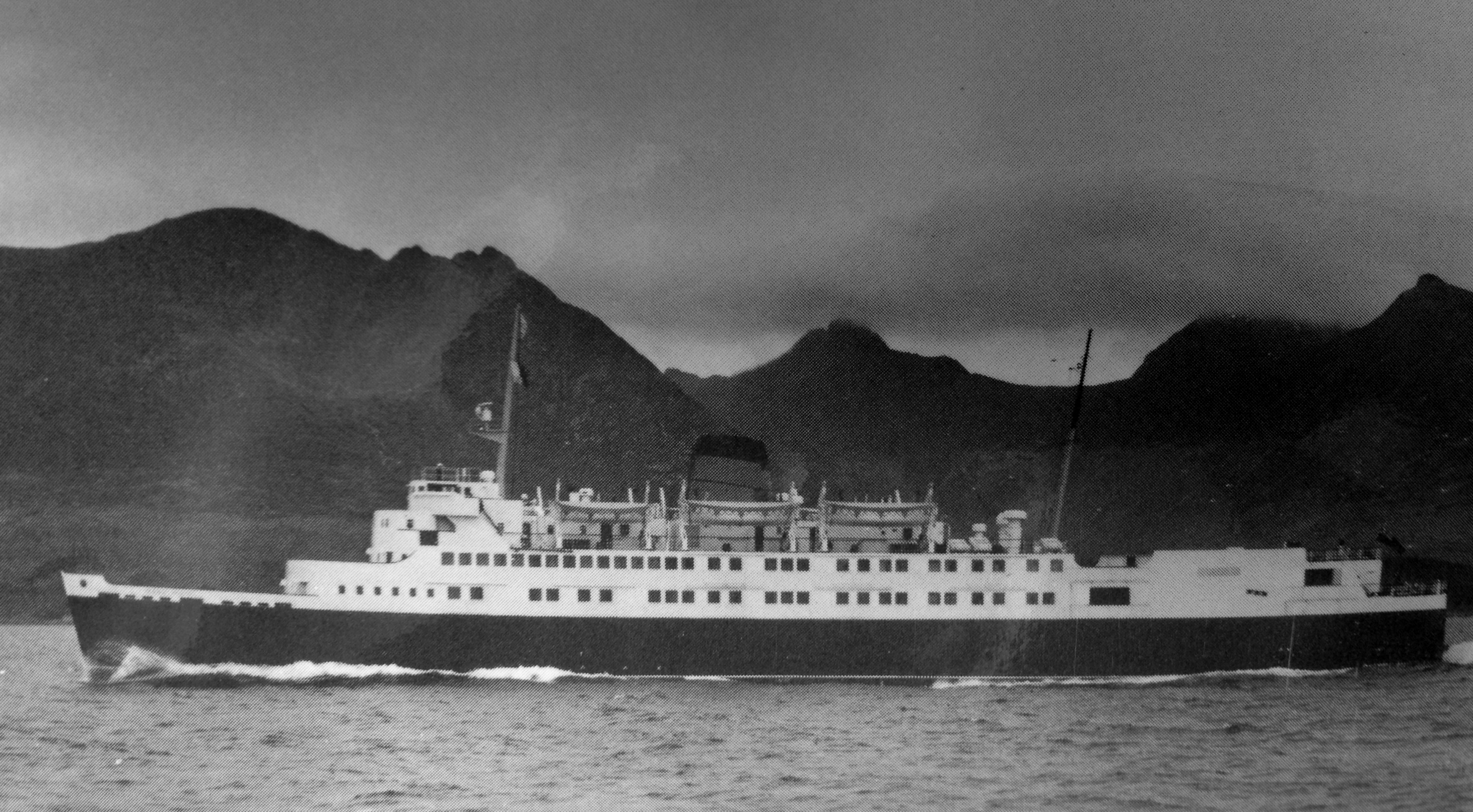
Manx Maid pictured on her Sea Trials
