= MV Conister =

Cargo vessel

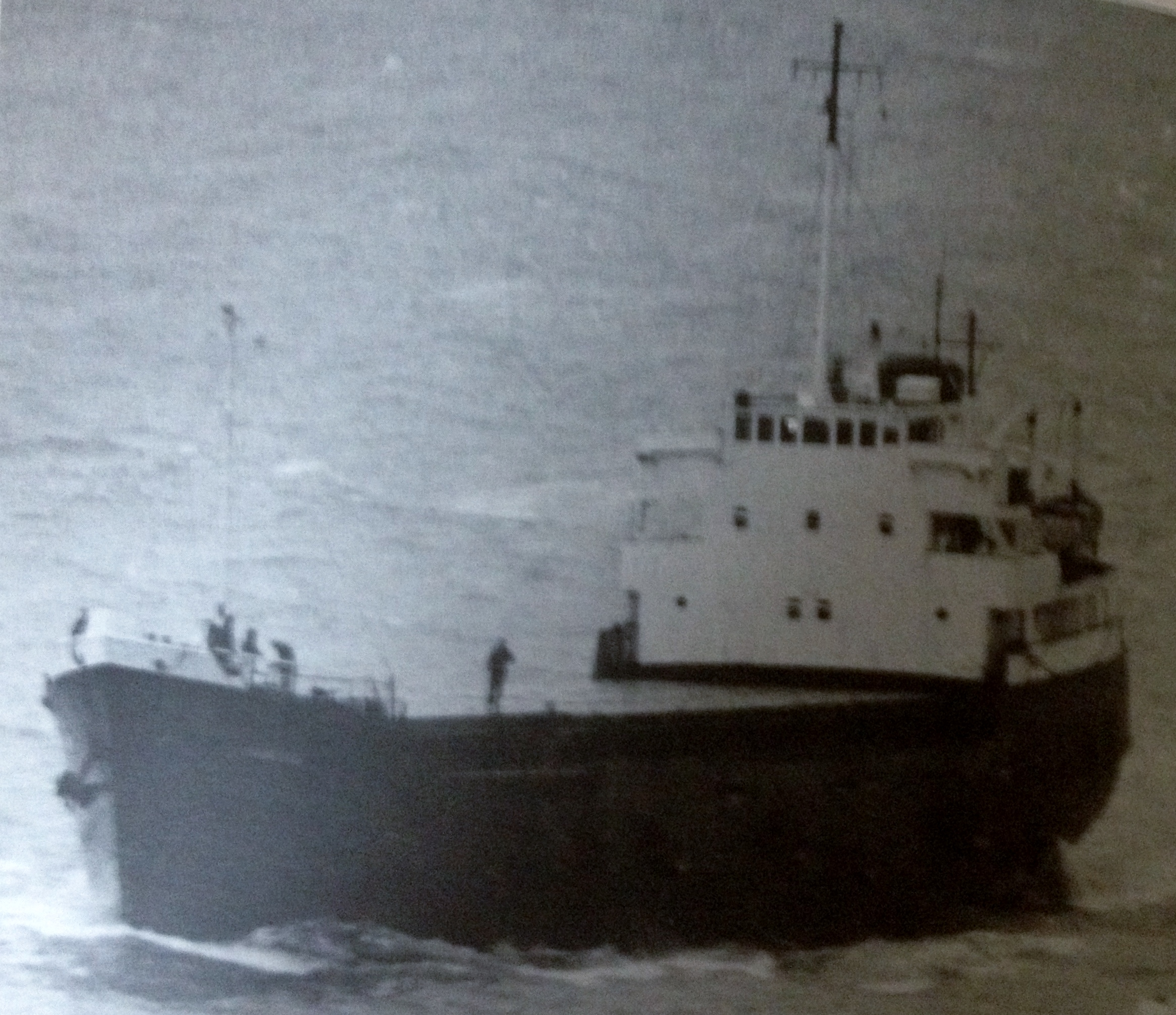
- Conister

History
- Name: Conister; 1955-1972 MV Brentfield; 1972-1973 MV Spaniel
- Owner: 1955-58 Zillah Shipping & Trading Co Ltd, Liverpool; 1958-65 Coast Lines Ltd, Liverpool; 1965-68 Burns & Laird Lines Ltd, Glasgow; 1968-70 Coast Lines Ltd, Liverpool; 1970-72 Coast Lines (Services) Ltd, Liverpool; 1972-1973 Belfast Steamship Company; 1973-1981: Isle of Man Steam Packet Company
- Operator: 1955-58 Zillah Shipping & Trading Co Ltd, Liverpool; 1958-65 Coast Lines Ltd, Liverpool; 1965-68 Burns & Laird Lines Ltd, Glasgow; 1968-70 Coast Lines Ltd, Liverpool; 1970-72 Coast Lines (Services) Ltd, Liverpool; 1972-1973 Belfast Steamship Company; 1973-1981: Isle of Man Steam Packet Company
- Port of registry: Douglas, Isle of Man
- Builder: George Brown & Co. Greenock
- Cost: Not Recorded. Purchased by the Isle of Man Steam Packet Company for a sum of £96,711 in 1973
- Launched: 21 June 1955
- Completed: 1955
- In service: 1955
- Out of service: 1981
- Identification: IMO number: 5336313; Official Number 187114; Code Letters G T V B
- Fate: Scrapped 29 September 1981

General characteristics
- Type: Cargo Ship.
- Tonnage: 891 gross register tons (GRT)
- Length: 208 ft 0 in (63.4 m)
- Beam: 38 ft 0 in (11.6 m)
- Depth: 15 ft 0 in (4.6 m)
- Installed power: 1260 indicated horsepower
- Propulsion: Sulzer 7cyl (360x600mm) 2S.C.SA oil engine, 1260bhp
- Speed: 11 knots (13 mph)
- Capacity: 46 Container Units

MV Conister (II) No. 187114 was a cargo vessel operated by the Isle of Man Steam Packet Company, the second vessel in the Company's history to bear the name.

== Construction and dimensions ==
Conister was a steel; single-screw vessel built by George Brown & Co., at Greenock in 1955.

Length 208'; beam 38'; depth 15'. Conister had a registered tonnage of 891 GRT and was powered by a 7-cylinder T.D.36 Sulzer engine which developed 1,260 indicated horsepower. This gave Conister a service speed of 11 knots.

== Service life ==
The ship entered service with Zillah Shipping & Trading Co Ltd, Liverpool, in 1955 and was named Brentfield.

Brentfield was subsequently sold in 1958 to Coast Lines Ltd, Liverpool, and then in 1965 to Burns & Laird Lines Ltd, Glasgow. Sold back to Coast Lines Ltd in 1968, her services were retained until she was again sold, this time to the Belfast Steamship Company in 1972, and renamed the Spaniel.

In the early 1970s containerization resulted in a marked upsurge in freight business to and from the Isle of Man. In 1973 alone, there was a 31 per cent rise in cargo. It was first expected that Peveril, operating alongside Ramsey would be able to meet this demand and the company sold their other general cargo vessel, Fenella at the beginning of 1973. However, the majority of cargo shipping soon switched to containers, and given Ramsey's deficiencies in handling containerized cargoes, it became apparent that a second container vessel would be needed to expedite matters. The Spaniel was chartered as a container ship by the Steam Packet Company early in 1973, and bought outright by them in November of that year.

The consideration was £96,711 (equivalent to £1,477,301 in 2023); and upon her purchase she was renamed Conister.

== Disposal ==
By the early 1980s it was apparent to the Steam Packet that in order to compete with their then rival Manxline, the introduction of a RO-RO cargo service was necessary. Both Conister and Peveril (III) were put up for sale, and a new cargo vessel NF Jaguar was chartered - this vessel went on to be purchased, and renamed Peveril (IV).

Conister was sold to Asturamerican Shipping Co Inc, Panama, and arrived in Spain on 29 September 1981 for scrapping. She was broken up at San Juan De Nieva, Spain by Desguaces Y Salvamentos S.A.
