= SS Snaefell (1906) =

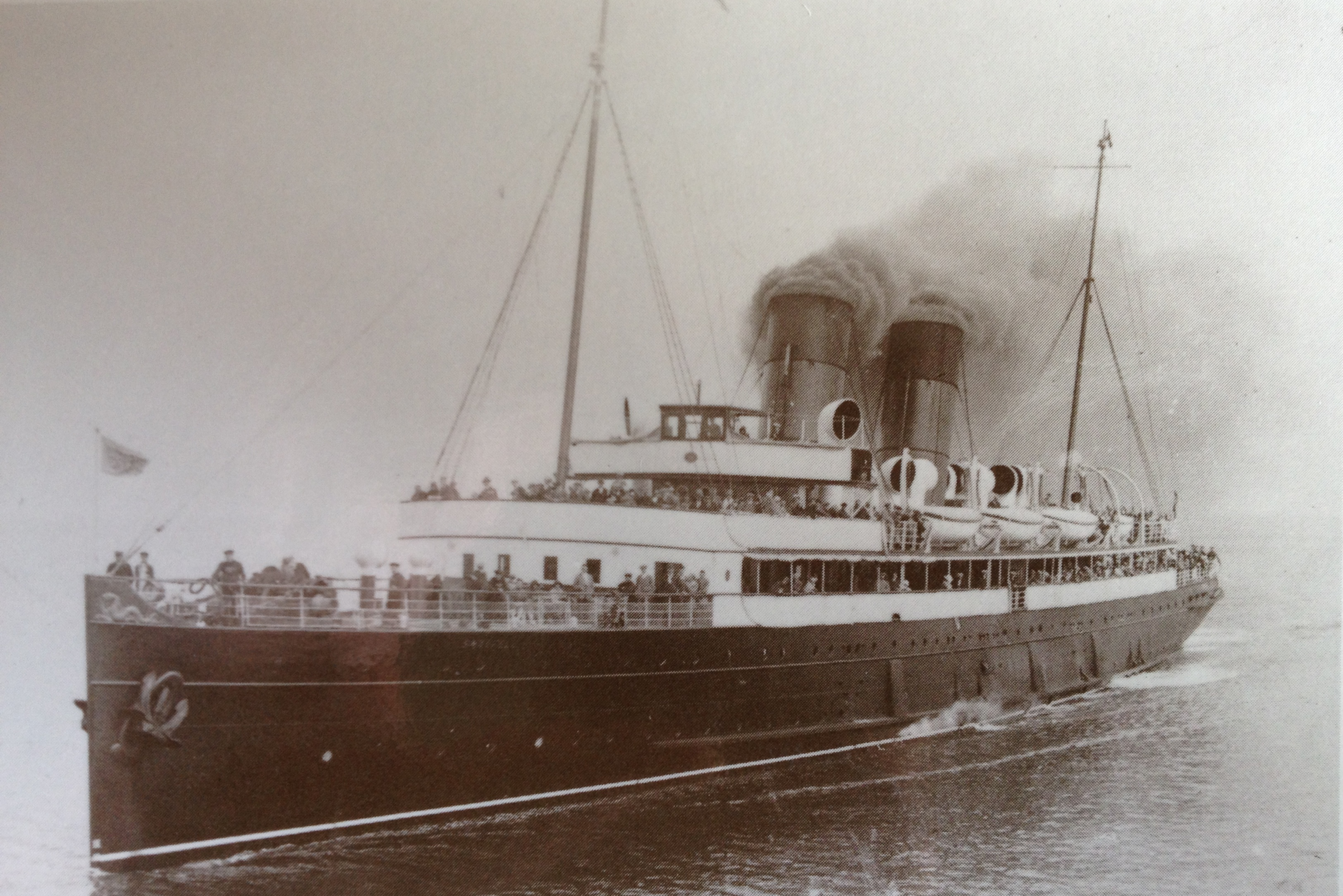
- Snaefell

History
- Name: 1906: Viper; 1920: Snaefell
- Namesake: Snaefell
- Owner: 1906-1920 G. and J. Burns and Co.; 1920–1945: IOMSPCo.
- Operator: 1906-1920 G. and J. Burns and Co.; 1920–1945: IOMSPCo.
- Port of registry: Douglas, Isle of Man
- Builder: Fairfield Shipbuilding and Engineering Company, Govan.
- Yard number: 444
- Launched: 10 March 1906
- Acquired: 22 March 1920
- In service: 1906
- Out of service: 1945
- Identification: UK {official number]] 121331
- Fate: Laid up at Port Glasgow 1945, finally scrapped 1949

General characteristics
- Type: packet steamer
- Tonnage: 1,713 GRT
- Length: 315 feet (96 m)
- Beam: 39 feet 6 inches (12.04 m)
- Depth: 16 feet 6 inches (5.03 m)
- Propulsion: Steam turbine driven screw-propellers
- Speed: 21 knots (39 km/h; 24 mph)
- Capacity: 1,700 passengers
- Crew: 61

SS Snaefell (IV), the fourth ship in the company's history to be so named, was a packet steamer originally owned and operated by G. and J. Burns, who sold her to the Isle of Man Steam Packet Company in 1920.

== Construction and dimensions ==
Originally named Viper built for the Irish Channel service between Scotland and Ireland, she was a steel; triple-screw turbine driven vessel. Viper was built at Govan by Fairfield Shipbuilding and Engineering Company, launched 10 March 1906.

The vessel's dimensions were a length of 315'; beam 39'6"; and depth 16'6". Viper's engines developed 6,500 i.h.p. which gave her a service speed of 21 knots. She had accommodation for 1,700 passengers and a crew of 61.

Viper was purchased by the Steam Packet on 22 March 1920 and renamed Snaefell. The consideration was £160,000.

== Service life ==
Under her original owners, G. and J. Burns, Viper was employed on the company's Ardrossan-Belfast service. Purchased by the Isle of Man Steam Packet Company in 1920, she was renamed Snaefell, and served the numerous routes then operated by the company.

== War service ==
=== First World War ===
Under her original owners, the vessel saw service in the First World War as a troopship. Little is known of her Great War service, but it is fair to assume she was used mainly for trooping duties between the Kent ports, Southampton and the main French port serving the British Expeditionary Force at Le Havre. Viper was one of few transport ships which did not require the protection of an escort as her service speed was judged to provide her with enough protection.

=== Second World War ===
At the outbreak of war, the Steam Packet operated a fleet comprising 16 ships. The Rushen Castle and Snaefell were kept to maintain the Isle of Man's vital link with the mainland, Snaefell primarily as a relief vessel. For a while the Victoria joined them, and the Peveril, Conister and Cushag stayed on to handle freight.

Snaefell was again requisitioned and again used as a troopship, but after one year she was returned to the company and resumed her duty serving the Island's wartime link with the mainland, first to Liverpool and then to Fleetwood.

== Post-war service ==
On the cessation of the war, Snaefell was withdrawn from service in 1945, and sold for breaking.

== Disposal ==
After a life spanning 42 years, Snaefell was finally broken up in 1949. Its wooden staircase bannisters are now included within HQS Wellington in London.

== Gallery ==
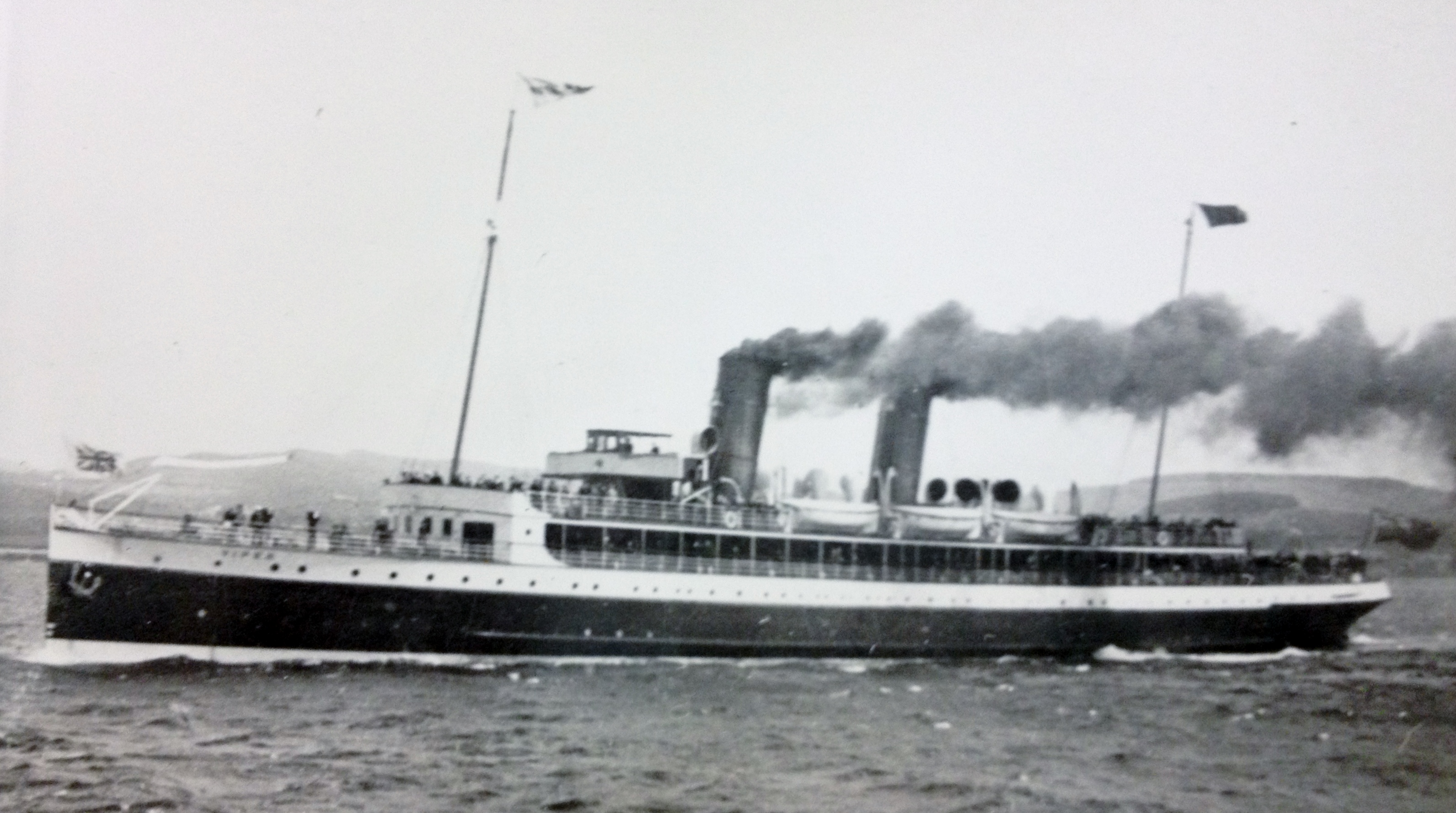
SS Viper

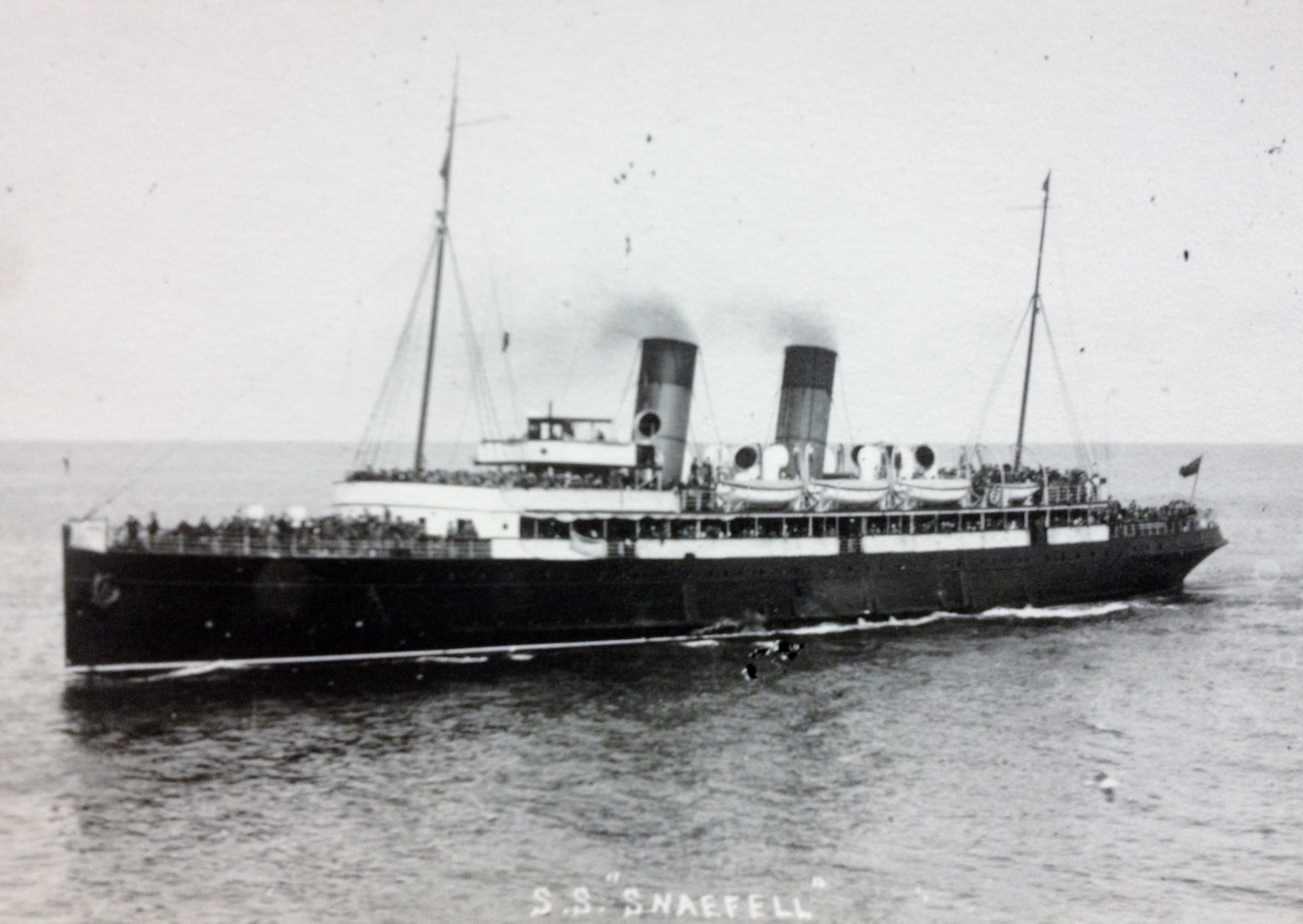
Snaefell approaches Douglas

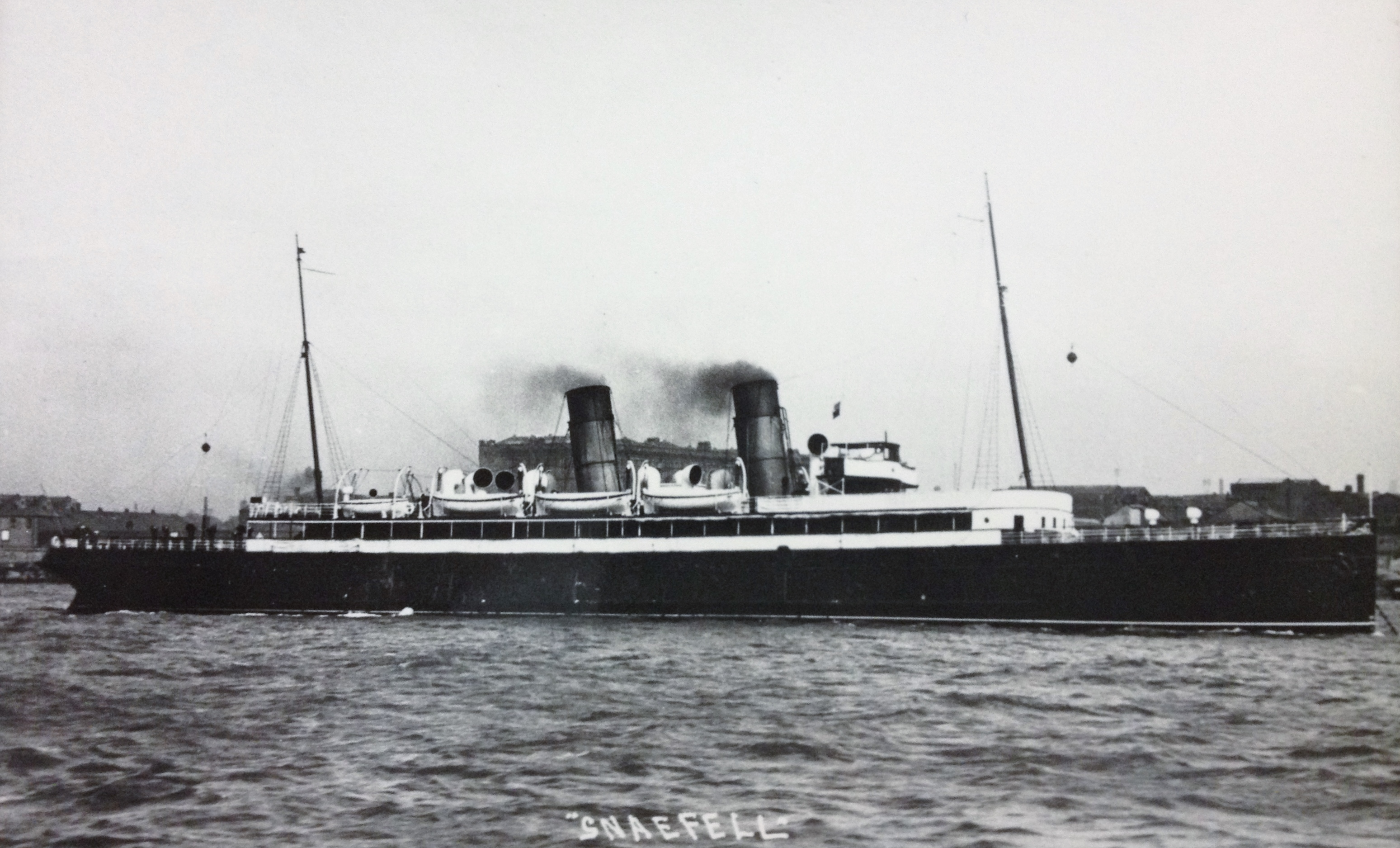
Snaefell in Steam Packet service
