= MV Peveril (1963) =

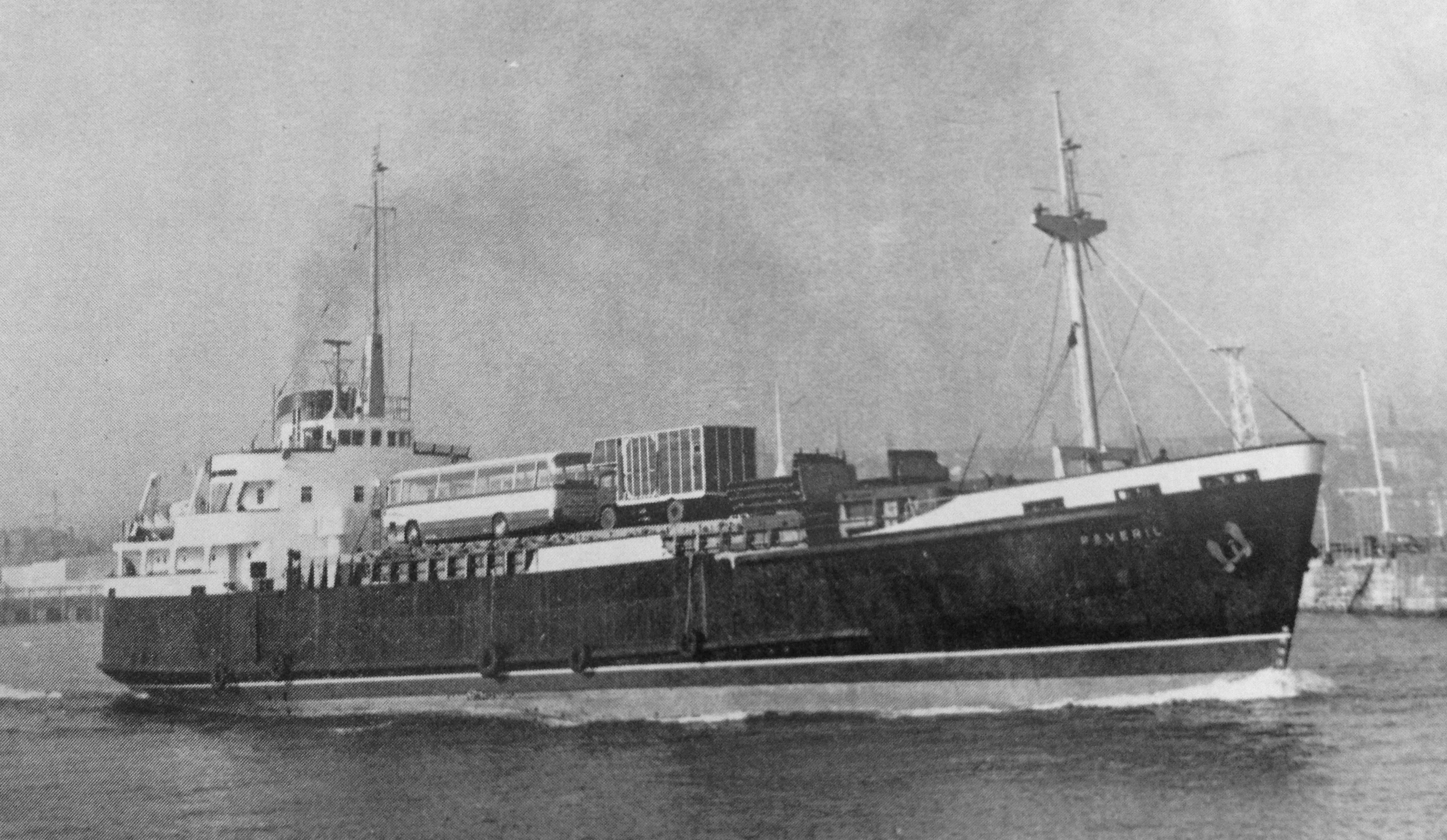
- Peveril departing Douglas, Isle of Man

History
- Name: Peveril (1964-81); Nadalena H (1981); Virginia Luck (1982); Akak Princess (1983); Zeina (1984-85); Akak Star (1986-91); Mariana I (1991); MJK V (1992-99); Ayah (1999-2001)
- Owner: Isle of Man Steam Packet Company (1964-81); Sea Doll Marine Co Ltd, Cyprus (1981-82); Virginia Express Nav Co Ltd, Cyprus (1982-83); Akak Marine Co Ltd, Cyprus (1983-91); Flourishing Marine Ltd, Cyprus (1991-92); G M Khatib R M A Kojok, Lebanon (1992-99); Lebanese Interests (1999 - )
- Operator: Isle of Man Steam Packet Company (1964-1981)
- Port of registry: Douglas, Isle of Man
- Builder: Ailsa Shipbuilding Company, Troon, Scotland
- Cost: £279,921
- Way number: 186353
- Launched: Tuesday, 3 December 1963
- Maiden voyage: Wednesday, 11 March 1964
- In service: 1964
- Out of service: Sold 1981
- Identification: IMO: 6402224 Official Number 186353; Code Letters G M O G
- Fate: Scrapped 2001

General characteristics
- Type: Cargo Vessel
- Tonnage: 1,048 gross register tons (GRT)
- Length: 205 ft (62.48 m)
- Beam: 39 ft (11.89 m)
- Depth: 16 ft 6 in (5.03 m)
- Installed power: 1,400 shp (1,000 kW)
- Propulsion: Diesel-powered single-screw, 7-cylinder British Polar engine, developing 1,400 shp (1,000 kW)
- Speed: 12 knots (22 km/h)
- Crew: 14

MV Peveril was a coastal cargo vessel operated by the Isle of Man Steam Packet Company. Peveril, the third ship in the company's history to bear the name, was built by Ailsa Shipbuilding Company at Troon, Scotland, in 1964.

== Dimensions ==
Peveril was a steel constructed single-screw motor vessel. She had a registered tonnage of 1,048 gross register tons (GRT). She was 205 ft (62.48 m) long, had a beam of 39 ft (11.89 m) and a depth of 16 ft 6 in (5.03 m) and could travel at 12 knots (22 km/h). She cost £279,921 and was fitted with a 7-cylinder British Polar engine, direct-acting, developing 1400 brake horsepower. The vessel had crew accommodation for 14.

== Service life ==
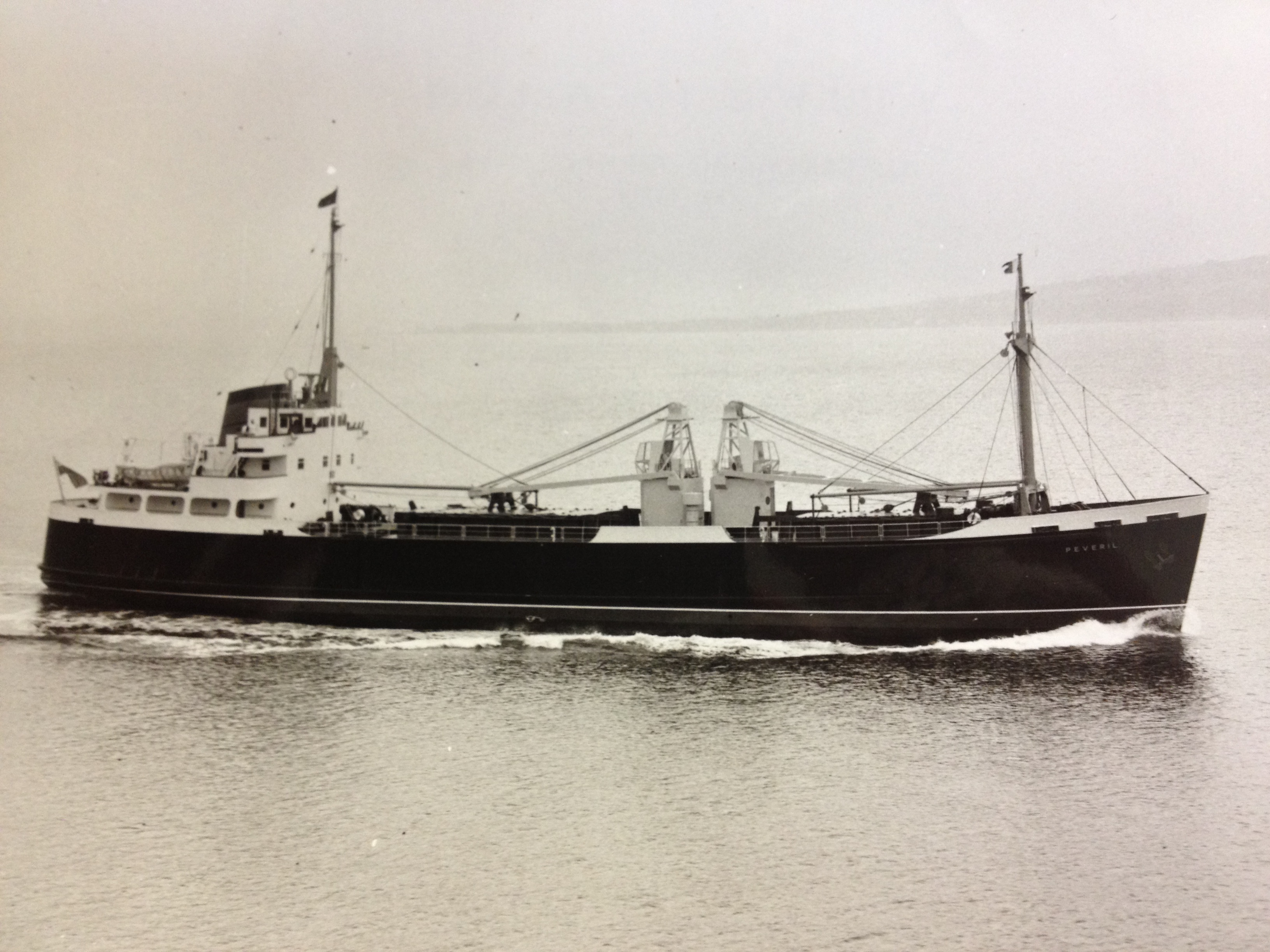
Peveril in original configuration, with her two 10-ton cranes

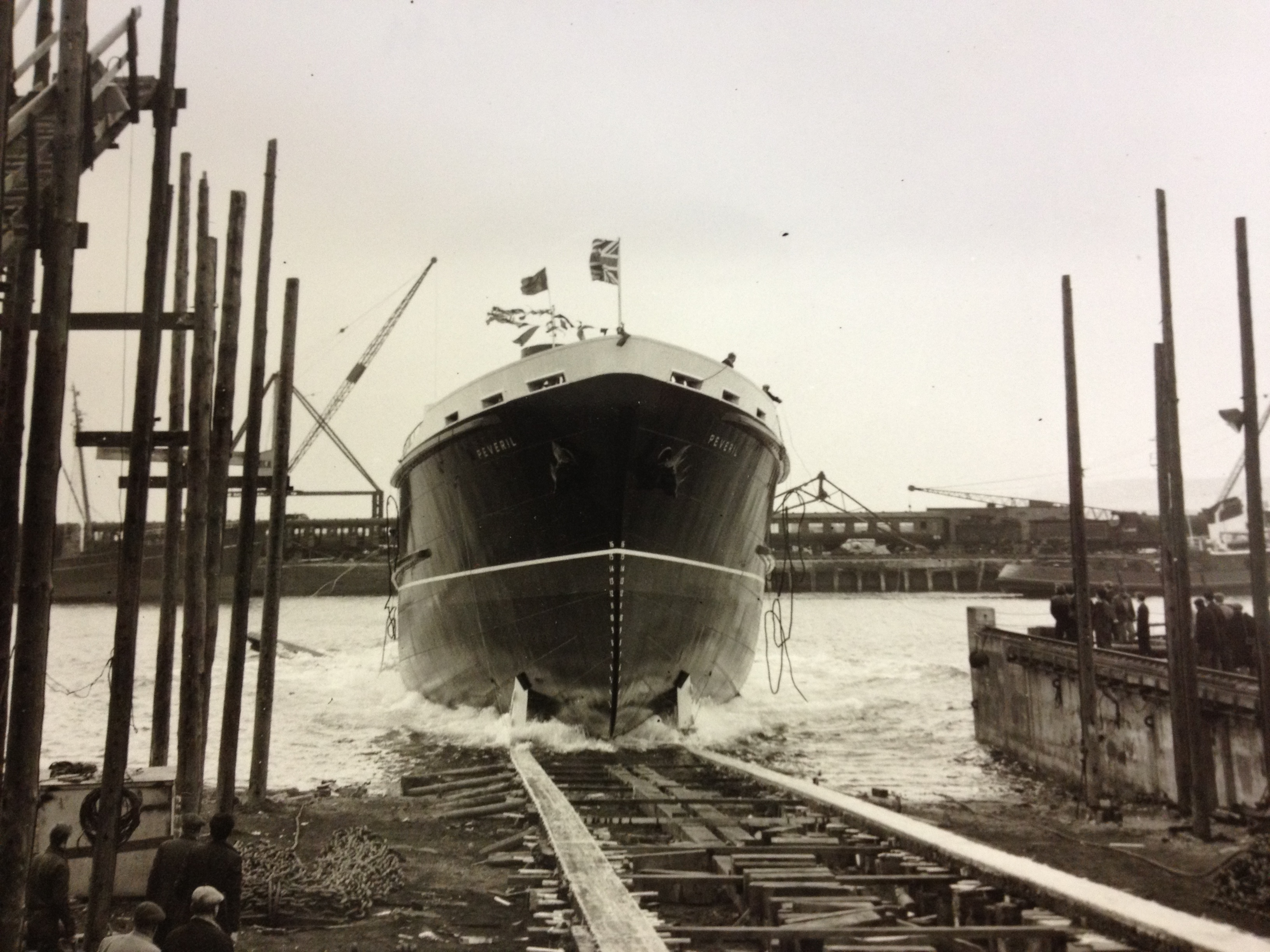
Peveril launching at Troon, Tuesday, 3 December 1963

The second of the modern cargo ships to be built for the company by the Ailsa yards, she was originally fitted with two 10-ton electric cranes - the first to be fitted to a Steam Packet ship. Peveril also had a special system for transporting livestock between her decks.

Although the company's cargo services seemed settled for a decade or so, the container revolution rapidly changed everything, and by 1972 the service was almost fully utilized.

At Douglas a 28-ton derrick crane was erected and supporting improvements were made to the adjacent warehousing.

Peveril returned to the Ailsa yards, where she was converted to a container ship. The cranes were removed and a cellular system for 56 standard units (20 ft (6.10 m) x 8 ft (2.44 m) x 8 ft (2.44 m)) was installed, together with enhanced provision for the carriage of livestock.

In September 1972, Liverpool's southern docks were closed by the Mersey Docks and Harbour Company. The Steam Packet ships accordingly had to leave the Coburg Dock from which cargo had been despatched since 1910, and moved to Hornby Dock which was closer to Douglas and was approached by a non-tidal entrance.

The obsolete Fenella was sold at the beginning of 1973, and it was expected that Peveril would be able to handle all cargo traffic under the new container system. However, the benefits of the containerized system produced startling growth, and in 1973 a 31% increase was recorded.

Consequently, the company decided that a second containerized vessel would be required, and in November they purchased the Spaniel, which was renamed and entered service as the Conister, This purchase rendered Peveril's younger sister Ramsey as obsolete, as her conversion to a container ship was not practical, and she was subsequently sold in 1974.

The combined capacity of the Peveril and Conister was considered to be approximately 125,000 tons a year, and with this faith in containerization substantial growth continued during 1974 and 1975.

== Disposal and subsequent use ==
The Peveril and Conister continued to provide a reliable operation on the Douglas - Liverpool cargo service. However, by the early 1980s the handling of containerized cargo at Douglas had undergone a revolutionary change with the arrival of Manxline and their multi-purpose vessel Manx Viking.

It was apparent to the Steam Packet that in order to compete with their then rival shipping company, the introduction of a RO-RO cargo service was necessary. Both Peveril and Conister were put up for sale, and a new cargo vessel NF Jaguar was chartered. This vessel went on to be purchased, and renamed MV Peveril (1971).

In 1981, Peveril was sold to Sea Doll Marine Co Ltd, Cyprus, and this was followed by numerous further sales, mostly within Cyprus. In 1982, she was acquired by Virginia Express Nav Co Ltd, Cyprus. This was followed by a further sale in 1983, to Akak Marine Co Ltd. Again, operating under the Cypriot flag, she was purchased by Flourishing Marine Ltd, Cyprus in 1991 until 1992, when G M Khatib R M A Kojok, Lebanon took ownership of her. They sold her in 1999 to other Lebanese interests until she was sold for breaking. She was scrapped in Aliağa, Turkey, in April 2001.
