= RMS Mona's Isle =

RMS Mona's Isle may refer to:

- SS Mona's Isle (1830) A wooden paddle steamer operated by, and the first vessel ordered for service with, the Isle of Man Steam Packet Company when it began its operation in 1830. Disposed of in 1851.
- Mona's Isle (1860) Mona's Isle was originally built as an iron paddle steamer by Tod and McGregor Ltd, Glasgow, 1860. Converted to a screw-driven vessel and renamed Ellan Vannin in 1883. Sank in a storm in Liverpool Bay, 3 December 1909.
- SS Mona's Isle (1882) A paddle steamer owned and operated by the Isle of Man Steam Packet Company, until she was sold to the Admiralty in 1915. Following service in the First World War the vessel was broken up by Thos. W. Ward at Morecambe in September 1919.
- SS Mona's Isle (1905) A packet steamer originally named Onward, initially owned and operated by the South Eastern & Chatham Railway Company, who sold her to the Isle of Man Steam Packet Company in 1920. Broken up at Milford Haven in 1948.
- SS Mona's Isle (1950) The fifth ship of the King Orry class of passenger ferries and packet ships, more commonly referred to as the six sisters. Broken up in the Netherlands, 1980.
- Mona's Isle (1966) A roll on - roll off car and passenger ferry, entered service as MV Free Enterprise with Townsend Brothers Ferries in 1966. Sold to the Isle of Man Steam Packet Company and renamed Mona's Isle in 1984. Subsequently, re-sold and eventually wrecked in the Red Sea, 2004.
