= Snaefell (ship) =

Snaefell may refer to several ships operated by the Isle of Man Steam Packet Company:

- PS Snaefell (1863) (I) 1863 to 1875
- PS Snaefell (1876) (II) 1876 to 1904
- RMS Snaefell (1910) (III) 1910 to 1914
- SS Snaefell (1906) (IV) (ex-Viper) 1920 to 1945
- TSS Snaefell (1948) (V) (IMO 1165287) 1948 to 1978
- HSC Snaefell (VI) (1991; IMO 8900012) 2007 to 2010 (earlier IOMSPCo. service as SeaCat Isle of Man)

(dates are years in service with IOMSPCo.)

== Also ==
- Snaefell (1943; IMO: 5332563) Icelandic fishing vessel
- Snaefell (1968; IMO: 6828923, MMSI: 251079000), a 21m fishing vessel registered in Iceland
- HMS Snaefell - (1907-1941) Glasgow-built paddle steamer that carried passengers in the Bristol Channel, and served in both World Wars as a minesweeper
