= MV Tynwald =

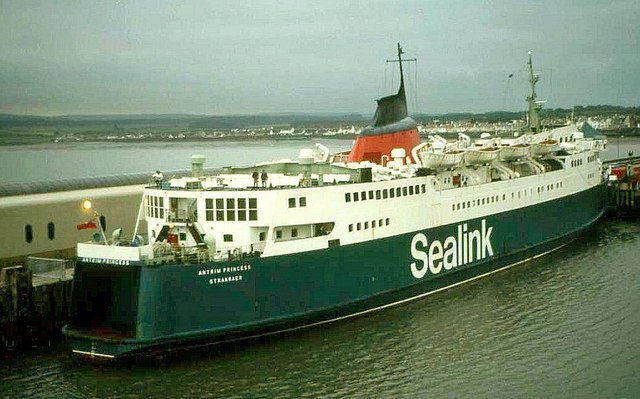
- Antrim Princess at Stranraer.

History

Isle of Man
- Name: 1967–1986: Antrim Princess; 1986–1990: Tynwald; 1990–2003: Lauro Express; 2004–2007: Giuseppe D'Abundo; 2007: Stella
- Owner: 1967–1986: Sealink Manx Line; 1986–1990: IOMSPCo
- Port of registry: 1967–1986: Stranraer; 1986–1990: Douglas, Isle of Man
- Builder: R. & W. Hawthorn Leslie and Company Limited, Hebburn-on-Tyne
- Yard number: 765
- Launched: 26 Apr 1967
- Completed: Dec 1967
- Maiden voyage: 1967
- In service: 1967
- Out of service: circa 2006
- Identification: IMO number: 6714562; Callsign: V4KW
- Fate: Sold in 2006 for breaking, scrapped in 2007.

General characteristics
- Type: Roll-on/Roll-off passenger ferry
- Propulsion: Screw-propeller
- Speed: Approximately 20 knots (23 mph)

MV Tynwald was a roll-on-roll-off car and cargo vessel operated by the Isle of Man Steam Packet Company between 1986 and 1990, the sixth ship in the history of the line to bear the name. Built as Antrim Princess for service on the Stranraer–Larne route, she was chartered under her original name until 1986.

== Construction ==
Antrim Princess was built by Hawthorn Leslie & Co. at Hebburn-on-Tyne in 1967. The ship was notable as being British Rail's first seagoing ship to be fitted with a bow door and therefore, was the very first Sealink drive-through ferry. She also broke with the Company's long tradition of using steam turbine propulsion for its channel vessels, a move that introduced the funnel design that was to become synonymous with British Rail and later Sealink ferries.

== Service life ==
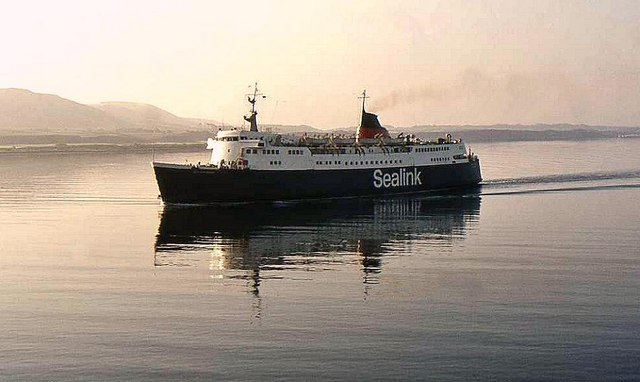
Antrim Princess in Loch Ryan on 9 June 1984.

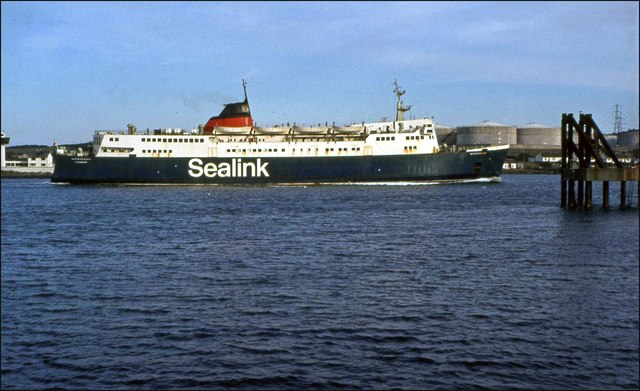
Antrim Princess in Larne.

Antrim Princess was designed for service on the Stranraer - Larne route. Apart from a serious engine room fire in December 1983 which caused all the passengers to be airlifted to safety prior to the fire being brought under control, she had a largely uneventful career on the North Channel.

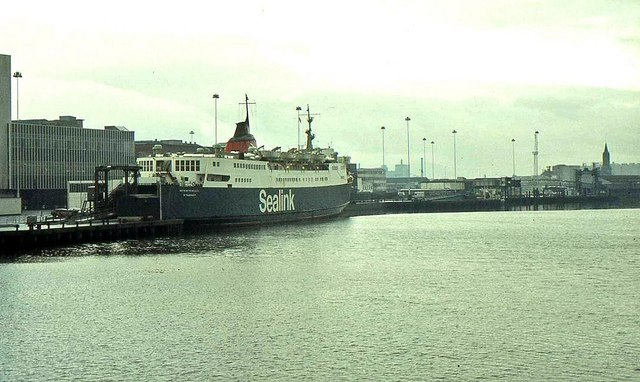
Antrim Princess in Belfast on 9 December 1983.

With the privatisation of Sealink UK in 1984 and the subsequent Sealink-Manxline/Isle of Man Steam Packet merger, a consolidation regarding the vessels operating to and from the Isle of Man, and the routes to be served was undertaken. Services would be concentrated on the Heysham–Douglas route with a strengthened two-ship service using the larger Mona's Isle (VI) and Antrim Princess.

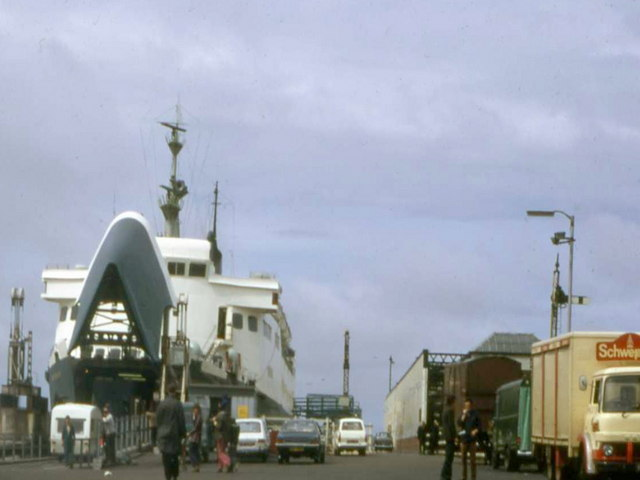
Antrim Princess in Larne.

After over 150 years of continuous service, the Steam Packet's year-round Liverpool–Douglas services were to be abandoned.

Following the collapse of the Sealink UK/Sealink RMT Dover–Ostend route partnership, the Isle of Man agreement provided for Sealink to charter Antrim Princess as their contribution to the new merged operation. However, the MV Manx Viking actually assumed the role, whilst trade union problems delayed the transfer of Antrim Princess from Stranraer. The Steam Packet's contribution to the year-round operations was the disastrous and expensive Mona's Isle (VI). Underpowered, dubiously rebuilt and unable to carry the expected loads, Mona's Isle lasted only one season - her operational Manx career actually lasted six months. However following a settlement with the seaman's union, Antrim Princess was finally released.

Renamed Tynwald in April 1986 and painted in the Steam Packet's traditional livery, she began service joined by Manx Viking, which remained for another season. Both vessels were then supplemented in the summer by the two side-loaders Mona's Queen (V) and Lady of Mann (II).

Tynwald continued operating on the Heysham–Douglas route until February 1990 when she was returned to Sealink after the Steam Packet had found a suitable replacement in the form of King Orry (V). During her service with the Steam Packet, Tynwald always sailed with a pronounced list. According to several of the deck crew there were problems with the ballast tanks which made levelling the vessel when loaded impossible.

== Subsequent life ==
Tynwald returned to Sealink in February 1990 and was laid up awaiting sale. She was sold to Linee Lauro who employed the ship on their lengthy routes between Italy, Sicily and Tunisia and renamed Lauro Express. Prior to entering service she received new cabin accommodation. For 2003, she received a black hull under the new Medmar brand, whilst in 2004 she was renamed Giuseppe D'Abundo.

Before the 2004 summer season could get into full swing however, Medmar closed their route from Sete to Palma de Mallorca, which had been operated by the Giulia d'Abundo. The displaced ship was moved round to Italy and took the place of the Giuseppe D'Abundo which was subsequently laid-up in Naples. For the 2005 summer, Medmar announced that the ship was to be re-activated for deployment on new Adriatic services based in Bari and operating to Dubrovnik and Corfu. These were however later cancelled, the ship being chartered out instead to Di Maio & Partners for their Bari–Durrës run.

== Disposal ==
In early 2006, it was reported that the ship had been sold for scrap, but she remained laid-up for a time in Naples awaiting her fate before, finally, arriving at Alang in India in February 2007 under the name Stella.
