= Manx Line =

Ferry service operating between Great Britain and the Isle of Man

- Industry: Shipping
- Founded: 1978
- Defunct: 1985
- Fate: Merged with Isle of Man Steam Packet Company
- Headquarters: Douglas, Isle of Man
- Area served: Irish Sea
- Key people: Geoff Duke CEO
- Services: Passenger transportation Freight transportation

Manx Line was a ferry operator which operated roll-on/roll-off ferry services between Great Britain and the Isle of Man between 1978 and 1985. An earlier, unrelated, company had used the "Manx Line" name in the late 19th century.

== History ==
Businessman and former motorcycle racing champion Geoff Duke was head of Manx Line, which offered a service from Douglas to Heysham. The company operated one vessel, Manx Viking, which was formerly the Spanish-owned Monte Castillo, in competition with the Isle of Man Steam Packet Company, which at the time was operating side-loading vehicle ferries and passenger-only turbine steamers. While Manx Line had successful advertising, and the roll-on/roll-off service quickly became popular with passengers, Manx Viking proved unreliable and broke down frequently in the first year of operations.

A gale in 1978 destroyed the company's linkspan in Douglas Harbour, causing £1 million of damage to the Victoria Pier. It took five years to settle the matter, by which time Manx Line had been acquired by Sealink. The new owners continued to operate the Manx Viking on the same route, offering strong competition to the Isle of Man Steam Packet Company. The rival firm purchased a linkspan in 1980, and took out a charter on the P&O Ferries vessel NF Jaguar (later Peveril).

Sealink, including Manx Line, was sold to Sea Containers in 1984. Manx Line became the vehicle for a reverse takeover of the Isle of Man Steam Packet Company by Sea Containers in 1985, consolidating the two Manx businesses, and the Manx Line branding was retired.

== Fleet ==
Manx Line operated only one vessel, the MV Manx Viking, which remained in service with the Isle of Man Steam Packet Company until 1986, before being sold. She later operated in Canada as the Nindawayma. Various other vessels were chartered to cover for the Manx Viking, including the Viking III of Townsend Thoresen in 1980.
