= MV Ramsey =

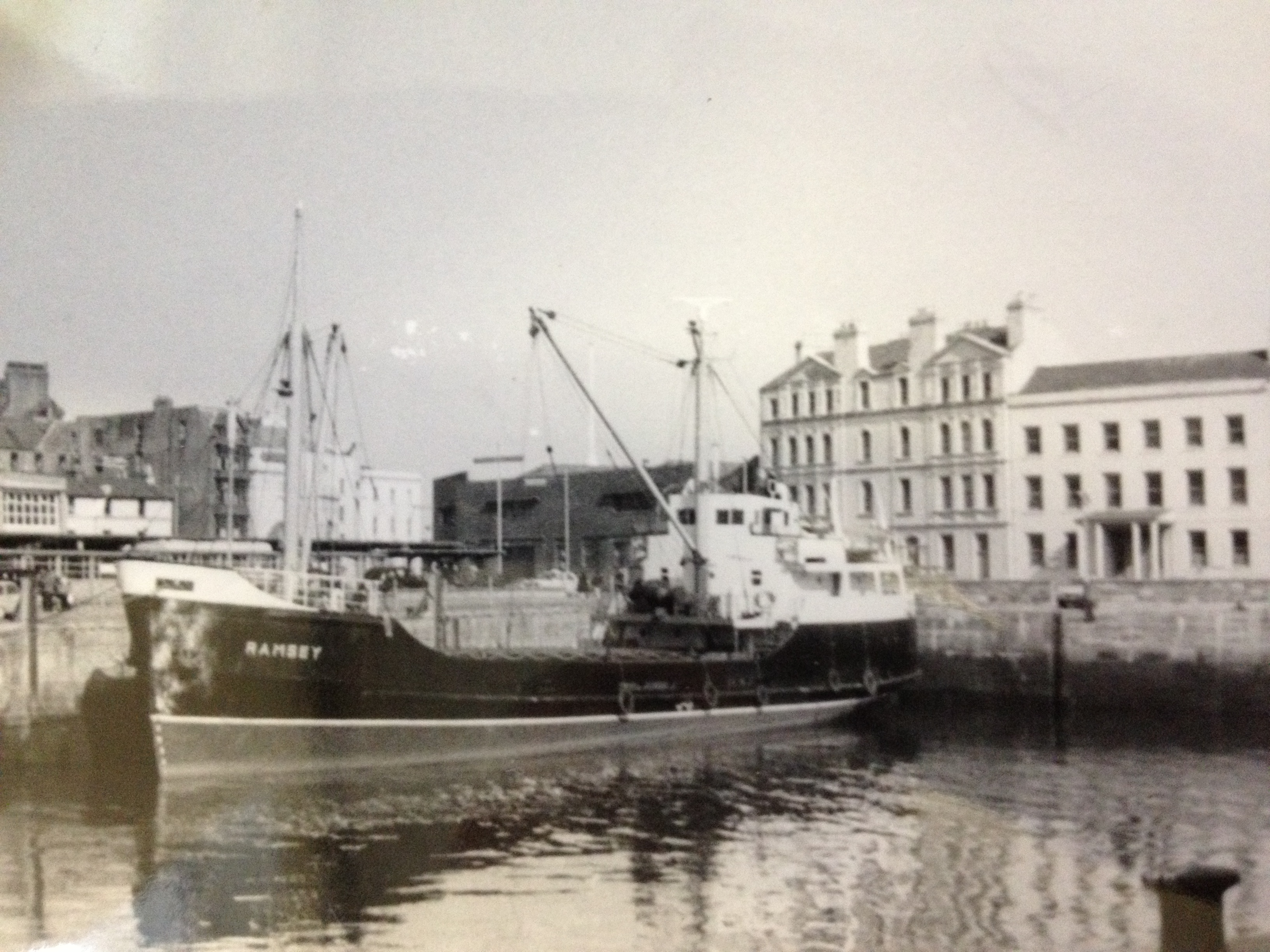
- Ramsey at the Coffee Palace berth, Douglas

History
- Name: Ramsey (1964-75); Hoofort (1974-82); Boa Entrada (1982-90); Arquipelago (1990-present)
- Owner: Isle of Man Steam Packet Company (1965-1974); R Lapthorn & Co Ltd, Rochester (1974-82); Teodore Jose Nasciamento, Cape Verde Islands (1982-90); Soc Exportes Industrie E Mar. Ltda, Cape Verde Islands (1990-present)
- Operator: Owner operated
- Port of registry: Douglas, Isle of Man
- Builder: Ailsa Shipbuilding Company, Troon, Scotland
- Cost: £158,647 (equivalent to £2,809,500 in 2025).
- Yard number: 519
- Launched: Thursday, 5 November 1964
- Maiden voyage: 1965
- In service: 1965
- Out of service: Sold 1974
- Identification: IMO number: 6500325; Official Number 186354
- Status: Active

General characteristics
- Type: Cargo Vessel.
- Tonnage: 446 gross register tons (GRT)
- Length: 155 ft 8 in (47.45 m)
- Beam: 29 ft 3 in (8.92 m)
- Draught: 11 ft 7 in (3.53 m)
- Installed power: 490 shp (370 kW)
- Propulsion: Six cylinder British Polar engine
- Speed: 10 knots (19 km/h)
- Crew: 18

MV Ramsey was a coastal cargo vessel built for the Isle of Man Steam Packet Company in 1964. She was the last vessel specially built to serve the smaller ports of the Island.

== Construction & Dimensions ==
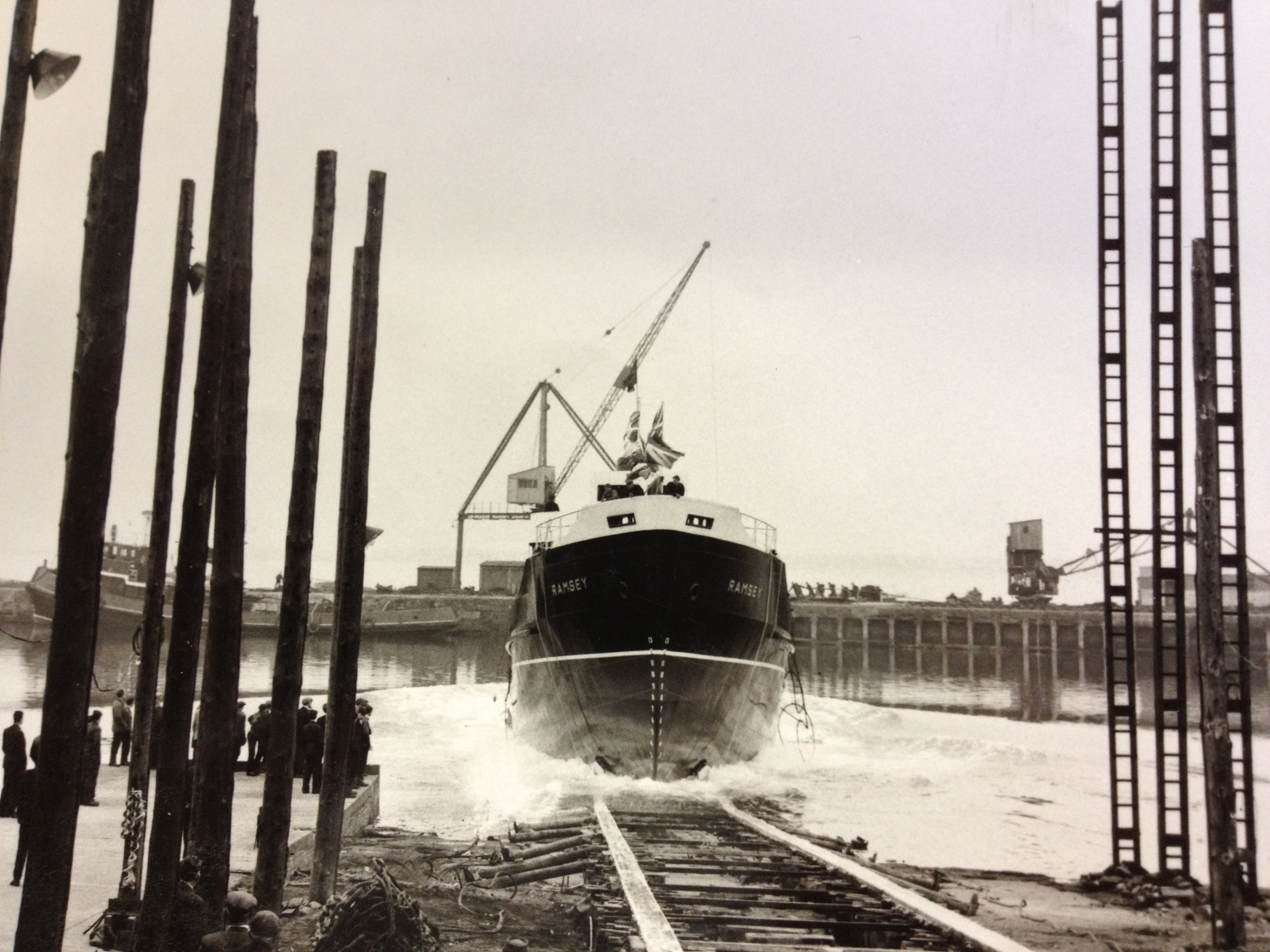
Ramsey is launched at Troon, 5 November 1964.

Ramsey was built by Ailsa Shipbuilding Company at Troon, Scotland, at a cost of £158,647 (equivalent to £2,809,500 in 2025).

Work commenced in 1964, and was completed by spring 1965. Ramsey had a length of 149'; beam 28'; depth 12'1" and a speed of 10 knots. The vessel's tonnage was 446 gross register tons, and she was fitted with a six-cylinder British Polar engine developing 490 brake horsepower, with crew accommodation for 18.

== Service life ==
Ramsey was built to replace the Conister, and was based at Ramsey. In the early 1970s containerization resulted in a marked upsurge in freight business. In 1973 alone, there was a 31 per cent rise in cargo.

It was first expected that the Peveril, operating alongside Ramsey, would be able to meet this demand and the company sold their other general cargo vessel, the Fenella at the beginning of 1973. However, the majority of cargo shipping soon switched to containers, and given Ramsey's deficiencies in handling containerized cargoes, it became apparent that a second container vessel would be needed to expedite matters. One was chartered and later bought, Conister.

== Gallery ==
MV Ramsey
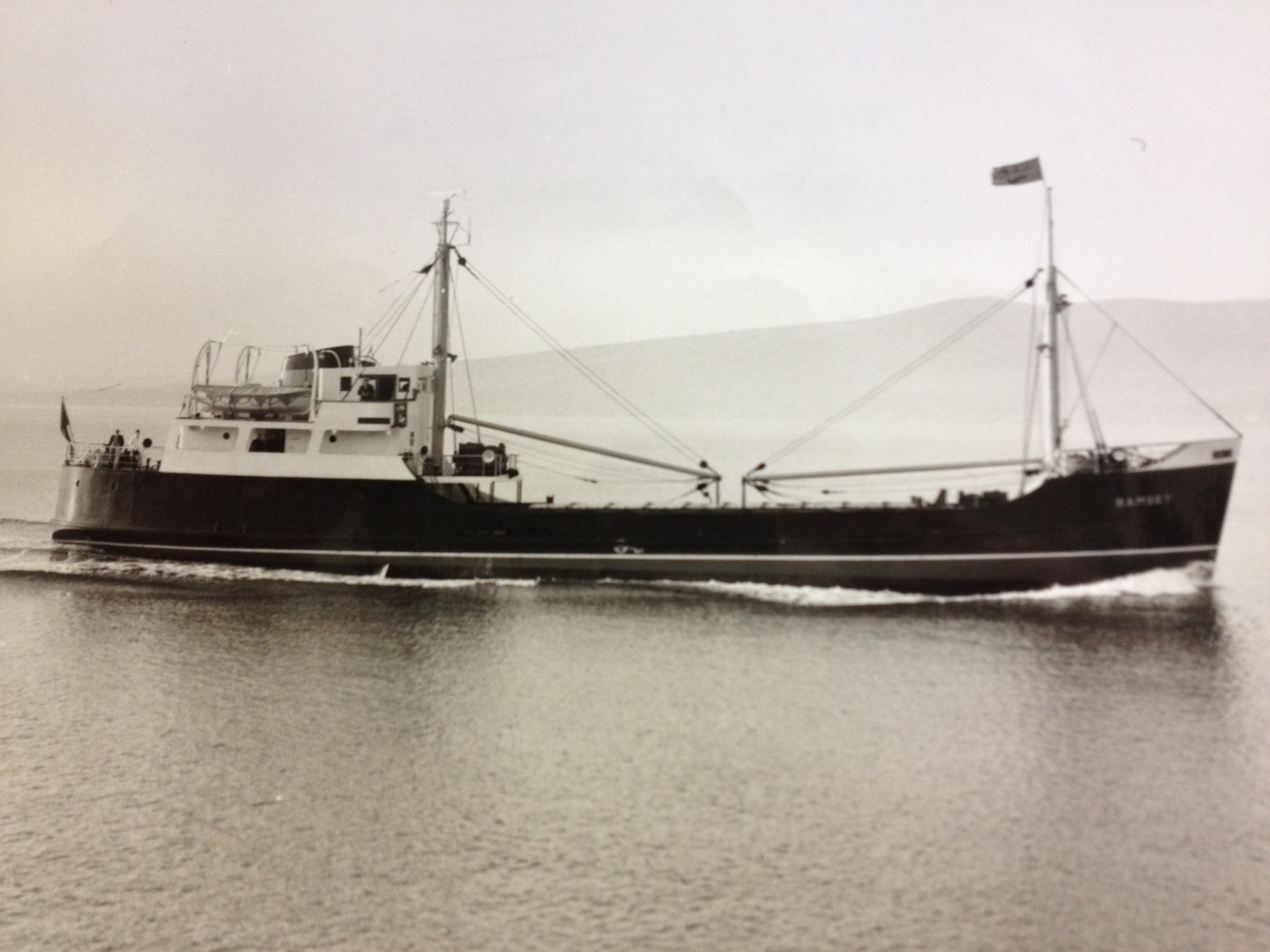
Ramsey at sea

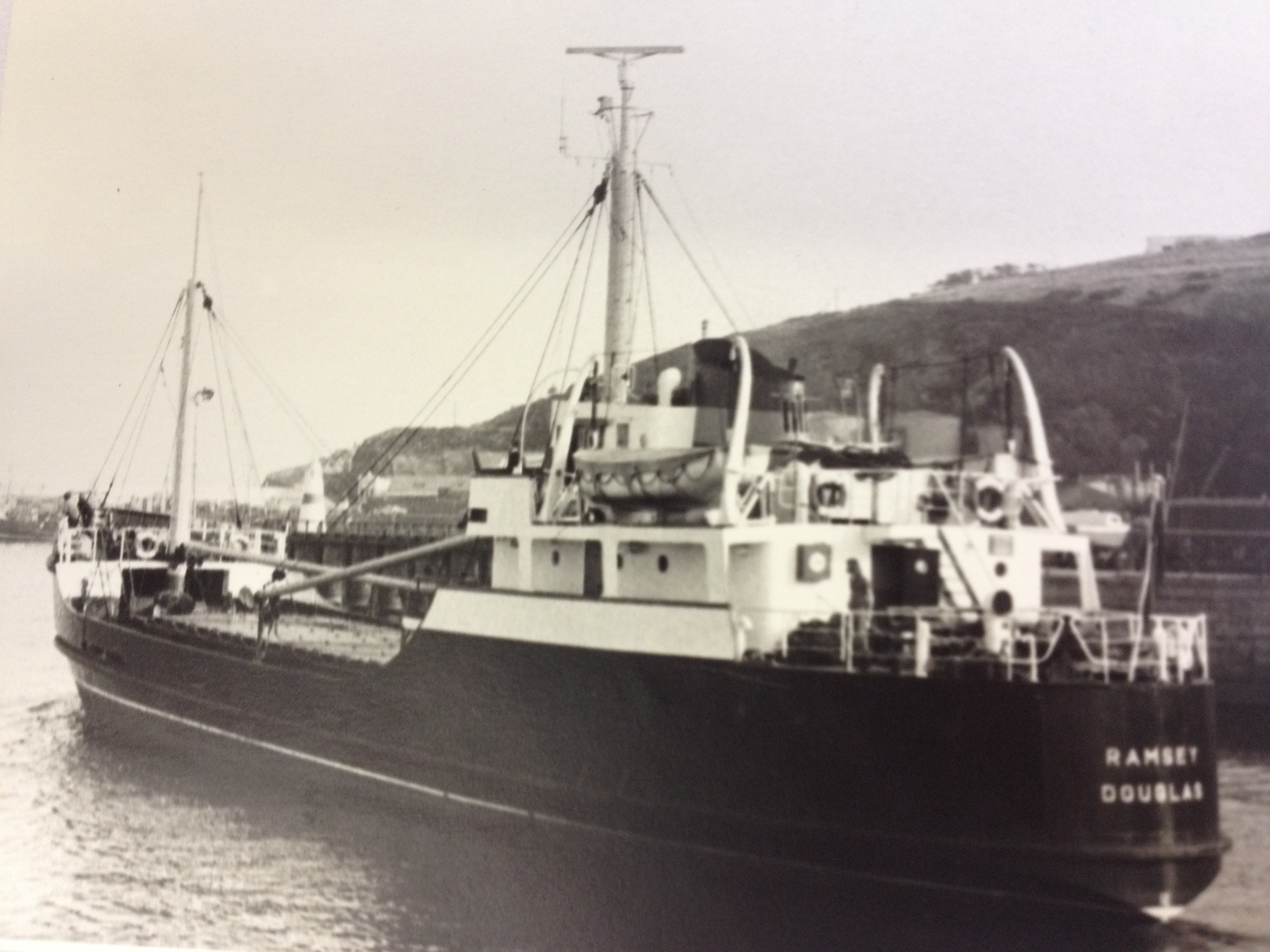
Ramsey leaving Douglas, Isle of Man

== Disposal and subsequent use ==
Though able to carry the old wooden containers, Ramsey's hold design made it difficult to load and unload her efficiently. In early 1973, the Isle of Man Steam Packet Company decided that the Ramsey would not be suitable for conversion to take modern containers, and at the end of that year she was put up for sale. Ramsey was sold to R. Lapthorn and Co. of Hoo, Rochester, Kent. There was some controversy surrounding the withdrawal of the weekly freight service to the Isle of Man, and that Ramsey was sold for less than her valuation.

Renamed the Hoofort, she began trading around the south coast of England until acquired by Teodore Jose Nasciamento, Cape Verde Islands in 1982.

This company then operated her under the name Boa Entrada until 1990, converting her to an oil tanker and using her to supply liquid fuel and bottled gas on behalf of ENACOL, the state fuel company. She was again sold in 1990, this time to Soc Exportes Industrie E Mar. Ltd, Cape Verde Islands, and renamed Arquipelago.
