= HMS Wellington (U65) =

1934 Grimsby-class sloop

Coordinates: 51°30′38″N 0°6′45″W

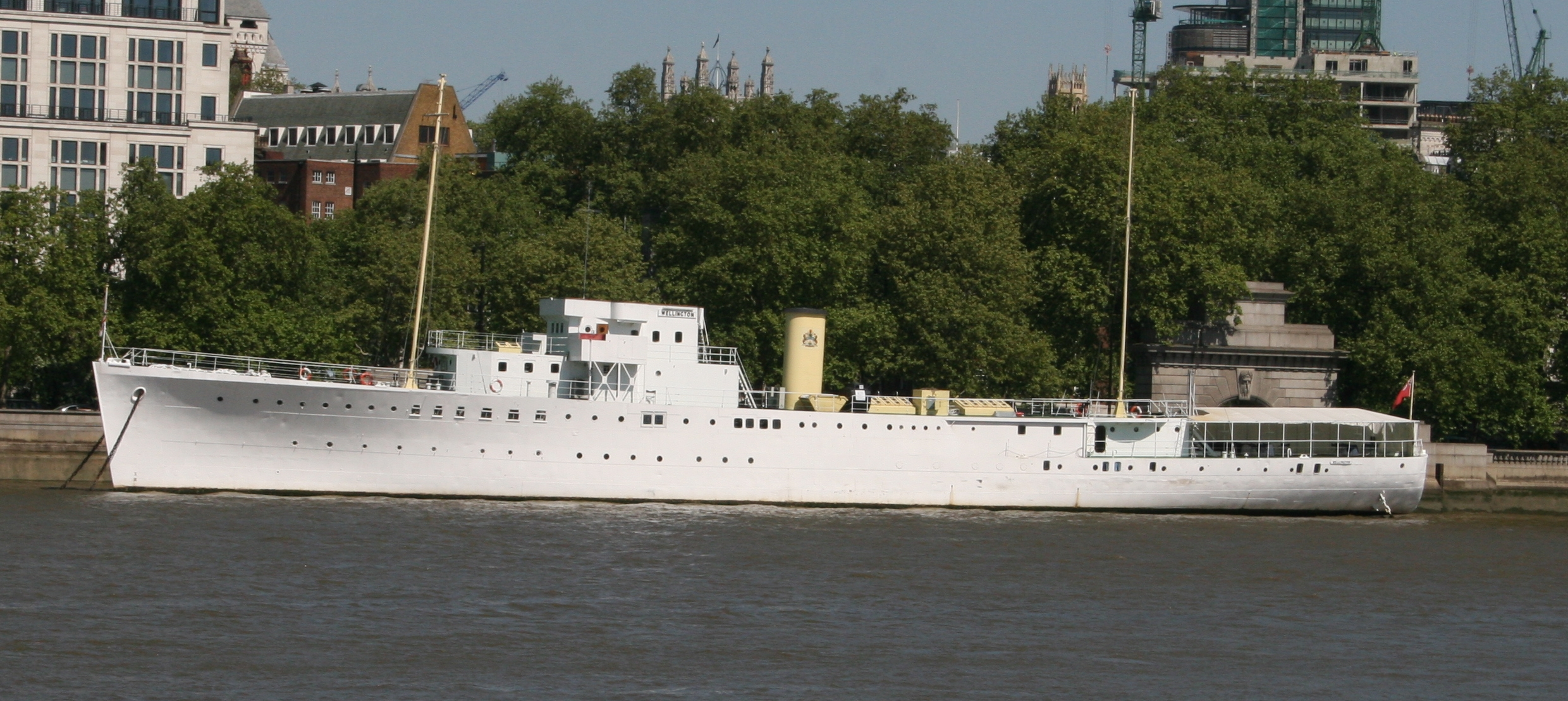
- Wellington moored in London on the Thames

History

United Kingdom
- Name: HMS Wellington
- Builder: Devonport Dockyard
- Launched: 29 May 1934
- Out of service: 1947
- Identification: Pennant number: U65
- Fate: Sold as headquarters ship

United Kingdom
- Owner: 1947-2005 Honourable Company of Master Mariners; from 2005 The Wellington Trust
- Status: Headquarters ship on River Thames

General characteristics (World War II)
- Displacement: 990 long tons (1,006 t) standard; 1,480–1,510 long tons (1,504–1,534 t)
- Length: 266 ft 3 in (81.15 m) o/a
- Beam: 36 ft (11.0 m)
- Draught: RN ships : 9 ft 11 in (3.02 m) – 10 ft 1 in (3.07 m)
- Propulsion: Parsons geared steam turbines; 2 Admiralty 3-drum water-tube boilers; 2 shafts; 2,000 shp (1,500 kW)
- Speed: 16.5 knots (19.0 mph; 30.6 km/h)
- Complement: 100
- Armament: 2 × 4.7 in (120 mm) Mark IX guns; 1 × QF 3 inch 20 cwt anti-aircraft gun; 4 × 3-pounder guns; 15-90 Depth charges

HMS Wellington (launched Devonport, 1934) is a Grimsby-class sloop, formerly of the Royal Navy. During the Second World War, she served as a convoy escort ship in the North Atlantic. She is now moored alongside the Victoria Embankment, at Temple Pier, on the River Thames in London, England. From 1948 to 2023 she was the headquarters ship of the Honourable Company of Master Mariners, known as HQS Wellington. In 2024, she returned to her prefix of HMS Wellington.

== Royal Navy service ==
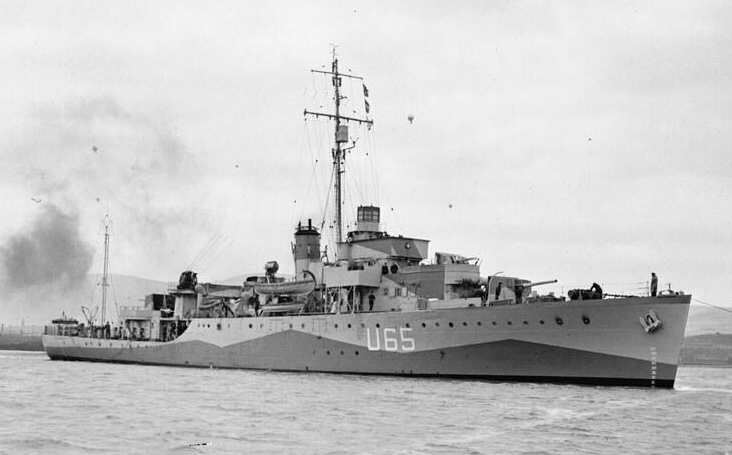
Wellington in April 1942.

Built at Devonport in 1934, HMS Wellington served in the Pacific mainly on station in New Zealand and China before the Second World War. As built, Wellington mounted two 4.7-inch guns and one 3-inch gun. Additionally, anti-aircraft guns were fitted for self-defence. Depth charges for use against submarines were carried. Wellington served primarily in the North Atlantic on convoy escort duties. She shared in the destruction of one enemy U-boat and was involved in Operation Cycle, the evacuation of Allied troops from Le Havre. During 1943 she was briefly commanded by Captain John Treasure Jones, at that time a lieutenant commander in the Royal Navy Reserve, who would later be the last captain of RMS Queen Mary.

The Grimsby-class anti-submarine sloops of 1933-36, which included HMS Wellington, were the predecessors of the Black Swan class of 1939.

== Honourable Company of Master Mariners ==
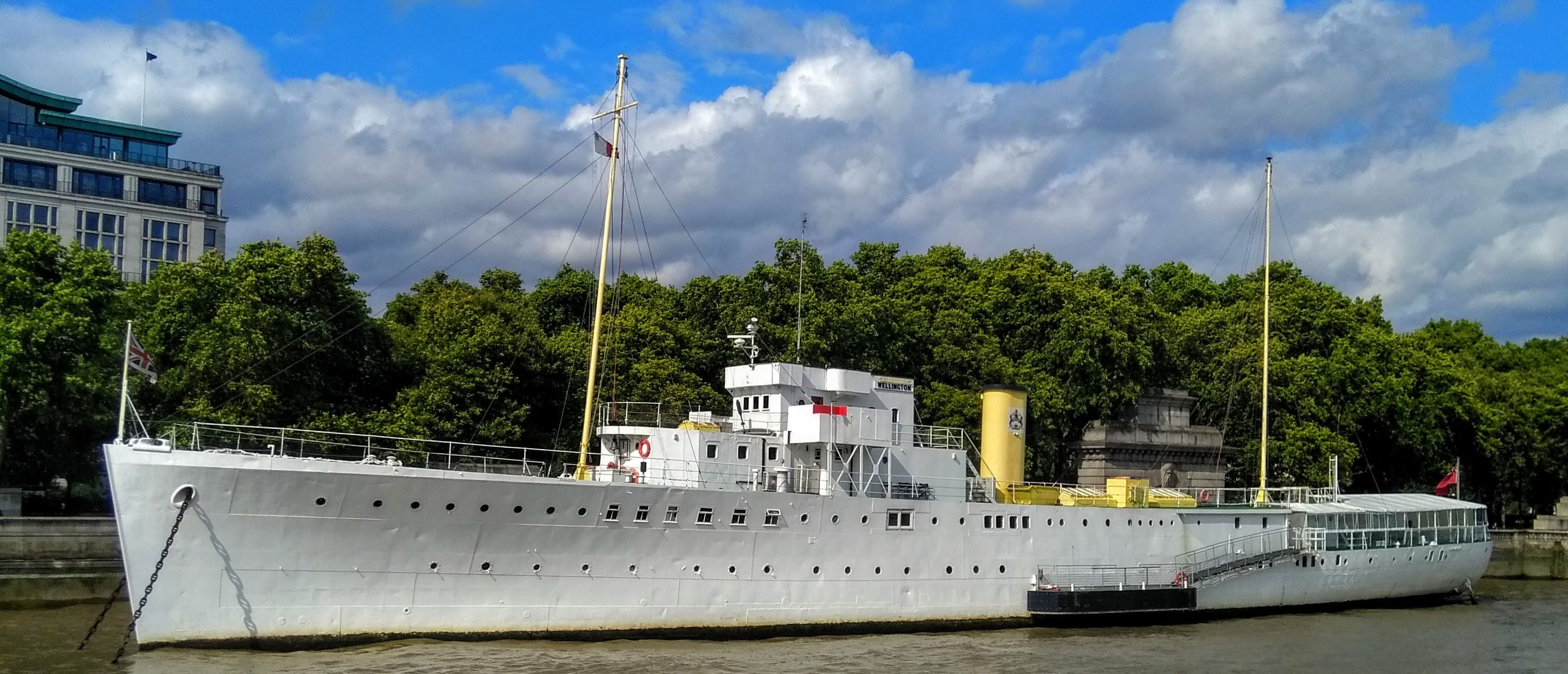
Port quarter view of HMS Wellington

It was always the ambition of the founding members of the Honourable Company of Master Mariners to have a livery hall. Up to the outbreak of war in 1939, various proposals were examined, including the purchase of a sailing ship, Archibald Russell. However, after the Second World War, it became apparent that building a hall in the City of London would be costly and it was realised that the large number of ships available following the end of the war could provide a better way of housing the company. In 1947, the Grimsby-class sloop Wellington was made available by the Admiralty. She was then converted to a floating livery hall, an appropriate home for a company of seafarers. She was converted to Headquarters Ship (HQS) Wellington at Chatham Dockyard.

The cost of this purchase and conversion was met by an appeal to which Masters, members, Lloyd's, shipping companies, livery companies and other benefactors contributed. It included the installation of a grand wooden staircase taken from the 1906 Isle of Man ferry SS Viper, which was being broken up at the same time. The engine room was removed to provide a grand hall for dinners and ceremonies. Wellington arrived at her Victoria Embankment berth in December 1948 to continue service as the floating livery hall of the Honourable Company of Master Mariners.

In 1991, HQS Wellington was dry-docked at Sheerness Dockyard for three months during which, apart from extensive steelwork repairs and complete external painting, she received a major refurbishment which included the refitting of all toilet facilities, offices and accommodation areas. Wellington was fitted with carpet, and displays were installed of the company's marine paintings and artefacts, gold and silver plate, ship models and newly discovered early 18th-century charts.

From 2014, Wellington also served as the London postal address of the Flag Institute.

== The Wellington Trust ==
In 2005, The Wellington Trust was set up as a registered charity to assist with the long-term preservation of the ship. Ownership of the Wellington was then transferred to the Wellington Trust, while it remained the headquarters of the HCMM.

In April 2023, safety concerns forced the Honourable Company to leave the ship, though they were developing plans for a new floating livery hall. After a period of maintenance and compliance work, the Wellington Trust announced the ship was safe for public use and met all statutory legal requirements and licences to operate. The first phase of reopening the ship to the public began in October 2023. Wellington will continue to be a floating classroom and venue for events. In June 2024, it was reported that the ship was seeking £150,000 for repairs to the ship to continue her preservation. In September 2024, King Charles III approved the name change from HQS Wellington back to HMS Wellington.

In February 2025, the Trust received a National Lottery Heritage grant of £220,000 to maintain and preserve the ship.

== See also ==
- HMS Duke of Wellington
