= Nindawayma =

Ship built in 1974

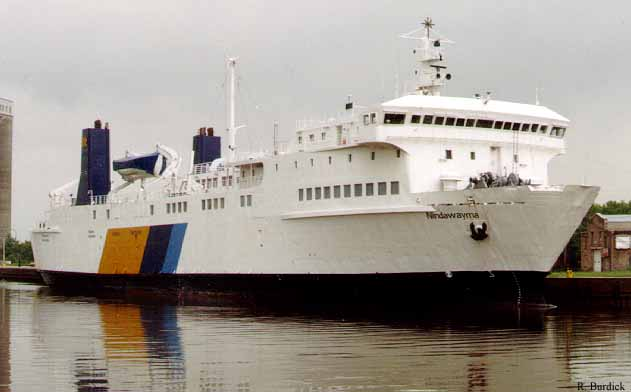
- Nindawayma

History
- Name: 1974–1976: Monte Cruceta; 1976–1978: Monte Castillo; 1978–1987: Manx Viking; 1987: Manx; 1987–1989: Skudenes; 1989: Ontario No.1; 1989–2012: Nindawayma
- Operator: 1974–1978: Aznar Line; 1978–1979: Manx Line; 1979–1986: Sealink Manx Line; 1986–1987: IOMSPCo.; 1987–1989: DSD; 1989–1992: Owen Sound Transport Company; 1992–2007: Laid up; 2007-2012: Purvis Marine
- Port of registry: 1974–1978: Bilbao Spain; 1978–1987: Douglas Isle of Man; 1987–1989: Stavanger Norway; 1989–1992: Owen Sound Canada
- Builder: S.A. Juliana Gijonesa
- Launched: 19 August 1974
- In service: 1974
- Out of service: 1992
- Identification: IMO number: 7387251
- Fate: Scrapped 2007–2012

General characteristics
- Tonnage: 3,594 GRT
- Length: 101.66 m (333 ft 6 in)
- Beam: 17.10 m (56 ft 1 in)
- Draught: 4.80 m (15 ft 9 in)
- Installed power: 2 x Pielstick diesel engines
- Propulsion: 2 × controllable pitch propellers; bow thrusters
- Speed: 17 knots
- Capacity: 800 passengers

The Nindawayma was a passenger, truck and car ferry. Built as long-distance multi-purpose roll-on/roll-off ferry, that handled both cargo and passengers with fully refrigerated vehicle decks. Built by S.A. Juliana Gijonesa in Gijón, Spain, she was one of three sister ships and launched on 19 August 1974. She remained in service until 1992, and was scrapped in 2012.

She entered service as Monte Castillo with Naviera Aznar, Spain in 1976, two years postponed due to outfitting delays. She was sold to Manx Line in 1977 (later Sealink-Manx Line) and renamed Manx Viking for service between Heysham, England, and Douglas, Isle of Man. She was bought by Det Stavangerske Dampskibsselskab in 1987, named Skudenes and for a brief year put into the Mekjarvik–Skudeneshavn service across Boknafjorden. Her last service was with the Owen Sound Transportation Company on Lake Huron between Tobermory and South Baymouth, Manitoulin Island from 1989 to 1992.

== Specifications ==
Her maximum speed was 18 knots (33 km/h), with a draught of 5 metres (16 ft), and a metacentric height of around 2 metres (6.6 ft), giving excellent stability and seakeeping qualities. She was licensed for 777 passengers and at this stage of her life was quoted as 2,853 GRT. During Canadian service this figure was stated as 6,197 GRT, while a 1984 Sealink press release quotes " a weight of 3,589.43 tonnes". The ship was the first RORO ferry on Manx routes, and the first there to carry both freight and passenger traffic being suitable for cars, commercial trucks and trailers. She was fitted with numerous motorcycle stands to allow for Isle of Man TT and Manx Grand Prix traffic. As built, the ship had cranes for self-loading of containers onto the afterdeck; these were unused by Manx Line. Manx Line added a bow door and visor, along with extra lifeboats; becoming the only passenger ship in Manx waters with lifeboat accommodation for all aboard. She was also the first ferry in Manx waters to have inside accommodation for all passengers. At the time her 450 tonne fuel capacity gave her the longest range of any ferry in British waters: she was theoretically capable of travelling from Heysham to Port Stanley in the Falkland Islands without refuelling. She was considered for Falklands duty, but not used.

== Service history ==
=== Spanish service ===
One of three sister ships, she was launched on 19 August 1974 as the Monte Cruceta at the S. A. Juliana Gijonesa shipyard in Gijón, for the Spanish shipping line Naviera Aznar. Outfitting delays postponed her maiden voyage until 1976, by which time she had been renamed as Monte Castillo. The ships ran a summer service in the Mediterranean, and in the winter carried fruit and vegetables across the Bay of Biscay to Liverpool and Newhaven, England, from Spain and the Balearic Islands. By 1977, the service across the Bay of Biscay for which they were built had ceased, the ships were sold. Her sisters were sold to Trasmediterranea for Mediterranean Sea service.

=== Manx service ===
During her days as the Manx Viking, she served on the Heysham to Douglas service of Sealink-Manx Line.

During Manx service she enjoyed an unrivalled reputation for reliability with passengers and was able to put to sea in weather conditions which forced her competitors to remain in port. Her arrival created a marked change in Manx traffic flows eventually resulting in the financial collapse of the rival Isle of Man Steam Packet Company, and the Steam Packet's subsequent amalgamation with Sealink-Manx Line.

She initially carried the white and blue livery of Manx Line, but after this company ran into financial difficulties and was taken over by British Rail-Sealink, she received the BR corporate monastral blue hull, white upperworks and red funnel.

She differed from other Sealink ships in carrying a gold-coloured sculpted "three legs of man" on her funnels rather than the standard BR double chevron. Later, publicity images were released of her painted in the Sea Containers era Sealink livery of white hull with blue trim, but these were mockups and the colours never applied. Due to problems with ship availability she was recalled hurriedly from dry dock before the paint job was completed, with just the new blue boot-topping applied. After the Steam Packet takeover her unwashed blue hull was given a rough overpaint of black, retaining the BR red funnels (rather than the differently-hued Steam Packet red). Following the takeover, the crew persisted in flying the Manx Line house pennant, rather than the management-mandated Steam Packet one. Later as a continued sign of protest against the takeover the crew changed this to half of a Manx Line pennant.

Following a controversial reverse takeover in 1986 by the Isle of Man Steam Packet company, she worked a season painted in Steam Packet livery, initially alongside the Mona's Isle (ex-Free Enterprise III) followed by Antrim Princess (subsequently renamed Tynwald) before Manx Viking's lease was terminated and she was returned to her owners (the parent Sealink company, by now part of Sea Containers, who had actually funded the takeover).

It was initially intended that she would be retired from Manx service following the amalgamation of Sealink-Manx Line and The Steam Packet. Services would be concentrated on the Heysham–Douglas route with a strengthened two-ship service using the larger Mona's Isle (VI) and Antrim Princess. After over 150 years of uninterrupted service, the Steam Packet's year-round Liverpool–Douglas services were to be abandoned. In the event, trade union problems delayed the transfer of Antrim Princess from Stranraer, while Mona's Isle proved unserviceable. Instead Mona's Isle was withdrawn after six months and Manx Viking remained for another season. Manx Viking was eventually replaced by the cargo-only roll-on/roll-off vessel Peveril leaving - the by now renamed - Tynwald as the only passenger vessel on the route. In so doing the combined company avoided an expensive charter as the otherwise surplus Peveril was owned by the Steam Packet, not leased and had just been released from charter on the Heysham-Belfast route. The changes in manning brought about by the Manx Viking withdrawal, and Peveril's route transfer were some of the centres of dispute of the 1980s British national seamen's strikes.

If Manx Viking had been withdrawn as originally intended, she would have been transferred to Weymouth, Dorset and renamed Earl Henry for service on the route to Cherbourg. This never took place due to the delayed availability of the Antrim Princess.

=== Norwegian service ===
Det Stavangerske Dampskibsselskab (DSD) was in 1987 in need of a larger ferry to operate on the Mekjarvik–Skudeneshavn route crossing Boknafjorden. After nearly buying the smaller Bohus, DSD was offered to buy Manx Viking, but with a very short bid window, for 20 million kroner. Two engineers were dispatched to investigate the vessel, and concluded that it was in sufficiently good shape, although it would need modifications estimated to cost 10 million kroner. By putting Skudenes into the Skudeneshavn route, DSD could carry out a fleet rotation cascade and avoid enlargement of three ferries. The Norwegian Public Roads Administration, who covered DSD's operating deficit, quickly approved the purchase.

The vessel was sailed to its new home port of Stavanger in February 1987. For the crossing she was briefly named Manx and then renamed Skudenes after arriving in Norway. Rosenberg Verft was given the task to rebuild her. It quickly became clear that she needed much more upgrades than originally foreseen, with the bill ending at 35 million kroner. The Public Roads Administration refused to cover the full cost of the ship, in the end only paying 35 of the 57 million kroner it had cost DSD. The ramps were modified, and all electrical installations were replaced.

Equally frustrating was that the extensive works meant that Skudenes had not been completed in time for the summer traffic peak, not entering service before 12 July. In the mean time, the quays at Mekjarvik and Skudeneshavn were plagues with queues. Even after entering service, the ferry had repeated engine issues, resulting in cancelled operations. This may have been a recurrence of the crankshaft problems she has been reported to have suffered while in Sealink-Manx Line service. The issue became a both a financial and public relations nightmare for the shipping company. CEO Finn Baumann, who had initiated and approved the purchase, resigned on 12 August. After a while the engine problems seemed to be resolved, and the ship actually became quite popular with the traveling public due to her large capacity, amenities and smooth ride. During late 1987 the concession for the Mekjarvik–Skudeneshavn route was put out on tender, and on 24 May 1988 it was awarded to Rutelaget Askøy–Bergen. DSD and Skudenes ran on the route for the last time on 30 June. With no other services with a similar traffic, Skudenes was put up for sale and sold in March 1989. DSD lost 8 million kroner on the sale.

=== Canadian service ===
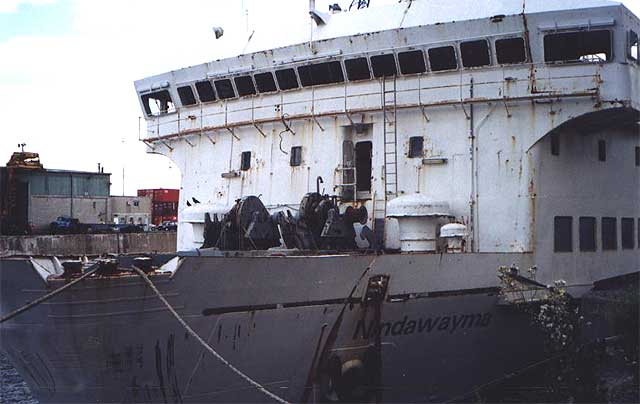
Rusting exterior

The vessel was bought by the Owen Sound Transportation Company, under contract to the Ontario Ministry of Transportation. She was renamed Ontario No.1 for the Atlantic crossing before her final renaming as Nindawayma. Her last active service was on Lake Huron, on the Highway 6 route between Tobermory and South Baymouth, Manitoulin Island from 1989 to 1992 alongside the Chi-Cheemaun.

Nindawayma’s decommissioning from Canadian service after four years of use is said to have been due to "unsatisfactory performance". There was a distinct smell of diesel fuel at deck level, possibly due to her low-set twin funnels. (Photos of her in Canadian service show that the funnel-top smoke deflectors had been removed.) Her French Pielstick diesel engines were apparently troublesome, and sailings were canceled due to mechanical problems. Her bow and stern doors were claimed to not be high enough to accommodate semi-trailer trucks despite this not being a problem in Manx or Spanish service. These factors caused significant numbers of ferry passengers to avoid the Nindawayma in favour of the Chi-Cheemaun, even if waiting involved very long delays at the ferry terminals in Tobermory and South Baymouth.

=== Final use ===
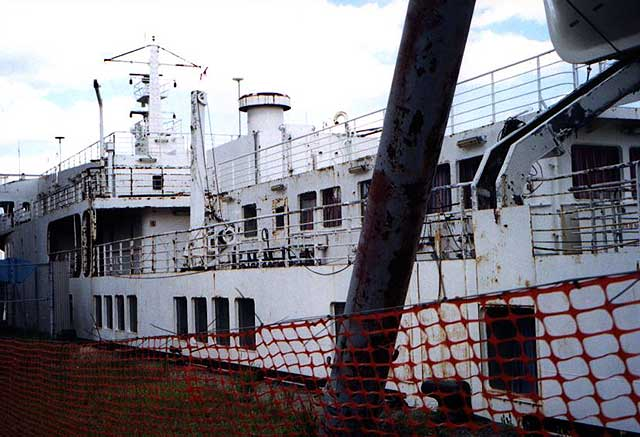
Rusting exterior

The Nindawayma was used as two movie sets; featured in 2003 as the Belles' loft on water in the film Saved by the Belles, and in 2006 as the killer's lair in the film Bon Cop, Bad Cop. As of April 2007, Nindawayma was docked in a port in Montreal, rusting and being used for parts.

== Fate ==
As of 17 August 2007, the ship was owned by Purvis Marine, a marine salvage company, and docked at a government wharf in Sault Ste. Marie, Ontario, Canada. The ship was broken up for scrap at Sault Ste Marie by Purvis Marine between 2007 and 2012, with the scrap metal being sold to the local Essar Steel Algoma steelworks.

== Bibliography ==
- Bakka, Dag (2005). Selskabe: Det Stavangerske Dampskibselskab 150 år: 1855–2005 (in Norwegian). Stavanger: Det Stavangerske Dampskibsselskab. ISBN 82-303-0571-4.
- Goodwyn, A. M. (1986). Is this any way to run a shipping line?. Manx Electric Railway Society. (A detailed history of the ship's service with Manx Line and Sealink.)
