= SS Cushag =

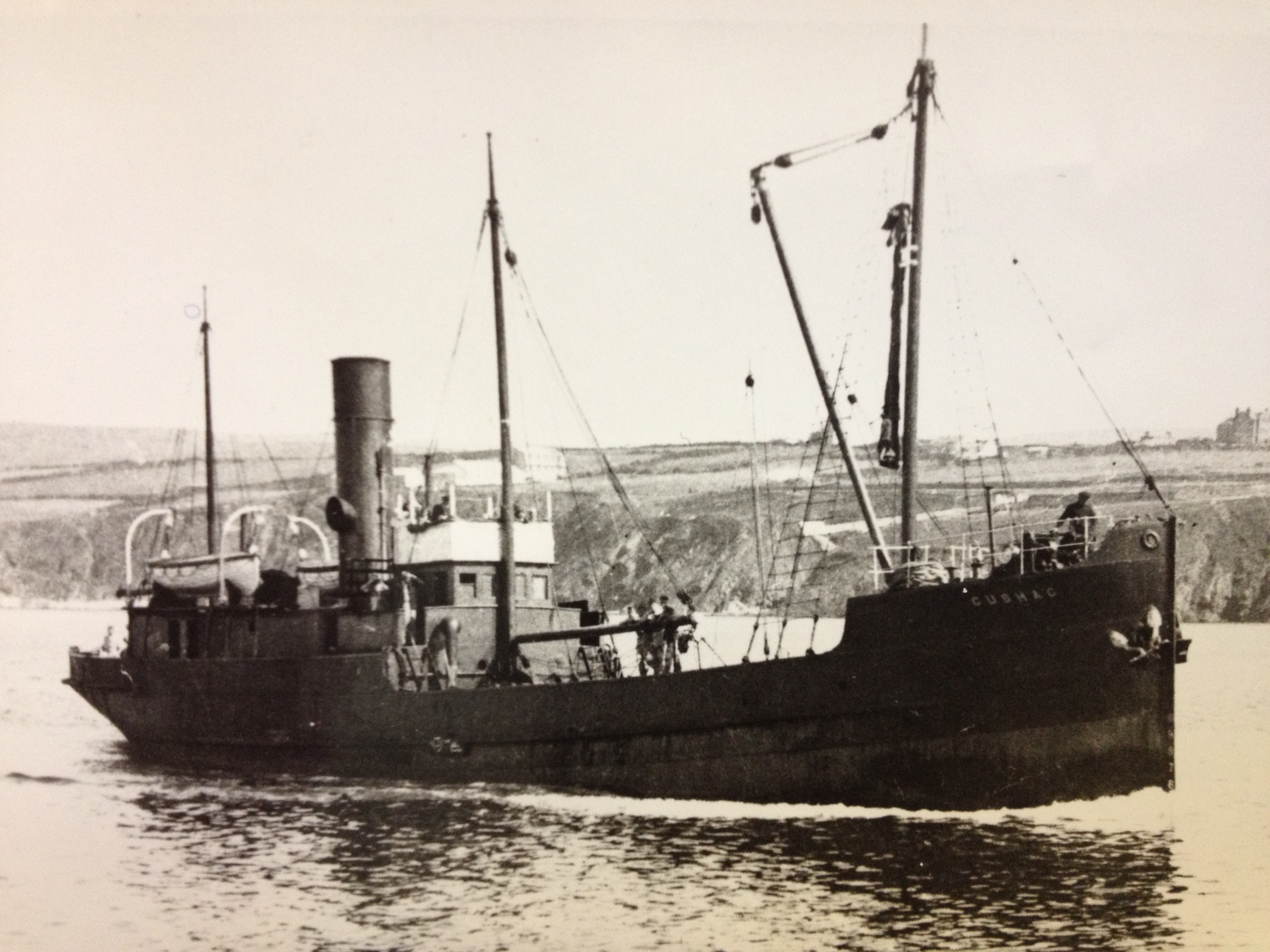
- SS Cushag approaching Peel.

History

- Name: 1908: Ardnagrena; Cushag
- Owner: 1908-1914: James Waterson & Co., Antrim; 1914-1919: Humber Steam Containers Ltd.; 1919-1920: Owned by a London Broker; 1920-1943: Isle of Man Steam Packet Company; 1943-1957: London Shipping Agents
- Operator: 1908–1914: James Waterson & Co.; 1914-1919: Humber Steam Containers Ltd.; 1919-1920: Unrecorded London Ship Broker; 1920-1943: Isle of Man Steam Packet Co.; 1943-1957: London Shipping Agents
- Port of registry: 1920-1943: Douglas, Isle of Man
- Route: Various.
- Builder: G. Brown & Company Greenock
- Launched: 12 August 1908
- Completed: 1908
- Acquired: 1920: Purchased by IoMSPCo. for £22,000
- In service: 1908
- Out of service: 1957
- Identification: Official Number 124673
- Fate: 1957: Scrapped at Grangemouth

General characteristics
- Type: Coastal Cargo Vessel
- Tonnage: 223 gross register tons (GRT)
- Length: 125 ft 0 in (38.1 m)
- Beam: 22 ft 1 in (6.7 m)
- Depth: 9 ft 2 in (2.8 m)
- Installed power: 350 ihp (260 kW)
- Speed: 10 knots (19 km/h)
- Crew: Not Recorded.

SS Cushag was a coastal cargo vessel owned and operated by the Isle of Man Steam Packet Company between 1920 and 1943.

== Dimensions ==
Cushag was a steel; single-screw vessel which had a registered tonnage of 223 GRT. Length 125'; beam 22'1"; depth 9'2". Cushag had a single steam reciprocating engine which developed 350 i.h.p.; and a design speed of 10 knots.

== Service life ==
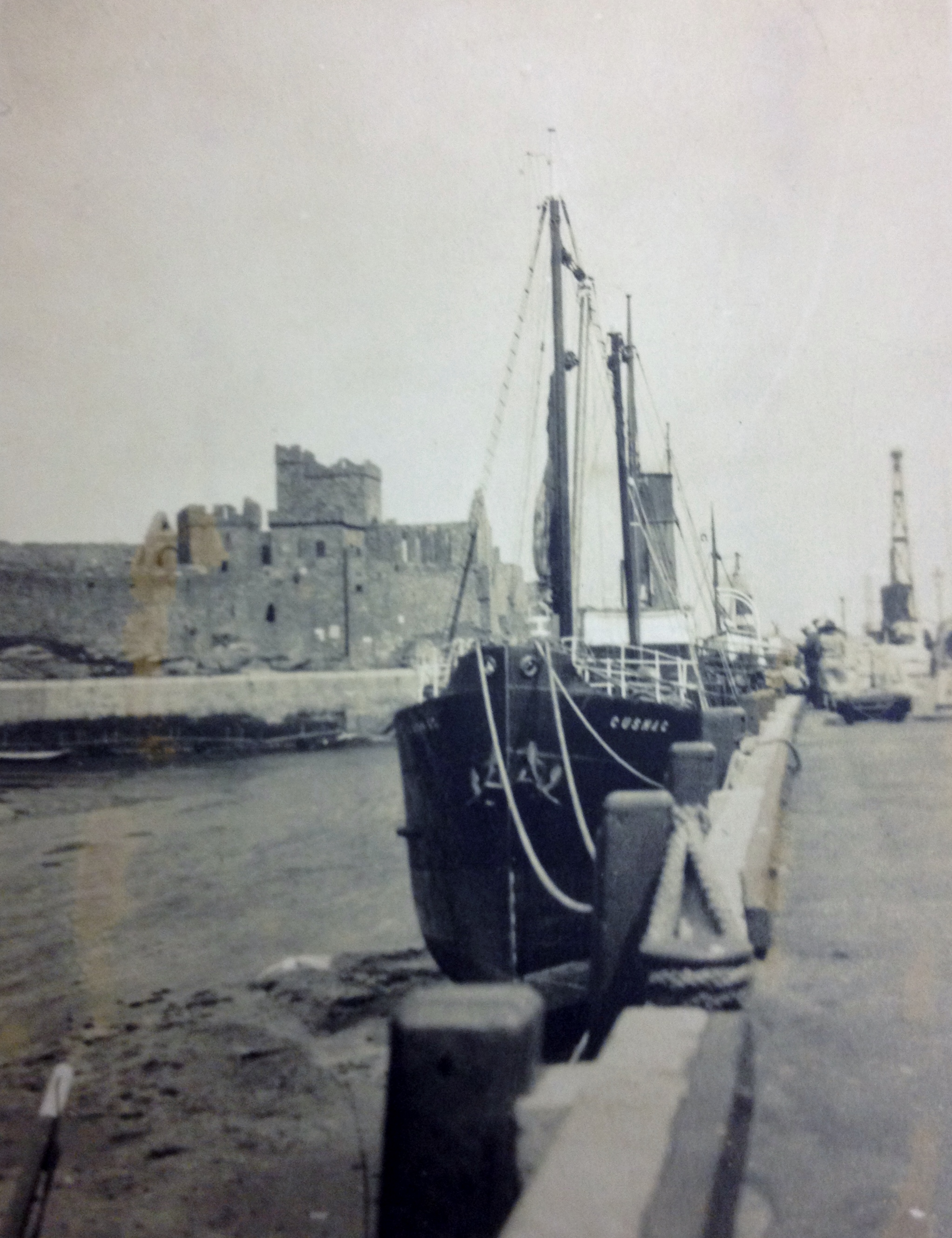
Cushag pictured berthed at Peel.

Built by G. Brown & Co. at Greenock in 1908, she was originally named Ardnagrena. Her first owners were James Waterson & Co. of Antrim, who sold her to Humber Steam Coasters Ltd in 1914. Five years later she was sold once more, this time to a London broker, from whom she was purchased by the Isle of Man Steam Packet Company in May 1920, at a cost of £22,000 (equivalent to £1,116,197).

Small and drawing so little water, she was mostly used for cargo trade in the Island's smaller ports - Port St Mary, Peel, Laxey and Castletown.

After over 20 years service with the company, she was sold to London agents in January 1943, and then went on to Stornoway on the Isle of Lewis for four years. She transferred to Kirkwall in Orkney in 1947.

== Disposal ==
Cushag's register ceases on 20 July 1957, when she was broken up at Grangemouth.

== Gallery ==
Cushag.
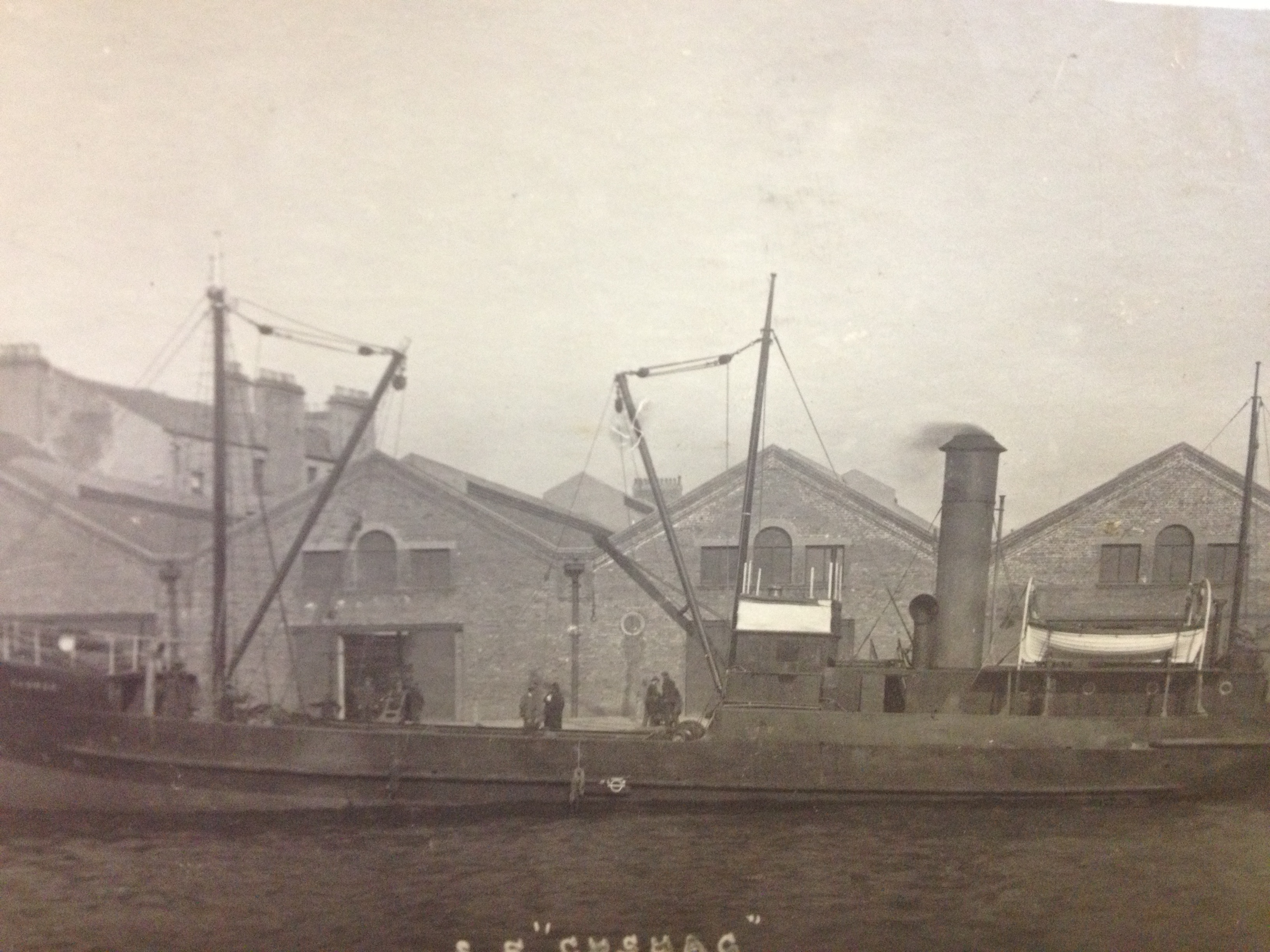
Cushag pictured at the Office Berth, Douglas.
