= MV Fenella (1951) =

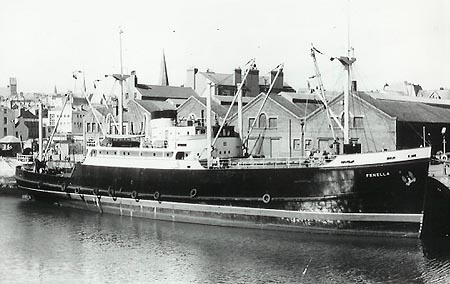
- Fenella at the Office Berth, Douglas

History
- Name: Fenella; 1973: Vasso M
- Owner: 1951–1973: Isle of Man Steam Packet Company
- Operator: 1951–1973 IoMSPCo; 1973–1978: E. Mastichiades, Piraeus, Greece
- Port of registry: Douglas, Isle of Man
- Builder: Ailsa Shipbuilding Company, Troon
- Cost: £163,783
- Launched: Monday, 6 August 1951
- Maiden voyage: 1951
- Out of service: Sold 1973
- Identification: IMO number: 5113565; Official Number: 165289; Code Letters M L F M
- Fate: Caught Fire and sank in the Mediterranean 2 February 1977

General characteristics
- Type: Cargo Vessel
- Tonnage: 1,019 gross register tons (GRT)
- Length: 210 ft 0 in (64.0 m)
- Beam: 37 ft 0 in (11.3 m)
- Depth: 16 ft 6 in (5.0 m)
- Installed power: 1,185 shp (884 kW)
- Propulsion: 7-cylinder British Polar engine (single screw).
- Speed: 12 knots (22 km/h; 14 mph)
- Capacity: Deadweight capacity 750 tons

MV Fenella (III) No. 165289 was a cargo vessel operated by the Isle of Man Steam Packet Company, and the third ship in the Company's history to bear the name. Fenella was built by Ailsa Shipbuilding Company at Troon in 1951, and was the Company's first motor ship and first modern cargo vessel.

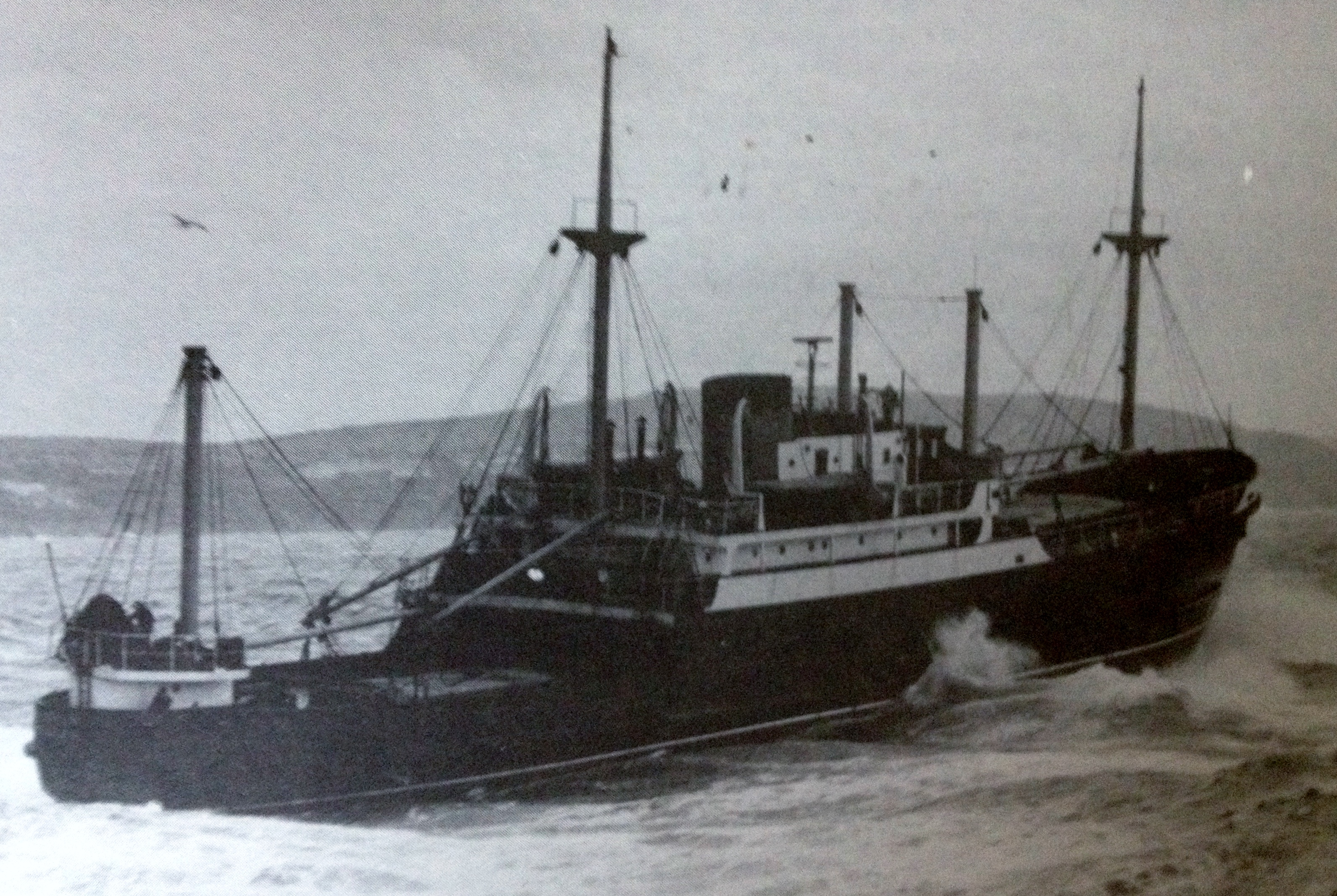
Fenella departs Douglas.

== Dimensions ==
Fenella had a tonnage of 1,019 GRT, a length of 210'; beam 37'; depth 16'6" and with a designed service speed of 12 knots. Her purchase cost was £163,783. She had a 7-cylinder British Polar engine of 1,185 indicated horsepower. When the vessel was high and dry in port at low water, the diesel generators were cooled by circulating water from the ballast tanks as though they were radiators.

== Service life ==
In 1951 the Steam Packet started to modernize its cargo fleet and chose the Ailsa Shipbuilding Company at Troon to build its first motor ship. Fenella carried cars, cattle and general cargo.

== Disposal and loss ==
In the early 1970s containerization resulted in a marked upsurge in freight business. In 1973 alone, there was a 31 per cent rise in cargo. It was first expected that the Peveril operating alongside Ramsey would be able to meet this demand, and the company made the decision to sell the Fenella at the beginning of 1973.

Fenella was sold to Greek owners, E. Mastichiades of Piraeus and renamed Vasso M. On 2 February 1977, after some years plying in the Mediterranean, she caught fire and sank two nautical miles off Borolos Light House, Damietta when en route from Alexandria to Jeddah with a cargo of medical cotton and rice.
