= MV Peveril (1971) =

History
- Name: MV Holmia; Feb 1973: ADS Meteor; Feb 1975: Penda; July 1980: NF Jaguar; 1983: Peveril; Sept 2000: Caribbean Express; Jan 2003: Express
- Owner: Feb 1973 International Chartering Cooperation, Singapore; 1974: Meteor Reederei und Schiffsfahrts GmbH KG, Singapore; Feb 1975: P&O Ferries; Dec 1981: James Fisher and Sons Plc, Barrow; Dec 1992: Isle of Man Steam Packet Co., Douglas; Sept 2000: Marine Express Inc., Panama; Jan 2003: Cadre shipping, Phnom Pehn, Cambodia
- Operator: Feb 1973: P&O Ferries; Jan 1980: Sealink; May 1981: Isle of Man Steam Packet Co., Douglas; 16-24 Nov 1997: Irish Ferries Ltd, Dublin (charter)
- Route: Feb 1973: Heysham - Belfast; Jan 1980: Stranraer - Larne; April 1980: Southampton - Le Havre; May 1981: Douglas - Heysham; Nov 1997: Rosslare - Pembroke; Jan-July 1998: Douglas - Heysham
- Builder: Kristiansand Mekaniske Verksted A/S, Kristiansand, Norway
- Yard number: 216
- Launched: 9 January 1971
- Maiden voyage: 7 April 1971
- Identification: IMO number: 7105029
- Fate: Scrapped 2009

General characteristics
- Tonnage: 1,950 GRT (as built); 5,254 GT (remeasured)
- Length: 106.31 metres (348.8 ft)
- Beam: 16.04 metres (52.6 ft)
- Draught: 4.95 metres (16.2 ft)
- Installed power: 2x 8-cyl Pielstick diesel 6620 kW
- Speed: 19 knots
- Capacity: 56 trucks 51 cars; 12 passengers

MV Peveril was a ro-ro cargo ferry operated in the Irish Sea, initially by P&O Ferries and then Sealink. As NF Jaguar and then Peveril, between 1981 and 1998 she was operated by the Isle of Man Steam Packet Company from Douglas, Isle of Man.

== History ==
Built in 1971 as MV Holmia by Kristiansands Mekaniske Verksted, Norway for Silja Line, Finland, she was operated as ADS Meteor and then Penda by P&O Ferries between Heysham and Belfast from February 1973.

From May 1981, NF Jaguar (the NF denoting Normandy Ferries) was on bareboat charter to the Isle of Man Steam Packet Company operating between Douglas and Heysham in rivalry to the Manx Line, Manx Viking. The company purchased her in December 1982 and renamed her Peveril.

Competition from the rival Manx Line led to the financial collapse of the Isle of Man Steam Packet Company and its subsequent amalgamation with Sealink-Manx Line. From 1 April 1985, the main UK port was to move from Liverpool to Heysham, severing connections with Liverpool after 155 years. Twelve shore staff staged a sit-in at Liverpool trapping the Peveril. She was only released on 8 April after redundancy payments totalling almost a quarter of a million pounds were agreed, adding to the costs of withdrawing from Liverpool. She continued on the route until 10 July 1998.

In September 2000, she was sold to Marine Express Inc., Panama. As Caribbean Express, she left Birkenhead on 27 September. A few days, later she suffered an engine failure in the Bay of Biscay and required repair in Santander, Spain.

In 2002, she was detained in Sotchi, Russia.

Latterly under Cambodian flag, she was sold to Indian breakers and was scrapped in April 2009.
