= SS Conister =

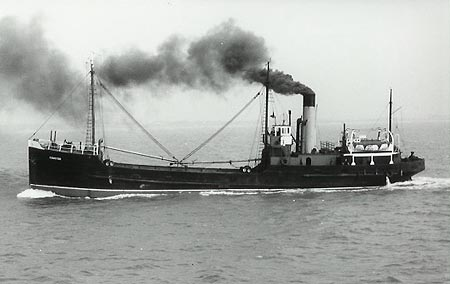
- Conister

History
- Name: Conister; SS Abington
- Owner: 1921–1932: Cheviot Coasters Ltd. Newcastle-upon-Tyne. 1932-1965: Isle of Man Steam Packet Company
- Operator: 1921–1932: Cheviot Coasters Ltd. Newcastle-upon-Tyne. 1932-1965: Isle of Man Steam Packet Company.
- Port of registry: Douglas, Isle of Man
- Builder: Goole Shipbuilding Company, Goole.
- Cost: Purchased by the Isle of Man Steam Packet Company for a sum of £5,500 in 1932
- In service: 1921
- Out of service: 1965
- Identification: Official Number 145470; Code Letters; M K W Q
- Fate: Scrapped by Arnott Young & Co., Glasgow 1965

General characteristics
- Type: Coastal Cargo Ship
- Tonnage: 411 gross register tons (GRT)
- Length: 145 ft 0 in (44.2 m)
- Beam: 24 ft 1 in (7.3 m)
- Depth: 10 ft 9 in (3.3 m)
- Installed power: 430 bhp (320 kW)
- Propulsion: Triple-expansion steam engine, working at 430 bhp (320 kW)
- Speed: 10 knots (12 mph)
- Notes: Conister was the last coal-fired ship in the Company's fleet and the last using reciprocating triple-expansion engines. Conister was the last single-hatch steamer, regularly working in the Irish Sea.

SS Conister (I) No. 145470 – the first vessel in the company's history to bear the name – was a coastal cargo vessel which was purchased by the Isle of Man Steam Packet Company from Cheviot Coasters Ltd, in 1932.

== Construction & dimensions ==
Conister was built by the Goole Shipbuilding Company, Goole, in 1921, and originally named Abington. Her engines were supplied by C. and D. Holmes Ltd of Hull. Her construction costs are not recorded. She was a single-hatch coaster which had a length of 145'; beam 24'1"; depth 10'9" with a tonnage of 411 GRT. Her machinery was aft, and she had two masts forward of the funnel.

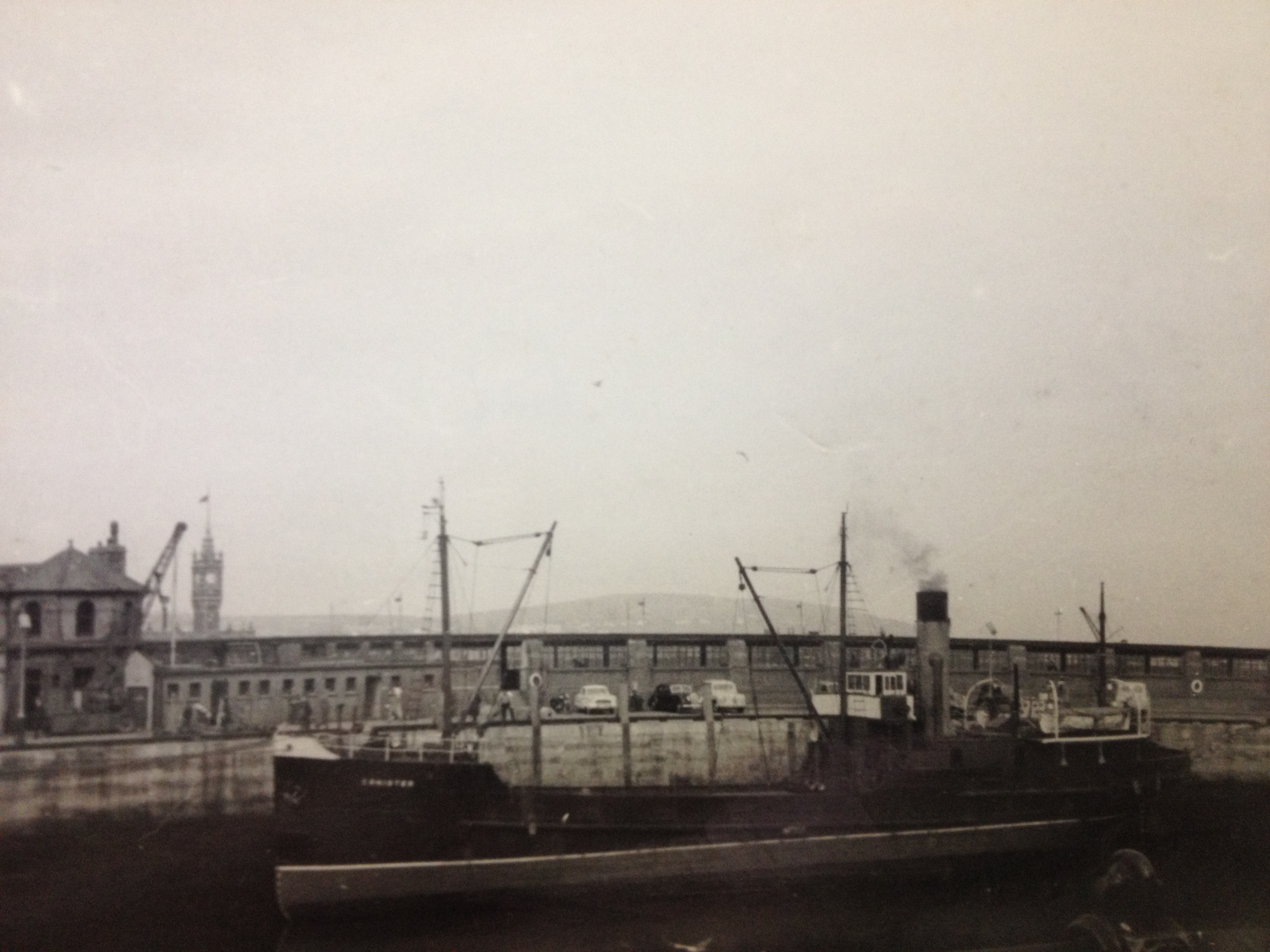
Conister at the Watch House Berth, Douglas.

== Service life ==
Originally named Abington, she entered service with Cheviot Coasters Ltd. in November 1921, operating from Newcastle-upon-Tyne. She was bought by the Isle of Man Steam Packet Company in January 1932 for £5,500, (equivalent to £482,255 in 2023) when her name was changed to Conister.

Conister was engaged in general cargo work and was frequently to be seen in Ramsey, unloading goods from Liverpool, before sailing on to Douglas.

Conister was the last coal-fired ship in the company's fleet and the last using reciprocating triple-expansion engines. During the Second World War, Conister was kept busy maintaining the lifeline to the Island. On 27 October 1940 Conister was severely damaged by a bomb during an air attack.

== Disposal ==
With the impending introduction into service of her successor MV Ramsey, Conister was put up for sale. On 26 January 1965 she was sold to Arnott Young & Co., Glasgow, and was taken under tow to Dalmuir by the tug Campaigner for scrapping.

Conister was the last single-hatch steamer, regularly working in the Irish Sea.

== Gallery ==
SS Conister
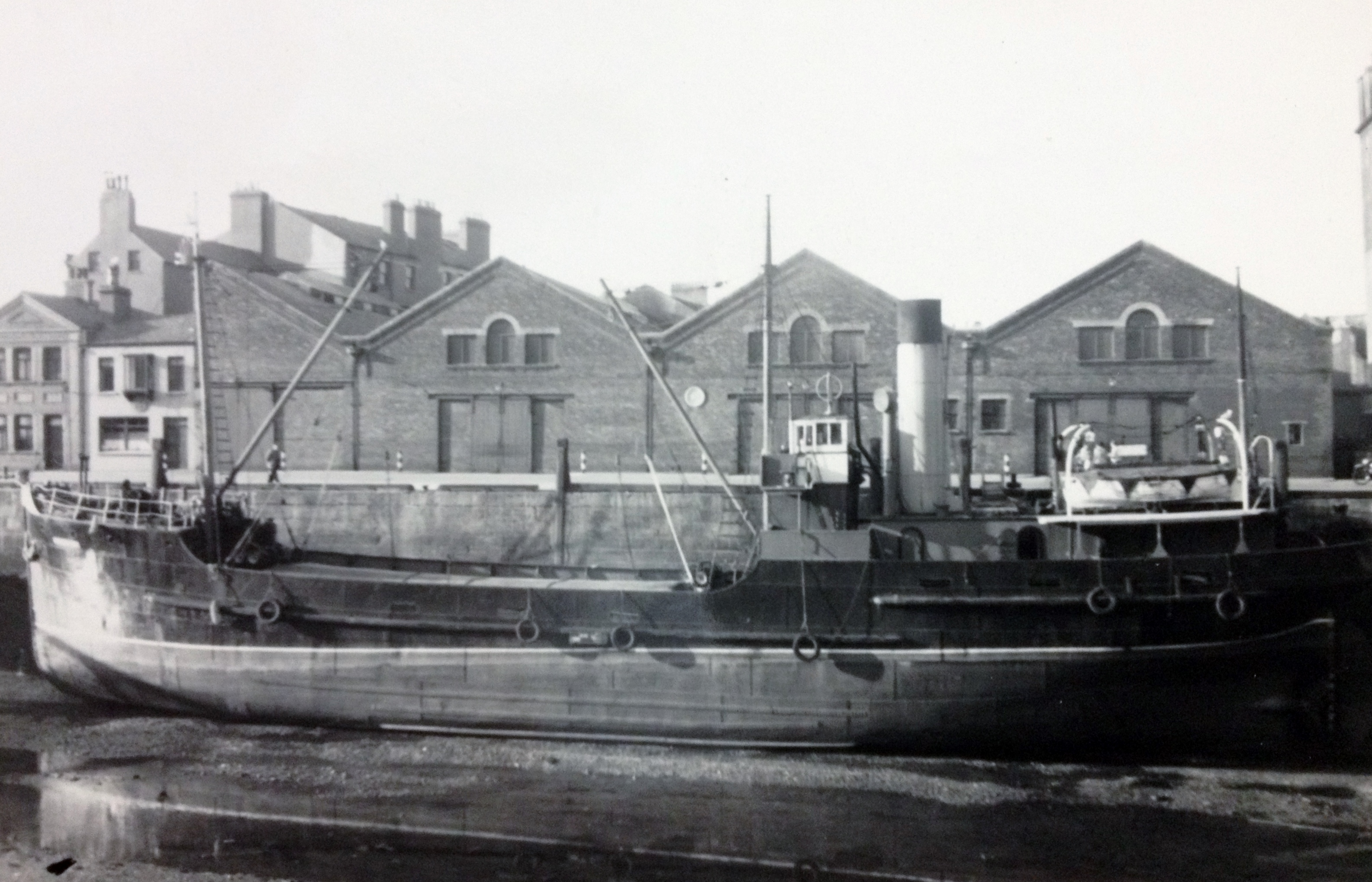
Conister, berthed at the Office Berth, Douglas, Isle of Man

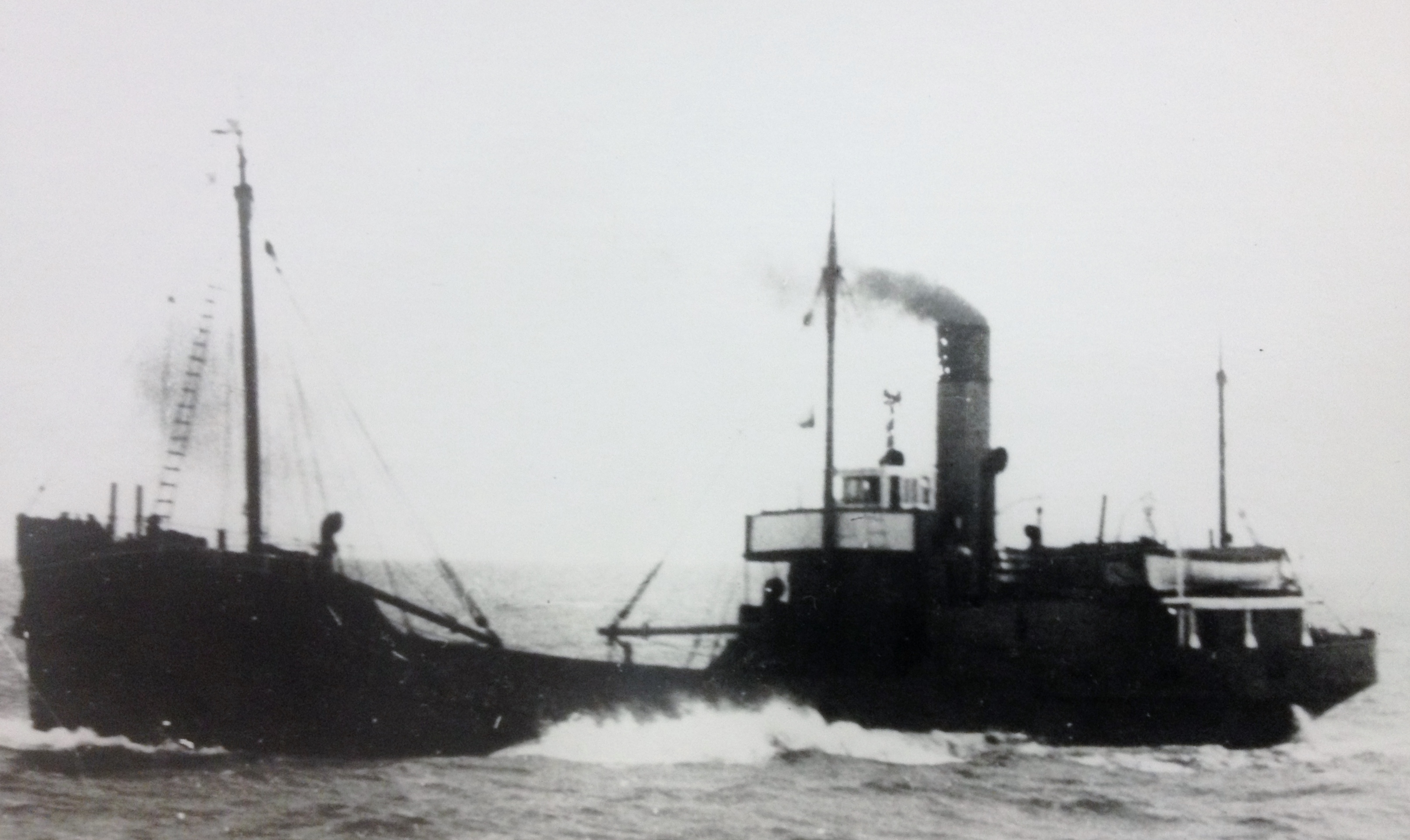
Conister approaching Douglas
