= Free Enterprise III =

Ferry built in 1966

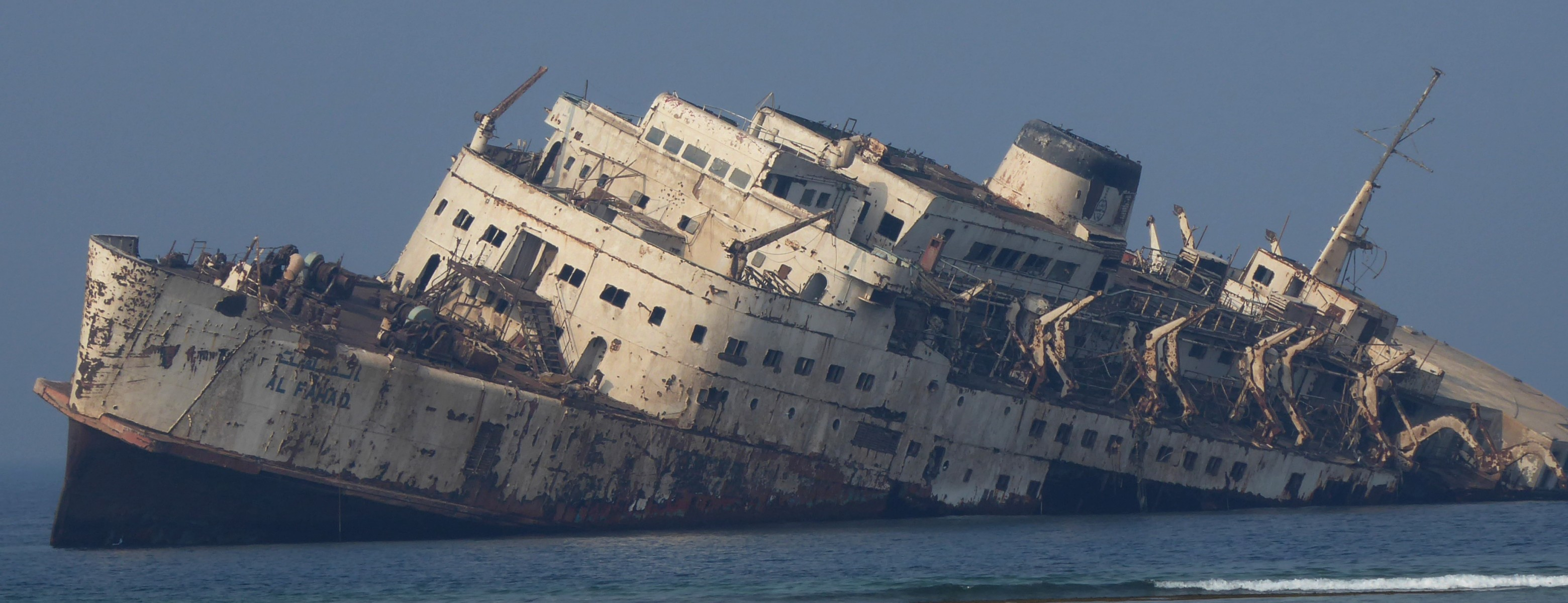
- Al Fahad wreck

History
- Name: Free Enterprise III (until 11 May 1982); 1984: Tamira (until 2 Sept 1984); 1984: Mona's Isle (until Apr 1985); 1986: Al Fahad
- Owner: Stanhope SS Co Ltd.; 1984: Mira Shipping Line, Valletta, Malta; 1984: Isle of Man Steam Packet Company, Douglas; 1986: Hasan Sadaka Hitta, Jeddah
- Operator: Townsend Car Ferries Ltd.; 1984-85: IOMSPCo.
- Port of registry: 1984: Douglas Isle of Man; 1986: Jeddah, Saudi Arabia
- Route: 1966-84: Channel ferry; 1984-85: Douglas - Heysham; 1986-98: Jeddah - Suez
- Builder: NV Werf "Gusto", Schiedam, Netherlands
- Yard number: 538
- Launched: 14 May 1966
- Maiden voyage: 22 July 1966
- Identification: IMO number: 6611461
- Fate: Wrecked near Jeddah 2004

General characteristics
- Tonnage: 4,657 GRT; 839 DWT
- Length: 117.51 m (385.5 ft)
- Beam: 19.08 m (62.6 ft)
- Draught: 4.06 m (13.3 ft)
- Installed power: 2 x 12-cylinder, four-stroke J & K Smit-MAN RBL6612 and 2 x six-cylinder units of 11,540 bhp at 275 rpm
- Propulsion: twin-screw
- Speed: 20 kn (23 mph)
- Capacity: 1,200 passengers; 120 cars

Free Enterprise III was a Ro-Pax vessel built in 1966 as a cross-channel ferry, operated by Townsend Thoresen mainly on the Calais and Zeebrugge routes from Dover. She was sold to Egyptian owners in 1986 and wrecked in the Red Sea in 2004.

Like many of the other Townsend fleet, The Free Enterprise III was designed by naval architect Wallace James Ayers.

== History ==
=== Townsend Brothers ===
Free Enterprise III was built in 1966 by I.C.H. Holland, Werf Gusto Yard, Schiedam, Netherlands, for Townsend Brothers Ferries. In 1968, the company became European Ferries, continuing to operate services as Townsend Thoresen.

=== Isle of Man Steam Packet Company ===
In 1984, Free Enterprise III was sold to Maltese owners, Mira Shipping Line, Valletta, and renamed Tamira. She returned to UK waters later the same year when she was purchased by the Isle of Man Steam Packet Company. Renamed Mona's Isle, the sixth vessel in the company's history to bear the name, she entered service following alterations which saw additional accommodation added. Her service life saw her plying on the company's main Douglas - Heysham schedule with her service commencing in April 1985. However her short-comings were quickly identified. Numerous problems persisted, not least in docking the vessel which required the services of the Laxey Towing Company. Her time in Steam Packet service was brief and the Mona's Isle was laid up in October 1985.

=== Sadaka Shipping ===
She was sold again in April 1986, to Egyptian owners, Sadaka Shipping, who renamed her Al Fahad. She served in Saudi Arabia for another twelve years. Suffering engine problems in June 2004, she anchored in the Red Sea and was subsequently abandoned as a wreck 35 km south of Jeddah.

The wreck has subsequently become popular as a scuba dive site with the remains of the ship within 200 metres of the shoreline.

== Service ==
Free Enterprise III operated on the Dover-Calais service, adding Dover-Zeebrugge from 1967. During the summer of 1974, she spent time on the Cairnryan-Larne route. In summer 1981, Free Enterprise III operated between Portsmouth and Cherbourg.

== See also ==
- List of shipwrecks
