= SS Fenella (1936) =

Passenger steam ship

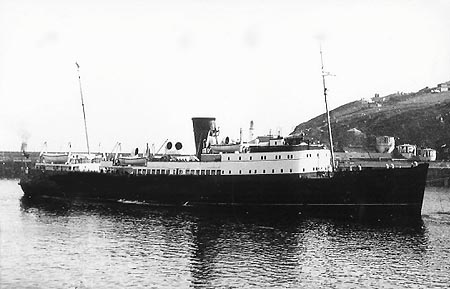
- Fenella at Douglas, Isle of Man

History

Isle of Man
- Name: Fenella
- Owner: Isle of Man Steam Packet Company
- Port of registry: Douglas, Isle of Man
- Route: Douglas-Liverpool, Douglas-Fleetwood
- Builder: Vickers Armstrong, Barrow-in-Furness
- Cost: £203,550
- Launched: 16 December 1936
- Maiden voyage: 1937
- Home port: Douglas, Isle of Man
- Identification: Official Number 145310; Code Letters G Z N Y
- Fate: Sunk at Dunkirk, 29 May 1940

General characteristics
- Type: Passenger steamer
- Tonnage: 2,375.53 GRT
- Length: 314 ft 6 in (95.9 m)
- Beam: 46 ft (14.0 m)
- Draught: 18 ft (5.5 m)
- Ice class: N/A
- Installed power: 8,500 shp (6,300 kW)
- Propulsion: Twin-screw geared Parson's turbines, working at a steam pressure of 250 pounds per square inch (1,700 kPa), driving two sets of single-reduction turbines, developing 8,500 shp (6,300 kW).
- Speed: 21 knots (39 km/h; 24 mph)
- Capacity: 1968 passengers
- Crew: 68

TSS (RMS) Fenella (II) No. 145310 was a pre-Second World War passenger steamer built by Vickers Armstrong at Barrow-in-Furness in 1936, for service with the Isle of Man Steam Packet Company. She was sunk by air attack during the evacuation of Dunkirk in May 1940.

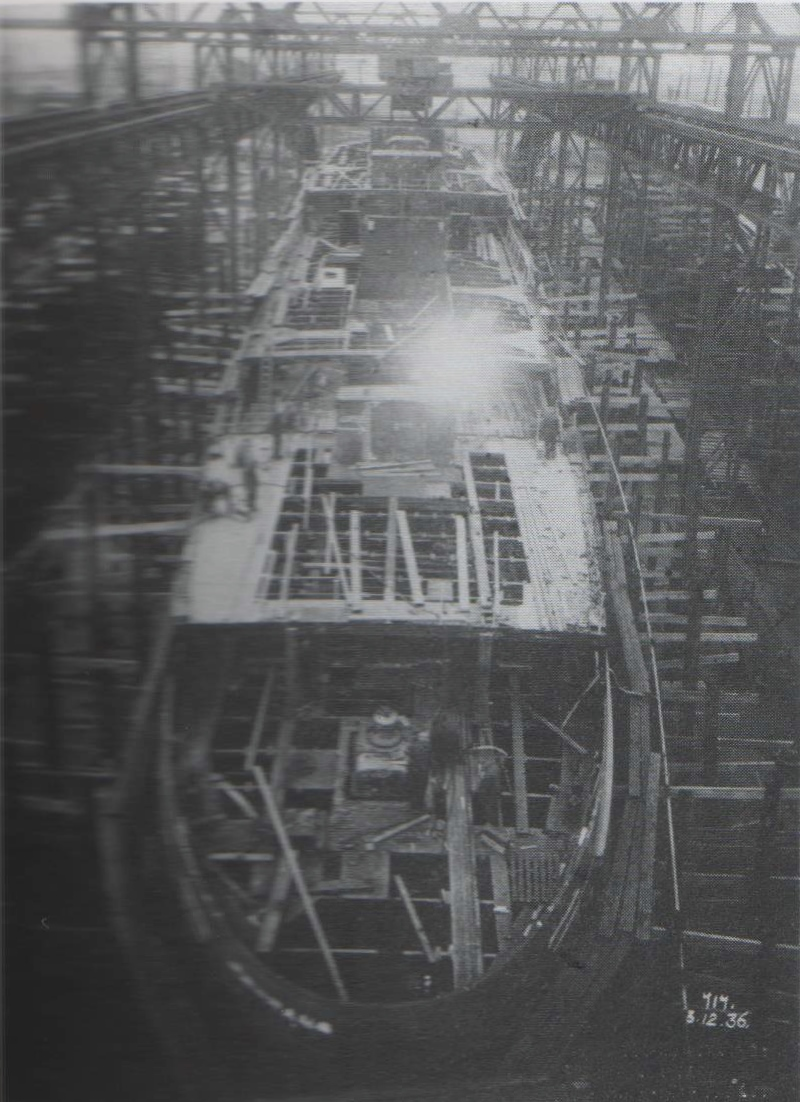
Fenella under construction.

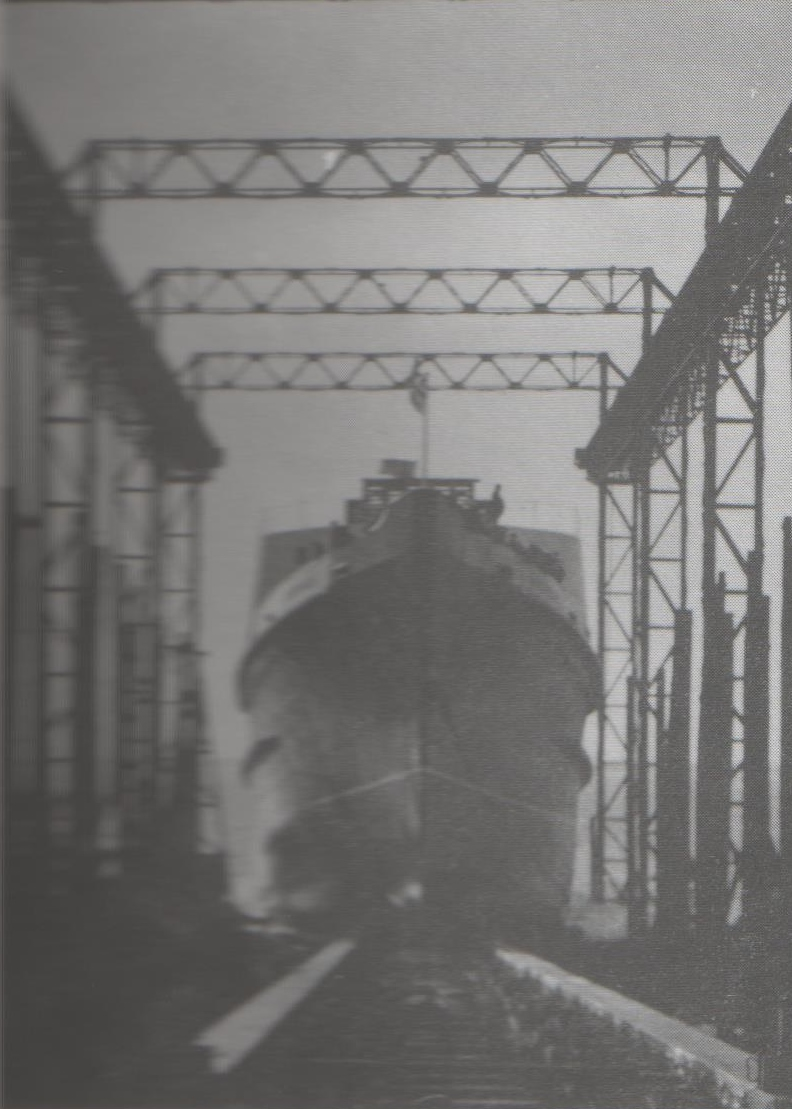
Fenella is launched at Barrow; 16 December 1936.

Fenella's sister ship Tynwald was also lost during the war.

== Design and construction ==
Identical to her twin sister Tynwald, Fenella had a registered tonnage of 2376; a beam of 46'; length 314'6" and a depth of 18'. Both Tynwald and Fenella were designed with a service speed of 21 knots, accommodation for a crew of 68, and certificated to carry 1968 passengers. Both vessels were fitted with twin-screw geared turbines, and had water tube boilers with a steam pressure of 250 pounds per square inch (1,700 kPa), and two sets of single-reduction turbines, developing 8,500 shp (6,300 kW).

Both Fenella and Tynwald were launched at Barrow on the same day, 16 December 1936.

Whilst the twins were identical in almost every facet, there were two subtle differences incorporated into their external appearance so as to be able to differentiate between the two. The Fenella had a yard running out from her foremast which had been installed specifically so as she could be identified from a distance. The strake, or gunwale, around the main deck was white on the Tynwald whilst it was black on the Fenella. The bows on both ships bore not only their names but the Three Legs of Man symbol.

There were also some quite distinctive differences in the internal decor of the twins. The first class dining saloon of the Fenella consisted of English chestnut, whilst on the Tynwald the woodwork was Queensland walnut. In the first class lounge of the Fenella figured Australian walnut provided the setting for a colour scheme in blue and fawn, whereas the Tynwald's was panelled in chestnut the general colour scheme being in green and gold.

The smoke room panelling was walnut in the Fenella and oak in the Tynwald. In addition the third class ladies lounge the walls were panelled with weathered sycamore in the Fenella and white sycamore in the Tynwald.

== Service life ==
Smaller than their immediate predecessors, they were designed specifically for winter work and were the first ships in the company to have cruiser sterns. Fenella made her maiden_voyage to Douglas on Saturday May 1, 1937, when she made passage from Liverpool. During the course of her passage she received a salute from the Ramsey Steamship Company's Ben Varrey which was inbound to Liverpool.

Both ships worked on the heavy seasonal traffic on the main Douglas-Liverpool route, and both were much appreciated by passengers, especially in winter weather. With large public rooms, both twins were furnished to a high standard, and apart from slight decorative differences, they were of similar external appearance, except that Tynwald had her upper strake painted white, whereas on Fenella it was black.

On Tuesday 16 November 1937, a storm, with associated south-easterly gales, forced Fenella to seek shelter on the protected western side of the Isle of Man near Peel. She proceeded to Douglas early on the morning of Wednesday 17 November, to take the morning sailing to Liverpool.

However, whilst berthing in challenging conditions, a mooring rope fouled one of her propellers. Fenella was taken to the inner harbour at Douglas, where divers tried and failed to free the rope. Due to the ebbing tide in the inner harbour, Fenella then went aground, and the sailing was cancelled.

That same day, her sister Tynwald also had problems trying to berth in Douglas, which before the construction of the Princess Alexandra Pier in 1984, was particularly hazardous during strong easterly winds. Taking that morning's sailing from Liverpool to Douglas, Tynwald had great difficulty berthing at the King Edward VIII Pier, and suffered damage to the belting on her starboard side, over a distance of about five metres, as well as suffering damage to her plating. Finally she secured alongside, and having discharged her passengers and mail, Tynwald then departed for Liverpool at 15:50, taking the passengers and mail which should have left on Fenella's morning sailing.

Fenella then had the rope removed from her propeller, and resumed normal service the following day.

A further mishap occurred on the River Mersey on Monday October 24, 1938, when the Fenella collided with one of the Mersey ferries, the Hinderton. Slight damage was sustained to Fenella's bows however no one was hurt.

On Tuesday 17 January 1939, whilst lying at anchor in the River Mersey, having taken the sailing from Douglas to Liverpool, Fenella was run into by a cargo ship, the SS Eastleigh, which had arrived from Karachi, and was proceeding to berth at Bromborough Dock. Part of Fenella's belting was carried away, and damage was sustained to one of her lifeboats, along with damage to her plating. Fenella was taken to the Prince's Landing Stage, where she was inspected by representatives of the Board of Trade. Temporary repairs were carried out, and Fenella was able to sail from Liverpool to Douglas the following day.

At this time Tynwald was undergoing an overhaul, and had been replaced by Mona's Isle which was working in conjunction with the Fenella. Tynwald was due to resume service, replacing Mona's Isle, on Thursday, 19 January, but this was delayed until 21 January. Fenella then underwent repairs to the damage she had sustained in the collision with the Eastleigh, and Tynwald joined Mona's Isle, which had to be kept in service substituting for Fenella.

== War service and loss ==
Requisitioned in the first week of the war as a personnel carrier, Fenella's first few months were relatively uneventful. Then, on 28 May 1940, Fenella joined no less than seven of her steam packet sisters and made passage to Dunkirk.

On 29 May 1940, under the command of her Master, Captain W. Cubbon, Fenella made her first trip into the evacuation area. She started to embark troops from the East Pier, and had 650 on board when she came under heavy fire in the third massed air attack of that day. She was hit by three bombs in quick succession, the first bomb hitting her directly on the promenade deck, the second bomb hitting the pier, blowing lumps of concrete through the ship's side below the waterline, and the third exploded between the pier and the ship's side, wrecking the engine room.

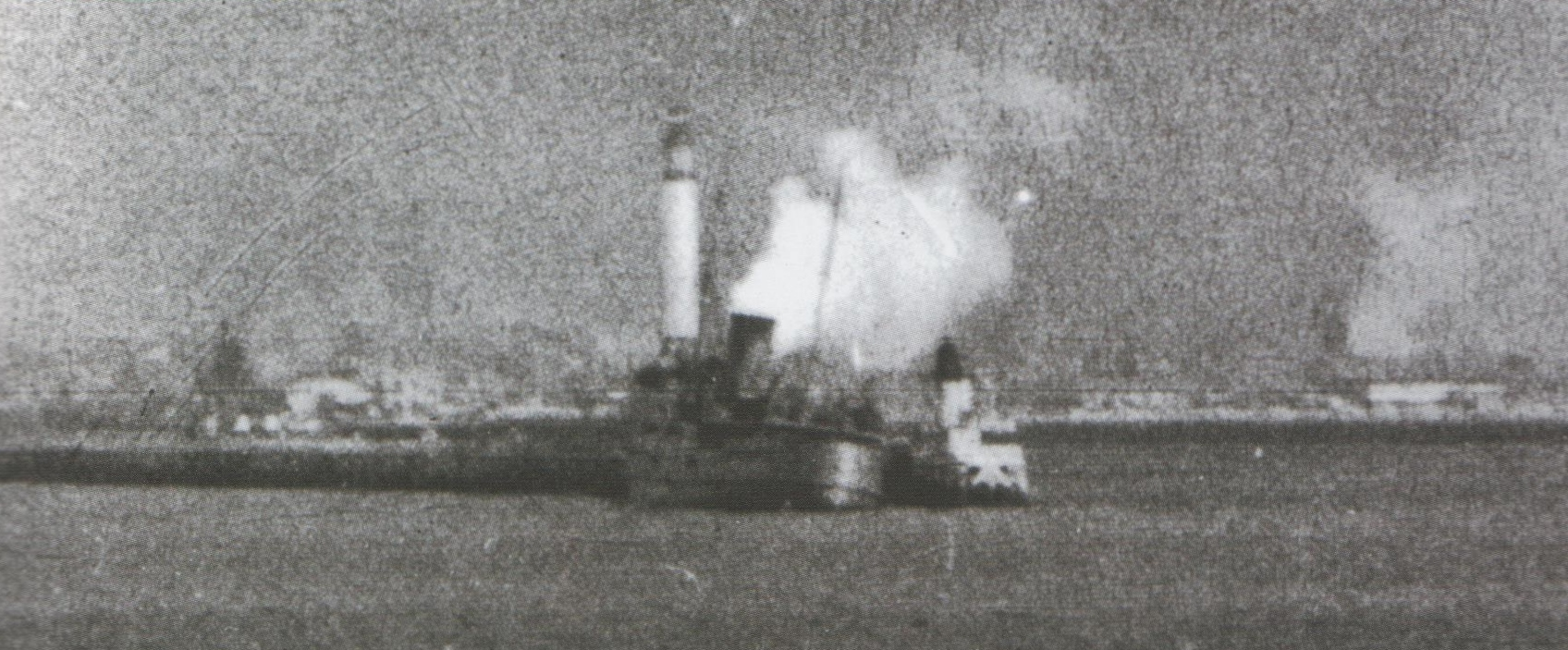
Fenella comes under air attack, whilst berthed alongside the East Mole at Dunkirk, 29 May 1940.

Fenella was abandoned and later sank. The troops were disembarked onto the pier, where they were picked up by HMS Crested Eagle, the famous old London pleasure steamer. This too, was bombed and beached.

The survivors of Fenella's crew were later picked up by the Dutch skoot, Patria, which was under Royal Navy command. Others of the crew had succeeded in getting ashore via the pier and had been taken on to the Crested Eagle, only to receive a direct hit.

Fenella had gone into the harbour with a crew of 48, all Steam Packet men and most of them Manxmen. Four men had been left behind on leave. In all, 33 men got back to Dover, where one died of wounds. Many had been wounded, some seriously.

Some weeks later, a postcard was received from junior steward Thomas Helsby, who was 19 years of age, and came from Liverpool. He had last been seen, terribly burned, as Fenella was foundering after the bomb attack. It transpired that he had been taken prisoner of war – the only Steam Packet Company man to be taken prisoner in all the operations of its ships in wartime – and was in a hospital in occupied Belgium. The German surgeons did an expert job on him, and he was repatriated before the end of the war, and eventually rejoined the Steam Packet.

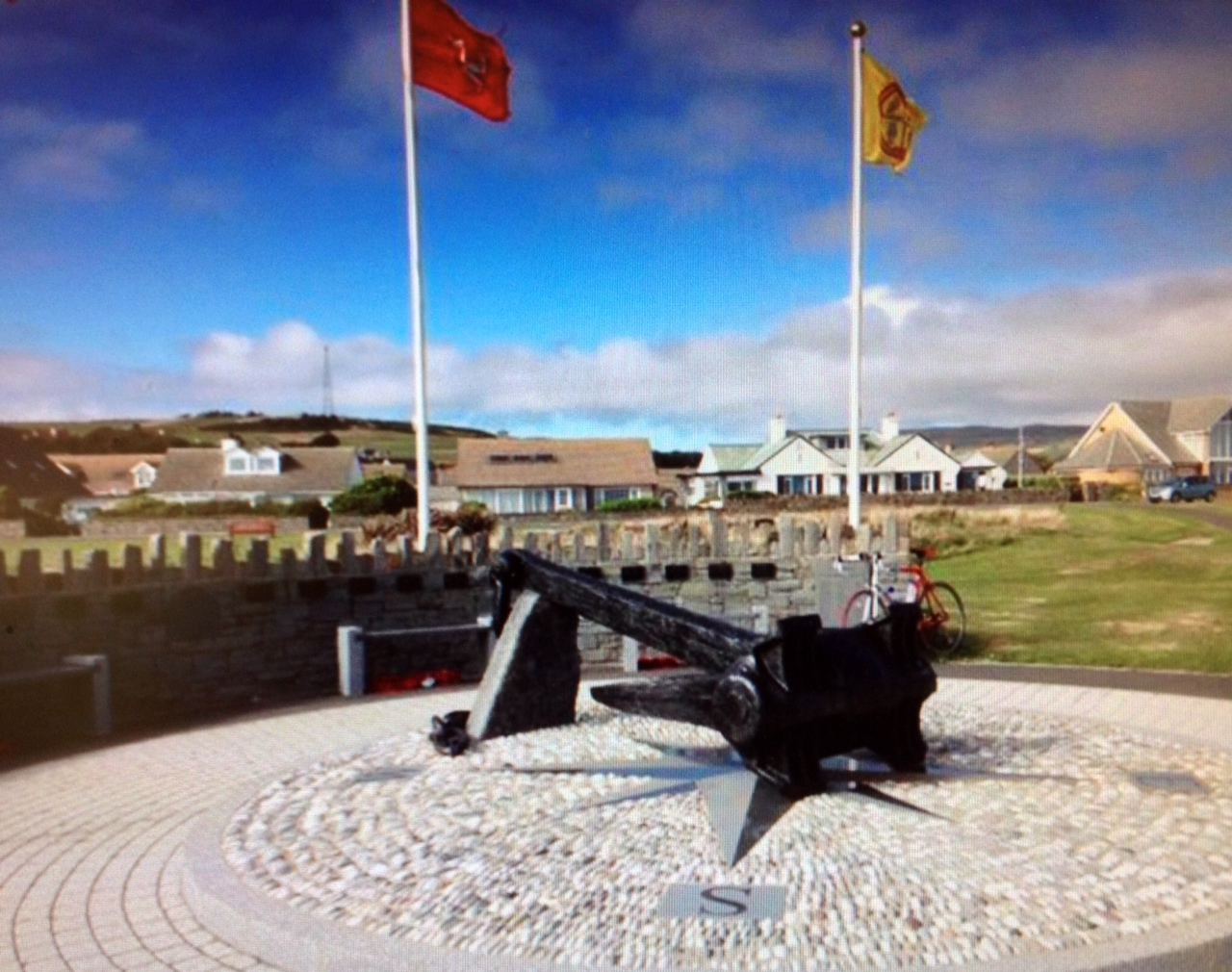
Memorial at Kallow Point, Port St Mary, commemorating the loss of Mona's Queen, King Orry, and Fenella.

Operation Dynamo, whilst widely regarded as the Steam Packet's "finest hour", also saw its blackest day. Three vessels were lost from the fleet on 29 May: Mona's Queen, King Orry and Fenella.

== Ultimate fate ==
The sinking of Fenella was later followed by a theory that the ship had been raised by the enemy, fitted with new engines, and used under the name Reval. Much later, the belief grew that she had been taken over by the Russians, following the collapse of Germany.

F B O'Friel has arrived at what is probably the authentic version after help from a correspondent who searched the Kriegsmarine files at Freiburg. From the papers unearthed, it seems certain that the wrecked Fenella was eventually removed piecemeal from the harbour as scrap. The Germans had classified her as Wreck No. 11. Near her, had been Wreck No. 8, the steamer Bawtry. This ship was raised in March 1941, and was later repaired at Antwerp and declared a 'prize of war'. She was taken over by a Kiel shipping firm in 1943 under the name of Rival, only to be completely destroyed in the massive RAF air raid on Hamburg on the night of 31 December 1944.
