= Rushen Heritage Trust =

The Rushen Heritage Trust is an organisation which aims to build knowledge and appreciation of the heritage, history and landscape of the South of the Isle of Man. It was established in 2014, comprises a number of volunteer-run teams and puts on a number of major exhibitions each year across Rushen sheading.

== Establishment ==
The Trust was established by Hugh and Sandra Davidson, who first formed an initial steering group in October 2013 of Phil Gawne, Laurence Skelly and Juan Watterson (Rushen MHKs) and Steve George (chairman of Port Erin Traders' Association). Following a public consultation, an initial public meeting about the potential formation of the Trust was held in Port St Mary Town Hall on 3 April 2014, where 120 attended and 60 people volunteered to be a part of the Trust. The Trust then appointed Graham Hall as its first Heritage Manager in June 2014, and then officially launched on 25 July 2014, the day it was incorporated and registered as a Charity (939).

== Organisation ==
The Trust is led by volunteers organised into Heritage Actions Teams (HATs) focussing on five key areas of Rushen heritage:

- Tourism
- WWII Internment
- Manx Language, Culture & Art
- Story of the Sea
- Story of the Land

The board members of the Trust consist: Robert Graham (Chairman), Ali Graham (Treasurer), Staffan Overgaard, Juan Watterson, Connie Herdman, Cathy Clucas, Godfrey Egee.

== Work ==
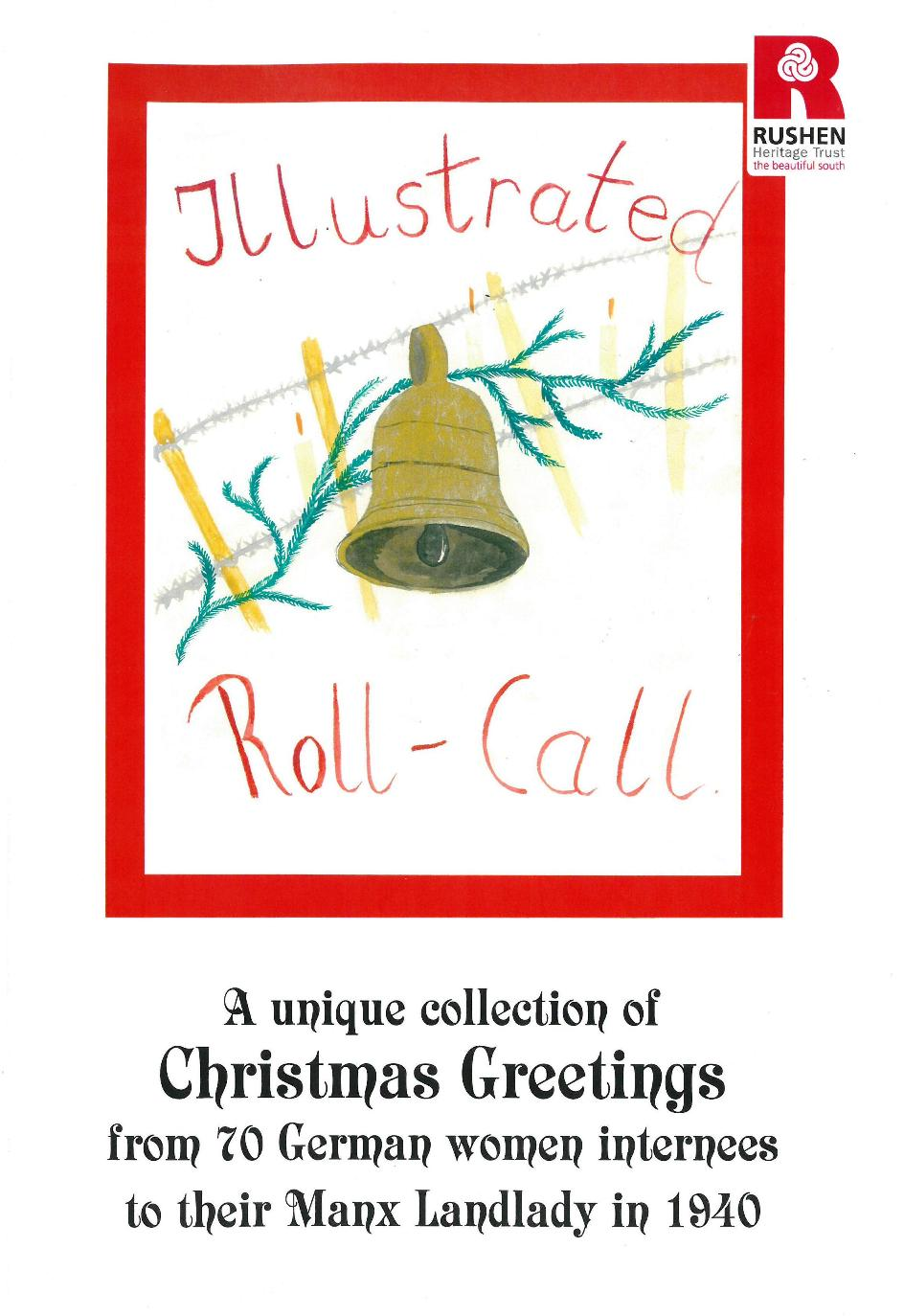
'The Illustrated Roll-Call,' published by the Rushen Heritage Trust in 2015

The stated purpose of the Trust is "To preserve, enhance, and celebrate the rich heritage of Rushen; and thereby to build wide community involvement."

Since 2021, Rushen Heritage has had its own Heritage Centre, the former bus shelter in Bridson Street, Port Erin. The Centre is open for large parts of the year and during special events. It features rolling exhibitions on a wide variety of local subjects.

As well as a number of smaller exhibitions, the Trust has held the following major exhibitions:

- Friend or Foe?: An exhibition marking the 75th anniversary of the opening of the World War II Rushen internment camp for women originating from within the Axis powers. (19 May - 14 June 2015)
- The Glory Days of Rushen Tourism: An exhibition on the history and people of five hotels in Rushen - Bayqueen, Falcons Nest, Belle Vue/Royal, Perwick Bay Hotel and The Bay. (13 – 26 July 2015)

The Trust has also published a book, Illustrated Roll Call, on 18 May 2015: a collection of Christmas greetings from 70 German women internees and presented to their Manx landlady, Marjorie Crighton, in 1940.
