= SS Tynwald (1936) =

Isle of Man passenger vessel

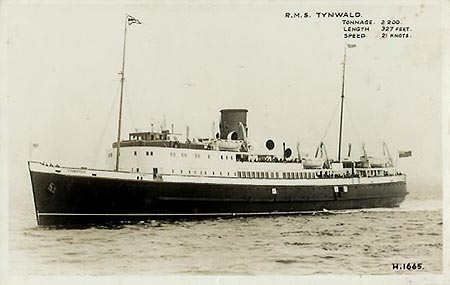
- RMS Tynwald

History

Isle of Man
- Name: Tynwald
- Owner: 1936–1940: Isle of Man Steam Packet Company
- Operator: Isle of Man Steam Packet Company
- Port of registry: Douglas, Isle of Man
- Ordered: 1936
- Builder: Vickers-Armstrong, Barrow-in-Furness, United Kingdom
- Laid down: 1935
- Launched: 16 December 1936
- Completed: 1937
- In service: 1937
- Out of service: Transferred to the Royal Navy as HMS Tynwald, late 1940
- Home port: Douglas, Isle of Man
- Identification: Official Number 165281; Code Letters G Z R L
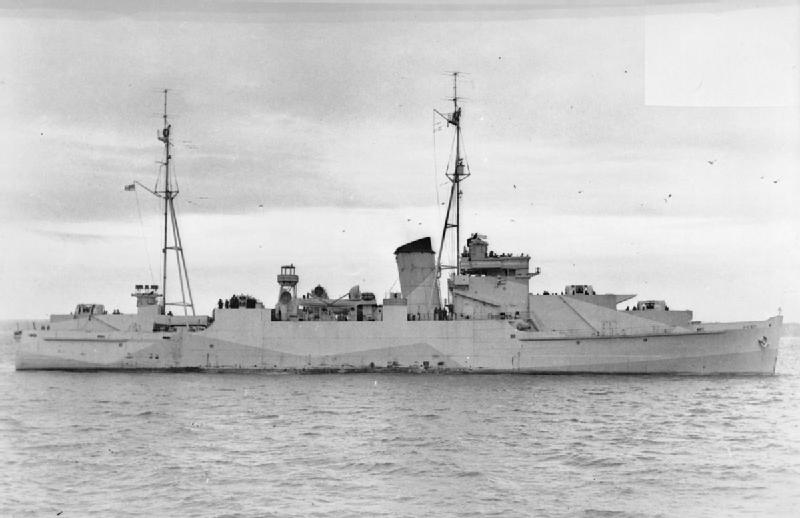
- HMS Tynwald

United Kingdom
- Name: HMS Tynwald
- Commissioned: 1 October 1941
- Fate: Sunk on 12 November 1942

General characteristics
- Type: Passenger steamer
- Tonnage: 2,375 GRT
- Length: 314 ft 6 in (95.9 m)
- Beam: 46 ft (14.0 m)
- Depth: 18 ft (5.5 m)
- Installed power: 8,500 shp (6,300 kW)
- Propulsion: Twin-screw geared Parson's turbines; steam pressure of 250 pounds per square inch (1,700 kPa); two sets of single-reduction turbines; 8,500 shp (6,300 kW)
- Speed: 21.7 knots (25.0 mph)
- Capacity: 1968 passengers
- Crew: 68

TSS (RMS) Tynwald No. 165281 was a passenger vessel which served with the Isle of Man Steam Packet Company from 1937 until she was requisitioned for war service at the end of 1940. She was the fourth ship in the line's history to bear the name. Tynwald was sunk in November 1942 off the coast of French North Africa.

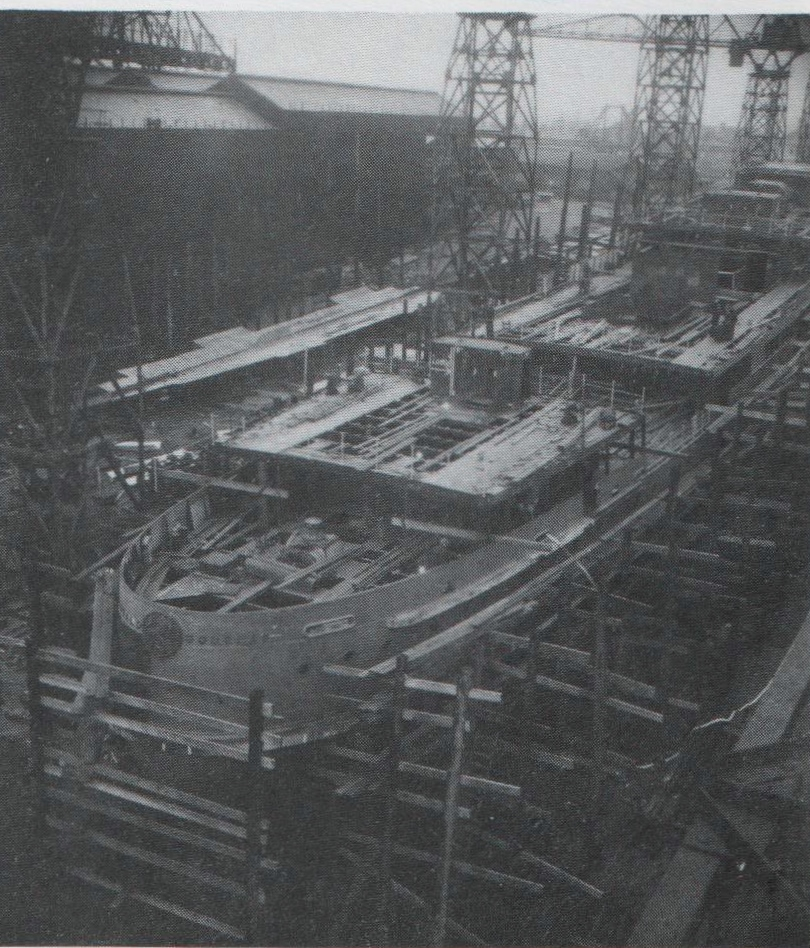
Tynwald under construction.

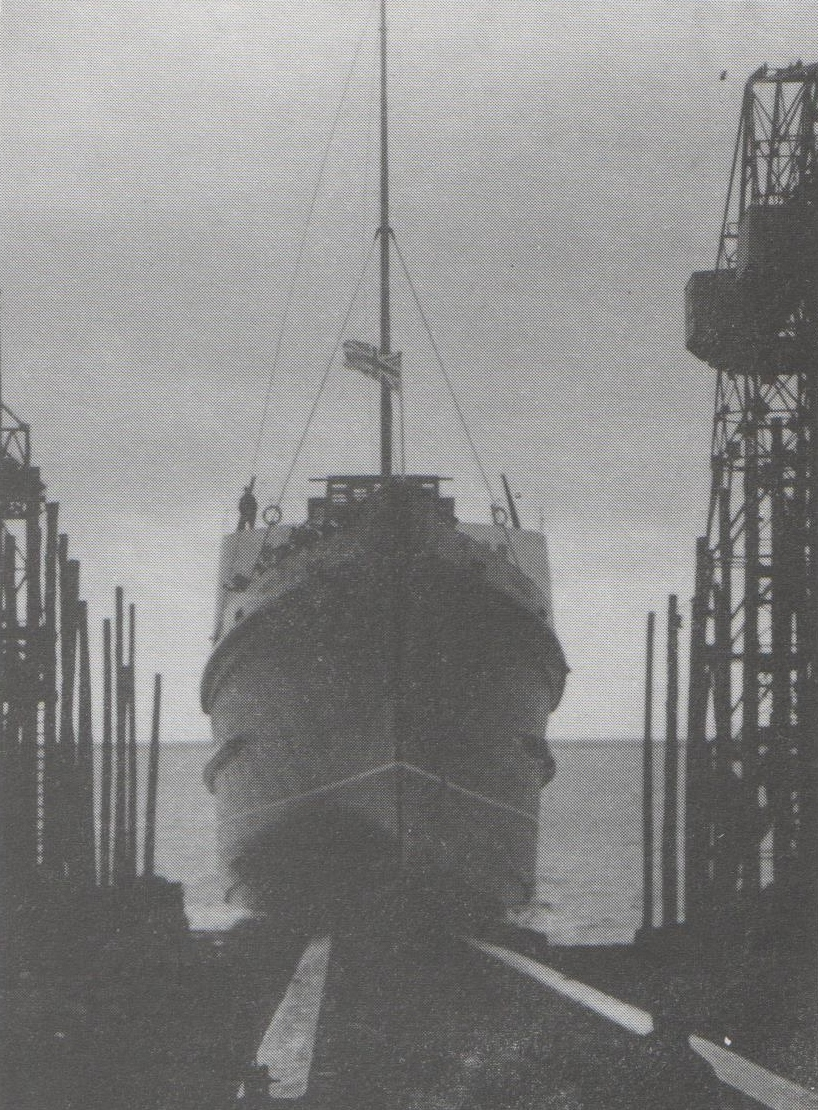
Tynwald is launched at Barrow-in-Furness, 16 December 1936.

== Design and construction ==
Tynwald and her identical twin Fenella were built by Vickers Armstrong at Barrow-in-Furness and launched on the same day, 16 December 1936.

Tynwald had a gross registered tonnage of 2376t, a beam of 46', a length of 314'6", a draught of 18' and a design speed of 21 knots. Both Tynwald and Fenella, had crew accommodation for 68, and a capacity for 1968 passengers.

Whilst the twins were identical in almost every facet, there were two subtle differences incorporated into their external appearance so as to be able to differentiate between the two. The Fenella had a yard running out from her foremast which had been installed specifically so as she could be identified from a distance. The strake, or gunwale, around the main deck was black on the Fenella whilst it was white on the Tynwald. The bows on both ships bore not only their names but the Three Legs of Man symbol.

There were also some quite distinctive differences in the internal decor of the twins. In the first class dining saloon of the Tynwald the woodwork was Queensland walnut, whilst on the Fenella it consisted of English chestnut. In the first class lounge of the Tynwald, figured chestnut provided the setting for a colour scheme in green and gold whereas the Fenalla's first class lounge was panelled in Australian walnut, the general colour scheme being in blue and fawn.

The smoke room panelling was oak in the Tynwald and walnut in the Fenella. In addition the third class ladies lounge the walls were panelled with white sycamore in the Tynwald and weathered sycamore in the Fenella.

== Steam Packet Company service ==
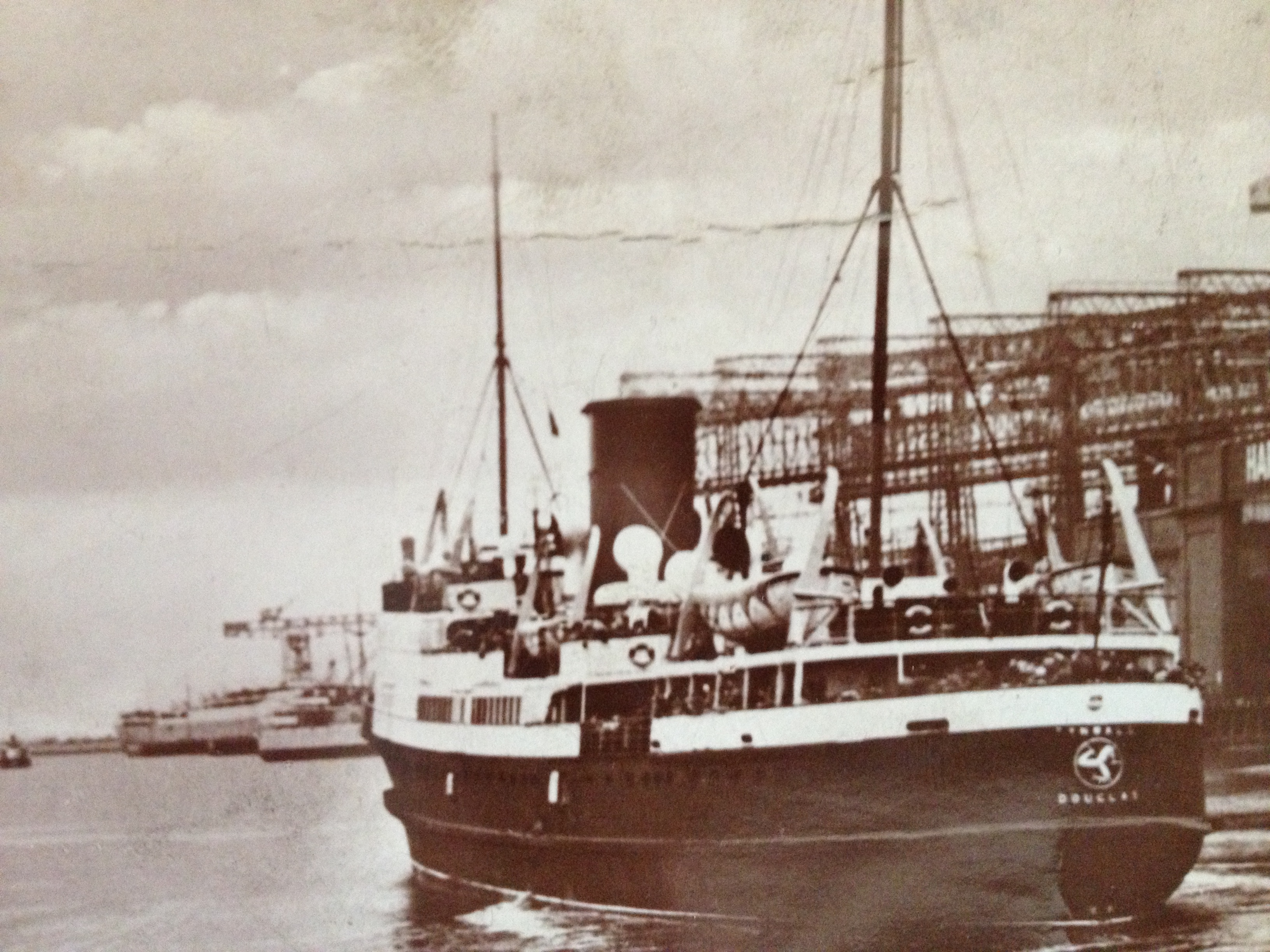
Tynwald in pre-war passenger service, pictured leaving Belfast.

Like her sister ship Fenella, Tynwald was intended primarily to be used on the winter service between Liverpool and Douglas.

They were virtually identical apart from slight decorative differences, the noticeable external difference being Tynwald had her upper strake painted white, whereas on Fenella it was black. Spacious lounges were a feature of both ships which were furnished to a high standard.

On 1 October 1937, the Tynwald conveyed the newly appointed Lieutenant Governor of the Isle of Man, Vice Admiral Leveson-Gower from Liverpool to Douglas. The Tynwald was decorated with bunting and flew the Governor's flag from the foremast. She arrived into Douglas at 14:45hrs, signalling her arrival by the blowing of her ship's whistle, which in turn was greeted by rockets being fired from Douglas Head and the sounding of the fog horn on the Victoria Pier.

On 17 November 1937, during a storm with associated south-easterly gales, Tynwald sustained damage whilst attempting to berth at Douglas. Earlier that day, her sister Fenella had fouled a mooring rope whilst also attempting to berth at Douglas, which prior to the construction of the Princess Alexandra Pier in 1984, was a notoriously hazardous port due to its exposure during periods of strong easterly wind. Taking that morning's sailing from Liverpool to Douglas, Tynwald experienced great difficulty trying to berth at the King Edward VIII Pier, and suffered damage to the belting on her starboard side, over a distance of approximately five metres, as well as suffering damage to her plating. Finally she secured alongside and having discharged her passengers and mail, Tynwald departed for Liverpool at 15:50hrs taking the passengers and mail which should have left on Fenella's morning sailing, which had been cancelled due to her incident with the mooring rope.

== War service ==
Along with Fenella, Tynwald was requisitioned as a personnel vessel in the first week of the war. Her log was largely uneventful until with the German onslaught on Belgium and France during the spring of 1940, the plight of the British Expeditionary Force became apparent, and she was dispatched to assist with the evacuation of troops from Dunkirk.

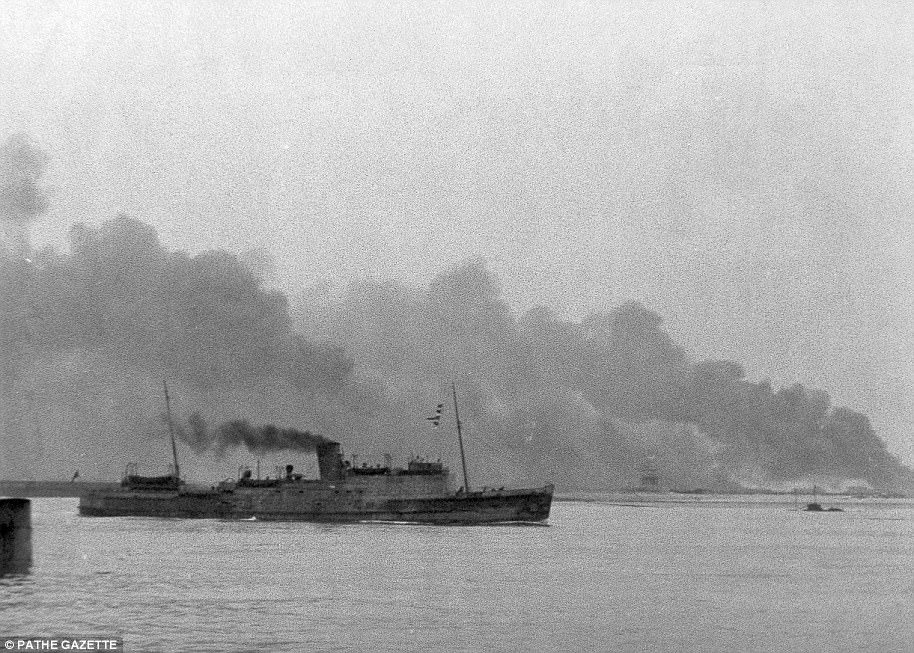
Tynwald edges past the wreck of her Steam Packet sister King Orry, as she approaches Dunkirk.

During the course of Operation Dynamo, Tynwald, initially under the command of Captain J H Whiteway, and then under Captain W A Qualtrough, had the distinction of embarking more troops that any other company vessel.

She made her first mission to the shattered port on 28 May, and was one of ten personnel ships that lifted a total of 14,760 troops from the eastern mole the following day. The same day, her sister Fenella was lost.

In the late evening of 30 May, she was one of four personnel vessels back at the mole and withdrew 1,153 troops. On 2 June, she made her third trip and embarked 1,200 troops, leaving for Dover in the early morning of 3 June.

The last day of the operation was 4 June; shortly after 14:00hrs, the Admiralty announced that Operation Dynamo was over. By then Tynwald had already left the eastern mole after her fourth trip. She was the last ship to leave, landing 3,000 French troops in England later that day. Her total in the operation is officially given as 8,953 troops.

== Royal Navy service - HMS Tynwald ==
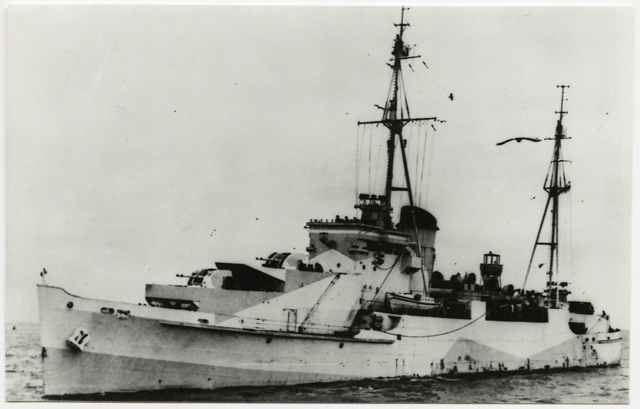
HMS Tynwald in naval service

At the end of 1940, she was compulsorily acquired, fitted out as an auxiliary anti-aircraft ship and commissioned as HMS Tynwald on 1 October 1941. Armed with 6 4-inch AA guns (3x2), and eight 2-pdr (40mm) AA guns (2x4). After a year on convoy escort duties around Britain she was assigned to Operation Torch, the Allied landing in North Africa, and was involved in the amphibious assault on Algiers on 8 November 1942.

Three days later the ship was part of a task force sent to capture an airfield near Bougie (modern Béjaïa) 100 miles east of Algiers. At the centre of the force were infantry landing craft, and the covering force included the cruiser HMS Sheffield, the monitor HMS Roberts, Tynwald and fourteen other supporting vessels. The first landing met with little or no opposition, and the Bougie harbour was occupied. However, it proved impossible to capture the airfield from the sea owing to adverse weather conditions. Instead, the attacking force that was still at sea came under heavy enemy air attack in the Battle of Béjaïa.

== Fate ==
On 12 November 1942, Tynwald was hit by a torpedo fired by the Italian submarine Argo. She had been standing by the monitor Roberts, which was on fire and badly damaged. Tynwald went down in 7 fathoms (13 m) of water, her wreck position is given as LAT:36°51'N LON:005°04'E.

Survivors were rescued by Roberts and the corvette HMS Samphire. Three officers and seven ratings were listed as casualties.
