= HMS Crested Eagle =

Thames paddle steamer, lost at Dunkirk (1925-1940)

Coordinates: 51.075920°N 2.4912°E

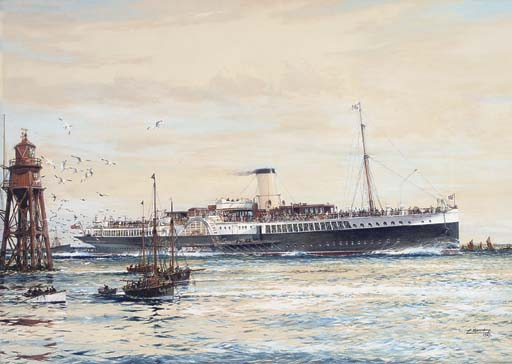

History

United Kingdom
- Name: Crested Eagle
- Owner: General Steam Navigation Co
- Operator: (United Kingdom) Royal Navy (1940)
- Port of registry: (United Kingdom) London
- Builder: J. Samuel White, East Cowes
- Launched: 25 March 1925
- Completed: June 1925
- Identification: UK official number 148598; code letters KSPT (until 1933); call sign MNFY (by 1934)
- Fate: Bombed and beached, 1940

General characteristics as built
- Type: Paddle steamer
- Tonnage: 1,110 GRT, 579 NRT
- Length: 229.7 ft (70.0 m)
- Beam: 34.6 ft (10.5 m)
- Depth: 11.1 ft (3.4 m)
- Installed power: 538 NHP
- Propulsion: triple-expansion engines

HMS Crested Eagle was a paddle steamer sunk in the Dunkirk evacuation. J. Samuel White built her in 1925 for the General Steam Navigation Company, and was requisitioned by the Admiralty during the World War II for anti-aircraft duties as part of the Thames Special Service Flotilla.

== History ==
Crested Eagle was the first oil-burning paddle steamer built for the Thames. She was designed with a three-part telescopic funnel, hinged mast and low superstructure to enable her to pass underneath London Bridge, to allow her to compete with ships such as PS Royal Sovereign. She carried passengers from Old Swan Pier (just west of London Bridge), along the Thames to Margate. In 1932 General Steam Navigation Company assigned Crested Eagle to new routes from London to Clacton-on-Sea and Felixstowe, while the newly launched PS Royal Eagle took over the old Margate route. With the outbreak of World War II, in September 1939, Crested Eagle was one of the ships tasked with evacuating children out of London, carrying them to Felixstowe.

On 29 May 1940, captained by Lieutenant Commander (Temporary) Bernard Booth RNR, Crested Eagle sailed from Sheerness to the east mole at Dunkirk. On the west side of the mole were some trawlers and HMS Grenade, with Fenella and Crested Eagle docked on the east wide. Troops were boarding the trawlers and the three ships in between bombing raids. But after Grenade and Fenella were both damaged by bombing raids, the survivors on both ships disembarked and boarded the Crested Eagle. She set sail with about 600 men aboard, but less than a mile from the mole a number of bombs hit her. With the aft of the ship on fire, including the lounges where large numbers of troops had been sheltering, the captain was advised by an engineer that the ship would not survive, so he ordered the ship beached. About 200 survivors of the Crested Eagle were picked up by other ships including HMS Albury, HMS Lydd and TSS St Seiriol. The Crested Eagle's second engineer and a stoker from HMS Grenade were rescued from the water by HMS Sabre. About 300 soldiers were killed in the incident.

The ship is still visible at low spring tide on Zuydcoote beach.

The ship's original bell, which was being repaired at the time of the sinking on 29 May 1940, was re-dedicated by Prince Michael of Kent at a ceremony in Ramsgate Harbour on 20 May 2025, and subsequently gifted to the city of Dunkirk.

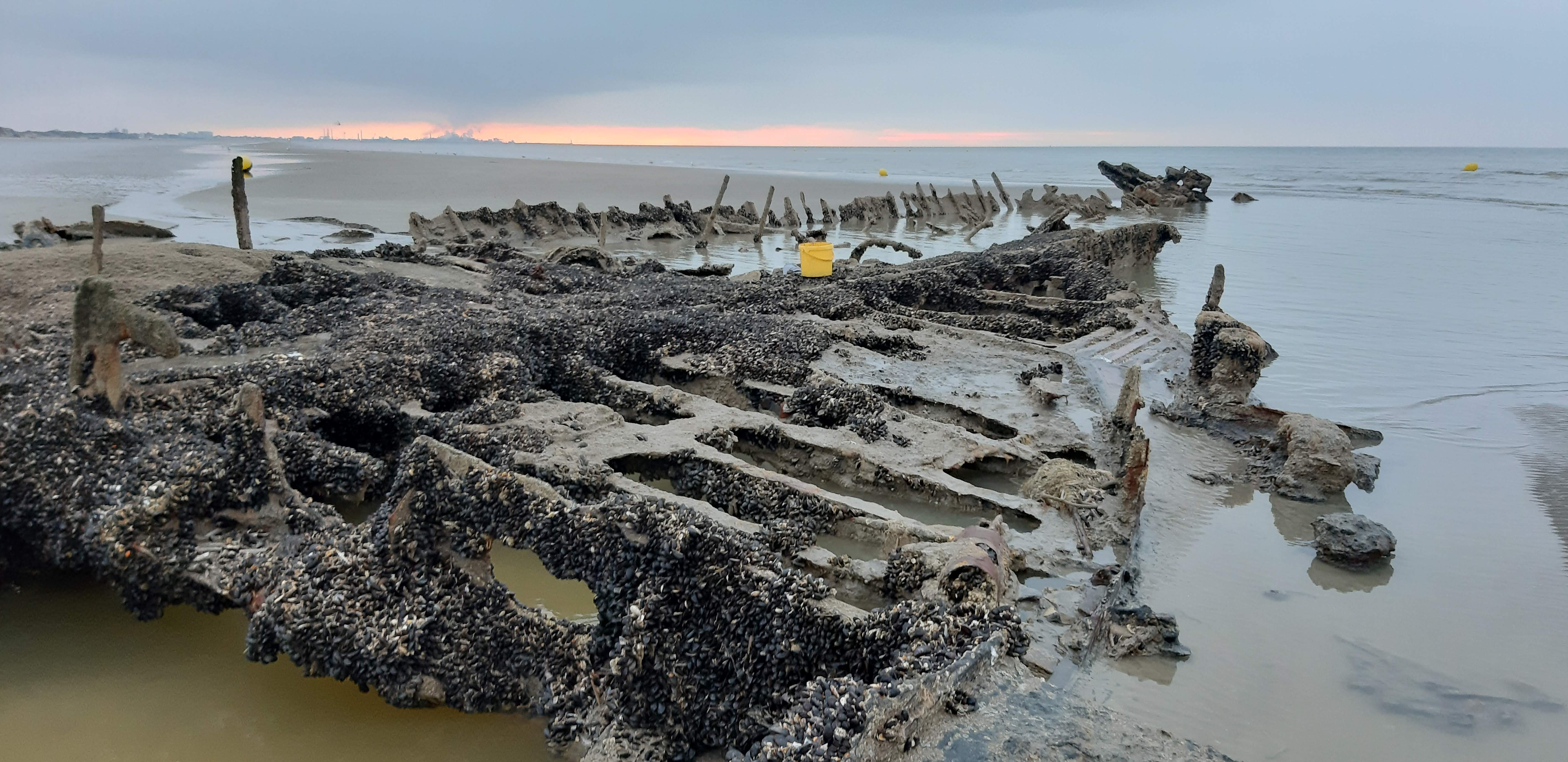

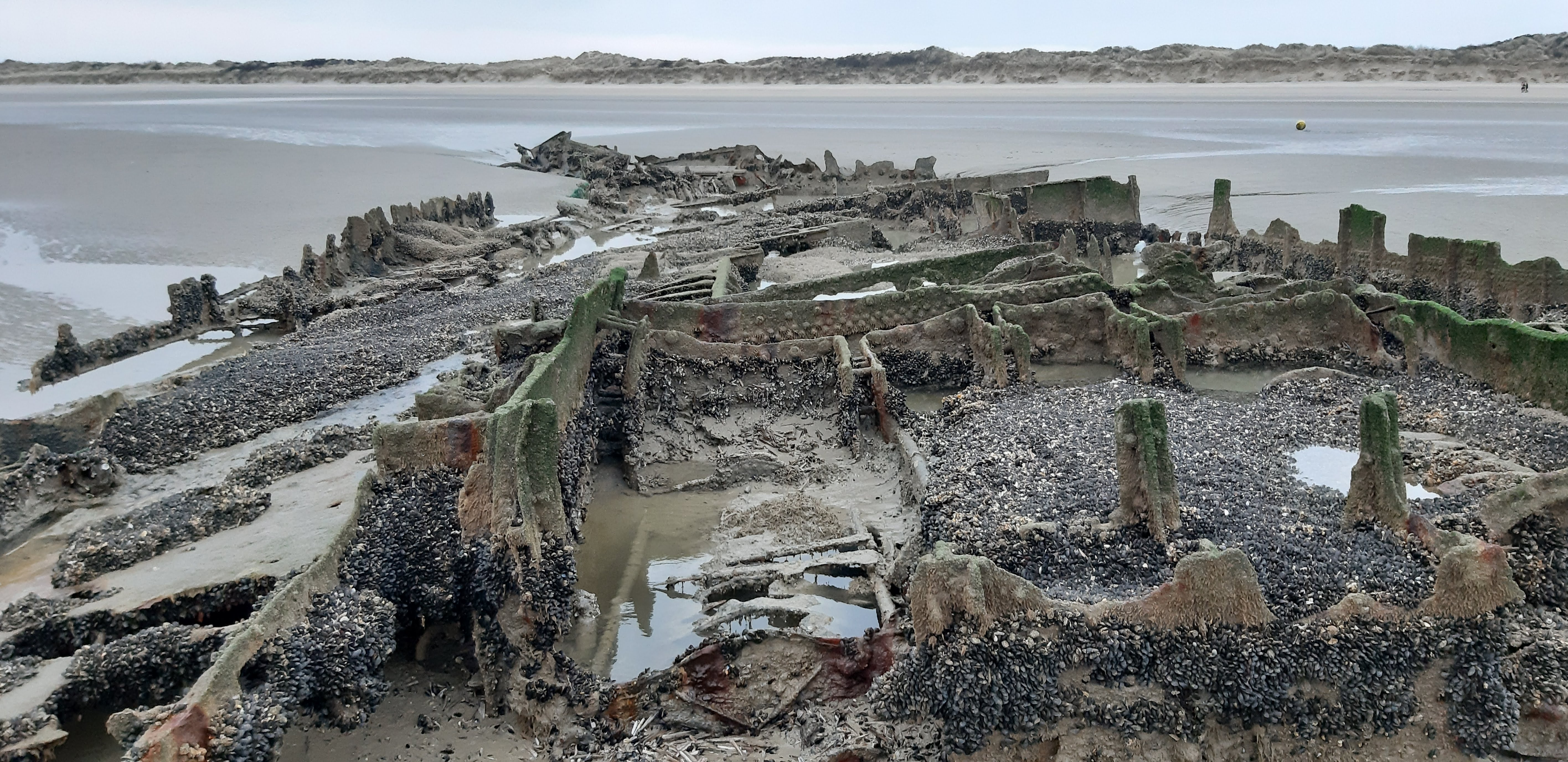

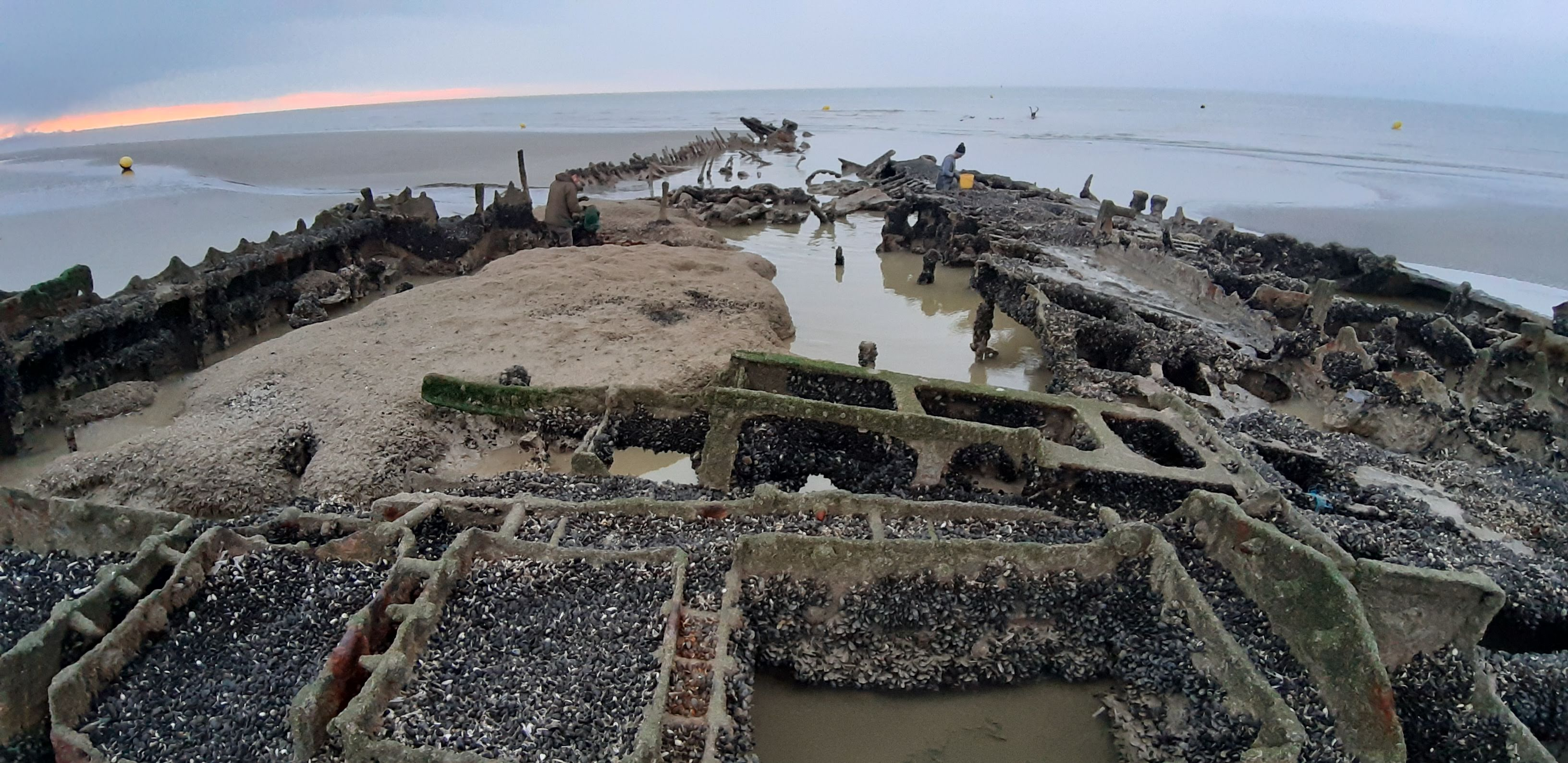
