= Port St Mary Town Hall =

Municipal building in Port St Mary, Isle of Man

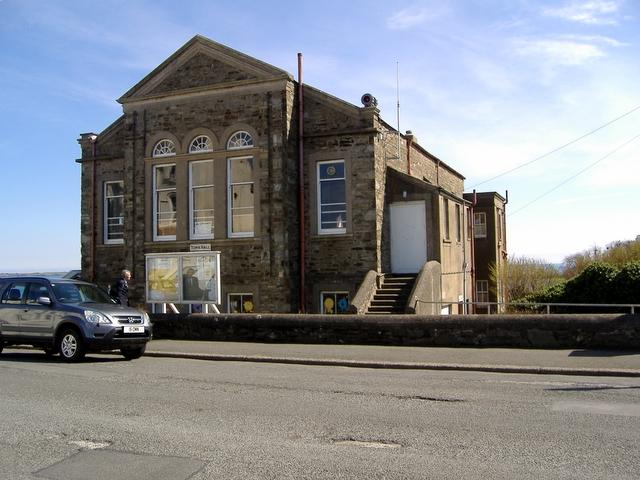
- The building in April 2006

- Shown in Isle of Man
- 54.0778°N 4.7387°W
- Location: The Promenade, Port St Mary

History
- Built: 1898

Site notes
- Architectural style: Neoclassical style

Port St Mary Town Hall is a municipal building on The Promenade, Port St Mary, Isle of Man. It accommodates the offices and meeting place of the Port St Mary Commissioners.

== History ==
Following the implementation of the Local Government Act 1886, Port St Mary became a village district with elected commissioners in 1890. In this context, a group of local businessmen formed a company, to be known as The Port St. Mary Public Hall Company Limited, to finance and commission a dedicated town hall for the village. A shipping clerk, Frank Strickland, was appointed secretary of the company.

The site they selected for the new building, on the south side of The Promenade, had been occupied by the Chapel of St Mary (Manx: Keeill Moirrey) in the early medieval period. They purchased it from a local landowner, John Sainsbury, in 1897. The building was designed in the neoclassical style, built in rubble masonry and was completed in 1898. The design involved a symmetrical main frontage of five bays facing The Promenade. The central section of three bays, which was slightly projected forward, featured three tall sash windows with round heads flanked by pairs of Doric order pilasters supporting a pediment. The outer bays were fenestrated by sash windows. There were external staircases leading up to porches on both sides of the building, and there was a prominent Venetian window with a clock above on the northeast side. Internally, the assembly hall featured a sprung maple floor suitable for dancing and roller skating.

The project was not a commercial success, and the hall was sold to the Port St Mary Commissioners, for use as their offices and meeting place, for £1,500 in November 1938. The company which had developed the building was then dissolved in September 1939. After the completion of an extensive programme of refurbishment works, the building was officially re-opened by the deemster, Percy Cowley, as Port St Mary Town Hall on 22 November 1939. The assembly hall was subsequently made available for exhibitions, pantomime performances and film shows.

In May 2023, the town hall featured an exhibition about the steamship SS Mona's Queen, which took part in the Dunkirk evacuation in May 1940. The ship was struck by a sea mine outside Dunkirk Harbour and sunk in two minutes.
