= Port St Mary =

Village on the Isle of Man

Coordinates: 54.0749°N 4.7389°W

Port St Mary: Manx: Purt le Moirrey
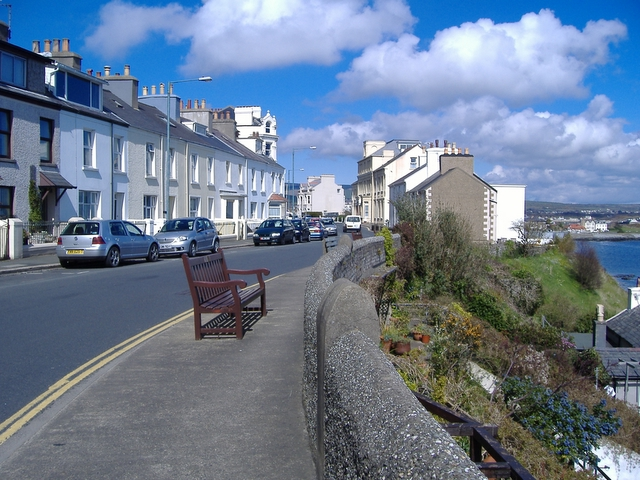
- Bay View Road in Port St. Mary

- Location within the Isle of Man
- Population: 1,957 (2011 Census)
- OS grid reference: SC209677
  - Douglas: 14 miles (23 km)
- Parish: Rushen
- Sheading: Rushen
- Crown dependency: Isle of Man
- Post town: ISLE OF MAN
- Postcode district: IM9
- Dialling code: 01624
- Police: Isle of Man
- Fire: Isle of Man
- Ambulance: Isle of Man
- House of Keys: Rushen

Port St Mary (Manx: Purt le Moirrey pronounced [poːrt lə ˈmɔrə] or Purt-noo-Moirrey pronounced [poːrt nə ˈmɔrə]) is a village district in the south-west of the Isle of Man. The village takes its name from the former Chapel of St Mary (Manx: Keeill Moirrey) which is thought to have overlooked Chapel Bay in the village. Its population is 1,953 according to the 2011 census. In the 19th century it was sometimes called Port-le-Murray.

== Etymology ==
The English version Port St Mary comes directly from the Manx version, originally purt kill Moirrey 'harbour of/by St Mary's church' most likely in reference to the former Chapel of St Mary. The vowel and lateral /l/ of kill was metathesized into le (documented as "port 'le Muire") or alternatively it could have been borrowed from French le 'the'.

== Geography and communications ==
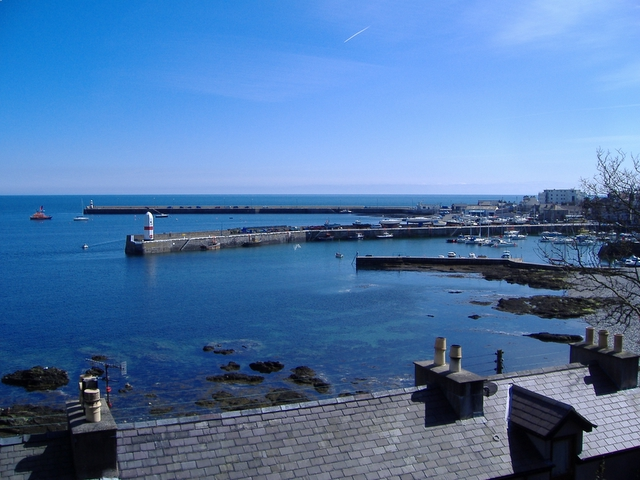
Port St Mary harbour from Bay View Road in 2006 prior to the destruction of the original Alfred Pier light.

Port St Mary is located in the south-western part of the island, near Port Erin.

A railway station is just north of the village, one of the stops on the surviving section of the Isle of Man Railway between Douglas and Port Erin. Steam trains operate on the line several times a day during the summer season, and stop at Port St Mary. The village is served by Bus Vannin services to Port Erin, Castletown, Douglas and Onchan.

== Recreation ==
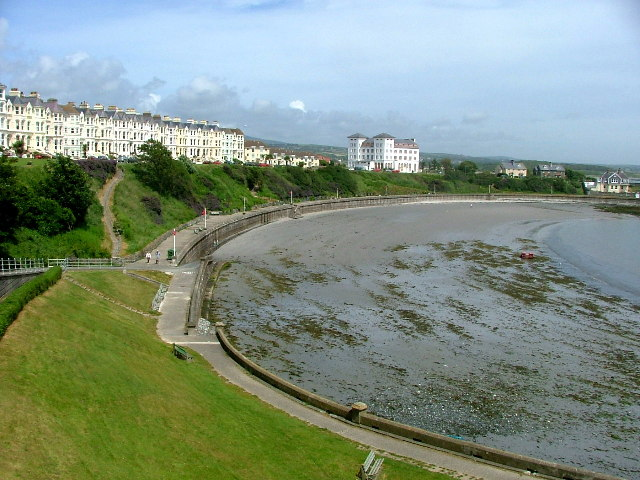
Chapel Bay

Once a fishing and trading port, the village is still popular with tourists and fishermen, especially during the summer. The inner harbour, with its pier created in 1812, is tidal and dries out from half-tide. The outer harbour was created when the Alfred Pier was built in 1882, and is accessible at all tide states — unique amongst the Manx ports. The Royal National Lifeboat Institution has a lifeboat and station in Port St Mary since 1896. The current lifeboat, the Gough Ritchie II, lies at a permanent floating mooring inside the outer breakwater.

The village is home to the Port St Mary Golf Links, the island's sole 9-hole golf course, and also Scoill Phurt le Moirrey, a primary school opened in 1993–1994. The Isle of Man Yacht Club is also based at Port St Mary harbour.

Chapel Bay, a sandy beach in the north part of the village, is used for recreation and bathing in the summer months.

== Churches and other notable buildings ==
Port St Mary Town Hall is an imposing stone building situated on the village's Victorian promenade at the north end of the village and houses local government offices and a tourist information point, as well as the hall itself, which is used for performances and community gatherings and is available for private hire. The building is thought to stand on the site of the original Keeill Moirrey.

The Anglican St Mary's Church lies in the centre of the village and is a chapel of ease dedicated to Mary of Nazareth lying in the parish of Rushen and diocese of Sodor and Man.

Just north of St Mary's is the Port St Mary site of the Living Hope Community Church (formerly known as Port St Mary Baptist Church). The current church building was built in the early 2000s on the site of the former Port St Mary Wesleyan Methodist Chapel, which was completed in 1895, closed in 1970 and was demolished in 2000.

In the south part of the village, near the port, lies the current Port St Mary Methodist Chapel, built in 1903 as a Primitive Methodist chapel and known as Mount Tabor. Another smaller former Wesleyan chapel, on the High Street, opened in 1835 and was demolished in the 1970s, with the village's garden of remembrance and war memorial occupying the site.

Port St Mary is served by St Columba's Catholic Church, which lies just outside the village and is shared with Port Erin. It is a chapel of ease in the parish of St Mary's with St Columba's in the Archdiocese of Liverpool.

There are two pubs in Port St Mary: the Albert and The Railway Station, the Bay View Hotel having closed a number of years ago. The Railway Station pub is adjacent to Port St Mary railway station on the main road to Port Erin.

A small 1860s "pepperpot" lighthouse of the end of Alfred Pier was destroyed in a storm on the night of 11/12 January 2009. It was replaced by a temporary beacon until a permanent replacement was constructed in 2018, although there is some controversy over whether it can withstand a storm.

== National Dunkirk Memorial ==
To commemorate the 70th anniversary of her sinking, the starboard anchor of Mona's Queen, an Isle of Man Steam Packet Company vessel lost off Dunkirk during Operation Dynamo on which many seamen from the Port St Mary area served, was raised on 29 May 2010 and returned to the Isle of Man to form the centerpiece of a permanent memorial. On 29 May 2012, a memorial featuring the restored anchor and commemorating the losses in 1940 of Mona's Queen, King Orry and Fenella was opened in a ceremony at Kallow Point in Port St Mary, attended by representatives of local and national government, the Lieutenant Governor, the Isle of Man Steam Packet Company and the French Navy.

== Local government ==
Port St Mary became a village district for local government purposes in 1890, for which Port St Mary Commissioners are responsible. The local government district is adjacent to the village district of Port Erin and the parish of Rushen.

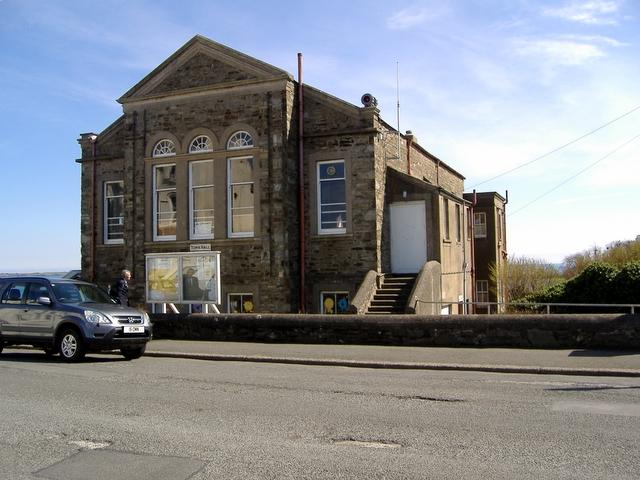
Port St Mary Town Hall

It was claimed in Tynwald on 18 July 2018 that "it appears that Port St Mary Commissioners lurch inelegantly from one crisis to another".

== Demographics ==
Port St Mary (census)
Year	1996	2001	2006	2011	2016	2021
Pop.	1,874	1,941	1,913	1,953	1,916	1,989
±%	—	+3.6%	−1.4%	+2.1%	−1.9%	+3.8%

== Famous people ==
- John Gell (1899–1983), Manx language teacher and author who lived in Port St Mary from the 1940s until his death.
- Quintin Gill (born 1959), former Member of the House of Keys for Rushen between 2001 and 2011, now resides in Port St Mary.
- Vincent Peter Patrick Karalius (1932–2008), rugby league player.
- Davy Knowles (born 1987), blues/rock guitarist and singer born in Port St Mary.
- Colonel John Dale Lace (1859–1937), South African gold and diamond mining magnate, born in Port St Mary.
- Mollie Sugden (1922–2009), actress, lived in Port St Mary for several years before returning to the United Kingdom.
- Juan Watterson SHK (born 1980), resides in Port St Mary.
