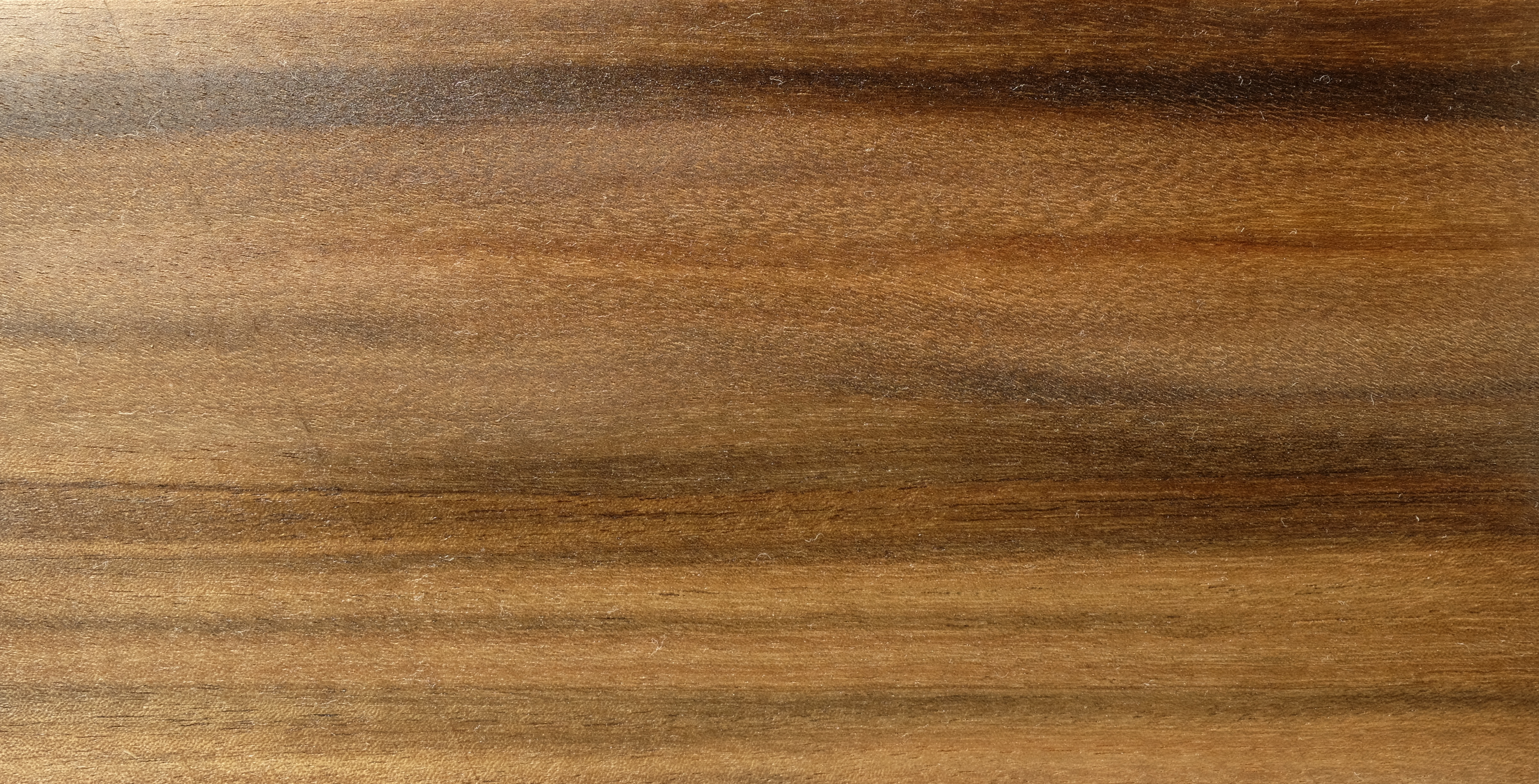
- Finished timber

Scientific classification
- Kingdom: Plantae
- Clade: Tracheophytes
- Clade: Angiosperms
- Clade: Magnoliids
- Order: Laurales
- Family: Lauraceae
- Genus: Endiandra
- Species: E. palmerstonii

Binomial name
- Endiandra palmerstonii C. T. White, 1920

= Endiandra palmerstonii =

Queensland walnut

Species of plant

Endiandra palmerstonii, popularly known as Queensland walnut or black walnut, is a rainforest tree of northern Queensland. It was named after the Australian prospector Christie Palmerston.

Queensland walnut has been used as a furniture timber. It is also used to make guitars.

The nut was an important food source for Aboriginal Australians.

It was initially classified Cryptocarya palmerstonii by Frederick Manson Bailey in 1891, and received its present classification from his grandson C. T. White in 1920.
