= Grade II* listed buildings in West Devon =

There are over 20,000 Grade II* listed buildings in England. This page is a list of these buildings in the district of West Devon in Devon.

== West Devon ==
Name	Location	Type	Completed (Note: The date given is the date used by Historic England as significant for the initial building or that of an important part in the structure's description.)	Date designated	Grid ref. (Note: The grid reference is based on the British national grid reference system, sometimes known as OSGB36, used by the Ordnance Survey.) Geo-coordinates	Entry number (Note: The "List Entry Number" is a unique number assigned to each listed building and scheduled monument by Historic England.)	Image
Church of St Mary the Virgin	Belstone, West Devon	Parish Church	15th century	22 February 1967	SX6192793500; 50°43′29″N 3°57′27″W	1106119	Church of St Mary the Virgin More images
Bere Barton	Bere Ferrers, West Devon	Dairy	19th century	21 March 1967	SX4588163400; 50°27′01″N 4°10′20″W	1326389	Upload Photo
Calstock Viaduct	Bere Ferrers, West Devon	Railway Lift	1934	26 January 1987	SX4335268637; 50°29′48″N 4°12′36″W	1105516	Calstock Viaduct More images
Bondleigh Barton	Bondleigh, West Devon	Farmhouse	Circa early 16th century	8 October 1987	SS6512404803; 50°49′37″N 3°54′59″W	1326421	Upload Photo
Bradstone Manor House	Bradstone, West Devon	Cross Passage House	possibly late 16th century	14 June 1952	SX3818380908; 50°36′19″N 4°17′17″W	1326685	Upload Photo
Chimsworthy	Bratton Clovelly, West Devon	Farmhouse	Late C16/Early 17th century	22 February 1967	SX4643193885; 50°43′27″N 4°10′37″W	1105620	Upload Photo
North Breazle Farmhouse	Bratton Clovelly, West Devon	Farmhouse	c. 1500	7 September 1987	SX4489892115; 50°42′29″N 4°11′53″W	1105624	Upload Photo
West Burrow Farmhouse	Bratton Clovelly, West Devon	Farmhouse	C20	7 September 1987	SX4908991718; 50°42′20″N 4°08′19″W	1164785	Upload Photo
Wrixhill Farmhouse	Wrixhill, Bratton Clovelly, West Devon	Farmhouse	Late 15th century	7 September 1987	SX4642890670; 50°41′43″N 4°10′33″W	1105626	Upload Photo
East Liddaton Farmhouse	Brentor, West Devon	Farmhouse	15th century or earlier	7 November 1985	SX4627982638; 50°37′23″N 4°10′28″W	1163101	Upload Photo
Church of St Bridget	Bridestowe, West Devon	Parish Church	Pre 15th century	22 February 1967	SX5135389430; 50°41′08″N 4°06′20″W	1326297	Church of St Bridget More images
Fernworthy	Fernworthy, Bridestowe, West Devon	Farmhouse	15th century	7 September 1987	SX5116187047; 50°39′50″N 4°06′26″W	1317490	Upload Photo
Great Bidlake	Bridestowe, West Devon	Manor House	Pre 16th century	20 February 1952	SX4946988652; 50°40′41″N 4°07′55″W	1326276	Great Bidlake More images
Berrator Farmhouse	Buckland Monachorum, West Devon	Farmhouse	15th century	21 March 1967	SX4773068732; 50°29′55″N 4°08′54″W	1105485	Berrator Farmhouse
Crapstone Barton, including Garden Wall and Gate Piers Immediately to West of House	Buckland Monachorum, West Devon	Farmhouse	16th century	21 March 1967	SX4908867966; 50°29′31″N 4°07′44″W	1105460	Upload Photo
Cuxton Farmhouse	Buckland Monachorum, West Devon	Farmhouse	late C16/early 17th century	21 March 1967	SX4874168261; 50°29′40″N 4°08′02″W	1326378	Upload Photo
The Infirmary, Buckland Abbey	Buckland Monachorum, West Devon	Guest House	later 15th century	26 January 1987	SX4881866789; 50°28′53″N 4°07′56″W	1318245	The Infirmary, Buckland Abbey
Tower and adjoining Outbuilding Approx. 40 Metres to North of Buckland Abbey	Buckland Monachorum, West Devon	House	Mid C20	26 January 1987	SX4872366825; 50°28′54″N 4°08′01″W	1105454	Tower and adjoining Outbuilding Approx. 40 Metres to North of Buckland Abbey More images
Uphill	Buckland Monachorum, West Devon	Farmhouse	16th century	21 March 1967	SX5021465962; 50°28′27″N 4°06′44″W	1105490	Upload Photo
Bishops House	Chagford, West Devon	House	Early 16th century	20 February 1952	SX7010587717; 50°40′28″N 3°50′23″W	1147239	Upload Photo
British Legion Hall	Chagford, West Devon	Church House	late C16-early 17th century	20 February 1952	SX7008687490; 50°40′21″N 3°50′24″W	1308676	British Legion Hall More images
Higher Horselake Farmhouse	Chagford, West Devon	Farmhouse	16th century	22 February 1967	SX7196686530; 50°39′52″N 3°48′47″W	1309061	Higher Horselake Farmhouse
Lower Jurston Farmhouse including Garden Walls to South	Chagford, West Devon	Farmhouse	Late 19th century	22 February 1967	SX6966984508; 50°38′44″N 3°50′41″W	1166337	Upload Photo
Stinhall Cottage including Garage adjoining to East	Chagford, West Devon	Farmhouse	16th century and 17th century	20 February 1952	SX7063385519; 50°39′18″N 3°49′53″W	1106200	Stinhall Cottage including Garage adjoining to East More images
The Old School House approx. 7 Metres North-west of Yeo Farmhouse	Chagford, West Devon	Kitchen	late C16-early 17th century	23 December 1986	SX6782786593; 50°39′50″N 3°52′17″W	1326036	Upload Photo
Barn approx. 3 Metres North of Yeo Farmhouse	Chagford, West Devon	Hall House	late C15-early 16th century	23 December 1986	SX6785186579; 50°39′50″N 3°52′16″W	1106169	Upload Photo
The Three Crowns Hotel	Chagford	Dower House	Late 16th century	20 February 1952	SX7006987499; 50°40′21″N 3°50′24″W	1106177	The Three Crowns Hotel More images
Westcott Cottage	Chagford, West Devon	House	Early 17th century	16 September 1987	SX7101187637; 50°40′27″N 3°49′37″W	1308806	Upload Photo
Whiddon Park Deer Park Wall between SX 723 889 and SX 722 894	Chagford, West Devon	Gate	Medieval	16 September 1987	SX7230088900; 50°41′09″N 3°48′33″W	1146823	Upload Photo
Whiddonpark House	Chagford, West Devon	House	c. 1980	20 February 1952	SX7210389243; 50°41′19″N 3°48′43″W	1308809	Upload Photo
Yellam	Chagford, West Devon	Farmhouse	Mid 17th century	22 February 1967	SX7144486999; 50°40′06″N 3°49′14″W	1106165	Yellam More images
Parish Church of St Andrew	Coryton, West Devon	Church	13th century	21 March 1967	SX4570583554; 50°37′52″N 4°10′59″W	1163271	Parish Church of St Andrew More images
Church of St Michael	Princetown, Dartmoor Forest, West Devon	Church	c1810-1814	21 March 1967	SX5868173714; 50°32′46″N 3°59′45″W	1105434	Church of St Michael More images
Clapper Bridge	Postbridge, Dartmoor Forest, West Devon	Clapper Bridge	13th century	21 March 1967	SX6482578900; 50°35′39″N 3°54′40″W	1105432	Clapper Bridge More images
Lower Merripit Farmhouse	Dartmoor Forest, West Devon	Cruck House	16th century	6 March 1955	SX6583079180; 50°35′49″N 3°53′49″W	1105416	Upload Photo
Old Pizwell Farmhouse	Lydford, Dartmoor Forest, West Devon	Cruck House	Early 16th century	28 October 1987	SX6684278447; 50°35′26″N 3°52′57″W	1305883	Upload Photo
Tor Royal	Dartmoor Forest, West Devon	House	1785-1793	21 March 1967	SX6003373141; 50°32′28″N 3°58′36″W	1305991	Tor Royal More images
Church Cottage	Drewsteignton, West Devon	Cruck House	Mid 16th century	22 February 1967	SX7360690844; 50°42′12″N 3°47′28″W	1106076	Church Cottage More images
Church Rooms	Drewsteignton, West Devon	Cruck House	Early-mid 16th century	22 February 1967	SX7363290819; 50°42′12″N 3°47′27″W	1106077	Upload Photo
Coombe Farmhouse	Drewsteignton, West Devon	Farmhouse	Late C15-early 16th century	4 March 1988	SX7197689660; 50°41′33″N 3°48′50″W	1106090	Upload Photo
Disused Farmhouse at Flood	Drewsteignton, West Devon	Farmhouse	Late C16-early 17th century	4 March 1988	SX7075393344; 50°43′31″N 3°49′57″W	1306655	Upload Photo
Drascombe Barton	Drewsteignton, West Devon	Farmhouse	Mid 17th century	22 February 1967	SX7012792007; 50°42′47″N 3°50′27″W	1169119	Upload Photo
Drewe Arms Public House	Drewsteignton, Drewsteignton, West Devon	House	C20	22 February 1967	SX7359290861; 50°42′13″N 3°47′29″W	1306339	Drewe Arms Public House More images
Fingle Bridge	Fingle Bridge, Drewsteignton, West Devon	Road Bridge	16th century	22 February 1967	SX7431089946; 50°41′44″N 3°46′52″W	1326071	Fingle Bridge More images
Hobhouse Farmhouse	Drewsteignton, West Devon	Farmhouse	Early-mid 16th century	4 March 1988	SX6978992126; 50°42′51″N 3°50′45″W	1106095	Upload Photo
Holly Cottage Lilac Cottage Pilgrim Cottage	Crockernwell, Drewsteignton, West Devon	Farmhouse	Mid-late 16th century	4 March 1988	SX7531592365; 50°43′03″N 3°46′03″W	1326097	Upload Photo
Honeyford Farmhouse	Drewsteignton, West Devon	Farmhouse	16th century	4 March 1988	SX7495791821; 50°42′45″N 3°46′21″W	1169271	Upload Photo
Lambert Farmhouse	Drewsteignton, West Devon	Farmhouse	late 15th century early 16th century	26 August 1965	SX7506492842; 50°43′18″N 3°46′17″W	1105973	Upload Photo
Middle Venton Farmhouse	Venton, Drewsteignton, West Devon	Farmhouse	Early or mid 16th century	4 March 1988	SX6949391065; 50°42′16″N 3°50′58″W	1106047	Upload Photo
Nattonhole Farmhouse	Drewsteignton, West Devon	Farmhouse	Earlier origins	4 April 1985	SX7011491718; 50°42′38″N 3°50′28″W	1169301	Upload Photo
Preston Farmhouse	Drewsteignton, West Devon	Farmhouse	Early-mid 17th century	20 February 1952	SX7497490379; 50°41′58″N 3°46′18″W	1169350	Upload Photo
Stone Farmhouse	Drewsteignton, West Devon	Farmhouse	Early-mid 16th century	4 March 1988	SX7091090847; 50°42′10″N 3°49′46″W	1169409	Upload Photo
Church of St Mary	Exbourne, West Devon	Parish Church	Early 14th century fabric	22 February 1967	SS6021601917; 50°48′00″N 3°59′06″W	1308851	Church of St Mary More images
Church of St German	Germansweek, West Devon	Parish Church	13th century	22 February 1967	SX4389694160; 50°43′34″N 4°12′47″W	1105609	Church of St German More images
Ensworthy	Gidleigh, West Devon	Farmhouse	Later alterations	16 September 1987	SX6602289496; 50°41′23″N 3°53′53″W	1326028	Upload Photo
North Forder Farmhouse	Forder, Gidleigh, West Devon	Farmhouse	late medieval	16 September 1987	SX6708589605; 50°41′27″N 3°52′59″W	1106127	North Forder Farmhouse More images
West Chapple Farmhouse	Chapple, Gidleigh, West Devon	Farmhouse	later 16th century and early 17th century	3 December 1976	SX6710889084; 50°41′10″N 3°52′57″W	1326031	Upload Photo
Deckport	Hatherleigh, West Devon	Farmhouse	Early to Mid 17th century	22 February 1967	SS5655603832; 50°48′58″N 4°02′15″W	1105269	Upload Photo
18 Market Street	Hatherleigh, West Devon	House	Earlier	22 February 1967	SS5418204535; 50°49′19″N 4°04′18″W	1326472	Upload Photo
Church of Holy Cross	Highampton, West Devon	Parish Church	12th century origins	22 February 1967	SS4895404614; 50°49′17″N 4°08′45″W	1165844	Church of Holy Cross More images
Church of St John the Baptist	Horrabridge, West Devon	Parish Church	1893	23 January 1987	SX5123869670; 50°30′28″N 4°05′58″W	1305856	Church of St John the Baptist More images
Sortridge Manor	Horrabridge, West Devon	Cross Passage House	Mid 16th century	14 June 1952	SX5062571048; 50°31′12″N 4°06′31″W	1326223	Upload Photo
Nos 1 and 2 Week Cottages including adjoining Linhay to North-west	Iddesleigh, West Devon	Farmhouse	circa early to mid 17th century	29 February 1988	SS5662206180; 50°50′14″N 4°02′15″W	1166057	Nos 1 and 2 Week Cottages including adjoining Linhay to North-west More images
Church of St Petrock	Inwardleigh, West Devon	Parish Church	Late 15th century	22 February 1967	SX5601099444; 50°46′36″N 4°02′37″W	1105205	Church of St Petrock More images
Broomford Manor including Service Yard immediately to North-west and Stable Yard immediately to North of that	Jacobstowe, West Devon	Country House	1871-73	20 February 1952	SS5775601749; 50°47′52″N 4°01′11″W	1105210	Upload Photo
Church of St James	Jacobstowe, West Devon	Parish Church	12th century origins	22 February 1967	SS5865001610; 50°47′48″N 4°00′25″W	1326489	Church of St James More images
Croft Farmhouse including Farm Building Adjoining to North	Jacobstowe, West Devon	Farmhouse	late medieval	28 May 1987	SS5699800324; 50°47′05″N 4°01′48″W	1105211	Upload Photo
Range of Farm Buildings Around Courtyard and Pump to East of Croft Farmhouse	Jacobstowe, West Devon	Trough	Late 19th century	28 May 1987	SS5701600315; 50°47′05″N 4°01′47″W	1146552	Upload Photo
Stable Block about 10 Metres North East of Kelly House	Kelly, West Devon	Stable	1740	14 June 1952	SX3948881444; 50°36′38″N 4°16′12″W	1104813	Upload Photo
Church of St Peter	Lamerton, West Devon	Parish Church	Late C14/Early 15th century	21 March 1967	SX4510577075; 50°34′22″N 4°11′20″W	1171163	Church of St Peter More images
Longhouse at SX 466 780	Lamerton, West Devon	Barn	1987	23 January 1987	SX4660078000; 50°34′54″N 4°10′05″W	1105776	Upload Photo
Venn House	Lamerton, West Devon	House	17th century	21 March 1967	SX4520076157; 50°33′53″N 4°11′14″W	1305736	Venn House More images
Walls and Gateway attached to North of Collacombe Manor	Lamerton, West Devon	Gate	Late 16th century	14 June 1952	SX4309476480; 50°34′01″N 4°13′01″W	1170965	Upload Photo
Dovecote about 10 Metres North West of the Manor Hotel	Lewtrenchard, West Devon	Dovecote	Late 19th century	7 November 1985	SX4585586095; 50°39′15″N 4°10′55″W	1105586	Upload Photo
Table Tomb about 7 Metres South East of the Porch of the Church of St Peter	Lewtrenchard, West Devon	Table Tomb	1623	7 November 1985	SX4572186099; 50°39′15″N 4°11′02″W	1326327	Table Tomb about 7 Metres South East of the Porch of the Church of St Peter
The Dower House	Lew Mill, Lewtrenchard, West Devon	House	1664	7 November 1985	SX4678886211; 50°39′19″N 4°10′08″W	1104818	Upload Photo
The Manor Hotel	Lewtrenchard, West Devon	Manor House	between 1881 and circa 1910	14 May 1952	SX4588086066; 50°39′14″N 4°10′54″W	1318032	The Manor Hotel More images
Granary with Dovecot over about 30 Metres North West of Smallacombe Farmhouse	Lifton, West Devon	Dovecote	circa early 18th century	7 November 1985	SX3714886162; 50°39′08″N 4°18′18″W	1105590	Upload Photo
Smallacombe Farmhouse	Lifton, West Devon	Farmhouse	circa late 16th century origins	14 June 1952	SX3719286161; 50°39′08″N 4°18′16″W	1317882	Upload Photo
Wall Mounting Block and 2 Pairs of Gate Piers Round Garden to the East of Smallacombe Farmhouse	Lifton, West Devon	Gate Pier	circa early 18th century	21 March 1967	SX3722486142; 50°39′08″N 4°18′14″W	1164213	Upload Photo
Church of St Petrock	Lydford, West Devon	Parish Church	13th century	21 March 1967	SX5090884739; 50°38′36″N 4°06′36″W	1326399	Church of St Petrock More images
Wringworthy Farmhouse	Mary Tavy, West Devon	Farmhouse	Early 16th century	14 June 1952	SX5002577246; 50°34′32″N 4°07′10″W	1326254	Upload Photo
Coach House and Stables to the North West of Sydenham House	Sydenham, Marystow, West Devon	Apartment	circa mid 17th century	21 March 1967	SX4278983895; 50°38′01″N 4°13′28″W	1317598	Upload Photo
Yew Tree Cottage	Dippertown, Marystow, West Devon	House	16th century	7 November 1985	SX4286384654; 50°38′25″N 4°13′25″W	1164642	Upload Photo
Meavy Barton	Meavy, West Devon	Farmhouse	Early 16th century	26 January 1987	SX5398667234; 50°29′12″N 4°03′35″W	1105445	Upload Photo
Church of St Michael	Meeth, West Devon	Parish Church	Norman	22 February 1967	SS5480508283; 50°51′21″N 4°03′51″W	1308852	Church of St Michael More images
Woolladon Farmhouse	Meeth, West Devon	Farmhouse	1666	29 February 1988	SS5267107589; 50°50′56″N 4°05′39″W	1326490	Upload Photo
Edgcumbe	Milton Abbot, West Devon	Farmhouse	1967	21 March 1967	SX3981679186; 50°35′25″N 4°15′52″W	1105539	Upload Photo
Forda House	Milton Abbot, West Devon	Farmhouse	medieval origins	7 November 1985	SX4352182147; 50°37′05″N 4°12′48″W	1326342	Upload Photo
Leigh Barton	Milton Abbot, West Devon	Farmhouse	Early 16th century	21 March 1967	SX3952777315; 50°34′25″N 4°16′03″W	1105543	Upload Photo
Retaining Wall on the Terrace to the Terrace to the South East of Endsleigh House	Endsleigh, Milton Abbot, West Devon	Wall	c. 1810	7 November 1985	SX3916178595; 50°35′06″N 4°16′24″W	1165098	Retaining Wall on the Terrace to the Terrace to the South East of Endsleigh House More images
Sundial in the Garden to the South of Endsleigh House	Endsleigh, Milton Abbot, West Devon	Sundial	circa early 19th century	7 November 1985	SX3910478578; 50°35′05″N 4°16′27″W	1105546	Upload Photo
The Dairy Dell Cottage	Endsleigh, Milton Abbot, West Devon	House	c. 1814	7 November 1985	SX3892978634; 50°35′07″N 4°16′36″W	1317408	The Dairy Dell Cottage More images
East Lake Farmhouse	Monkokehampton, West Devon	Farmhouse	early to mid 17th century	29 February 1988	SS5884906121; 50°50′14″N 4°00′21″W	1105186	Upload Photo
Cottles Barton	North Tawton, West Devon	House	1952	20 February 1952	SS6606500492; 50°47′19″N 3°54′05″W	1326410	Upload Photo
Former Church of St Martin	North Tawton, West Devon	Church	Late 13th century	22 February 1967	SS7023400942; 50°47′37″N 3°50′33″W	1105369	Former Church of St Martin More images
Greenslade Farmhouse	North Tawton, West Devon	Farmhouse	Probable medieval core	22 February 1967	SS6493700262; 50°47′10″N 3°55′03″W	1105370	Upload Photo
Upcott Farmhouse	North Tawton, West Devon	Farmhouse	Circa late 15th century	8 October 1987	SS6998902610; 50°48′30″N 3°50′48″W	1326434	Upload Photo
Well immediately to West of Westacott Barton	North Tawton, West Devon	Well Head	Probably 17th century	8 October 1987	SS6846602250; 50°48′17″N 3°52′05″W	1105337	Upload Photo
Westacott Barton	North Tawton, West Devon	Farmhouse	Late 15th century or early 16th century	22 February 1967	SS6849002244; 50°48′17″N 3°52′04″W	1326435	Upload Photo
Church of St Mary	Ashbury, Northlew, West Devon	Parish Church	Late C16/Early 17th century	22 February 1967	SX5078897959; 50°45′43″N 4°07′01″W	1326285	Church of St Mary More images
Chapel of St James	Okehampton, West Devon	Chapel	15th century	5 February 1952	SX5884995214; 50°44′22″N 4°00′06″W	1105858	Chapel of St James More images
Oaklands	Okehampton, West Devon	Country House	c. 1820	5 February 1952	SX5884695845; 50°44′42″N 4°00′07″W	1326189	Oaklands
Town Hall	Okehampton, West Devon	House	1685	5 February 1952	SX5873195200; 50°44′21″N 4°00′12″W	1105855	Town Hall More images
Church House	Sampford Courtenay, West Devon	Cruck House	Early 16th century	8 October 1987	SS6321001230; 50°47′40″N 3°56′32″W	1105293	Church House More images
Lower (or Great) Cliston	Sampford Courtenay, West Devon	Farmhouse	Early 16th century	8 October 1987	SS6181601844; 50°47′59″N 3°57′44″W	1105319	Upload Photo
Slade Farmhouse	Honeychurch, Sampford Courtenay, West Devon	Farmhouse	Circa mid 15th century	8 October 1987	SS6279002865; 50°48′33″N 3°56′56″W	1326486	Slade Farmhouse
South Town	Sampford Courtenay, Sampford Courtenay, West Devon	Farmhouse	Mid 17th century	8 October 1987	SS6331000839; 50°47′27″N 3°56′26″W	1326452	Upload Photo
Sampford Manor and Attached Barn and Front Wall	Sampford Spiney, Sampford Spiney, West Devon	Farmhouse	Early 16th century	21 March 1967	SX5330072469; 50°32′01″N 4°04′17″W	1105727	Sampford Manor and Attached Barn and Front Wall
Warne's Kitchen	Sampford Spiney, West Devon	Cow House	Early 16th century	21 March 1967	SX5363072795; 50°32′12″N 4°04′01″W	1105760	Upload Photo
Whimington Farmhouse	Sampford Spiney, West Devon	Farmhouse	Early 16th century	21 March 1967	SX5233771457; 50°31′27″N 4°05′04″W	1171956	Upload Photo
Yeo Old Farmhouse	Sheepstor, West Devon	Farmhouse	1610	28 October 1987	SX5511066951; 50°29′04″N 4°02′37″W	1105410	Upload Photo
Church of St Thomas of Canterbury	Sourton, West Devon	Parish Church	14th century	22 February 1967	SX5358790295; 50°41′38″N 4°04′28″W	1325962	Church of St Thomas of Canterbury More images
Black Street House	South Tawton, West Devon	Farmhouse	Early-mid 16th century	22 February 1967	SX6558194485; 50°44′04″N 3°54′22″W	1106034	Upload Photo
Bowling Green Pavilion approx. 100 Metres South of Wood House	South Tawton, West Devon	Bowling Green Pavilion	1899-1905	4 March 1988	SX6545495955; 50°44′51″N 3°54′31″W	1106028	Upload Photo
Bridge approx. 130 Metres South East of Wood House	South Tawton, West Devon	Bridge	1899-1905	4 March 1988	SX6564795907; 50°44′50″N 3°54′21″W	1305935	Upload Photo
Chapel of St Mary including Boundary Walls adjoining to North West	South Zeal, South Tawton, West Devon	Gate	19th century	22 February 1967	SX6508093580; 50°43′34″N 3°54′47″W	1326105	Chapel of St Mary including Boundary Walls adjoining to North West More images
Church House	South Tawton, West Devon	Cruck House	Late C15-early 16th century	22 February 1967	SX6528894447; 50°44′02″N 3°54′37″W	1106005	Church House More images
Front Garden Walls and Gateway adjoining East of West Week Farmhouse	South Tawton, West Devon	Gate	1656	22 February 1967	SX6570292606; 50°43′03″N 3°54′14″W	1306024	Upload Photo
Gate Posts adjoining North West of Wood House Woodsheds	South Tawton, West Devon	Gate	1899-1905	4 March 1988	SX6547396029; 50°44′54″N 3°54′30″W	1106025	Upload Photo
Gate Posts and Gate approx. 140 Metres South East of Wood House	South Tawton, West Devon	Gate	1899-1905	4 March 1988	SX6573095886; 50°44′49″N 3°54′16″W	1106029	Upload Photo
Hendicott Farmhouse	South Tawton, West Devon	Farmhouse	Late C15-early 16th century	4 March 1988	SX6834698640; 50°46′20″N 3°52′07″W	1170257	Upload Photo
Lower Sessland Farmhouse including Cob Walls adjoining to North West and South West	South Tawton, West Devon	Farmhouse	Early 16th century	22 February 1967	SX6783497549; 50°45′45″N 3°52′31″W	1170877	Upload Photo
Mill House	South Zeal, South Tawton, West Devon	House	Late 19th century	4 March 1988	SX6514093533; 50°43′33″N 3°54′43″W	1326106	Upload Photo
Moorside	South Zeal, South Tawton, West Devon	House	Early-mid 17th century	4 March 1988	SX6512893537; 50°43′33″N 3°54′44″W	1305676	Upload Photo
Powlesland Farmhouse	South Tawton, West Devon	Farmhouse	Mid 16th century	4 March 1988	SX6886296016; 50°44′56″N 3°51′37″W	1106059	Upload Photo
Steps and Terrace Walls around Tennis Lawn South West of Wood House	South Tawton, West Devon	Wall	1899-1905	4 March 1988	SX6545096020; 50°44′53″N 3°54′31″W	1106027	Upload Photo
Summerhouse approx. 120 Metres South West of Wood House	South Tawton, West Devon	Gate	1899-1905	4 March 1988	SX6533895949; 50°44′51″N 3°54′36″W	1326114	Upload Photo
Summerhouse approx. 250 Metres South East of Wood House	South Tawton, West Devon	Summerhouse	1899-1905	4 March 1988	SX6567295791; 50°44′46″N 3°54′19″W	1106030	Upload Photo
Sundial approx. 110 Metres South of Wood House	South Tawton, West Devon	Sundial	1899-1905	4 March 1988	SX6545995912; 50°44′50″N 3°54′30″W	1170704	Upload Photo
Terrace Walls, Gazebos, Steps, Pond and Statue adjoining South-east of Wood House	South Tawton, West Devon	Gate	1899-1905	4 March 1988	SX6553695968; 50°44′52″N 3°54′26″W	1106024	Upload Photo
The Oxenham Arms	South Zeal, South Tawton, West Devon	Courtyard House	Late C16-early 17th century or earlier	20 February 1952	SX6510293539; 50°43′33″N 3°54′45″W	1305729	The Oxenham Arms More images
Village Cross	South Zeal, South Tawton, West Devon	Village Cross	15th century	22 February 1967	SX6505793594; 50°43′35″N 3°54′48″W	1106010	Village Cross More images
Walls and Summerhouse of Wood House North Garden	South Tawton, West Devon	Gate	1899-1905	4 March 1988	SX6546096041; 50°44′54″N 3°54′30″W	1170691	Upload Photo
Well Farmhouse	South Tawton, West Devon	Farmhouse	Mid or late 16th century or later	22 February 1967	SX6843190771; 50°42′06″N 3°51′52″W	1170518	Upload Photo
West Week Farmhouse	South Tawton, West Devon	Farmhouse	Early 16th century	20 February 1952	SX6566692598; 50°43′03″N 3°54′15″W	1106061	Upload Photo
Wickington Farmhouse	South Tawton, West Devon	Farmhouse	15th century	20 February 1952	SX6569296705; 50°45′16″N 3°54′19″W	1106017	Upload Photo
Wood House	South Tawton, West Devon	House	1899-1905	28 January 1987	SX6548496031; 50°44′54″N 3°54′29″W	1106023	Upload Photo
Combe Farmhouse	Spreyton, West Devon	Farmhouse	Early-mid 17th century	4 March 1988	SX6944997902; 50°45′58″N 3°51′09″W	1171794	Upload Photo
The Barton including Service Rooms adjoining to the North	Spreyton, West Devon	Farmhouse	16th century	22 February 1967	SX6971196740; 50°45′20″N 3°50′54″W	1171977	Upload Photo
Finch Foundry & Foundry House	Sticklepath, West Devon	Foundry and House	Possibly late 18th century	8 October 1987	SX6418794084; 50°43′50″N 3°55′33″W	1105302	Finch Foundry & Foundry House More images
Hayne	Stowford, West Devon	House	c. 1810	14 June 1952	SX4219086680; 50°39′30″N 4°14′03″W	1326336	Hayne More images
Stone in Churchyard about 3 Metres North of the East Churchyard Gate	Stowford, West Devon	Inscribed Stone	probably C7	7 November 1985	SX4328687005; 50°39′42″N 4°13′07″W	1105497	Upload Photo
Church of St Mary	Sydenham Damerel, West Devon	Parish Church	15th century	7 November 1985	SX4094176002; 50°33′43″N 4°14′50″W	1165836	Church of St Mary More images
Church of Our Lady and St Mary Magdalene	Tavistock, West Devon	Roman Catholic Church	1865	7 September 1951	SX4746873929; 50°32′43″N 4°09′15″W	1105836	Church of Our Lady and St Mary Magdalene More images
Guildhall, Police Station, attached Railings and Boundary Walls	Tavistock, West Devon	Guildhall	1848	7 September 1951	SX4822474409; 50°32′59″N 4°08′37″W	1309358	Guildhall, Police Station, attached Railings and Boundary Walls More images
Range of Farm Buildings in planned Farmyard including Threshing Barn with Waterwheel and Granary and Cow House with Dung Pit, etc	Tavistock, West Devon	House	1851	23 January 1987	SX4826676994; 50°34′23″N 4°08′39″W	1172309	Upload Photo
Barn, Calf House and Linhay approx. 2 Metres South of Higher Shilstone Farmhouse	Throwleigh, West Devon	Barn	17th century	20 July 1974	SX6602990123; 50°41′43″N 3°53′54″W	1106135	Upload Photo
Chagford Bridge	Throwleigh, West Devon	Road Bridge	16th century or 17th century	22 February 1967	SX6936787952; 50°40′35″N 3°51′01″W	1106212	Chagford Bridge More images
Church House	Throwleigh, West Devon	House	late C16-early 17th century	22 February 1967	SX6679890780; 50°42′05″N 3°53′15″W	1168267	Church House More images
Clannaborough Farmhouse including Garden Walls	Throwleigh, West Devon	Farmhouse	Late 19th century	22 February 1967	SX6612591209; 50°42′18″N 3°53′50″W	1106134	Clannaborough Farmhouse including Garden Walls
Throwleigh Barton	Throwleigh, West Devon	House	late 16th century and 17th century	16 June 1987	SX6688890784; 50°42′05″N 3°53′11″W	1326043	Throwleigh Barton More images
Waye Cottage including Garden Boundary Walls to South	Throwleigh, West Devon	Farmhouse	late 16th century - early 17th century	22 February 1967	SX6891289927; 50°41′39″N 3°51′26″W	1168105	Upload Photo
Wonson Manor	Wonson, Throwleigh, West Devon	Manor House	17th century or 18th century	22 February 1967	SX6745689693; 50°41′30″N 3°52′40″W	1326044	Wonson Manor
Church House Cottages	Walkhampton, West Devon	House	1987	14 June 1952	SX5371070177; 50°30′47″N 4°03′53″W	1105374	Church House Cottages More images
Huckworthy Bridge	Walkhampton, West Devon	Bridge	Late 15th century or Early 16th century	14 June 1952	SX5314370533; 50°30′58″N 4°04′22″W	1171550	Huckworthy Bridge More images
Welltown Farmhouse	Walkhampton, West Devon	Farmhouse	c. 1500	14 June 1952	SX5410170050; 50°30′43″N 4°03′33″W	1171620	Upload Photo
Barn attached to North West of Walreddon Manor	Whitchurch, West Devon	Threshing Barn	Early 17th century	21 March 1967	SX4773471328; 50°31′19″N 4°08′58″W	1326274	Upload Photo
Stable and attached Cart Shed about 5m South East of Walreddon Manor	Whitchurch, West Devon	Cart Shed	Late C18/Early 19th century	21 March 1967	SX4777371295; 50°31′18″N 4°08′56″W	1105715	Upload Photo
Wall with Gateway and attached Cottage attached to South West of Walreddon Manor	Whitchurch, West Devon	House	C20	23 January 1987	SX4774271293; 50°31′18″N 4°08′57″W	1152118	Upload Photo
Walls and Pair of Gate-piers attached to North East of Walreddon Manor	Whitchurch, West Devon	Gate Pier	Probably Early 17th century	21 March 1967	SX4778971323; 50°31′19″N 4°08′55″W	1304908	Upload Photo
