= List of churches in West Devon =

The following is a list of churches in West Devon.

== Active churches ==
The district has an estimated 99 active churches for 54,600 people, a ratio of one church to every 552 inhabitants.

The only civil parishes without active churches are Bradstone, Okehampton Hamlets and Whitchurch.

Name	Civil parish (settlement)	Web	Dedication	Founded	Denomination	Benefice	Notes
St Alban, Beaworthy	Beaworthy		Alban		Church of England	Ashwater etc.	
Madworthy Methodist Church	Beaworthy (Madworthy)				Methodist	West Devon Circuit	
St Mary, Belstone	Belstone		Mary	Medieval	Church of England	Northmoor Team	
St Andrew, Bere Ferrers	Bere Ferrers		Andrew	Medieval	Church of England	Bere Ferrers & Bere Alston	
Holy Trinity, Bere Alston	Bere Ferrers (Bere Alston)		Trinity	1848	Church of England	Bere Ferrers & Bere Alston	Previous medieval chapel defunct c. 1700
Bere Alston United Church	Bere Ferrers (Bere Alston)				Methodist / URC	Tavistock Circuit	
St James the Apostle, Bondleigh	Bondleigh		James		Church of England	Whiddon MC	
St Mary the Virgin, Bratton Clovelly	Bratton Clovelly		Mary	Medieval	Church of England	Northmoor Team	
Boasley Methodist Church	Bratton Clovelly (Boasley Cross)				Methodist	West Devon Circuit	
St Michael de Rupe, Brentor	Brentor		Michael		Church of England	Tavistock, Gulworthy, Brent Tor	Name means 'Michael on the Rock'
Christchurch, North Brentor	Brentor		Jesus	1825	Church of England	Tavistock, Gulworthy, Brent Tor	Rebuilt 1856-1857
St Bridget, Bridestowe	Bridestowe		Brigid of Kildare	Medieval	Church of England	Northmoor Team	
Bridestowe Methodist Church	Bridestowe				Methodist	West Devon Circuit	
All Hallows, Broadwoodkelly	Broadwoodkelly		All Saints	Medieval	Church of England	Ashreigney, Winkleigh etc.	
Broadwoodkelly Methodist Church	Broadwoodkelly				Methodist	West Devon Circuit	
St Andrew, Buckland Monachorum	Buckland Monachorum		Andrew	Medieval	Church of England	Buckland & Milton	
Holy Spirit, Milton Combe	Buckland Mon (Milton Combe)		Holy Spirit	1878	Church of England	Buckland & Milton	
St Paul, Yelverton	Buckland Mon (Yelverton)		Paul	1895	Church of England	West Dartmoor M Community	Current building 1909
Holy Cross, Yelverton	Buckland Mon (Yelverton)		Cross	1923	Roman Catholic		
The Rock Methodist Church, Yelverton	Buckland Mon (Yelverton)				Methodist	Tavistock Circuit	
St Michael the Archangel, Chagford	Chagford		Michael	Medieval	Church of England	Whiddon MC	
Holy Family, Chagford	Chagford		Cross		Roman Catholic		
Chagford Gospel Church	Chagford				Independent		
St Andrew, Coryton	Coryton		Andrew		Church of England	Milton Abbot etc.	
St Raphael, Huccaby	Dartmoor Forest (Huccaby)		Raphael	1868	Church of England	Ashburton Moorland Mission Comm.	Unique dedication. Daughter church of Holne church in South Hams
St Gabriel, Postbridge	Dartmoor Forest (Postbridge)		Gabriel		Church of England	Ashburton Moorland Mission Comm.	
Princetown United Church	Dartmoor Forest (Princetown)		Michael & Angels	1810-1814	CoE / Methodist	West Dartmoor MC / Tavistock Ct	St Michael & All Angels abandoned (CCT). Services in Meth chapel
Holy Trinity, Drewsteignton	Drewsteignton		Trinity		Church of England	Whiddon MC	
Crockernwell Methodist Church	Drewsteignton (Crockernwell)				Methodist	Exeter, Coast & Country	
Whiddon Down Methodist Church	Drewsteignton (Whiddon Down)				Methodist	Exeter, Coast & Country	
All Saints, Dunterton	Dunterton		All Saints		Church of England	Milton Abbot etc.	
St Mary Blessed Virgin, Exbourne	Exbourne		Mary		Church of England	Northmoor Team	
Exbourne Methodist Church	Exbourne				Methodist	West Devon Circuit	
St Germanus, Germansweek	Germansweek		Germanus of Auxerre	Medieval	Church of England	Northmoor Team	
Eworthy Methodist Church	Germansweek (Eworthy)				Methodist	West Devon Circuit	
Holy Trinity, Gidleigh	Gidleigh		Trinity	Medieval	Church of England	Whiddon MC	
St Paul, Gulworthy	Gulworthy		Paul	1856	Church of England	Tavistock, Gulworthy, Brent Tor	Built by Francis Russell, 7th Duke of Bedford
St John the Baptist, Hatherleigh	Hatherleigh		John the Baptist		Church of England	Northmoor Team	
Hatherleigh Methodist Church	Hatherleigh				Methodist	West Devon Circuit	
Hatherleigh Community Church	Hatherleigh				Independent		
Holy Cross, Highampton	Highampton		Cross		Church of England	Black Torrington Benefice	
St John the Baptist, Horrabridge	Horrabridge		John the Baptist	Medieval	Church of England	West Dartmoor M Community	New building 1893 replaced medieval chapel. United with Methodists
St James, Iddlesleigh	Iddlesleigh		James		Church of England	Dolton etc.	
Iddlesleigh Methodist Church	Iddlesleigh				Methodist	West Devon Circuit	
St Petroc, Inwardleigh	Inwardleigh		Petroc	Medieval	Church of England	Northmoor Team	
Oak Baptist Chapel	Inwardleigh (Oak Cross)				Baptist Union		
St James, Jacobstowe	Jacobstowe		James		Church of England	Northmoor Team	
St Mary the Virgin, Kelly	Kelly		Mary		Church of England	Lifton etc.	Also serves parish of Bradstone
St Peter, Lamerton	Lamerton		Peter		Church of England	Milton Abbot etc.	
St Peter, Lew Trenchard	Lewtrenchard		Peter		Church of England	Lifton etc.	
St Mary, Lifton	Lifton		Mary		Church of England	Lifton etc.	
Lifton Methodist Church	Lifton				Methodist	Launceston Area Circuit	
St Petroc, Lydford	Lydford		Petroc	Medieval	Church of England	Northmoor Team	
St Mary, Mary Tavy	Mary Tavy		Mary	Medieval	Church of England	Tavys	
Mary Tavy Methodist Church	Mary Tavy				Methodist	Tavistock Circuit	
St Mary the Virgin, Marystow	Marystow		Mary		Church of England	Milton Abbot etc.	
St Peter, Meavy	Meavy		Peter	Medieval	Church of England	West Dartmoor M Community	
St Michael & All Angels, Meeth	Meeth		Michael & Angels		Church of England	Northmoor Team	
St Constantine, Milton Abbot	Milton Abbot		Constantine (Brit)		Church of England	Milton Abbot etc.	
All Saints, Monkokehampton	Monkokehampton		All Saints		Church of England	Dolton etc.	
St Peter, North Tawton	North Tawton		Peter		Church of England	Whiddon MC	
Lakeway United Church	North Tawton				Methodist / URC	West Devon Circuit	
St Thomas of Canterbury, Northlew	Northlew		Thomas Becket	Medieval	Church of England	Northmoor Team	
Northlew Methodist Church	Northlew				Methodist	West Devon Circuit	
All Saints, Okehampton	Okehampton		All Saints	Medieval	Church of England	Northmoor Team	
St James' Chapel, Okehampton	Okehampton		James		Church of England	Northmoor Team	
St Boniface, Okehampton	Okehampton		Boniface	1905	Roman Catholic		
Okehampton Baptist Church	Okehampton				Baptist Union		
Fairplace Church, Okehampton	Okehampton				Methodist / URC	West Devon Circuit	Not found in URC directory
New Life Church Okehampton	Okehampton			1982	Assemblies of God		
St Peter, Peter Tavy	Peter Tavy		Peter		Church of England	Tavys	
Peter Tavy Methodist Church	Peter Tavy				Methodist	Tavistock Circuit	
St Andrew, Sampford Courtenay	Sampford Courtenay		Andrew	Medieval	Church of England	Whiddon MC	
St Mary, Honeychurch	Sampford Cour (Honeychurch)		Mary		Church of England	Whiddon MC	
St Mary, Sampford Spiney	Sampford Spiney		Mary	Medieval	Church of England	West Dartmoor M Community	
St Leonard, Sheepstor	Sheepstor		Leonard of Noblac	Medieval	Church of England	West Dartmoor M Community	
St Thomas a Becket, Sourton	Sourton		Thomas Becket	Medieval	Church of England	Northmoor Team	
St Andrew, South Tawton	South Tawton		Andrew	Medieval	Church of England	Whiddon MC	
St Mary, South Zeal	South Tawton (South Zeal)		Mary	Medieval	Church of England	Whiddon MC	
South Zeal Methodist Church	South Tawton (South Zeal)				Methodist	West Devon Circuit	
St Michael, Spreyton	Spreyton		Michael	Medieval	Church of England	Whiddon MC	
Spreyton Methodist Church	Spreyton				Methodist	West Devon Circuit	
St Mary, Sticklepath	Sticklepath		Mary	Medieval	Church of England	Northmoor Team	Rebuilt 1875
Sticklepath Community Church	Sticklepath				Partnership UK		
St John, Stowford	Stowford		John the Baptist		Church of England	Lifton etc.	
St Mary, Sydenham Damerel	Sydenham Damerel		Mary		Church of England	Milton Abbot etc.	
St Eustachius, Tavistock	Tavistock		Eustace	Medieval	Church of England	Tavistock, Gulworthy, Brent Tor	
St Andrew, Whitchurch	Tavistock (Whitchurch)		Andrew	Medieval	Church of England		No longer in Whitchurch civil parish
Our Lady of the Assumption, Tavistock	Tavistock		Mary	1906	Roman Catholic		1952 moved into defunct St Mary Magdalene's (Anglican)
Tavistock Methodist Church	Tavistock				Methodist	Tavistock Circuit	
Tavistock United Reformed Church	Tavistock			C17th	URC		
Tavistock Salvation Army	Tavistock				Salvation Army		
Abbey Chapel	Tavistock			C19th	Independent		
King's Church Tavistock	Tavistock			1970s	Independent		
St Mary the Virgin, Throwleigh	Throwleigh		Mary		Church of England	Whiddon MC	
Providence Methodist Church	Throwleigh (Wonson)				Methodist	West Devon Circuit	
St George, Thrushelton	Thrushelton		George		Church of England	Lifton etc.	
Broadley Methodist Church	Thrushelton				Methodist	West Devon Circuit	
St Mary the Virgin, Walkhampton	Walkhampton		Mary	Medieval	Church of England	West Dartmoor M Community	

== Defunct churches ==
Name	Civil parish	Dedication	Founded	Redundant	Denomination	Notes
St Nonna, Bradstone	Bradstone	Non	Medieval		Church of England	Churches Conservation Trust (1996)
St Mary Magdalene, Tavistock	Tavistock	Mary Magdalene	1865-1867	1948	Church of England	Building now used by Catholics
