= Whiteworks =

Former mining hamlet in Devon, England

Coordinates: 50.523°N 03.957°W

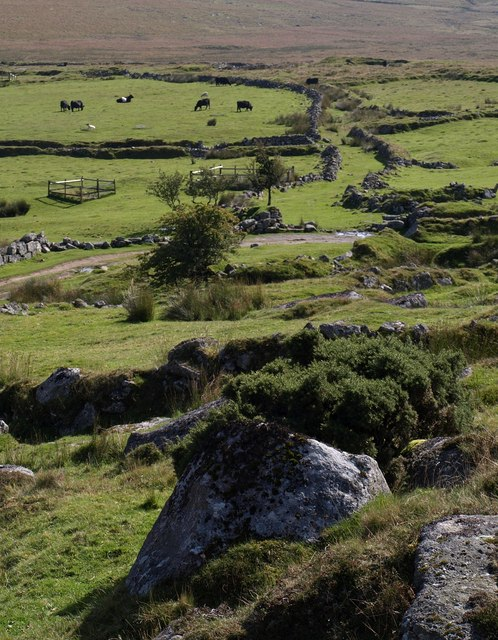
- Remains of tin mining at Whiteworks

- Location within Devon
- OS grid reference: SX 612710
- Shire county: Devon
- Region: South West
- Country: England
- Sovereign state: United Kingdom
- Post town: PRINCETOWN
- Postcode district: PL20
- Police: Devon and Cornwall
- Fire: Devon and Somerset
- Ambulance: South Western

Whiteworks (or White Works) is a former mining hamlet near the town of Princetown, within Dartmoor National Park, in the English county of Devon. Tin mining is central to the history of settlement at Whiteworks, which was once home to one of Dartmoor's largest tin mines. The original cottages and their inhabitants were related to this industry, until the area became used increasingly for farming in the 20th century. The site has now largely been abandoned, although Whiteworks is still on the route of many walks including Abbots Way Walk passes 500 m to the west.

== Geography ==
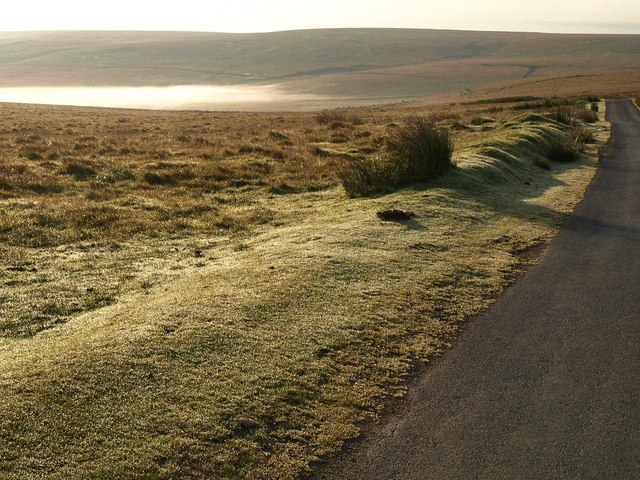
The road to Whiteworks, with Fox Tor Mires on the left

Whiteworks is situated in an area of open moorland about 3 kilometres (2 mi) south-east of Princetown, overlooking the notoriously dangerous Fox Tor Mires. A difficult path leads across the mires to Fox Tor itself, which lies about 1.5 kilometres (1 mi) south-east of the hamlet. Vehicle access to Whiteworks is via a narrow dead-end road branching off from the B3212 at Princetown. This road is an extension of the one constructed by Sir Thomas Tyrwhitt to his property at Tor Royal.

The granite at Whiteworks has been subject to a process of kaolinisation: the feldspar minerals have decomposed to form a white clay known as kaolin. As a result, when the tin ore cassiterite was mined there, it was white in colour, giving the name 'White Works' to the site.

There are a few species of moss particular to the Whiteworks area, namely Polytrichum urnigerum, which is found in streams, and Bryum turbinatum.

== History ==
According to the evidence of stannary rolls, tin working at the Whiteworks mine site dates back to 1180, when it was associated with mediaeval field systems on the eastern edge of Fox Tor. More active mining began around 1790, when the Industrial Revolution began to fuel demand for tin, while also providing the technology to move from opencast mining to subsurface methods, previously impossible on the difficult Dartmoor terrain. Initially, there were no tin smelting houses operating in Devon, so Whiteworks sent tin ore to Calenick Smelting House, near the Cornish town of Truro.

Mining continued irregularly during the 19th century, accompanied by drainage work designed to make the Fox Tor Mire safer. During part of this time the mine was one of the largest on Dartmoor, along with Eylesbarrow and Gobbet. At the beginning of the 1870s, for example, the mine produced 8–9 tons of tin ore per year. At this time, the mine was owned by Tavistock-based mining entrepreneur Moses Bawden.

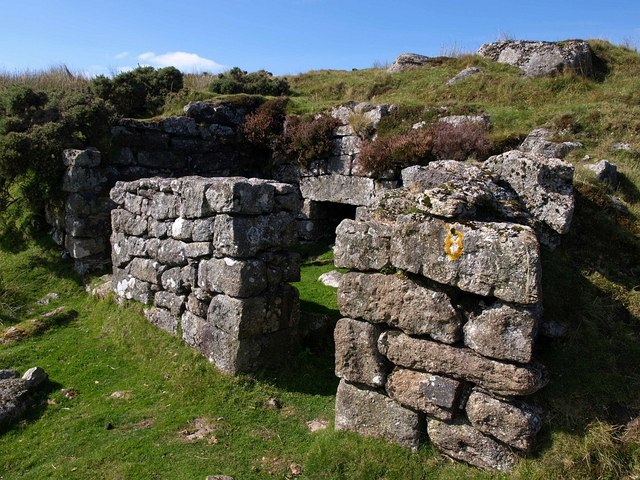
A ruined building on the south-west of the site

By the 1880s the mine was disused, although a revival of ore values at the beginning of the 20th century meant that mining activity was briefly recommenced. Mining at the site then ceased completely in 1914. For these final years of activity, the mine was under shared ownership with Golden Dagger Mine and Hexworthy Mine. Around the turn of the century, a new farmhouse had also been constructed, and with the cessation of mining activity, the land around Whiteworks was increasingly used for livestock farming and breeding animals such as ponies.

By the 1980s, Whiteworks had mostly been abandoned and some of the buildings, including the farmhouse, were demolished by the Dartmoor National Park Authority. A few cottages remain complete, one of which is owned by Plymouth College and used as a base for outdoor activities. Other buildings, related to previous mining or farming activities, lie in ruins, interspersed with the fenced-off remains of mine shafts. These ruins, combined with the surrounding geography, make Whiteworks a popular location for hikers, especially on walks starting in Princetown. The annual Abbots Way Walk on the 1st Sunday in October is on its way from Buckfast Abbey to Tavistock pass with 500 m of Whiteworks.

== Cultural references ==
The hamlet appears in the novel Miser's Money, by Dartmoor author Eden Phillpotts. The area around Whiteworks also provided inspiration to Arthur Conan Doyle for the Sherlock Holmes story The Hound of the Baskervilles: it is believed that the Fox Tor Mire is the location of the fictional Grimpen Mire, which would place Baskerville Hall on the site of the cottages at Whiteworks.
