= Richard Caton Woodville Jr. =

English painter (1856–1927)

Richard Caton Woodville
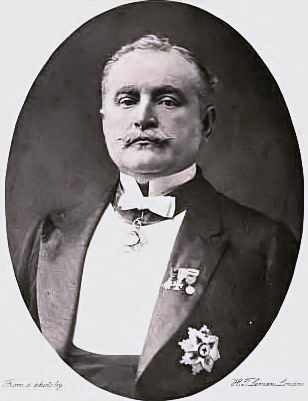
- Born: 7 January 1856; London, England
- Died: 17 August 1927 (aged 71); London, England
- Education: Düsseldorf school of painting
- Known for: Portrait, landscape, illustration, battle painting
- Patrons: Illustrated London News

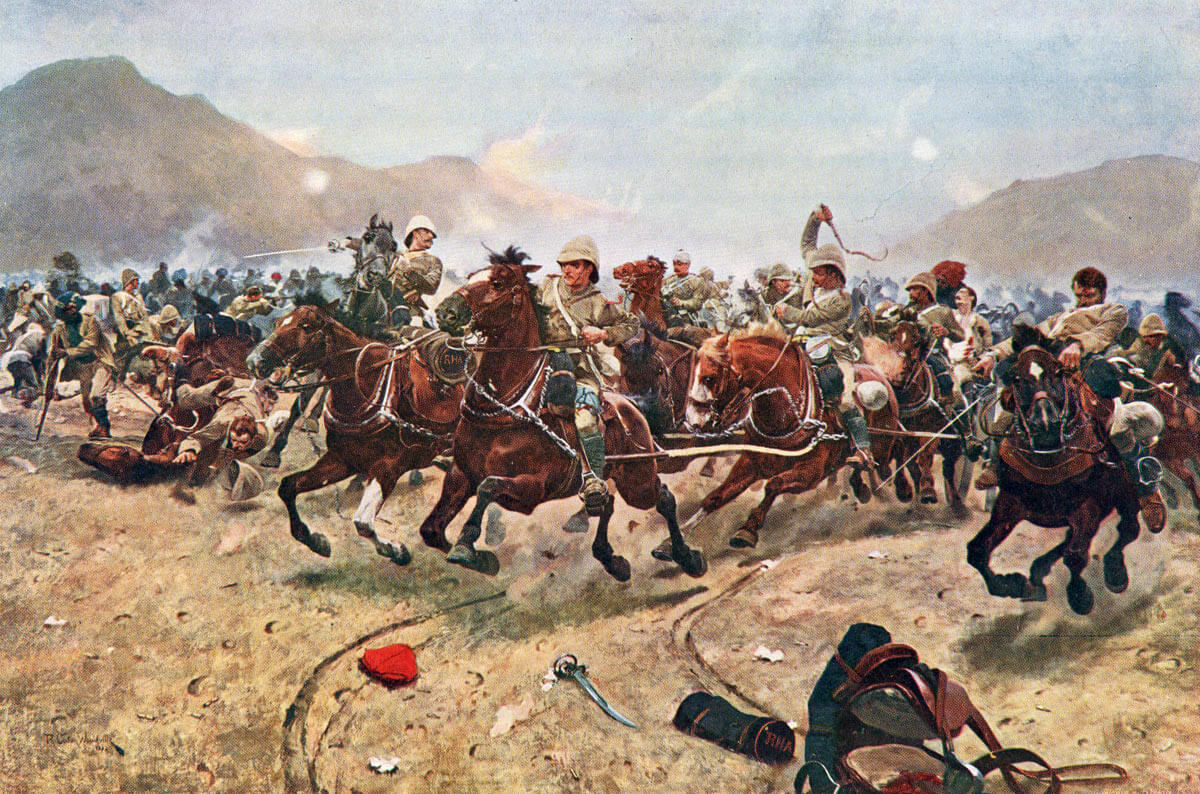
Maiwand: Saving the Guns (Royal Horse Artillery fleeing from Afghan attack at the Battle of Maiwand (painted in 1883)

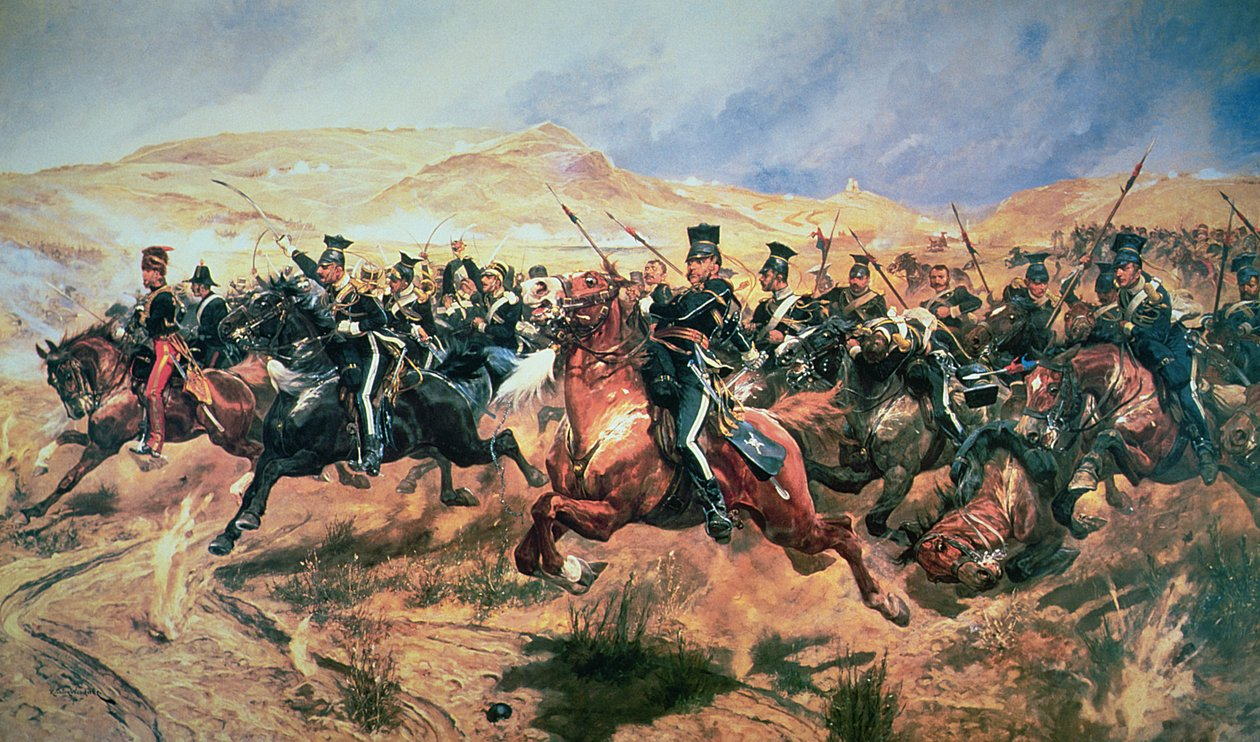
Charge of the Light Brigade, Balaclava, 25 October 1854 (1894)

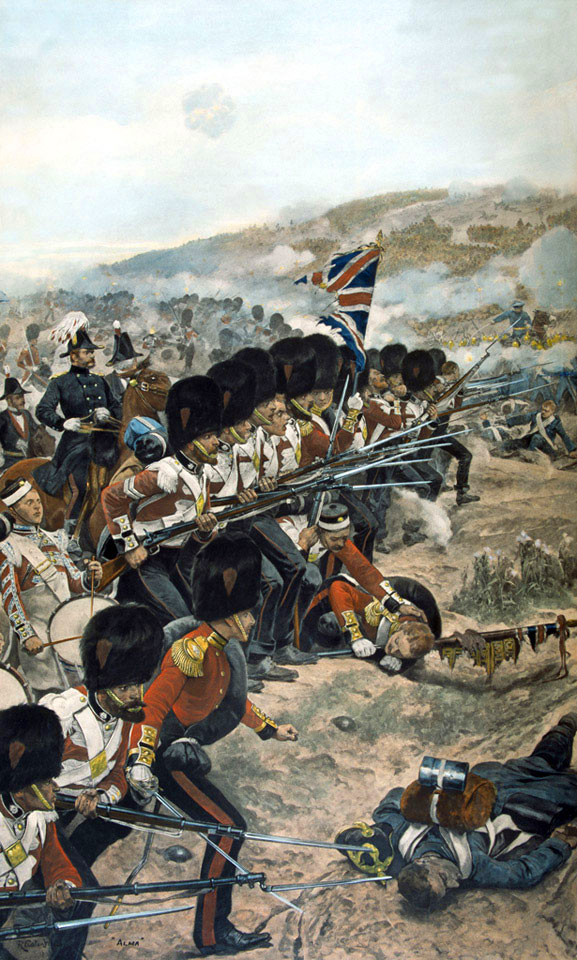
Storming of the Great Redoubt on the Alma River (Battle of Alma in the Crimean War; painted in 1896)

Richard Caton Woodville Jr. RI ROI (7 January 1856 – 17 August 1927) was an English artist and illustrator, who is best known for being one of the most prolific and effective painters of battle scenes in the late 19th and early 20th centuries.

== Biography ==
The son of Richard Caton Woodville Sr., an American who was also a talented artist, Woodville studied at the Kunstakademie Düsseldorf under the Prussian military painter Wilhelm Camphausen, and then Eduard von Gebhardt, both artists of the Düsseldorf School of painting, before briefly studying in Russia and then Paris under Jean-Léon Gérôme. Woodville spent most of his career working for the Illustrated London News, where he quickly developed a reputation as a talented reporter and writer, but was also published in Cornhill Magazine, Strand Magazine, and The Tatler.

Richard Caton Woodville first experienced battle first-hand when he was sent by the Illustrated London News to report upon the Russo-Turkish War (1877–1878), and then again in the 1882 Anglo-Egyptian War, where he made a number of sketches in December 1882, and also obtained photographs of the trenches at Tel-e-Kebir for his friend and co-artist Alphonse-Marie-Adolphe de Neuville, who had been commissioned to paint a scene of the battle.

In 1879, Woodville's Before Leuthen, 3 December 1757 was exhibited in the Royal Academy. It proved popular, and afterwards he began to regularly be exhibited in Burlington House, where 21 of his battle paintings were eventually shown. His most popular works there were ones that dealt with contemporary wars, such as the Second Anglo-Afghan War, Candahar [sic], and Maiwand: Saving the Guns, (Walker Art Gallery), the Zulu War, and the First Boer War. His works from Egypt were exhibited at the Fine Art Society in 1883, where his painting The Moonlight Charge at Kassassin proved popular. The following year he exhibited by Royal Command another painting he had done of the war in Egypt, entitled The Guards at Tel-e-Kebir (Royal Collection). In 1896 he designed the reverse of the British South Africa Company Medal.

He continued to paint scenes of battle, and few battles or wars that Great Britain fought during his life were not touched upon by him, including the Second Boer War, and World War I. Despite his precocious talent for capturing the dramatic moments of contemporary battles, Woodville also enjoyed recreating historical scenes in both oil and watercolour. The Illustrated London News commissioned him to complete a commemorative special series recreating the most famous British battles of history. He depicted The Charge of the Light Brigade (Palacio Real de Madrid) and The Charge of the 21st Lancers at Omdurman (Walker Art Gallery), Battle of Blenheim, Battle of Badajos and several Battle of Waterloo pictures.

During World War I, Woodville was compelled to return to the depiction of current events, and three of his Great War works were displayed in the Royal Academy. These were The 2nd Batt. Manchester Regiment taking six guns at dawn near St. Quentin, Entry of the 5th Lancers into Mons, and Halloween, 1914: Stand of the London Scottish on Messines Ridge (London Scottish Regiment Museum Trust) exhibited in the year of his death, 1927.

During his lifetime, Woodville enjoyed great popularity and was probably considered the best artist of his genre. He wrote as well as painted, and was often the subject of magazine and journal articles. He had a deep passion for the British Army and had even joined the Berkshire Yeomanry in 1879, staying with them until 1914 when he joined the National Reserve as a captain.

He married Annie Elizabeth Hill in 1877 and had twin sons, actor Anthony Caton Woodville and painter William Passenham Caton Woodville, in 1884. His wife sued him for divorce in 1892. In spite of his success, Caton Woodville suffered financial problems, and was declared bankrupt in 1905.

== Death and legacy ==
On 17 August 1927, Woodville was found shot at his studio at St John's Wood; a revolver was also found. An inquest determined that he was of unsound mind when he committed suicide. Caton Woodville died effectively destitute and his grave (No 10112 in the old section of St Mary's Catholic Cemetery, Kensal Green) was not marked at the time of his death. In September 2013 a headstone, commissioned by his great-grandson, was placed on the grave.

Richard Caton Woodville is still exhibited in the National Army Museum, the Tate, Walker Art Gallery, and the Royal Academy.

== Paintings (by date) ==
- Before Leuthen, 3 December 1757 (1879 – Private Collection)
- Turkish Reconnoitring Party in Balkans (Russo-Turkish War) (1878 – Private Collection)
- Candahar: The 92nd Highlanders & 2nd Goorkhas storming Gaudi Mullah Sahabdad, (1881 – Private Collection)
- Cruel To Be Kind, (1882 – National Army Museum)
- The Moonlight Charge at Kassassin (1883)
- Maiwand: Saving the Guns (1883 – Walker Art Gallery)
- In the Nick of Time, (1883 – Private Collection)
- The Guards at Tel-e-Kebir (1885 – Royal Collection)
- The Late Commander Wyatt-Rawson, R.N., killed at Tel-el-Kebir, 13 September 1882, (1885 – Royal Naval College, Greenwich)
- Saladin's Cavalry Charging the Crusaders (1892 – Okehampton Town Hall)
- Napolean and His Marshals Watching a Battle (1892 – Okehampton Town Hall)
- A Cavalry Charge (1892 – Okehampton Town Hall)
- The Charge of the Light Brigade (1894 – Palacio Real de Madrid)
- Waterloo: The Old Guard, (Palacio Real de Madrid)
- The Storming of the Great Redoubt at the Battle of the Alma, (1896 – Coldstream Guards)
- The Relief of the Light Brigade, (1897 – National Army Museum)
- A Gentleman in Khaki, (1899, to promote the charitable efforts of The Absent-Minded Beggar)
- Life Guards charging at the Battle of Waterloo, (1899 – Private Collection)
- Gordon's Memorial Service at His Ruined Palace in Khartoum, the Day after The Battle of Omdurman, (1899 – Royal Collection)
- The Dawn of Majuba, (1900 – The Royal Canadian Regiment Museum, London, Ontario)
- French Hussards fording a River, (1901 – Private Collection)
- Lindlay: Whitsunday, 1900 (Church service on the veldt), (1901 – 5th Battalion, Royal Green Jackets, Oxford)
- All that was left of them, (1902 – 17th/21st Lancers Museum, Belvoir Castle)
- Scotland Yet! On to Victory (Scots Greys at Waterloo), (1904 – Royal Scots Dragoon Guards)
- At the Trumpet's Call (Marston Moor), (1904 – Private Collection)
- General Wolfe Climbing the Heights of Abraham on the Morning of the Battle of Quebec, (1906 – Tate)
- The Returning Orderly, (1908 – Williamson Art Gallery, Birkenhead)
- Napoleon before Wagram, (1909 – Private Collection)
- Sic Transit Gloria Mundi (Retreat from Moscow), (1911 – Private Collection)
- Napoleon Crossing the Bridge to Lobau Island, (1912 – Tate)
- Poniatowski's Last Charge at Leipzig, (1912 – Tate)
- Napoleon conferring the Legion D'Honneur on a Russian General, 1804, (1912 – Private Collection)
- Drawn Sabres: Napoleon's Guards at the Battle of Wagram, West Point
- A Narrow Shave! Dragoon in Napoleon's Army 1810 (Private Collection)
- Marshal Ney at Eylau, (1913 – Tate)
- The First VC of the European War, (1914 – National Army Museum)
- The Last Call (Trumpeter falling at Charge of Light Brigade), (1915 – The Queen's Royal Hussars)
- The Piper of Loos, (King's Own Scottish Borderers Regimental Association)
- The Battle of the Somme, (1917 – Guards Museum)
- The 2nd Batt. Manchester Regiment taking six guns at dawn near St. Quentin, (1918 – Duke of Lancaster's Regiment)
- Entry of the 5th Lancers into Mons, (1919 – Queen's Royal Lancers)
- The Charge of the 9th Lancers at Moncel, 7 September 1914, (1921 – 9th Queen's Royal Lancers)
- Halloween, 1914: Stand of the London Scottish on Messines Ridge (1927 – London Scottish Regiment Museum Trust)

== Paintings (non-military) ==
- Ascending The Great Pyramid
- Tyrol – Turning The Great Corner
- Burma – Minister of State With Attendants
- Bull-Fighting
- Trades – Estate Agent 'Sold'
- Fishing For Bass on the South Coast of England
- London – Hyde Park in the Row
- Lost Their Way

== Gallery ==
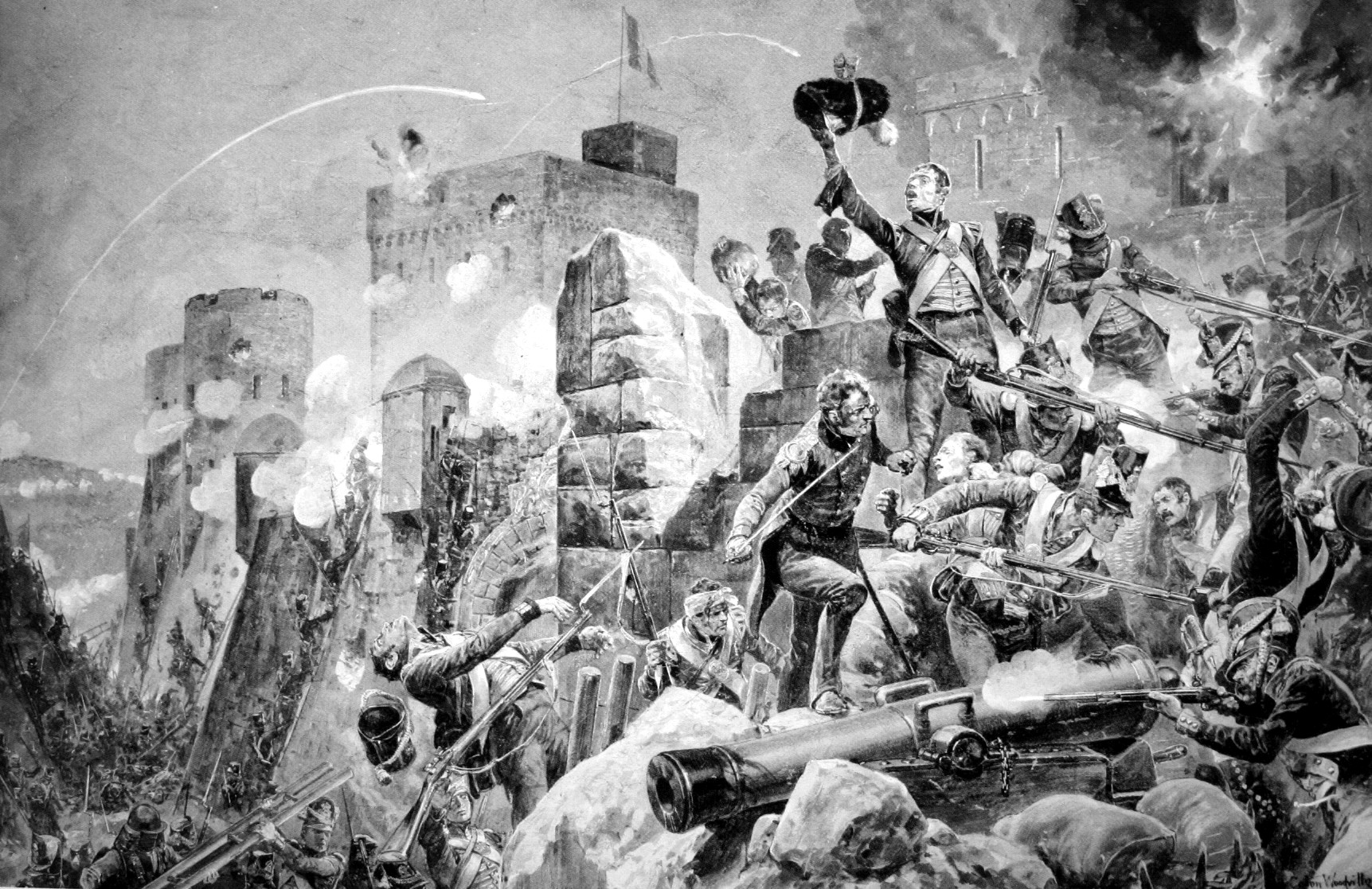
'The Devil's Own' 88th Regiment at the Siege of Badajoz

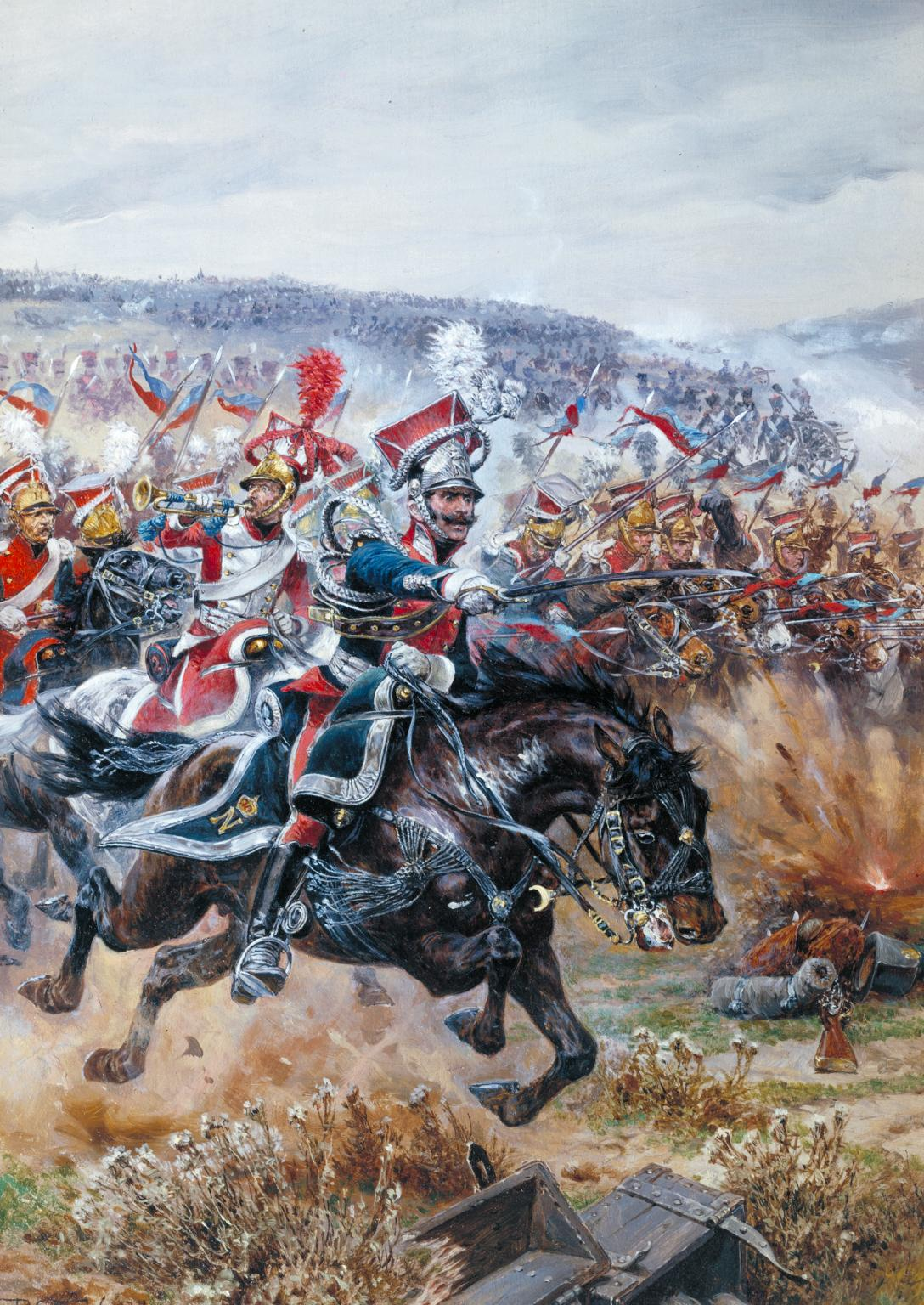
Poniatowski's Last Charge at Leipzig (1912)

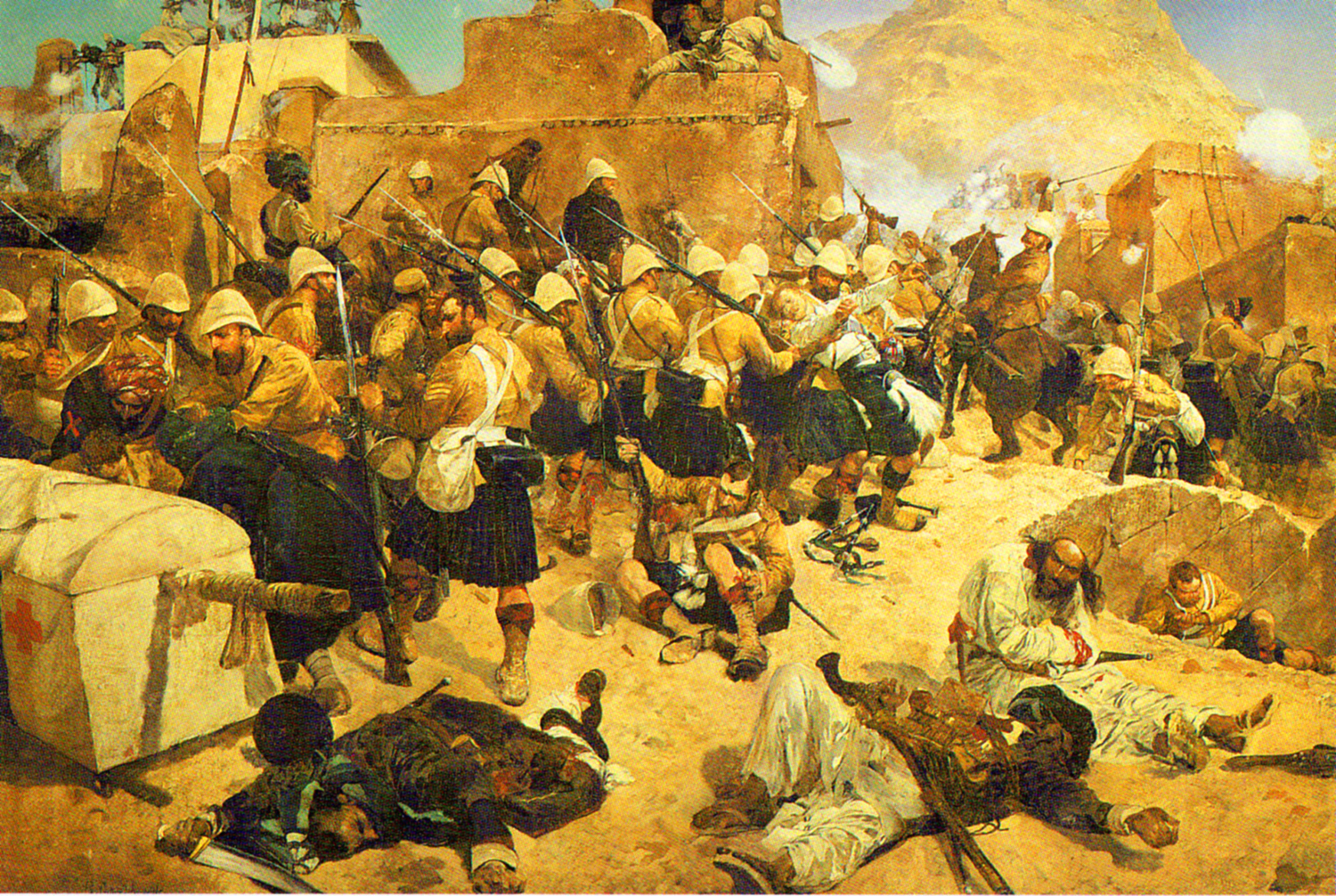
Candahar: The 92nd Highlanders & 2nd Goorkhas storming Gaudi Mullah Sahabdad

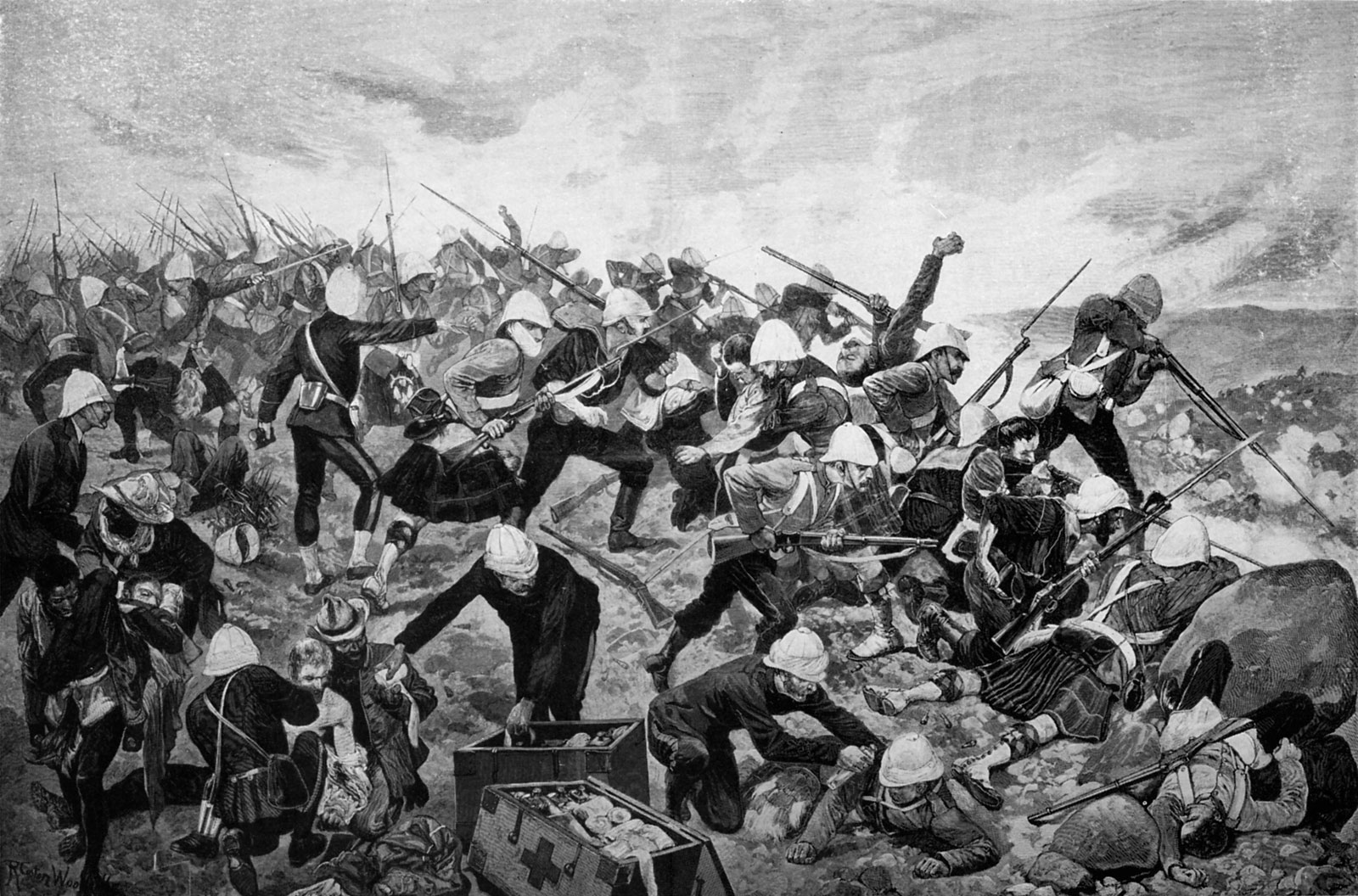
The Battle of Majuba drawn for the Illustrated London News

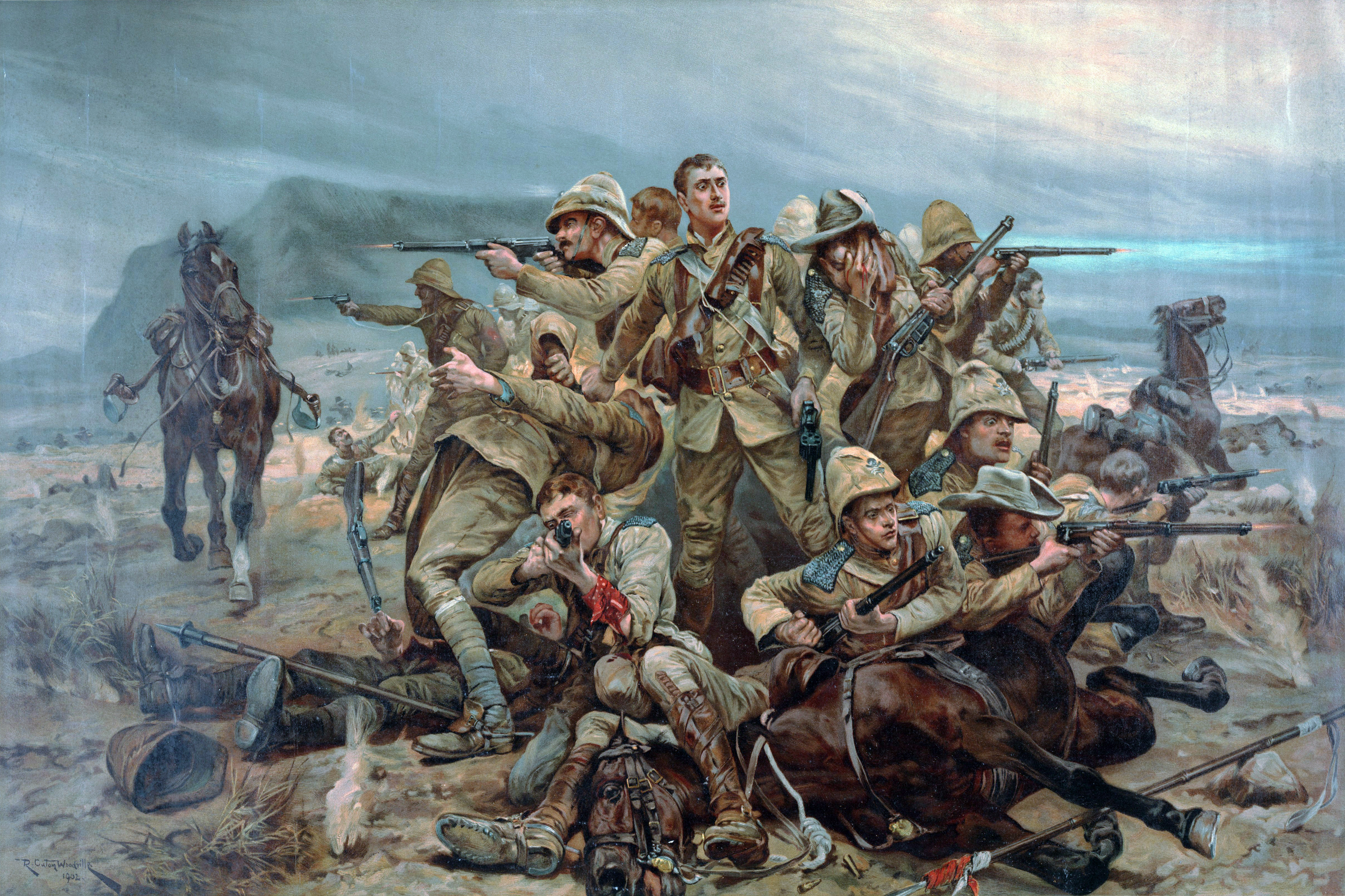
All That Was Left of Them

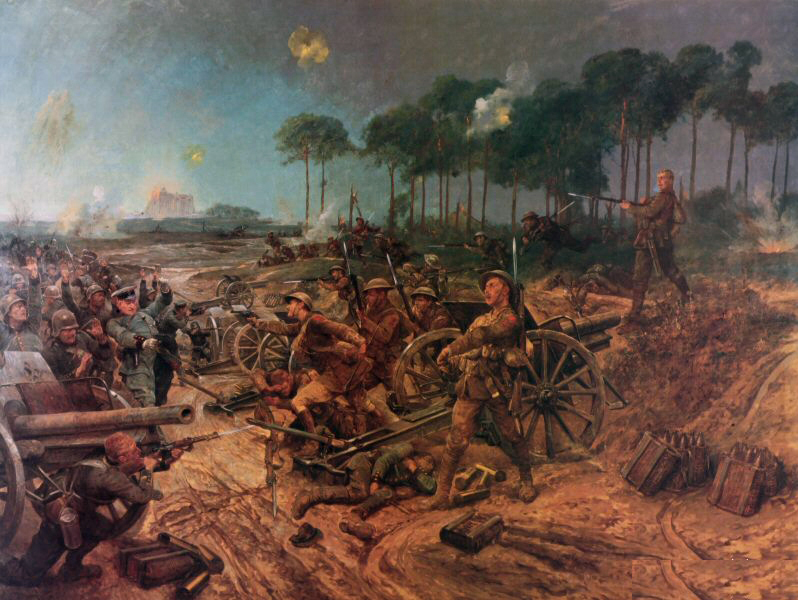
The 2nd Batt. Manchester Regiment taking six guns at dawn near St. Quentin

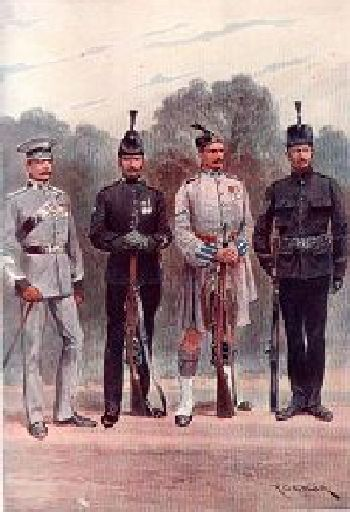
Battalions of the London Regiment

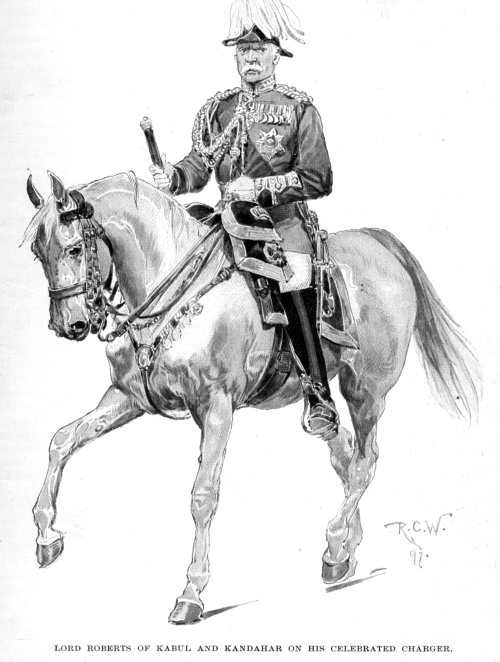
Lord Roberts of Kabul and Kandahar on his Celebrated Charger

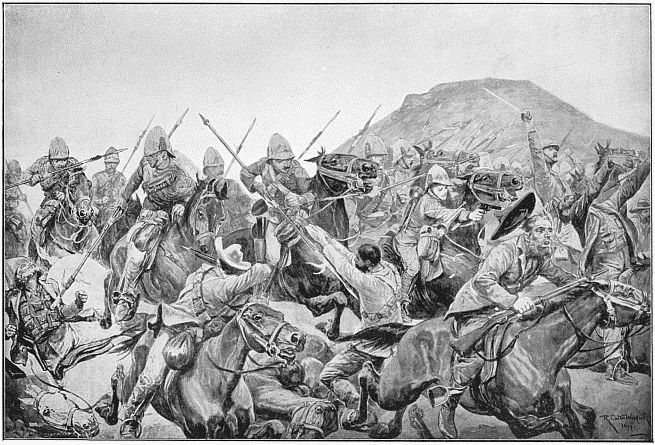
Charge of the 5th Lancers at Elandslaagte

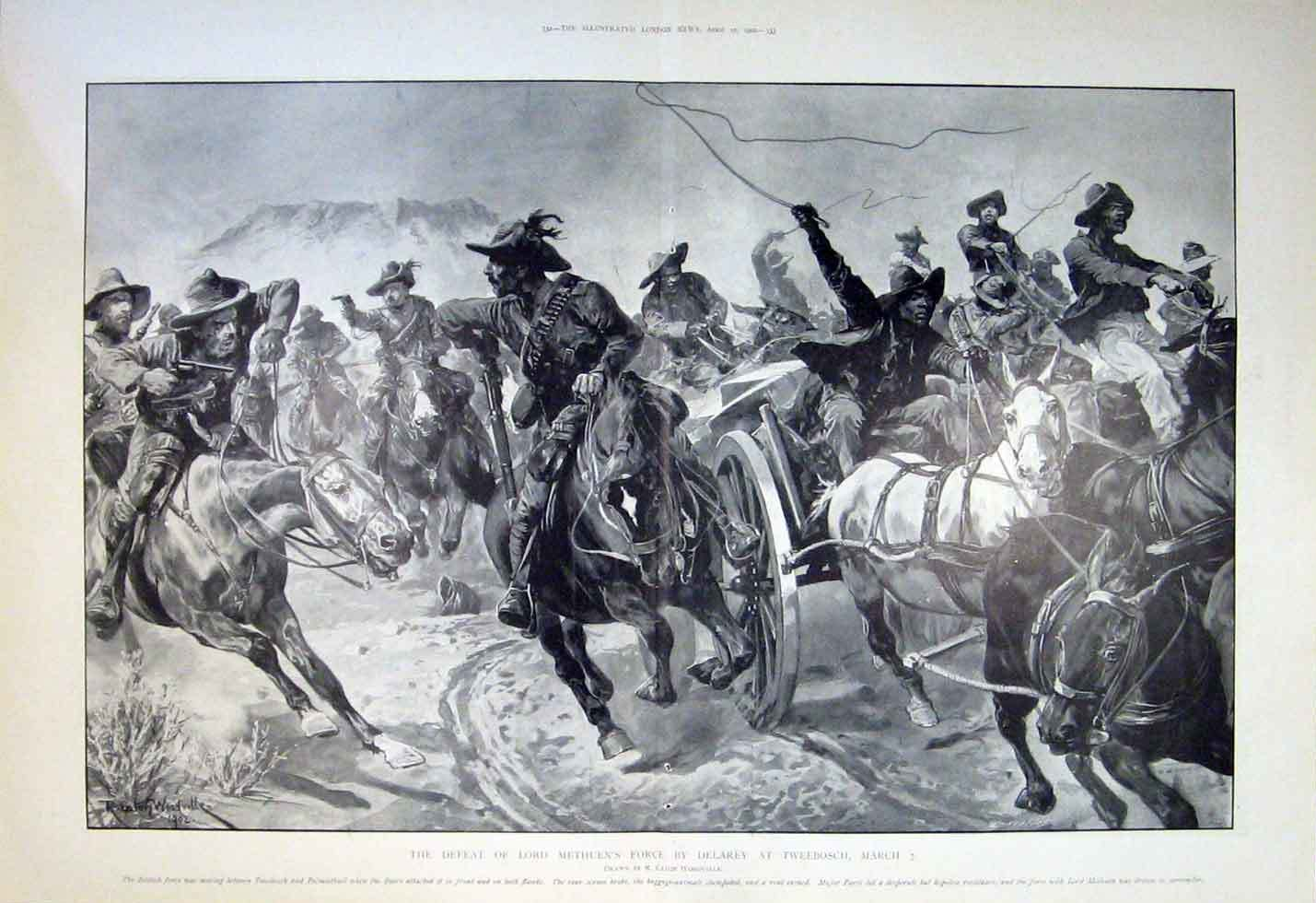
The defeat of Lord Methuen's force by De la Rey at Tweebosch, 7 March 1902

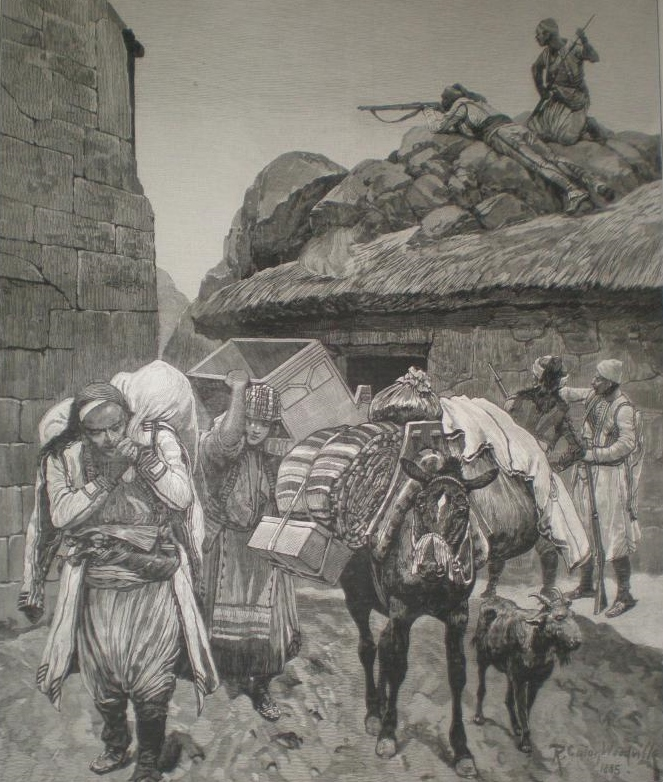
Turkish refugees from Eastern Rumelia in 1885 drawn for the Illustrated London News
