= The Three Crowns Hotel =

Hotel in Chagford, Devon, England

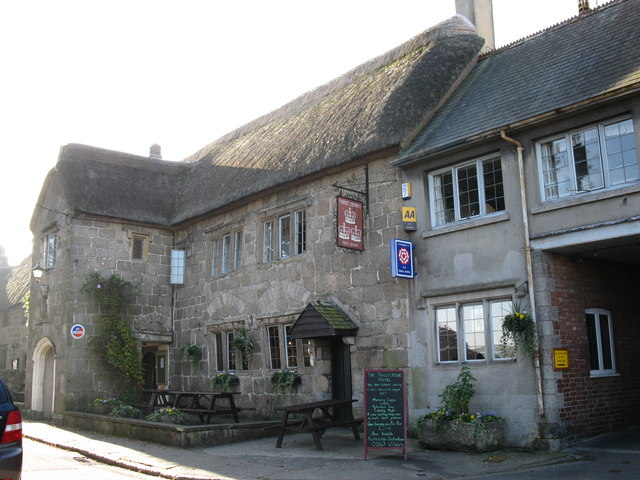

- Location in Devon

General information
- Location: Chagford, Devon, England
- Coordinates: 50°40′21″N 3°50′25″W
- Owner: St Austell Brewery

Other information
- Number of rooms: 21

The Three Crowns Hotel, also Three Crowns Chagford, is a historical hotel in Chagford, Devon, England. The hotel, noted for its granite facade and 13th century features, has 21 rooms.

The oldest block of the building dates to late 16th century. The building has been extended several times over the years. It was a manor house for centuries before becoming an inn (formerly called Black Swan). It is a Grade II* listed building.
