= Spinsters' Rock =

Dolmen in England

Spinster's Rock
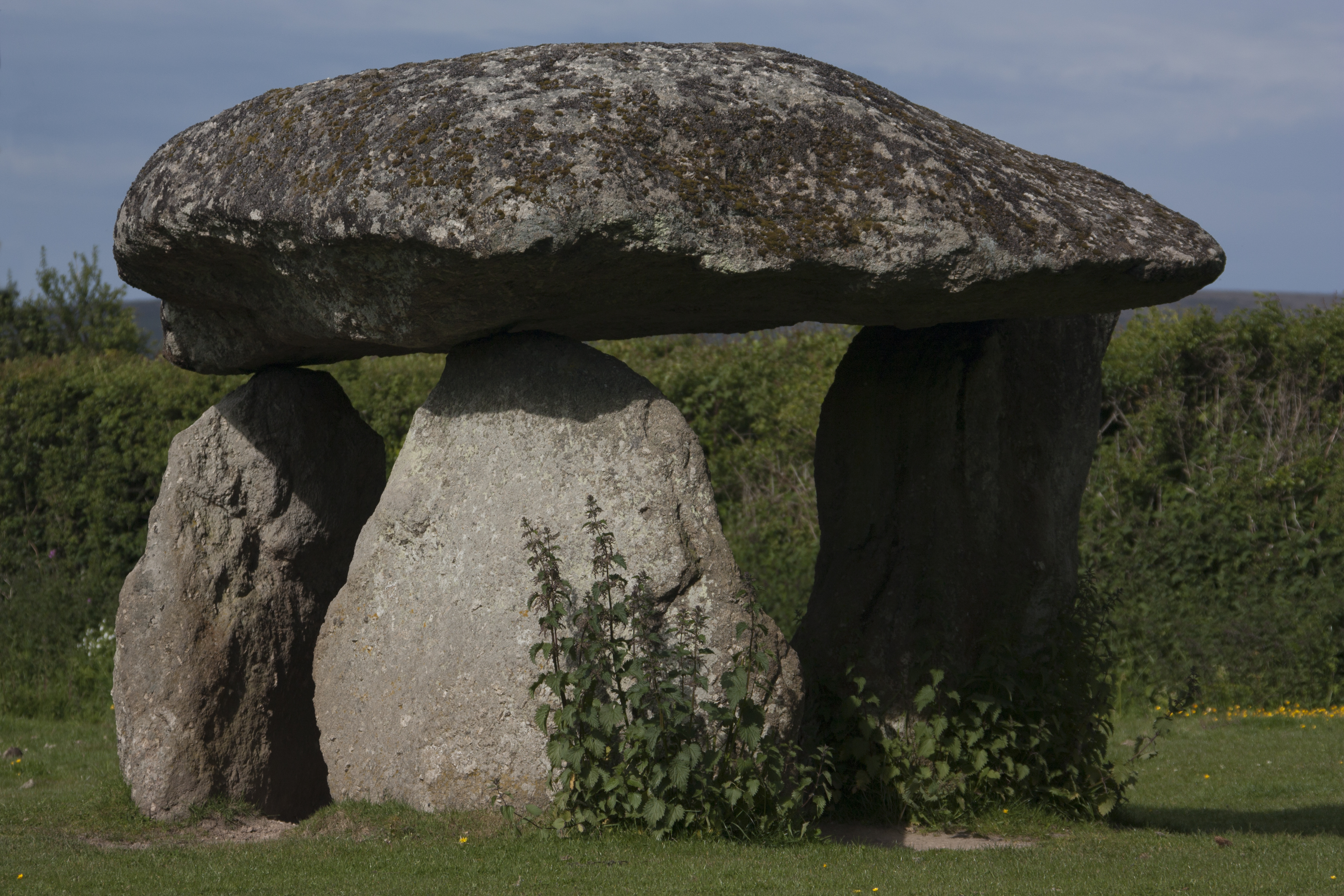
- The dolmen in 2009

- Location in England, United Kingdom
- 50°42′08″N 3°50′27″W
- Type: Dolmen
- Periods: Neolithic
- Location: England, United Kingdom

History
- Built: c. 3000 BC

Site notes
- Material: Granite
- Length: 4.5 m (15 ft)
- Condition: Destroyed and rebuilt: 1862

Spinsters' Rock (grid reference SX701907) is a Neolithic dolmen near Drewsteignton in Devon. It is situated on Shilstone Farm west of the village. It is near the A382 road. The dolmen consists of three granite supports rising to between 1.7 and 2.3 metres (5 ft 7 in and 7 ft 7 in) surmounted by a capstone measuring 4.5 by 3.1 metres (15 by 10 ft). The dolmen collapsed in 1862 but was restored in the same year. No finds were recorded.

There are 18th-century antiquarian reports of nearby stone circles and alignments. These reports are considered to be of "dubious accuracy". There are some free-standing stones nearby, although only two align with Spinsters' Rock.
