= Drewe Arms =

Listed pub in Devon, England

- The pub in 2020
- Former names: New Inn; Druid Arms

General information
- Type: Public house
- Location: The Square, Drewsteignton, West Devon, England
- Coordinates: 50°42′12″N 3°47′30″W
- Completed: 17th century (probable)
- Renovated: Late 19th century (modernised)

Height
- Roof: Reed thatching

Technical details
- Material: Cob

Design and construction
- Designations

Listed Building – Grade II*
- Official name: Drewe Arms public house
- Designated: 22 February 1967
- Reference no.: 1306339
- Known for: Mabel Mudge (longest serving landlady in the UK)

Website
- drewearms.org

The Drewe Arms is a Grade II* listed public house on the north side of The Square in Drewsteignton, a village in West Devon, England. Housed in a building that probably dates from the 17th century, with possible 16th-century origins, it was remodelled in the late 19th century. The pub is noted for its largely intact historic interior, which is regarded by CAMRA as being of "outstanding national historic importance". It was run by Mabel Mudge for 75 years from 1919 until her retirement, and after closing in 2022 was purchased by the local community and reopened in March 2024.

== History ==
The public house with private accommodation probably dates from the 17th century, with possible 16th-century origins, and was modernised in the late 19th century. The deed dates the Drewe Arms to 1890, when the pub was known as the New Inn. The name was changed to the Druid Arms, and then to the Drewe Arms in the 1920s.

In 1919 the pub was taken over by Mabel Mudge, who ran the pub for 75 years before retirement, giving her the record of the longest-serving landlady in the United Kingdom.

On 22 February 1967, the Drewe Arms was designated a Grade II* listed building. It was included on the Campaign for Real Ale (CAMRA)'s National Inventory of Historic Pub Interiors before the inventory's grading system was revised. Under the revised scheme, it is rated three stars and its interior is regarded as being "of outstanding national historic importance".

The pub was later owned by Whitbread, Enterprise Inns and Stonegate. However, a number of tenants found it difficult to operate profitably. After closing in 2022, the pub was bought by the local community and reopened in March 2024.

== Architecture ==
=== Exterior ===
The building is constructed of cob on a stone base, with stone chimney stacks, one of which retains its original granite chimney. The others were rebuilt in brick in the late 19th century. The roof is mainly thatched, with later rear additions covered in corrugated iron and slate.

The pub has a T-shaped layout and faces onto the village square. It appears to have originated as a house with three principal rooms connected by a passage, although later alterations absorbed the passage into an enlarged kitchen and blocked the original doorways. While it may once have had an open hall, no clear evidence survives because the current roof dates from the 17th or 18th century. The present arrangement largely reflects a late 19th-century refurbishment. The main entrance now opens into the bar, formerly a parlour, which has been divided into two smaller rooms. Additional passages connect the main rooms with the kitchen, staircase and later rear extensions, which provide cellar space, lavatories and extra accommodation for customers.

The main building has two storeys and a four-window frontage dating from the late 19th century. The entrance, set slightly left of centre, contains a partly glazed door beneath a simple timber canopy, and the roof has gabled ends.

=== Interior ===
The interior largely reflects a comprehensive late 19th-century refurbishment, with many of the joinery details and fittings from that period surviving largely unchanged. Formed from a group of former cottages, the building retains evidence of its gradual development, including substantial internal walls and changes in floor levels. The pub preserves a traditional multi-room layout, notably without a bar counter, with the principal public room separated from the serving area by a panelled partition and drinks served through a stable-style opening.

Fixed seating survives in several rooms, and a former domestic room was later incorporated into the pub. Another historic room, formerly used as a dining room for guests, retains a fixed bench and a fireplace with a granite surround. Little modernisation has taken place since the late 19th century, although earlier timber features remain visible, including exposed beams in the bar, hall and kitchen. Structural timbers visible within the roof are thought to date from the 17th or possibly 18th century, while the fireplaces are fitted with 19th-century grates that block the original openings.

== See also ==
- Grade II* listed buildings in West Devon
