= Okehampton Town Hall =

Municipal building in Okehampton, Devon, England

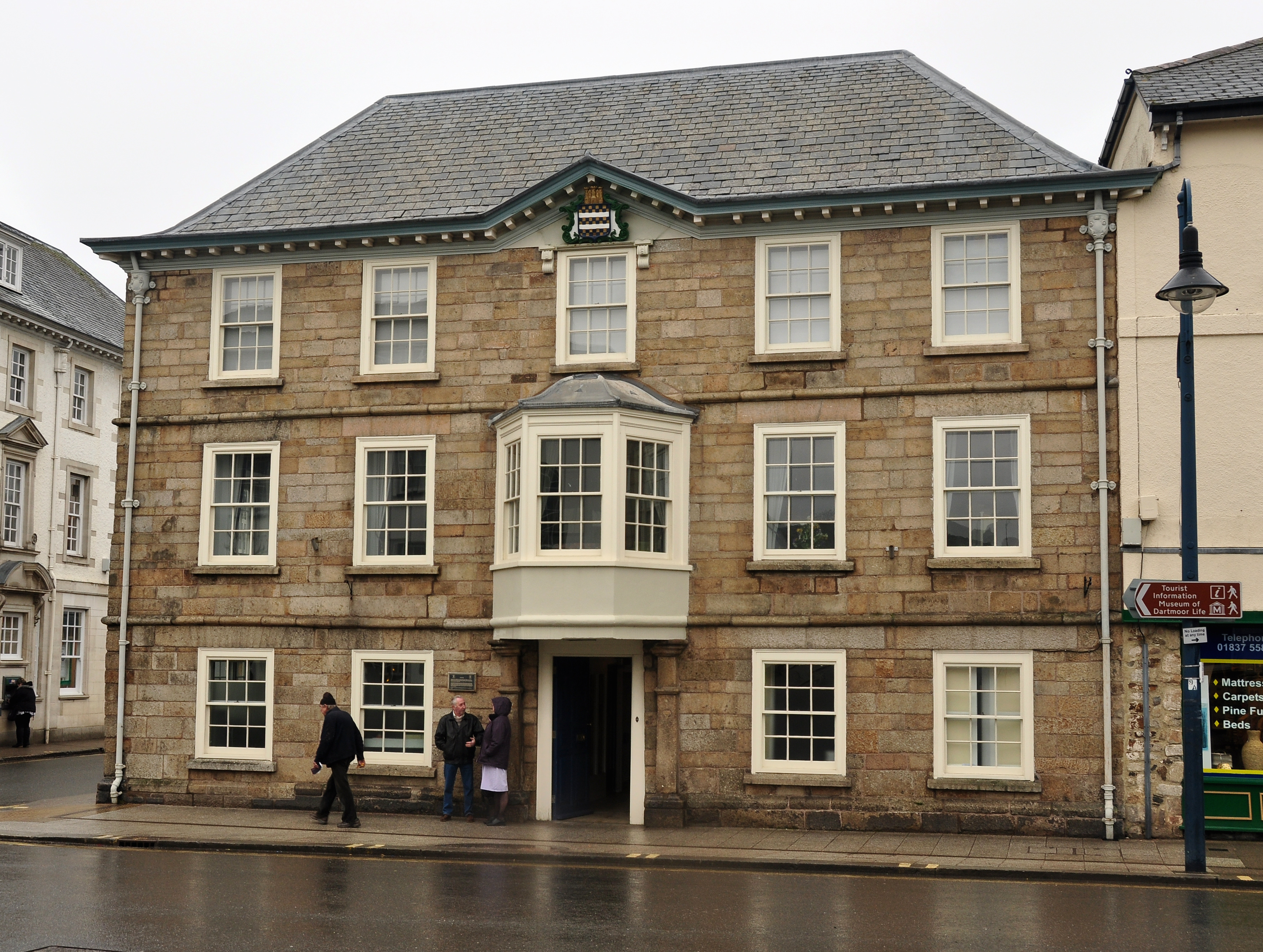
- Okehampton Town Hall

- Shown in Devon
- 50.7391°N 4.0033°W
- Location: Fore Street, Okehampton

History
- Built: 1685

Site notes
- Architectural style: Neoclassical style

Listed Building – Grade II*
- Official name: Town Hall, Fore Street
- Designated: 5 February 1952
- Reference no.: 1105855

Okehampton Town Hall is a municipal building in Fore Street, Okehampton, Devon, England. The town hall, which is the meeting place of Okehampton Town Council, is a Grade II* listed building.

== History ==
The first municipal building in the town was a medieval guildhall in Middle Row which itself was located in the centre of Fore Street. By the early 19th century Middle Row was in a dilapidated state and, in 1800, legislation was enacted giving authority to the borough council to demolish the whole street.

The current building was commissioned by John Northmore, an attorney to the Court of King's Bench. It was designed in the neoclassical style, built in ashlar granite and was completed in 1685. The design involved a symmetrical main frontage with five bays facing onto Fore Street; the central bay featured a doorway flanked by pilasters supporting a canted bay window with an ogee-shaped roof on the first floor; there was a sash window with a cornice supported by consoles on the second floor. The outer bays were fenestrated with sash windows on all three floors. At roof level, there was a modillioned cornice which was broken to create an open pediment above the central bay. Internally, the principal room was a large wooden panelled reception room on the ground floor.

The building was acquired by the local member of parliament, John Luxmoore, in 1740. It then passed down the Luxmoore family until it was acquired by the borough council for use as a town hall in 1821. A carving of the borough coat of arms, finished in gold and silver leaf, was installed in the open pediment. Okehampton had a very small electorate and two dominant patrons, who in the 18th century were Thomas Pitt and the Duke of Bedford, which meant it was recognised by the UK Parliament as a rotten borough. Its right to elect members of parliament was removed by the Reform Act 1832 and its borough council, which continued to meet in the town hall, was reformed under the Municipal Corporations Act 1883.

A classroom for teaching science and technology was established in the town hall in 1893. The town hall continued to serve as the headquarters of the borough council for much of the 20th century, but ceased to be the local seat of government when the enlarged West Devon District Council was formed at Tavistock in 1974. It instead became the meeting place of Okehampton Town Council.

Works of art in the town hall include three paintings by Richard Caton Woodville Jr. depicting Saladin's cavalry charging the Crusaders, Napoleon and his marshals watching a battle and a 19th-century cavalry charge. There is also a portrait of an old man by Gaspar de Crayer entitled Memento mori, a painting by John Frederick Herring Sr. depicting a farmyard and a still life painting by Cornelis de Heem.

== See also ==
- Grade II* listed buildings in West Devon
