= Huckworthy =

Hamlet in Devon, England

Coordinates: 50°31′00″N 4°4′20″W

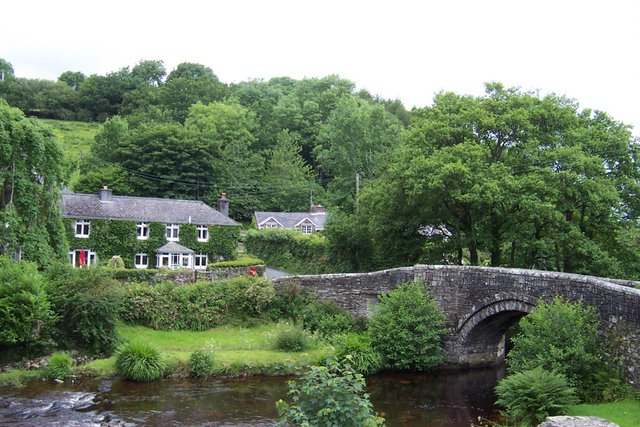
Huckworthy Bridge

Huckworthy is a small hamlet on the edge of Dartmoor in Devon, England.

With just 11 houses in a steep valley the hamlet epitomizes the rural wilds of the area. The River Walkham runs through it, dissecting the community in half and setting the scene for the picturesque Huckworthy Bridge that has been featured in wildlife, travel and historical programs over the years. The bridge is also featured in Country Diary of an Edwardian Lady.

The bridge provides inspiration as a place of great tranquility, but also of innovation and commerce - Huckworthy Mill provided the first electricity into the local villages in the early 20th century, Wedgwood allegedly sourced some of the first cobalt for its famous blue china on the Mill property, old silver mines dot the valley and various small businesses still thrive there to this day.
