= Exbourne =

Village and civil parish in Devon, England

- Village
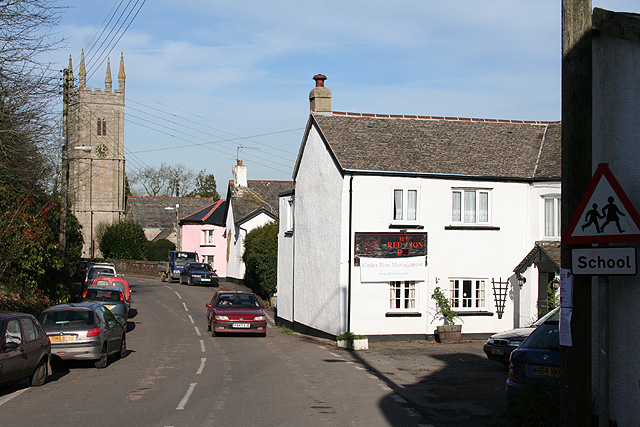
- Exbourne

- Location within Devon Location within the United Kingdom
- Coordinates: 50°48′N 3°59′W
- Country: England
- County: Devon
- Highest elevation: 484 m (1,588 ft)
- Lowest elevation: 280 m (920 ft)

Population (2011)
  - Total: 1,695
- Time zone: UTC+0:00 (GST)

Exbourne is a village and civil parish in the English county of Devon. The Anglo-Saxon origin of the name is Gæces Burn - Cuckoo Stream. It occupies a hillside location between the River Okement and the Hole Brook, about 5 miles north of Okehampton in West Devon, and height above sea level ranges between 280 Ft. and 484 Ft. It lies in a primarily agricultural location and the local parish council represents both Exbourne and nearby Jacobstowe. The population of the ward which represents Exbourne and all surrounding villages was 4148 at the 2021 census.

== Overview ==
The village contains a Conservation Area, in which the principal building is the Church of St Mary with its embattled tower and some fabric dating from XIV c. The present manor house was built ca. 1830, and the manorial court was formerly held at Court Barton.

There is a Church of England Primary School which has three classes with about sixty children on roll. Other public buildings include the Methodist Chapel and the Village Hall, which was formerly the Manor Hall. An early Bible Christian chapel and Sunday School still stand, converted for residential use.

The public house is called the 'Red Lion' which has undergone extensive work.

There is an eco-friendly underground community shop, cafe and post office (opened 2012), which has been funded through grants and local funding.

A garage, filling station and car workshop (RB Tyres) lies at the crossroads with the A3072.

At the boundary with Jacobstowe stands an ancient packhorse bridge over the Okement river.
