= Drewsteignton =

Village in Devon, England

Coordinates: 50.703°N 3.789°W

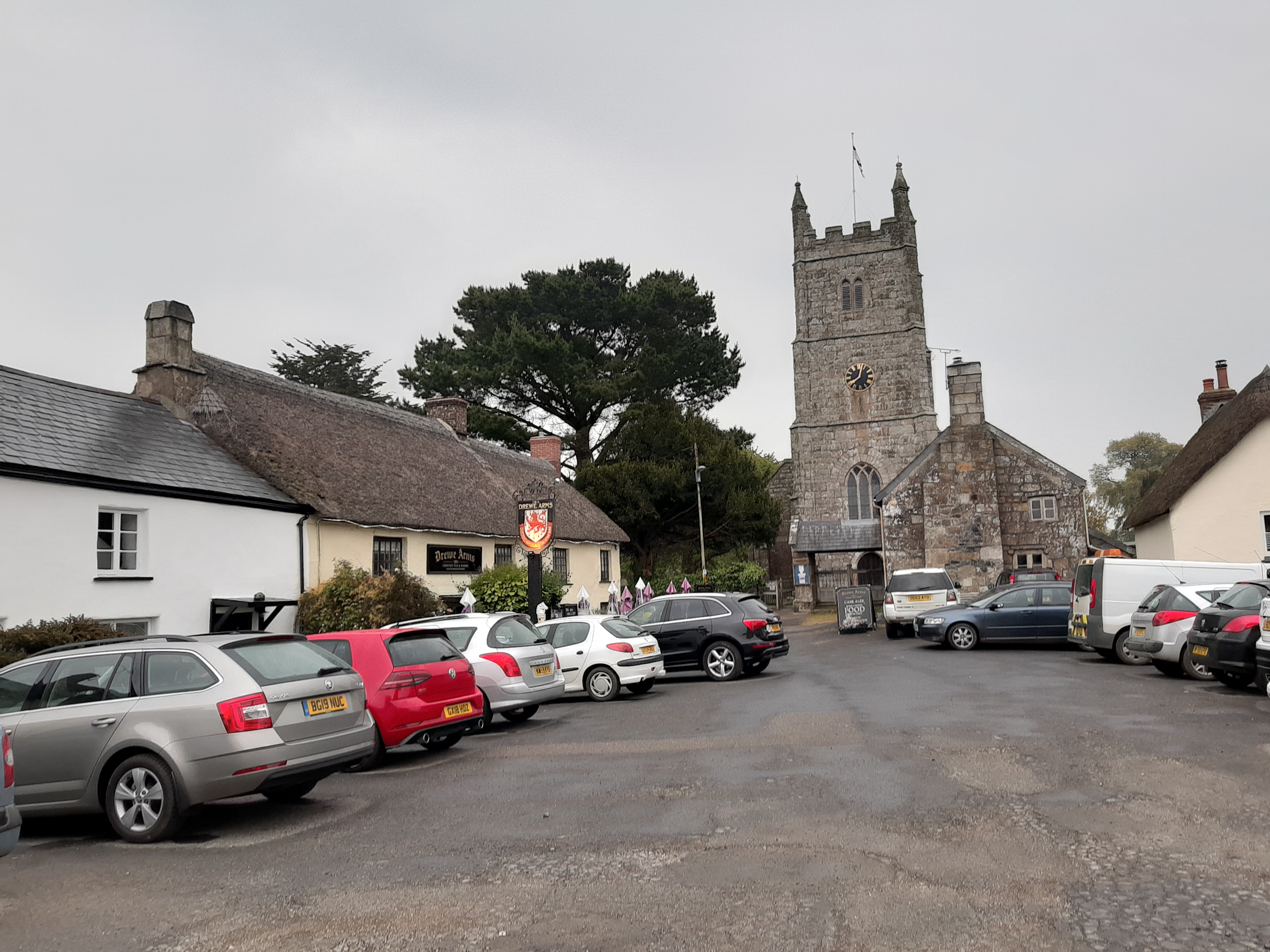
- Square of Drewsteignton in May 2019, showing the Drewe Arms and Holy Trinity Church

- Location within Devon
- Population: 818 (2001 Census)
- OS grid reference: SX736908
  - London: 190 miles (306 km)
- Civil parish: Drewsteignton
- District: West Devon
- Shire county: Devon
- Region: South West
- Country: England
- Sovereign state: United Kingdom
- Post town: EXETER
- Postcode district: EX6
- Dialling code: 01647
- Police: Devon and Cornwall
- Fire: Devon and Somerset
- Ambulance: South Western
- UK Parliament: Central Devon
- Website: http://www.drewsteigntonparish.co.uk/

Drewsteignton is a village, civil parish and former manor within the administrative area of West Devon, England, also lying within the Dartmoor National Park. It is located in the valley of the River Teign, 13 miles (21 km) west of Exeter and 9 miles (14 km) south east of Okehampton. Visitor attractions in the area include the village centre itself, nearby Castle Drogo, and Fingle Bridge. The population of the ward at the 2011 census was 1,616.

== History ==
Settlement in the area dates back to the Neolithic period. Spinsters' Rock at Shilston, within the parish, is a Neolithic chambered tomb dating from around 3000 BC, and there are stone circles of similar date in the area. Later, an Iron Age hill fort, now known as Prestonbury Castle, was developed on the end of a prominent ridge.

=== Manor ===
The manor of Taintone (meaning in Anglo-Saxon "a settlement beside the (River) Teign") is listed in the Domesday Book of 1086 as the 107th of the 176 Devon landholdings of Baldwin the Sheriff, otherwise known as Baldwin FitzGilbert and Baldwin de Meulles. He held it in demesne. He was William the Conqueror's Sheriff of Devon and held lands granted to him personally by the king in Devon, which comprised the feudal barony of Okehampton, including Taintone. In the reign of King Henry II (1154-1189) it was held by a certain ‘Drew’, also known in Anglo-Norman French as Drew de Teignton, Latinized to Drogo, from whom the manor derived its distinguishing suffix. However by 1242 it had passed from the Drew family and was held by the Daubernon (or Dabernon) family. Later it passed to the Carew family of Antony in Cornwall and at some time before 1810 was sold off piecemeal by Reginald Pole-Carew (d.1835).

In later years a myth developed, encouraged by the presence of the archaeological remains, that the Drew part of the name derived from the presence of druids, but there is no evidence to support this.

In mediaeval times the village was relatively prosperous. It was important as a wool-producing area, and there were also limestone quarries and a small tin mine. The village was a stopping place on the old road from Exeter to Okehampton. Much of the village buildings are of granite, as is Fingle Bridge, over the Teign, which was built in the 16th or 17th century. Historically the village formed part of Wonford Hundred.

The parish church of Holy Trinity dates mostly from the 15th century, with some later rebuilding. Elias Tozer (1825–73) visited the village when they were ringing the church bells, "'They be often ringing, sir,' observed an old man to me; and he continued: 'The ringers be vurry fond of the bells, and sometimes they ring vor vurry little. T'other day Varmer Dadd killed a peg, and gied the natlins to the poor of the parish. Darned if the ringers didden ring vor a whole hour, as they zed, to cillebrate the hayvent.'" The village square adjoining the church may date from the original formation of the settlement. Census information indicates that Drewsteignton underwent prolonged depopulation through the 19th century, and many of its buildings have remained largely unchanged since then. The centre was designated as a conservation area in 1972.

The nearby but now disused quarry was worked extensively in the 18th and into the 19th century. Limestone was extracted for road-building as well as construction. A number of workers were employed and seven cottages, bakery and blacksmith's workshop made up Wynbeam Cross and Kiln Village to the south of the workings. Various original lime kilns are in a degraded state but remain visible on site. Limestone extraction ended in 1906-9, and one of the two main pits was filled with water. Further commercial activity at the site took place in the later 20th century, finally ending in 1991.

Among the village buildings is the Drewe Arms, a pub retaining some historic features. Previously known as The Druids' Arms, the name was changed in the 1920s when Julius Drewe built Castle Drogo, his family home. The pub was managed by Mabel Mudge, originally with her husband, from 1919 until 1994 when she retired at the age of 99, the oldest pub landlady in the country.

== See also ==
- Castle Drogo
