= Sticklepath =

Village in Devon, England

Coordinates: 50°44′N 3°56′W

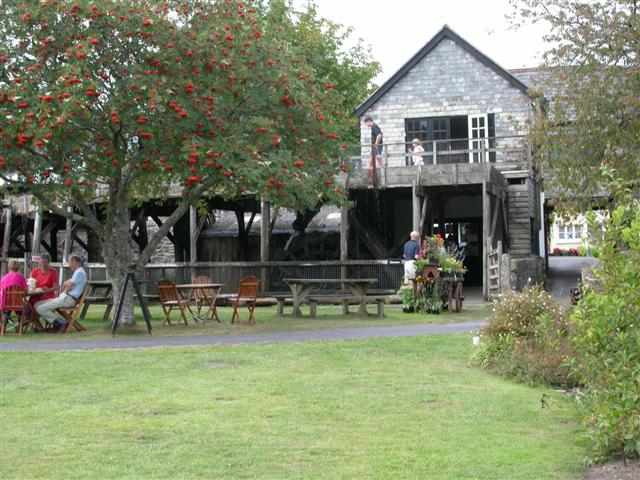
Finch Foundry, Sticklepath

Sticklepath is a village and civil parish on Dartmoor, in West Devon district, county of Devon, England. It gives its name to one of the most important geological faults in south-west England, thought to have originated during the Tertiary period and known variously as the Sticklepath fault, Sticklepath fault zone, Lustleigh-Sticklepath fault or Sticklepath-Lustleigh fault.
