= Princetown =

Village in Devon, England

Coordinates: 50.54507°N 3.99422°W

- Location within Devon
- OS grid reference: SX588736
  - London: 181 miles (291 km)
- Civil parish: Dartmoor Forest
- District: West Devon
- Shire county: Devon
- Region: South West
- Country: England
- Sovereign state: United Kingdom
- Post town: YELVERTON
- Postcode district: PL20
- Dialling code: 01822
- Police: Devon and Cornwall
- Fire: Devon and Somerset
- Ambulance: South Western
- UK Parliament: Torridge and Tavistock

Princetown is a village (Note: Despite its name, Princetown is not classed as a town today – it is not included in the County Council's list of the 29 towns in Devon: "Devon Town Profiles". Devon County Council. Archived from the original on 16 May 2013.) located within Dartmoor national park in the English county of Devon. It is the principal settlement of the civil parish of Dartmoor Forest. At the 2021 census, the village had a population of 1,443.

The village has its origins in 1785, when Sir Thomas Tyrwhitt, then secretary to the Prince of Wales, leased a large area of moorland from the Duchy of Cornwall estate, hoping to convert it into good farmland. He encouraged people to live in the area and suggested that a prison be built there. He called the settlement Princetown after the Prince of Wales.

Princetown is the site of Dartmoor Prison. At around 1,430 feet (435 m) above sea level, it is the highest settlement on the moor, and one of the highest in the United Kingdom. It is also the largest settlement located on the high moor. The Princetown Railway, closed in 1956, was also the highest railway line in England: its Princetown terminus was also 1,430 feet above sea level.

== History ==
In 1780, a farm was reclaimed on the site of an ancient tenement near the Two Bridges, and in 1785, Sir Thomas Tyrwhitt set about improving the moor at a place which he named Tor Royal (present day Tor Royal Farm), about 1 km (0.6 mi) south-east of Princetown. The Plume of Feathers Inn also bears this date on its sign. He made an estate and built a house in 1798. Later, the road from Tavistock to Princetown was built, as well as the other roads that now cross the moor.

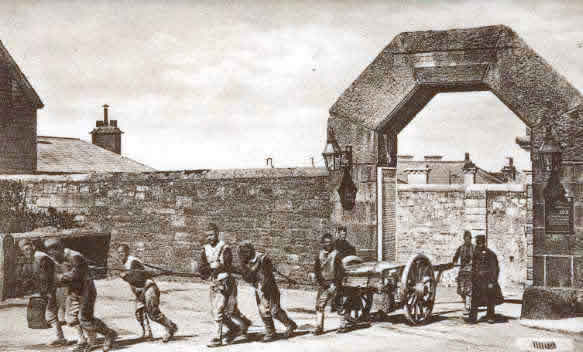
Photograph of prisoners on a work party at Dartmoor Prison about 1900

He also proposed that a prison be built on Dartmoor to house the thousands of captives of the Napoleonic Wars and the later War of 1812, who had become too numerous to lodge in the prisons and prison-ships at Plymouth. The site was given by the Prince of Wales, who held the lands of the Duchy of Cornwall to which the whole moor belonged. This is why the settlement is named Princetown. Dartmoor Prison was built in 1806 at a cost of £130,000. At one time it had a capacity of between 7,000 and 9,000 prisoners, but its operational capacity in 2015 was 660.

A small town grew up near the prison. Two large inns were built during the war – the current Prince of Wales and the former Devil's Elbow / Railway Inn (now the Ramblers' Rest Guesthouse). Many of the prisoners had prize money to come from their own country; many others made their own money in their hammocks at night, even forging Bank of England and local bank notes, which they passed off in the great daily market held in the prison. With the closing of the prison in 1816, the town almost collapsed, but the completion of the Princetown Railway in 1823 brought back many people to the granite quarries. The prison remained derelict until 1851, when it was reopened for prisoners serving long sentences. It has since been considerably extended and although other Victorian era prisons are to remain in service, Dartmoor prison was scheduled to close in 2023, but an extension lease was signed to keep it open beyond that date. The prison closed temporarily in 2024 for radon mitigation and investigation works.

In the 1880s an Officers' Club building was constructed as a rest room for officers and their families. It was extended during the 1970s and remained in use until closure in 2001, largely because very few prison officers lived in Princetown by that date, but commuted in from Plymouth or Tavistock in the main.

The terrace of houses now called Moor Crescent was constructed in 1912 as housing for prison officers of fairly senior rank, in which role it served until the 1980s. After falling into near-derelict condition, it was renovated and is now private housing. Hessary Terrace, which backs onto Moor Crescent, was also constructed as housing for prison officers, as was Heather Terrace.

There is a sports field, now used by Princetown Football Club and known as Legend Park, which formerly belonged to the prison. The sports field and pavilion (now Princetown Pavilion Youth Club) date from the 1890s and were constructed for use by the prison warders. A tennis pavilion was laid out in the 1920s as a base for the tennis court for officers and their families. It was demolished in the 1960s due to its poor state. The bowling green and pavilion were built around the turn of the century and visiting teams of prison staff played matches on many occasions. This was also demolished in the 1960s.

== Geography ==
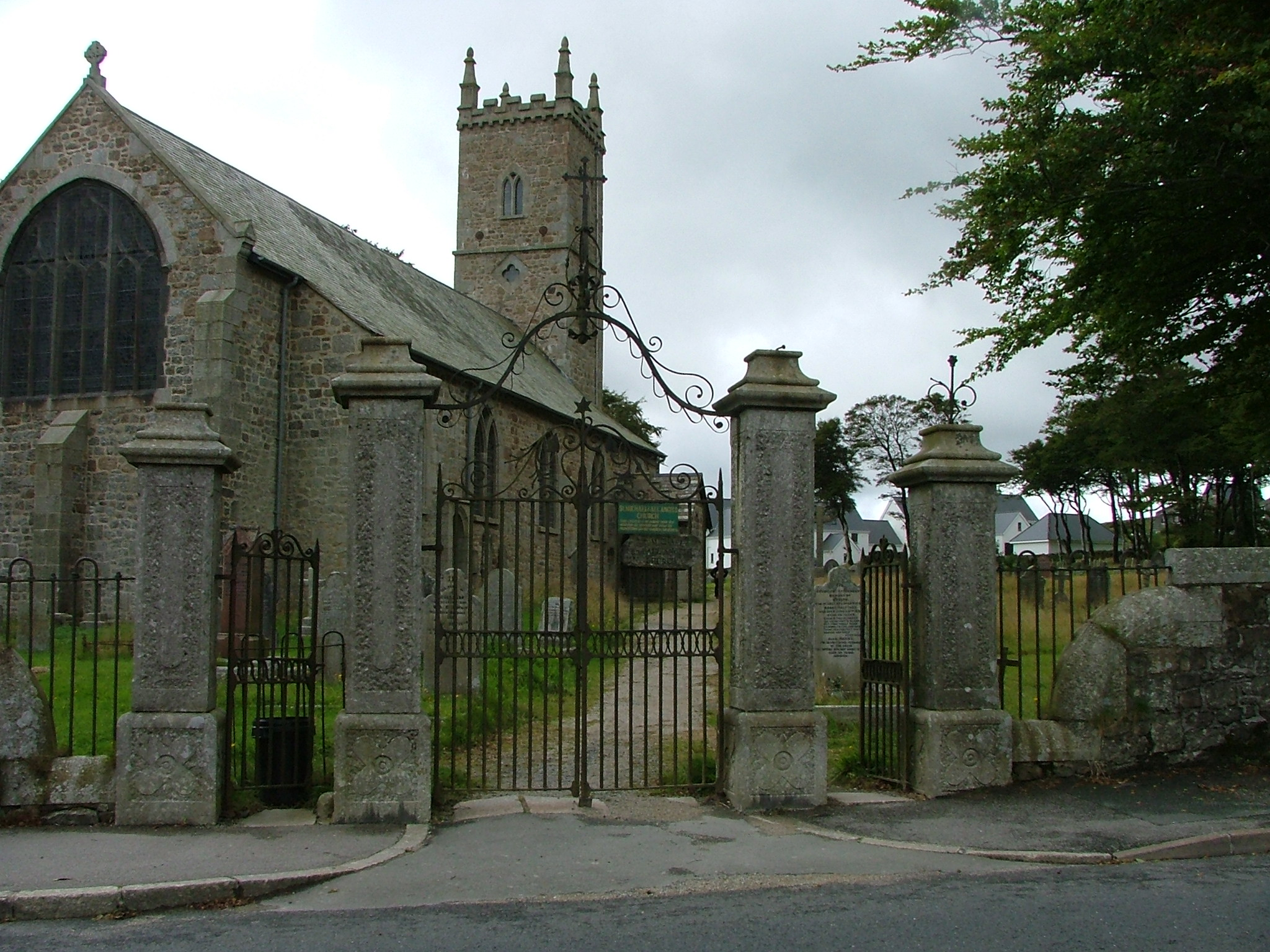
Church of St Michael, Princetown

The village is located on the B3212 road between Yelverton and Two Bridges and is surrounded by moorland. Several footpaths across the moor pass through the village, including one leading west to Sampford Spiney and one leading south to Nun's Cross and Erme Head.

Tor Royal Lane is a dead end road which leads down from the village to the site of the disused Whiteworks tin mine, about 2 miles or 3 km to the south-east, which overlooks Fox Tor Mires, the presumed site of the Grimpen Mire to be found in Arthur Conan Doyle's tale The Hound of the Baskervilles. Conan Doyle stayed at the former Duchy Hotel whilst writing and researching the story with his friend, Bertram Fletcher Robinson. The hotel has long since closed and the building now houses the National Park Visitor Centre which is an all-weather centre and activity hub, with interactive displays, films, exhibitions and a children's discovery area.

Other points of interest in the village include the prison museum which was formerly the prison dairy and behind the prison, two cemeteries – one for French prisoners of war and the other for American prisoners of war who died in the prison when it was a war depot during the Napoleonic War in the 19th century. The cemetery around the Church of St Michael and All Angels includes the graves of convicts who died during their incarceration in the prison. The Church of St Michael has the distinction of being the only one in England constructed by POWs and is dedicated, as are many churches in high locations, to St. Michael. It was taken out of use due to structural problems and damp and is now maintained by the Churches Conservation Trust, although the building has been stabilised and made safe. The United Church of Princetown can be found at the other end of the village.

The village is overlooked from the north-west by North Hessary Tor upon which is a tall transmitting mast that provides a useful guide point for walkers from miles around.

== Demography ==
The village is mainly made up of white British people living in a mix of social and private housing. There are currently 74 children enrolled at the primary school which was rated 'Good' by Ofsted in 2019. The school itself was constructed in 1874 for the children of prison officers. A further 17 children attend the pre-school, which is contained within the Community Centre in its own purpose-built wing. In 2016 the official population estimate was 1447, with a further 640 inmates of the prison. Most people living in Princetown commute to work in Plymouth or Tavistock, but with the expansion of the brewery a few more jobs have been created locally. The population is projected to keep increasing in the future mainly due to the improved amenities within the village itself and the relatively high percentage of young people living there. Princetown is undergoing significant regeneration and expansion, with new private housing built at several sites in the village and a football pitch with car parking built behind the Community Centre. High Moorland Visitor Centre has been renamed as the National Park Visitor Centre, and the area outside the centre altered to include artwork and new seating areas.

== Economy ==
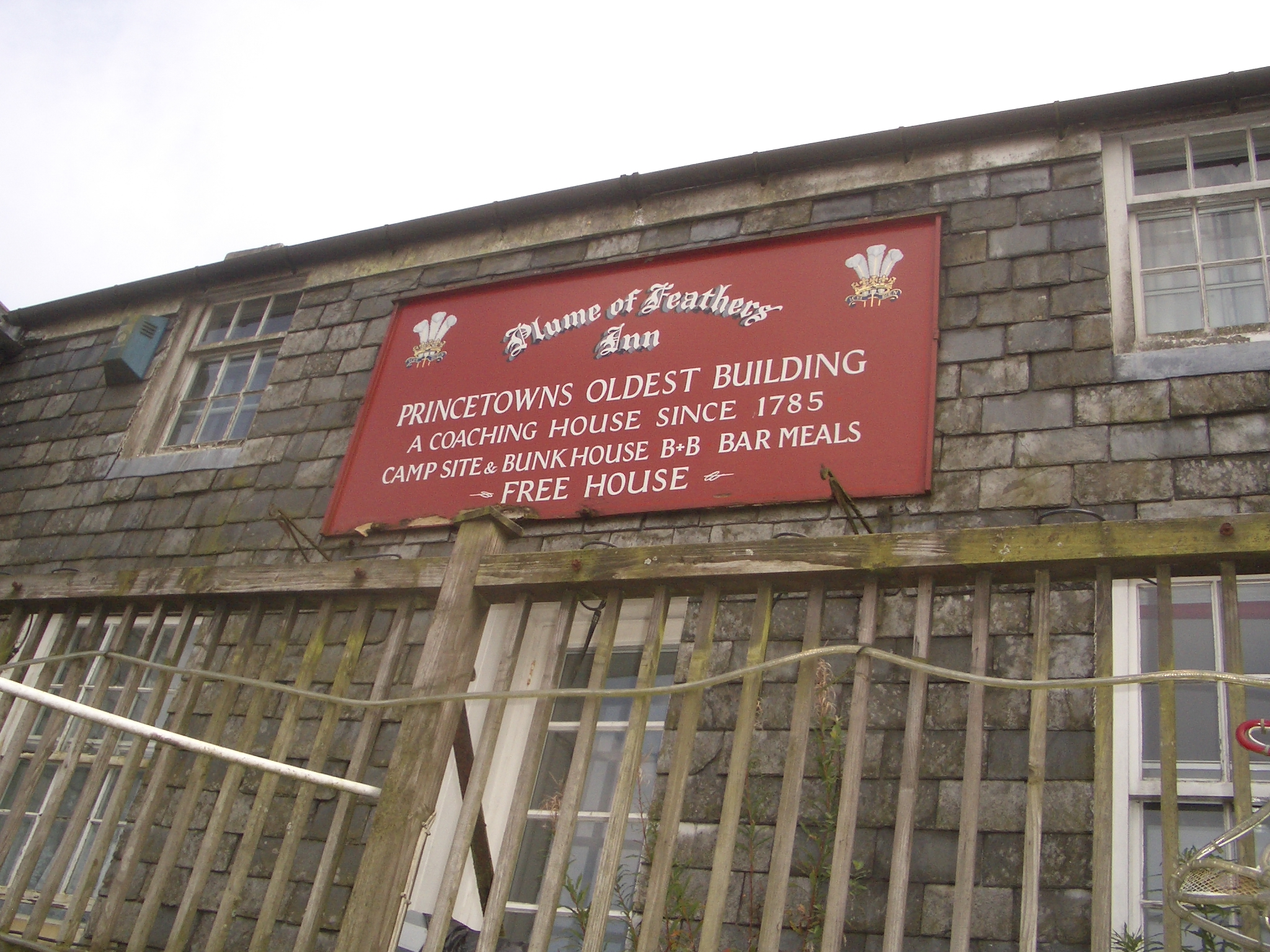
Plume of Feathers public house

In terms of tourism, Princetown is a popular destination and hub for people traversing the moors, and the sight of large groups of hikers, walkers and cyclists is especially common during the summer months. A bunkhouse and camping facilities are available in the village and there are also a handful of local shops. The Dartmoor Ultra Marathon takes place annually, as does the charity Tour de Moor cycle race. The annual Dartmoor Classic cycling sportive regularly passes through Princetown, and the Tour of Britain has passed through as it went across Dartmoor

Princetown has a brewery which used to be housed in the Prince of Wales pub, but now occupies a modern purpose-built building on the edge of the village, close to the former railway. The other pub is the Plume of Feathers (the Railway Inn – "The Devils Elbow" – closed as a pub in 2009 – now the Ramblers' Rest Guesthouse). In April 2017 the go-ahead was given for the construction of a whisky distillery, which invoked controversy due to the destruction of buildings that this would entail. These are the 'Pocket Power Station' (the world's first unmanned power station, demolished in 2021) and the older power station building that was in use until 1947, and now sits derelict after prior use as a business. As of early 2024, the building is near completion.

In recent years Princetown has seen the opening of both the Princetown Centre for Creativity in Duchy Square, on the site of the former village supermarket, which closed in 2011 but has now re-opened as the Duchy Square Centre, housing business tenants, and a new village community centre opened in 2008, which also houses a GP surgery, library and pre-school.

== Climate ==
Princetown, like the rest of Dartmoor, experiences colder and wetter weather than most of Devon, especially because of its high altitude. Snow is uncommon but is usually heavy when it does fall. According to the Köppen climate classification the climate would be classified as Cfb bordering on Cfc.

Climate data for Princetown, Elevation: 453 m (1,486 ft), 1981–2010 normals
Month	Jan	Feb	Mar	Apr	May	Jun	Jul	Aug	Sep	Oct	Nov	Dec	Year
Mean daily maximum °C (°F)	6.1 (43.0)	5.9 (42.6)	7.7 (45.9)	10.3 (50.5)	13.3 (55.9)	16.1 (61.0)	17.7 (63.9)	17.5 (63.5)	15.4 (59.7)	11.9 (53.4)	8.7 (47.7)	6.6 (43.9)	11.5 (52.7)
Daily mean °C (°F)	3.7 (38.7)	3.4 (38.1)	5.0 (41.0)	6.9 (44.4)	9.8 (49.6)	12.6 (54.7)	14.5 (58.1)	14.3 (57.7)	12.4 (54.3)	9.3 (48.7)	6.5 (43.7)	4.3 (39.7)	8.6 (47.4)
Mean daily minimum °C (°F)	1.2 (34.2)	0.8 (33.4)	2.2 (36.0)	3.4 (38.1)	6.2 (43.2)	9.0 (48.2)	11.2 (52.2)	11.1 (52.0)	9.3 (48.7)	6.6 (43.9)	4.2 (39.6)	1.9 (35.4)	5.6 (42.1)
Average precipitation mm (inches)	218.1 (8.59)	161.4 (6.35)	158.6 (6.24)	112.2 (4.42)	113.4 (4.46)	111.8 (4.40)	142.1 (5.59)	134.8 (5.31)	149.4 (5.88)	232.8 (9.17)	227.3 (8.95)	236.5 (9.31)	1,998.3 (78.67)
Average precipitation days (≥ 1.0 mm)	18.3	14.4	16.2	13.9	13.1	11.8	13.9	13.5	13.4	18.0	18.3	17.8	182.6
Source: Met Office

== Transport ==
A summer bus service, the Transmoor link (no. 82 bus) between Plymouth and Exeter, used to pass through the village but was axed, but in 2021 the Dartmoor Explorer started operation, running across the moor to Moretonhampstead and onwards to Exeter. There is a daytime service (no. 98 bus) linking Princetown to Yelverton and Tavistock, but only three times a day.
