= St Bridget's Church, Bridestowe =

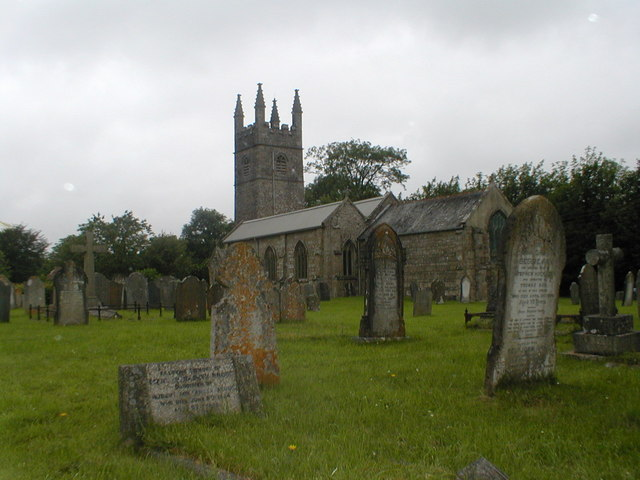
- St Bridget's Church, viewed from the churchyard

- 50.685426°N 4.105569°W
- OS grid reference: SX 51353 89430
- Country: England
- Denomination: Church of England
- Churchmanship: Central churchmanship
- Website: www.northmoorteam.org.uk/bridestowe-st-bridgets

History
- Status: Operational
- Dedication: Saint Bridget

Architecture
- Heritage designation: Grade II* listed
- Style: Perpendicular Gothic
- Years built: 13th & 15th century

Specifications
- Capacity: 150 seats
- Materials: Granite

Administration
- Province: Canterbury
- Diocese: Exeter
- Archdeaconry: Totnes
- Parish: Bridestowe

Clergy
- Vicar: Revd Adrian Brook

St Bridget's Church in Bridestowe, Devon, is a parish church in the Church of England and one of the central buildings in the rural area on the northwestern edge of Dartmoor. It is a Grade II* listed building of medieval construction with restorations made in the 19th century.

== Building ==
The church is mostly 13th and 15th century, with a west tower and some fragments of Norman work as well as Early English and Perpendicular styles. It is dedicated to the Irish Saint Brigid of Kildare, Irish Bríd, who is depicted in one of the stained glass windows, and from whom the name of the surrounding village is derived. The church's distinctive gateway is described in White's Directories as "a fine Norman arch supposed to be the remains of the original church". Restorations were carried out in circa 1820, 1866, and 1890.

== Memorials ==
On the north wall of the chancel is a 1665 memorial of 1665 to Lady Honor Fortescue Calmady, wife of Sir Shilston Calmady and mother of Josias Calmady. The churchyard contains the grave of Lieutenant Colonel Thomas Wollocombe (1814).

== Current day ==
Regular services are only held on Sunday mornings. A local flower festival is periodically held at the church.
