= Church of St Michael, Princetown =

Church in Princetown, Devon, England

Church of St Michael
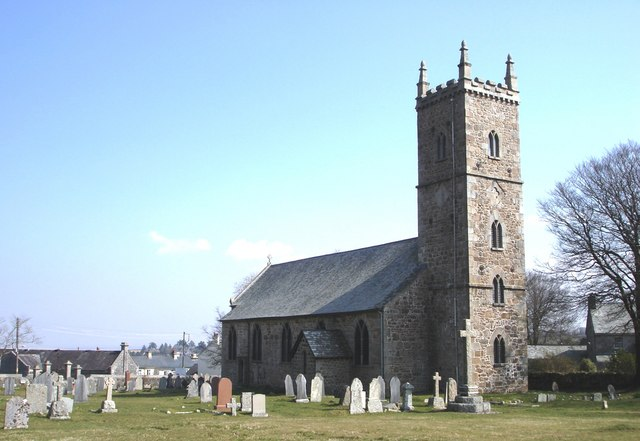

- Location within Devon
- 50°32′46″N 3°59′46″W
- Location: Princetown, Devon, England

History
- Built: 1810-1814

Site notes
- Architect(s): Daniel Alexander; Edmund Sedding (1898 restoration)

Listed Building – Grade II*
- Official name: Church of St Michael
- Designated: 21 March 1967
- Reference no.: 1105434

The Anglican Church of St Michael (sometimes known as St Michael and All Angels) in Princetown, Devon, England was built between 1810 and 1814. It is recorded in the National Heritage List for England as a designated Grade II* listed building, and is a redundant church in the care of the Churches Conservation Trust.

The granite church stands near the middle of Dartmoor, 436 metres (1,430 ft) above sea level in an exposed location close to Dartmoor Prison. Permission for the construction of the church was given 1812 by the Lord Commissioners of the Admiralty. The church was designed by the architect Daniel Alexander and built by prisoners from the Napoleonic Wars and finished by those captured during the American war who were held in the prison, and is the only church in England to have been built by prisoners of war.

The three stage west tower is surmounted by pinnacles. Prisoners of war were held in the prison until 1816 and then the church closed. It was reopened and reconsecrated in 1831. In 1868 the chancel was altered and between 1898 and 1901 further alterations and expansion were undertaken under the direction of Edmund Sedding. In 1915 the tower was restored.

The east window has stained glass by Mayer of Munich, which was installed in 1910 in memory of the American prisoners who helped to build the church. The graves of many prisoners are in the churchyard. The window was partially funded by a donation of £250, in 1908, from the National Society United States Daughters of 1812 as part of their work commemorating those who died in the War of 1812. The church was declared redundant on 1 November 1995, and was vested in the Trust on 8 January 2001. It is still consecrated and it is used occasionally for services.

== See also ==
- List of churches preserved by the Churches Conservation Trust in South West England
