= Tor Royal =

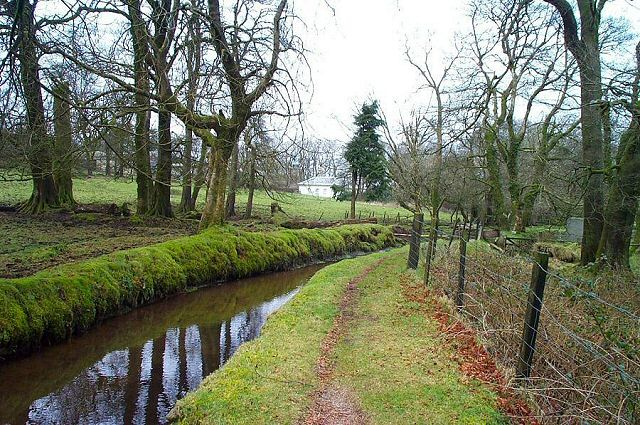

- Location within Devon

General information
- Type: Stone
- Location: Dartmoor, Devon, England
- Coordinates: 50.5412°N 3.9766°W
- Construction started: 1785-1793

Tor Royal is a Grade II* listed building near Princetown, Dartmoor, in the English county of Devon. Built between 1785 and 1793 by Sir Thomas Tyrwhitt, it was added to in c.1815–20, and restored by A. E. Richardson in 1912.

From the end of the 18th century there was much interest in enclosing and "improving" the open moorland on Dartmoor, and Tyrwhitt enthusiastically took part in this programme. In 1785 he bought over 2,000 acres (Note: Somers Cocks (1970) says 2,300, Milton (2006) says 2,500.) near one of the newly constructed turnpike roads across the moor and had an access road built to his estate, where he experimented with growing various crops, the most successful of which was flax.

According to the listing text at British Listed Buildings, the interest of this house lies "not only in the quality of its interior and its unaltered nature, but also in its historical importance to Princetown and its royal connections." Tyrwhitt instigated the building of both Dartmoor Prison (1809) and the Plymouth and Dartmoor Railway (1823) which led to the development of Princetown as a town. Various members of the royal family visited and stayed at the house, Prince Albert in August 1846, for example.
