= Grade I listed buildings in West Devon =

There are over 9,000 Grade I listed buildings in England. This page is a list of these buildings in the district of West Devon in Devon.

== West Devon ==
Name	Location	Type	Completed (Note: The date given is the date used by Historic England as significant for the initial building or that of an important part in the structure's description.)	Date designated	Grid ref. (Note: The grid reference is based on the British national grid reference system, sometimes known as OSGB36, used by the Ordnance Survey.) Geo-coordinates	Entry number (Note: The "List Entry Number" is a unique number assigned to each listed building and scheduled monument by Historic England.)	Image
Church of St Andrew	Bere Ferrers, West Devon	Parish Church	no later than early 14th century	21 March 1967	SX4593563413; 50°27′01″N 4°10′17″W	1163103	Church of St Andrew More images
Church of St James	Bondleigh, West Devon	Church	Dated 1706	22 February 1967	SS6511504840; 50°49′38″N 3°55′00″W	1326420	Church of St James More images
Bradstone Manor Gatehouse and Flanking Walls	Bradstone, West Devon	Wall	circa late 16th century	21 March 1967	SX3816980885; 50°36′19″N 4°17′18″W	1104827	Bradstone Manor Gatehouse and Flanking Walls More images
Church of St Nonna	Bradstone, West Devon	Parish Church	circa 12th century origins	21 March 1967	SX3812380899; 50°36′19″N 4°17′20″W	1326684	Church of St Nonna More images
Greystone Bridge	Bradstone, West Devon	Road Bridge	1439	21 March 1967	SX3684680344; 50°36′00″N 4°18′24″W	1104822	Greystone Bridge More images
Church of St Mary	Bratton Clovelly, West Devon	Parish Church	Early 14th century	22 February 1967	SX4636091821; 50°42′20″N 4°10′38″W	1326312	Church of St Mary More images
Church of St Michael De Rupe	Brent Tor, West Devon	Sundial	dated 1642	21 March 1967	SX4707780403; 50°36′12″N 4°09′44″W	1104836	Church of St Michael De Rupe More images
Church of All Hallows	Broadwoodkelly, West Devon	Church	18th century	22 February 1967	SS6174805860; 50°50′09″N 3°57′53″W	1146659	Church of All Hallows More images
Buckland Abbey	Buckland Monachorum, West Devon	Abbey	founded 1278	14 June 1952	SX4872566783; 50°28′53″N 4°08′01″W	1163369	Buckland Abbey More images
Church of St Andrew	Buckland Monachorum, West Devon	Parish Church	later 15th century	21 March 1967	SX4902268334; 50°29′43″N 4°07′48″W	1326380	Church of St Andrew More images
Tithe Barn Directly to East of Buckland Abbey	Buckland Monachorum, West Devon	Tithe Barn	15th century	14 June 1952	SX4876766778; 50°28′53″N 4°07′59″W	1105493	Tithe Barn Directly to East of Buckland Abbey More images
Church of St Michael	Chagford, West Devon	Church	15th century	22 February 1967	SX7014687508; 50°40′22″N 3°50′21″W	1308610	Church of St Michael More images
Hole Farmhouse Including Garden Walls and Mounting Block Adjoining to North	Chagford, West Devon	Farmhouse	C20	20 February 1952	SX6850786098; 50°39′35″N 3°51′42″W	1106187	Hole Farmhouse Including Garden Walls and Mounting Block Adjoining to North More images
Castle Drogo	Drewsteignton, West Devon	Country House	1911-1930	20 February 1952	SX7218490038; 50°41′45″N 3°48′40″W	1106086	Castle Drogo More images
Church of the Holy Trinity	Drewsteignton, West Devon	Parish Church	15th century and early 16th century	22 February 1967	SX7363790849; 50°42′13″N 3°47′27″W	1106073	Church of the Holy Trinity More images
Church of All Saints	Dunterton, West Devon	Stocks	circa 1460s	21 March 1967	SX3758379293; 50°35′27″N 4°17′45″W	1163426	Church of All Saints More images
Church of the Holy Trinity	Gidleigh, West Devon	Parish Church	Saxon or Norman	22 February 1967	SX6706288383; 50°40′48″N 3°52′59″W	1106128	Church of the Holy Trinity More images
Gidleigh Castle	Gidleigh, West Devon	Tower Keep	13th century	22 February 1967	SX6703788426; 50°40′49″N 3°53′00″W	1308353	Gidleigh Castle More images
Morwell Barton	Gulworthy, West Devon	House	Late 12th century	14 June 1952	SX4456570790; 50°30′58″N 4°11′38″W	1105738	Upload Photo
New Bridge	Gulworthy, West Devon	Bridge	c. 1520	21 March 1967	SX4332172209; 50°31′43″N 4°12′43″W	1172383	New Bridge More images
Church of St John the Baptist	Hatherleigh, West Devon	Parish Church	late 15th century and early 16th century	22 February 1967	SS5411004599; 50°49′21″N 4°04′21″W	1105250	Church of St John the Baptist More images
Horrabridge Bridge	Horrabridge, West Devon	Bridge	c. 1400	14 June 1952	SX5132769926; 50°30′37″N 4°05′53″W	1105769	Horrabridge Bridge More images
Church of St James	Iddesleigh, West Devon	Parish Church	13th century	22 February 1967	SS5690008226; 50°51′21″N 4°02′04″W	1309051	Church of St James More images
Kelly House	Kelly, West Devon	House	16th century	14 June 1952	SX3944681394; 50°36′36″N 4°16′14″W	1318194	Kelly House More images
Parish Church of St Mary	Kelly, West Devon	Parish Church	14th century	21 March 1967	SX3951481400; 50°36′37″N 4°16′10″W	1104815	Parish Church of St Mary More images
Collacombe Manor	Lamerton, West Devon	Cross Passage House	Pre Reformation	14 June 1952	SX4308676450; 50°34′00″N 4°13′01″W	1326224	Upload Photo
Parish Church of St Peter	Lewtrenchard, West Devon	Parish Church	Late 15th century	7 November 1985	SX4571786111; 50°39′15″N 4°11′02″W	1326326	Parish Church of St Peter More images
Church of St Mary	Lifton, West Devon	Parish Church	14th century	21 March 1967	SX3863485019; 50°38′33″N 4°17′01″W	1317823	Church of St Mary More images
Wortham	Lifton, West Devon	Cross Wing House	15th century	14 June 1952	SX3820186957; 50°39′35″N 4°17′26″W	1164234	Wortham More images
Church of St Mary	Mary Tavy, West Devon	Church	14th century	21 March 1967	SX5092378749; 50°35′22″N 4°06′27″W	1326217	Church of St Mary More images
Church of St Mary	Marystow, West Devon	Parish Church	12th century	21 March 1967	SX4346582862; 50°37′28″N 4°12′52″W	1326319	Church of St Mary More images
Sydenham House	Sydenham, Marystow, West Devon	House	Earlier	14 June 1952	SX4281383855; 50°37′59″N 4°13′26″W	1164731	Sydenham House More images
Church of St Peter	Meavy, West Devon	Parish Church	Norman	21 March 1967	SX5403767220; 50°29′12″N 4°03′32″W	1105442	Church of St Peter More images
Church of St Constantine	Milton Abbot, West Devon	Church	18th century	21 March 1967	SX4072579281; 50°35′29″N 4°15′06″W	1326349	Church of St Constantine More images
Endsleigh House, Including Terrace Wall to the South East and Wall to the North East	Endsleigh, Milton Abbot, West Devon	House	Designed 1810	21 March 1967	SX3910978596; 50°35′06″N 4°16′27″W	1317513	Endsleigh House, Including Terrace Wall to the South East and Wall to the North East More images
Retaining Wall to the Raised Garden to the South West of Endsleigh House	Endsleigh, Milton Abbot, West Devon	Garden Wall	c. 1810	7 November 1985	SX3907678597; 50°35′06″N 4°16′28″W	1326345	Upload Photo
Rockery and Grotto, Endsleigh Gardens	Endsleigh, Milton Abbot, West Devon	Grotto	c. 1810	7 November 1985	SX3904378669; 50°35′08″N 4°16′30″W	1165212	Upload Photo
Stables to the North of Endsleigh House	Endsleigh, Milton Abbot, West Devon	House	designed circa 1810	6 October 1982	SX3910278633; 50°35′07″N 4°16′27″W	1165172	Upload Photo
The Salmon Larder and Ice House, Endsleigh Gardens	Endsleigh, Milton Abbot, West Devon	Dairy	c. 1814	6 October 1982	SX3894978671; 50°35′08″N 4°16′35″W	1105548	The Salmon Larder and Ice House, Endsleigh Gardens More images
The Shell House and Grotto, Endsleigh Gardens	Endsleigh, Milton Abbot, West Devon	Wall	c. 1810	6 October 1982	SX3924278453; 50°35′01″N 4°16′20″W	1326346	The Shell House and Grotto, Endsleigh Gardens
The Swiss Cottage, Endsleigh Gardens	Endsleigh, Milton Abbot, West Devon	House	late C20	19 October 1978	SX3952578018; 50°34′47″N 4°16′05″W	1105549	The Swiss Cottage, Endsleigh Gardens More images
Church of St Peter	North Tawton, West Devon	Parish Church	13th century	22 February 1967	SS6644901722; 50°47′59″N 3°53′47″W	1146842	Church of St Peter More images
Church of St Thomas of Canterbury	Northlew, West Devon	Parish Church	Norman	22 February 1967	SX5050299173; 50°46′22″N 4°07′18″W	1147443	Church of St Thomas of Canterbury More images
Okehampton Castle	Okehampton Hamlets, West Devon	Bailey	13th century	7 September 1987	SX5834294249; 50°43′50″N 4°00′31″W	1165647	Okehampton Castle More images
Church of St Peter	Peter Tavy, West Devon	Parish Church	14th century	21 March 1967	SX5131377773; 50°34′51″N 4°06′05″W	1105400	Church of St Peter More images
Church of St Andrew	Sampford Courtenay, West Devon	Parish Church	15th century	22 February 1967	SS6324101267; 50°47′41″N 3°56′31″W	1105290	Church of St Andrew More images
Church of St Mary	Honeychurch, Sampford Courtenay, West Devon	Gate	19th century	22 February 1967	SS6291302816; 50°48′31″N 3°56′49″W	1105288	Church of St Mary More images
Church of St Mary	Sampford Spiney, West Devon	Parish Church	Late C13/Early 14th century	21 March 1967	SX5342672471; 50°32′01″N 4°04′10″W	1326222	Church of St Mary More images
Church (dedication Unknown)	Sheepstor, West Devon	Parish Church	Late 15th century	21 March 1967	SX5601267653; 50°29′27″N 4°01′52″W	1171232	Church (dedication Unknown) More images
Church of St Andrew	South Tawton, West Devon	Parish Church	15th century	22 February 1967	SX6530794482; 50°44′03″N 3°54′36″W	1106035	Church of St Andrew More images
North Wyke	South Tawton, West Devon	Country House	15th century	20 February 1952	SX6602198379; 50°46′10″N 3°54′05″W	1170345	North Wyke More images
Church of St John the Baptist	Stowford, West Devon	Parish Church	14th century	21 March 1967	SX4326987021; 50°39′42″N 4°13′08″W	1105532	Church of St John the Baptist More images
Horse Bridge	Horsebridge, Sydenham Damerel, West Devon	Road Bridge	Early 15th century	14 June 1952	SX4001274876; 50°33′06″N 4°15′35″W	1165822	Horse Bridge More images
Abbey Gatehouse	Tavistock, West Devon	Library	1829	7 September 1951	SX4820174422; 50°32′59″N 4°08′39″W	1105833	Abbey Gatehouse More images
Betsy Grimbal's Tower, the Vicarage	Tavistock, West Devon	Tower	15th century	7 September 1951	SX4811574330; 50°32′56″N 4°08′43″W	1326209	Betsy Grimbal's Tower, the Vicarage More images
Church of St Andrew	Tavistock, West Devon	Church	Norman	7 September 1951	SX4929672697; 50°32′04″N 4°07′40″W	1326196	Church of St Andrew More images
Porch to Abbot's Hall in Grounds of Bedford Hotel	Tavistock, West Devon	Tower	late 15th century or early 16th century	7 September 1951	SX4816374351; 50°32′57″N 4°08′40″W	1105820	Porch to Abbot's Hall in Grounds of Bedford Hotel More images
Remains of North-west Corner of Abbey Cloister and Church Wall in St Eustachius' Churchyard	Tavistock, West Devon	Wall	13th century	7 September 1951	SX4812974386; 50°32′58″N 4°08′42″W	1162792	Remains of North-west Corner of Abbey Cloister and Church Wall in St Eustachius' Churchyard More images
Church of St Mary the Virgin	Throwleigh, West Devon	Parish Church	late 13th century - early 14th century	22 February 1967	SX6677190775; 50°42′05″N 3°53′17″W	1168195	Church of St Mary the Virgin More images
Higher Shilstone Farmhouse Including Stables and Garden Walls Adjoining to South	Throwleigh, West Devon	Dairy	Late 17th century	20 February 1952	SX6602590085; 50°41′42″N 3°53′54″W	1307205	Upload Photo
Church of St George	Thrushelton, West Devon	Parish Church	13th century	21 March 1967	SX4473787609; 50°40′03″N 4°11′54″W	1105510	Church of St George More images
Church of St Mary	Walkhampton, West Devon	Parish Church	Pre 15th century	21 March 1967	SX5366270150; 50°30′46″N 4°03′55″W	1105371	Church of St Mary More images
Walreddon Manor	Whitchurch, West Devon	House	Early/Mid 17th century	21 March 1967	SX4775871315; 50°31′18″N 4°08′56″W	1105714	Upload Photo
