= Lifton Hundred =

Ancient administrative unit of Devon, England

Lifton Hundred was the name of one of thirty two ancient administrative units of Devon, England.

The parishes in the hundred were:

Bradstone, Bratton Clovelly, Bridestowe, Broadwoodwidger, Coryton, Dunterton, Germansweek, Kelly, Lamerton, Lew Trenchard, Lifton, Lydford, Mary Tavy, Marystowe, Okehampton, Sourton, Stowford, Sydenham Damerel, Thrushelton and Virginstow

White's History, Gazetteer, and Directory of Devonshire, (1850) describes the Lifton Hundred as ""On the western side of Devon, extends over about 140,000 acres of land, more than a third of which is in the wild and hilly district of Dartmoor Forest. . . The forest portion extends about 16 miles from north to south, and from 4 to 6 in breadth, extending westward to the river Tamar, on the borders of Cornwall; northward to Okehampton, and southward to the vicinity of Tavistock. It gives rise to many rivers and brooks, and is in the Southern Parliamentary Division of Devon; in Tavistock and Okehampton Polling Districts; in Lifton and Tavistock Petty Sessional Divisions; in the Archdeaconry of Totnes; and mostly in the Deanery of Tavistock, and partly that of Okehampton."

== See also ==
- List of hundreds of England and Wales – Devon
