= Wolf River =

Wolf River may refer to:

== Rivers ==
=== Canada ===
- Wolf River (Alberta), a tributary of the Sand River
- Wolf River (British Columbia), on Vancouver Island, British Columbia
- Wolf River (Manitoba), a tributary of the Hayes River in northern Manitoba
- Wolf River (Nunavut), on Axel Heiberg Island
- Ontario
  - Wolf River (Parry Sound District), a tributary of the Pickerel River
  - Wolf River (Sudbury District), a tributary of the Wolseley River
  - Wolf River (Thunder Bay District), a tributary of Lake Superior
- Wolf River (Yukon), a tributary of the Nisutlin River

=== New Zealand ===
- Wolff River, in Fiordland

=== United States ===
- Wolf River (Kansas) in Kansas
- Wolf River (Mississippi) in southern Mississippi, which empties into Bay St. Louis
- Tennessee
  - Wolf River (Tennessee), in western Tennessee
    - Wolf River Conservancy, advocates of the river
  - Wolf River (Middle Tennessee), in middle Tennessee
- Wisconsin
  - Wolf River (Fox River tributary), a Fox River tributary
  - Wolf River (Eau Claire River), a North Fork Eau Claire River tributary

== Towns ==
- Wolf River, Langlade County, Wisconsin, United States
- Wolf River, Winnebago County, Wisconsin, United States

== Other uses ==
- Wolf River (apple), an apple cultivar

== See also ==
- River Wolf, a river in Devon, England
- River Wolf (disambiguation)
