= Lifton =

Lifton may refer to:

- Lifton, Devon, a village in England
- Lifton Hundred, an ancient administrative unit
- Lifton railway station
- Barbara Lifton (born 1950), American politician
- David Lifton (1939–2022), American author
- Jimmy Lifton (born 1955), American musician and film producer
- Richard P. Lifton (born 1953), American biochemist
- Robert Jay Lifton (1926–2025), American psychiatrist and author
