= Thrushelton =

Village in Devon, England

Coordinates: 50.667296°N 4.1973072°W

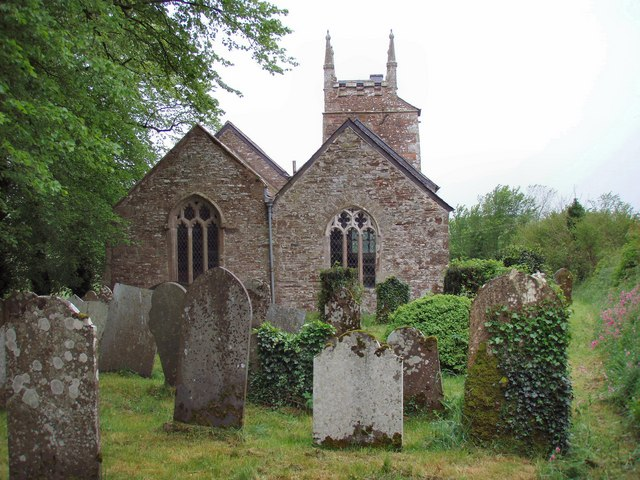

- Location within Devon
- Area: 16.5241 km^{2} (6.3800 sq mi)
- Population: 197 (2011 census)
  - Density: 12/km^{2} (31/sq mi)
- Civil parish: Thrushelton
- District: West Devon
- Shire county: Devon
- Region: South West
- Country: England
- Sovereign state: United Kingdom
- Police: Devon and Cornwall
- Fire: Devon and Somerset
- Ambulance: South Western

Thrushelton or Thruselton is a village and civil parish about 2 and a half miles north of Coryton railway station, in the West Devon district, in the county of Devon, England. In 2011 the parish had a population of 197. The parish touches Bratton Clovelly, Bridestowe, Lewtrenchard, Stowford, Broadwoodwidger, Marystow and Germansweek.

== Features ==
There are 22 listed buildings in Thrushelton.

== History ==
Thrushelton was recorded in the Domesday Book as Tresetone. The name "Thrushelton" means 'Thrush farm/settlement'. The parish was historically in the Lifton hundred. On the 25th of March 1885 Wortham, Orchard, and Kilson Houses was transferred from Lewtrenchard parish to Thrushelton parish. The transferred area contained 3 houses in 1891.
