= John Harris (Bere Alston MP) =

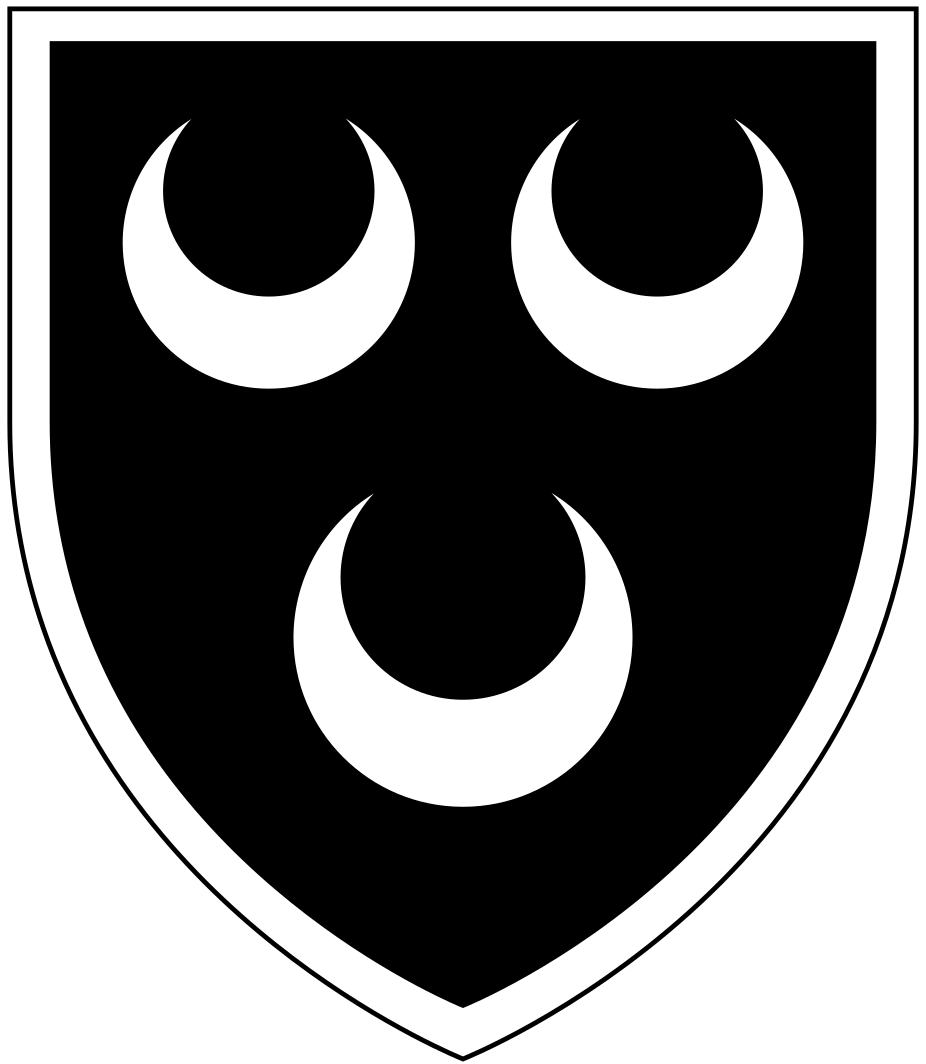
Arms of Harris of Hayne in the parish of Stowford, Devon: Sable, three crescents argent a bordure of the last These are the arms of Harris of Radford in the parish of Plymstock, Devon, the senior line of the family, differenced by a bordure

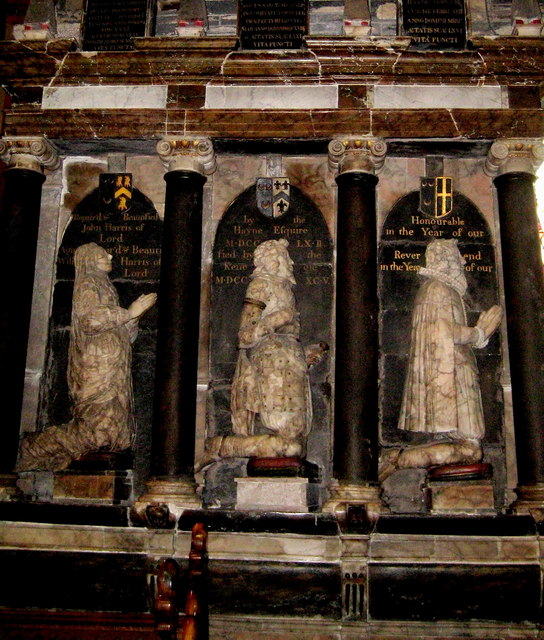
Monument in Lifton Church, Devon, to the Harris family of Hayne. The figure at far right is John Harris (1586-1656/7) of Hayne, MP. Above him are the arms of Harris impaling Mohun, for Cordelia Mohun, his second wife. At left is Florence Wyndham, his 1st wife, a daughter of Sir John Wyndham (1558–1645) of Orchard Wyndham in Somerset. Above her are the arms of Harris impaling Wyndham. In the centre is his father Arthur Harris (1561-1628) of Hayne, Sheriff of Cornwall in 1603 and Captain of St Michael's Mount in Cornwall. Above him are shown the arms of Harris impaling Davilles of Marland, Devon, for his wife Margaret Davilles

John Harris (c. 1586 – 6 March 1657) of Hayne in the parish of Stowford in Devon and of St. Michael's Mount in Cornwall, was a Member of Parliament.

== Origins ==
He was the eldest son and heir of Arthur Harris (1561–1628) of Hayne and of Kenegie, Gulval, Cornwall, Sheriff of Cornwall in 1603 and Captain of St Michael's Mount in Cornwall, by his wife Margaret Davilles daughter of John Davilles of Marland in the parish of Petrockstowe, Devon.

== Career ==
He matriculated at Exeter College, Oxford on 18 March 1603, aged 17 and was admitted at Lincoln's Inn on 10 February 1607, marked in the records as being "of Devon", when he commenced his training as a lawyer. Harris was elected as a Member of Parliament for Launceston, Cornwall, in 1621, for Bere Alston on 28 April 1640 (in the Short Parliament) and for Launceston again in 1641.

== Marriages and children ==
He married twice:

- Firstly to Florence Wyndham (1595–1630/1), a daughter of Sir John Wyndham (1558–1645) of Orchard Wyndham in the parish of Watchet, Somerset. She died aged 35 without children.
- Secondly to Cordelia Mohun, a daughter of John Mohun, 1st Baron Mohun of Okehampton, by whom he had children:
  - Sir Arthur Harris, 1st Baronet (c. 1650–1686) of Hayne, only son and heir, thrice a Member of Parliament for Okehampton in Devon.

== Death and burial ==
Harris died at Hayne at the age of 70 and was buried at Lifton, near Hayne, where survives his monumental brass. His elaborate monument survives in Lifton Church, showing three kneeling figures, himself at right, his first wife Florence Wyndham at left, his father in the centre.

Parliament of England
Vacant Parliament suspended since 1629	Member of Parliament for Bere Alston; 1640; With: William Strode	Succeeded by William Strode; Sir Thomas Cheek
