= Joseph Hunkin =

Joseph Hunkin may refer to:

- Joseph Hunkin (Governor of Scilly) (1610–1661), Governor of Scilly during the English Civil War
- Joseph Hunkin (bishop) (1887–1950), Bishop of Truro
