= Church of St Nonna =

Chucrch of St Nonna may refer to:

- Church of St Nonna, Altarnun. Cornwall
- Church of St Nonna, Bradstone, Devon
- Church of St Nonna, Caradon. Cornwall
