= River Wolf (disambiguation) =

River Wolf is a river in Devon, England.

River Wolf may also refer to:

- Giant otter (Pteronura brasiliensis), also known as the river wolf
- A number of rivers called Wolf River

== See also ==
- Mackenzie River wolf
