= River Thrushel =

River in Devon, England

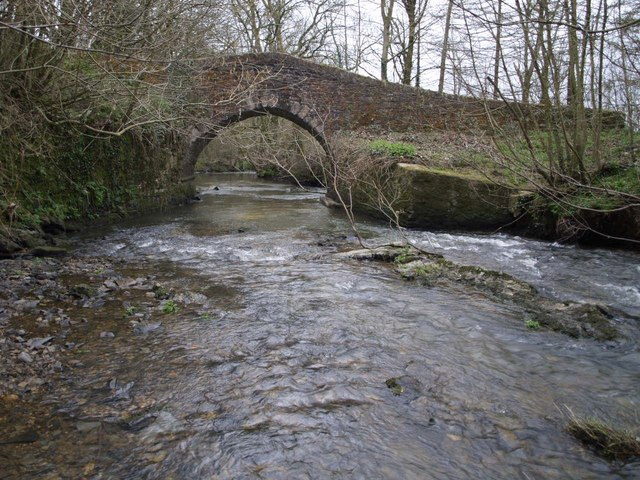
- The river at Stowford Bridge

- Location within Devon Location within the United Kingdom

Location
- Country: England
- County: Devon

Physical characteristics
- Source
  - location: Meldon
- Mouth: River Wolf
  - location: Tinhay
  - coordinates: 50°39′4.4″N 4°15′39.6″W

The River Thrushel is a river in Devon, England.

The Thrushel runs westerly from its source near Meldon to Tinhay, where it joins the River Wolf.

The river is marked as Tinhay River on Donn's map of 1765.
