= V. A. Holmes-Gore =

English clergyman (1909–1952)

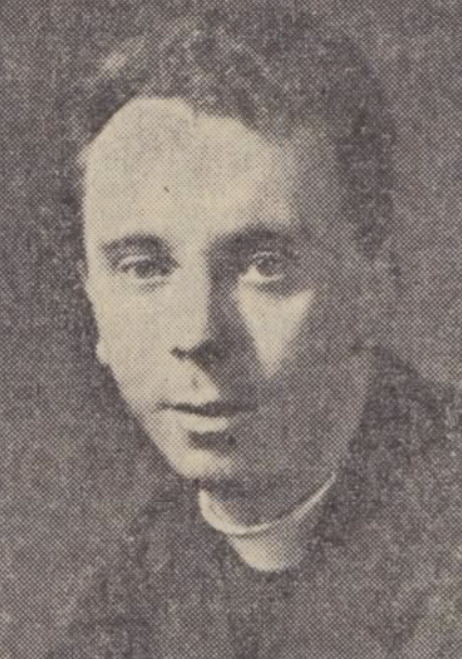
- Born: Vincent Arthur Holmes-Gore; 1909
- Died: 8 September 1952 (aged 43); Highbridge Station
- Occupation: Clergyman
- Spouse: Helen Evans (m. 1936)

Vincent Arthur Holmes-Gore (1909 – 8 September 1952) was an English clergyman and writer best known for his advocacy of Christian vegetarianism.

== Career ==
Holmes-Gore obtained a B.A. from Keble College, Oxford in 1931 and studied at Cuddesdon Theological College. He was ordained in 1933 at Exeter Cathedral as a deacon. He was curate at Totnes from 1933 to 1936 and at Crediton until 1941. In 1941 he became Rector of Doddiscombsleigh. He was chaplain of Eversley School in Lymington from 1945 to 1948. After 1948 he was assistant master at Millfield Preparatory School in Somerset.

== Beliefs ==
=== Marriage ===
Holmes-Gore defended the Christian idea of marriage and rejected Pauline ascetic pronouncements on marriage as non-Christian and Manichean. He believed that divorce was allowed in certain circumstances. His views on marriage are expressed in his book New Morals for Old, published in 1938.

=== Paul the Apostle ===
Holmes-Gore was highly critical of Paul the Apostle and his version of the Gospel which he regarded as harmful to Christianity. He was the author of Christ or Paul? which was described as an expansion of the work of the Tübingen School which highlighted a serious conflict of ideas between Paul and the other disciples of Jesus. Holmes-Gore argued that Paul's influence was responsible for many erroneous doctrines and that "the Church will have to make up its mind whether its teaching shall be based upon the Christianity of Christ or upon the Christianity of St. Paul".

=== Vegetarianism ===
Holmes-Gore advocated for animal rights and Christian vegetarianism. He was a speaker at meetings of the Gloucester Vegetarian Society. He authored an article in the autumn 1947 issue of The Vegetarian World Forum, "Was the Master a Vegetarian?" which argued that verses in the New Testament that mention meat were mistranslated from the original Greek. According to Holmes-Gore an accurate translation for the word meat meant "the act of eating food" and not the flesh of animals. He argued that Jesus was a vegetarian, commenting that "the idea of the blessed Master giving his sanction to the barbaric habit of flesh eating is a tragic delusion foisted upon the Church by those who never knew Him."

Holmes-Gore was an anti-vivisectionist. His quote "It is inconceivable that the cruelties of vivisection should be part of the Creator's plan for leading men to knowledge and to health" was cited on advertisements for the British Union for the Abolition of Vivisection.

== Personal life ==
Holmes-Gore was married and had no children. He resided at Edgarley Mews, Glastonbury. His father was G. Holmes-Gore, vicar of Broadwoodwidger.

== Death ==
Holmes-Gore had a nervous breakdown after resigning from his job due to ill health. He suffered from appendix trouble. Holmes-Gore committed suicide on 8 September 1952 by jumping in front of a train at Highbridge Station. He left £14,148 in his will.

== Selected publications ==
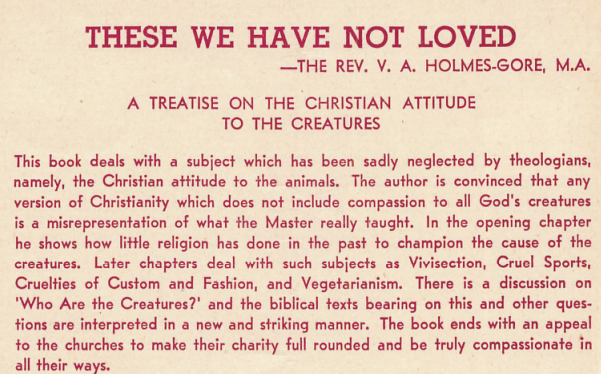
Advert for These We Have Not Loved, published in 1944

- Holmes-Gore, V. A. (1936). "The Thorn in the Flesh". Theology. 32 (188): 111–112. doi:10.1177/0040571X3603218808.
- New Morals for Old. Longmans Green and Co. 1938.
- The Human Soul. C. W. Daniel. 1943.
- Christ or Paul?. C. W. Daniel. 1946.
- The Bible and Vegetarianism and Was the Master a Vegetarian. The Vegetarian Book Club. 1964. [With Geoffrey L. Rudd]
- These We Have Not Loved: A Treatise on the Christian Attitude to the Creatures. C. W. Daniel. 1971. ISBN 978-0852070031. [First edition, published in 1941]
