= Roadford Lake =

Man-made lake in Devon, England

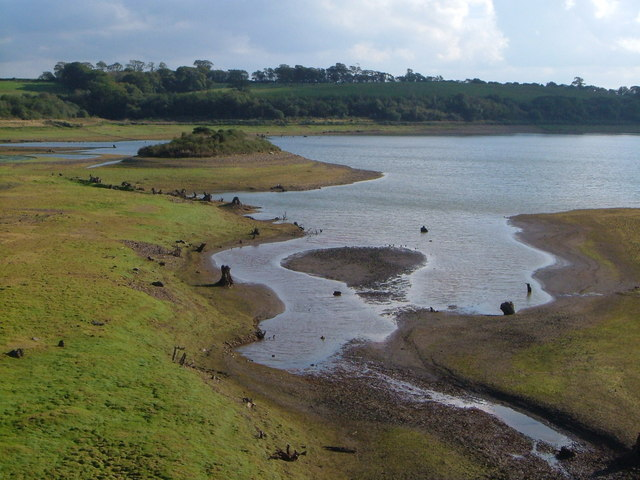
- The lake, at very low level, seen from a bridge across the river Wolf (as it enters the lake).

- Location within Devon
- Location: West Devon
- Coordinates: 50°42′0″N 4°13′45″W
- Type: reservoir
- Primary inflows: River Wolf
- Basin countries: United Kingdom
- Managing agency: South West Water
- Built: 1989
- Surface area: 295 ha (730 acres)
- Water volume: 34,500 Ml (7.6×10^{9} imp gal)

Roadford Lake, also known as Roadford Reservoir, is a man-made reservoir fed by the River Wolf. It is located to the north-east of Broadwoodwidger in West Devon, eight miles (13 km) east of Launceston and is the largest area of fresh water in the southwest of England. Operated by South West Water, it directly supplies water for North Devon. It also supplies Plymouth and southwest Devon via releases into the River Tamar for abstraction at Gunnislake. It is a Local Nature Reserve.

The creation of the reservoir in 1989 permitted extensive archaeological research to be undertaken in the valley of the River Wolf led by Professor Mick Aston of Bristol University and documented by the Channel Four documentary series Time Signs.

In 2008 South West Water received planning permission to build a 100-bed holiday village beside the lake.

== Facilities ==
- Brown Trout fishing
- Lakeside Cafe
- Activities:
  - Sailing
  - Rowing
  - Kayaking
  - Windsurfing
  - Canadian Canoes
  - High Ropes Course
  - Outdoor Archery Range
  - Indoor Climbing wall
  - Raft building
- Footpath walks through mature forests/woodland
- Cycleway through mature forests/woodland
- Adjacent campsite

The facilities are managed by South West Lakes Trust, a registered charity.

== Incidents ==
On 9 June 2022, two people died when the motorboat they were travelling in capsized on the lake.
