= Joseph Hunkin (governor of Scilly) =

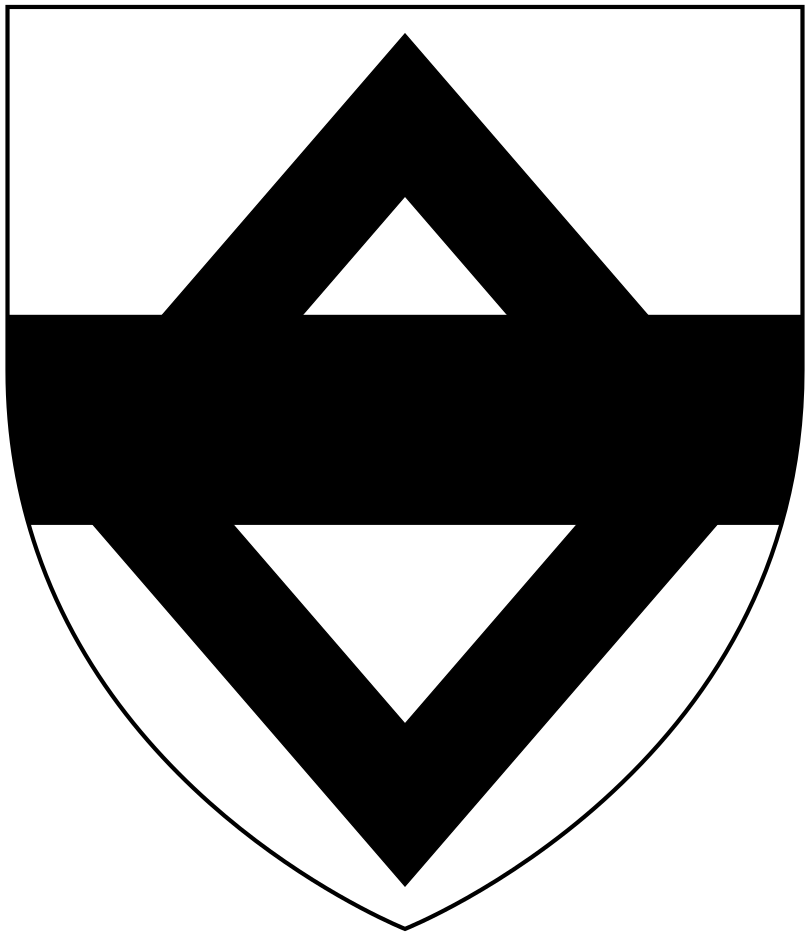
Arms of Hunkin: Argent, a mascle sable over all a fess of the last

Joseph Hunkin (1610–1661) of Gatherleigh in the parish of Lifton in Devon, was Governor of Scilly between 1651 and 1660, during Parliamentary control in the Civil War.

== Origins ==
He was the son and heir of John Hunkin (d.1629) of Gatherleigh, High Steward of the Borough of Liskeard in Cornwall (son of John Hunkin (d.1608) first Mayor of Liskeard elected on the re-incorporation of that Borough on 6 July 1587) by his first wife Grace Clobery, a daughter of Andrew Clobery (d.1596/7) of Lifton in Devon, 2nd son of John Clobery of Bradstone, Devon, near the Cornish border.

== Career ==
He was Governor during the construction of Cromwell's Castle, an artillery fort overlooking New Grimsby harbour on the island of Tresco in the Isles of Scilly. According to the Acts and Ordinances of the Interregnum 1642–1660 he was a commissioner for Devonshire for December 1649, December 1652 and June 1657.

== Marriage ==
In 1630 at Boyton, he married Frances Loveys (d.1657), a daughter of Robert Loveys of Beardon in Cornwall. Her mural monument, a simple slate tablet, survives on the external wall of Old Town Church, St Mary's, Isles of Scilly, inscribed as follows:

"To the memory of Francys, the wife of Joseph Hunkyn of Gatherly in the parish of Lifton in Devon, Governour of the Iland of Silly. She was the daughter of Robert Lovyes of Beardon in the parish of Boydon in Cornwall Esqu. She dyed the 30 day of March 1657 about the 46 (?) yeer of her age. Blest Soul thy race is run whilst we behind Strive for that crown WCH thou prepar'd didst find By Christ for thee, here shall thy body rest Till with thy soul it be for ever blest".

== Death and burial ==
He was buried on 15 August 1661 at Lifton in Devon. A later prominent member of the Hunkin family was Joseph Hunkin (1887-1950), born in Truro, Cornwall, the 8th Bishop of Truro from 1935 to 1950. His monument in Truro Cathedral displays the arms of Hunkin of Gatherleigh, namely: Argent, a mascle sable over all a fess of the last.
