= St Peter's Church, Lewtrenchard =

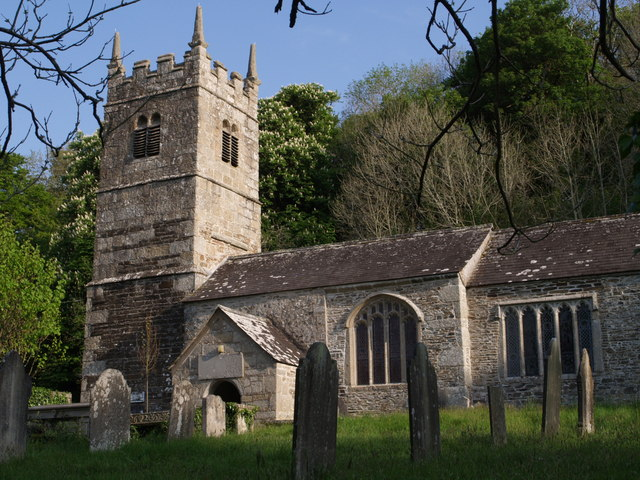
- St Peter's Church, Lewtrenchard

- Location within Devon
- 50.65420°N 4.18394°W
- OS grid reference: SX 45717 86111
- Location: Lewtrenchard
- Country: England
- Denomination: Church of England

History
- Dedication: Saint Peter

Architecture
- Heritage designation: Grade I listed
- Designated: 7 November 1985
- Style: Gothic

Administration
- Province: Canterbury
- Diocese: Exeter
- Archdeaconry: Plymouth
- Deanery: Tavistock
- Parish: Lewtrenchard

Clergy
- Vicar: Reverend Philip Conway

St Peter's Church, Lewtrenchard is a Grade I listed parish church in the Church of England Diocese of Exeter in Lewtrenchard, Devon.

The renowned antiquarian Sabine Baring-Gould was the local squire and the rector between 1881 and 1924.

== History ==
The original church on the site was dedicated to Saint Petroc, but no trace of this church remains. The surviving church's west wall contains remnants of a 1261 construction, but the rest of the church was rebuilt in Perpendicular Gothic style in 1520.

Sabine Baring-Gould inherited the manor of Lewtrenchard in 1872. When the living became vacant in 1881, he appointed himself as the parson. He carrief out extensive restorations of the church over the remainder of his life.

== Architecture ==
The church is built of stone rubble with a slate roof and Dartmoor 'broad and narrow' quoins.

The church is largely of late 15th century and early 16th century construction, with considerable rebuilding and restoration, especially by Sabine Baring-Gould, whose noted criticisms of most contemporary restoration make his work at his own church of especial interest.

Baring-Gould installed various church furnishings he collected from his travels across Europe.

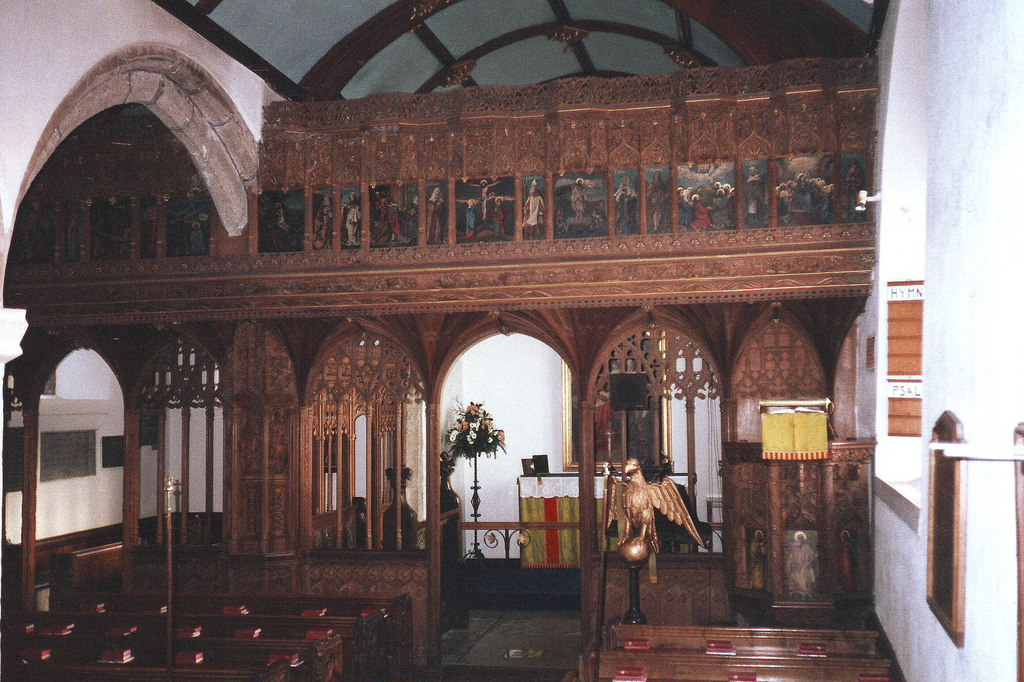
The rood screen at St Peter's Church, Lewtrenchard

The pulpit and the rood screen in the church were carved by the Pinwill sisters.

A 21st century extension was built by the church to provide a meeting room, a vestry, and a kitchen.

== Memorials ==
There are monuments to Sabine Baring-Gould and his wife Grace in the churchyard.

== Current day ==
The church is part of the benefice of Lifton.

Events are sometimes organised in the church by the Lewtrenchard Women's Institute.
