= River Wolf =

River in west Devon, England

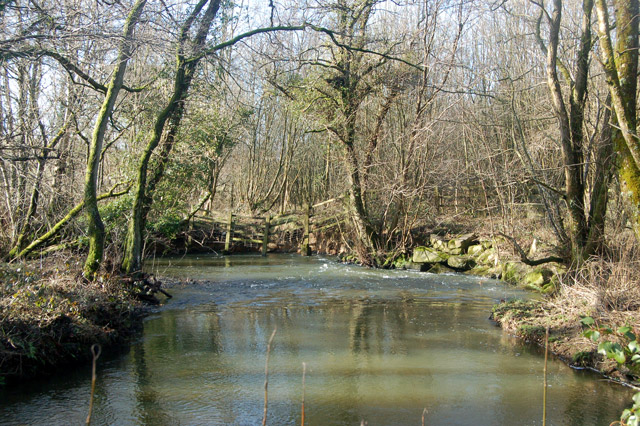
- The River Wolf near Broadwoodwidger

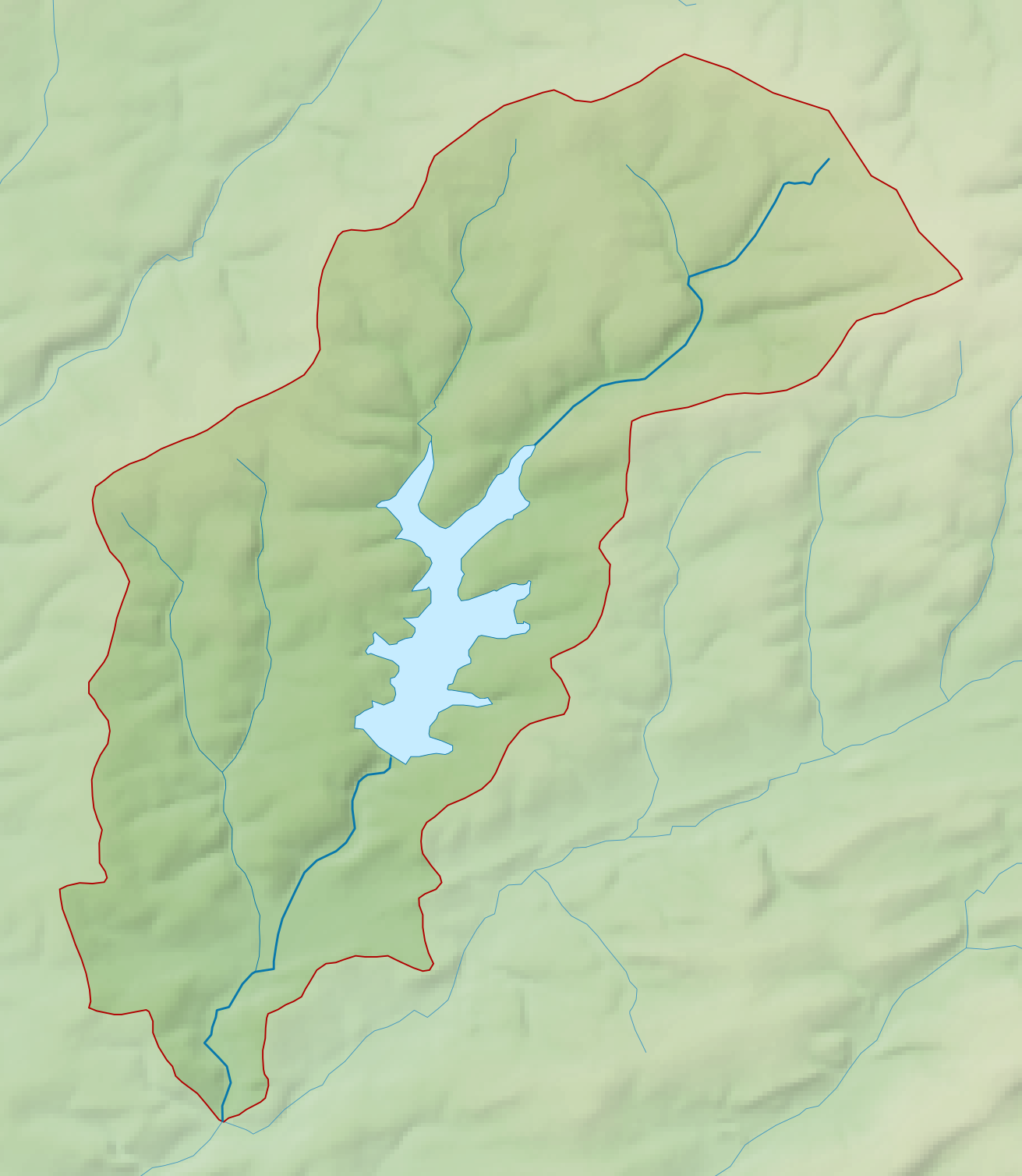
- Catchment of the River Wolf

Location
- Country: England
- County: Devon

Physical characteristics
- Mouth
  - location: River Thrushel
  - coordinates: 50.6512°N 4.2610°W

The River Wolf is a minor river in the west of the county of Devon in England. Its name may come from a Celtic or earlier name recorded by the Roman map-maker Ptolemy (Ptolemy II 3 13) as Ουολιβα (Voliba) as a town of the Dumnonii (it may be Broadbury Castle); rather than referring to the wolf animal.

The river runs from Broadbury through the valley below Germansweek and empties into Roadford Lake, a man-made reservoir built in 1989. In July 2006 some 100 million litres of water were released from the lake to help the survival of salmon in the river during a prolonged period of drought.

After Roadford Lake the river continues through Slew Woods below the village of Broadwoodwidger. It then continues in a southerly direction eventually merging with the River Thrushel just north of Tinhay and then joins the River Lyd at Lifton. The River Lyd eventually joins the River Tamar at the Devon/Cornwall border just east of Launceston.

The United Kingdom's environmental organisation Natural England currently runs a grant scheme called Catchment-sensitive farming. The River Wolf is included within one of the priority catchments targeted in this scheme
