= Epitaph =

Inscription on a tombstone

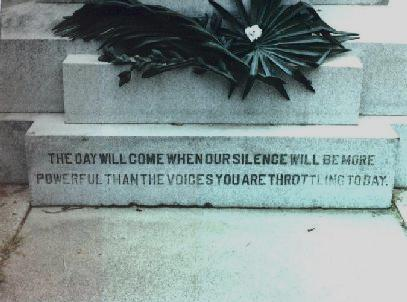
Epitaph on the base of the Haymarket Martyrs' Monument, Waldheim Cemetery, Forest Park, Illinois

An epitaph (from Ancient Greek ἐπιτάφιος (epitáphios) 'a funeral oration'; from ἐπι- (epi-) 'at, over' and τάφος (táphos) 'tomb') is a short text honoring a deceased person. Strictly speaking, it refers to text that is inscribed on a tombstone or plaque, but it may also be used in a figurative sense. Some epitaphs are specified by the person themselves before their death, while others are chosen by those responsible for the burial. An epitaph may be written in prose or in verse.

Most epitaphs are brief records of the family, and perhaps the career, of the deceased, often with a common expression of love or respect—for example, "beloved father of ..."—but others are more ambitious. From the Renaissance to the 19th century in Western culture, epitaphs for notable people became increasingly lengthy and pompous descriptions of their family origins, career, virtues and immediate family, often in Latin. Notably, the Laudatio Turiae, the longest known Ancient Roman epitaph, exceeds almost all of these at 180 lines; it celebrates the virtues of an honored wife (sometimes identified, but not generally accepted, as Turia, the Wife of consul Quintus Lucretius Vespillo).

Some are quotes from holy texts, or aphorisms. One approach of many epitaphs is to "speak" to the reader and warn them about their own mortality. A wry trick of others is to request the reader to get off their resting place, inasmuch as the reader would have to be standing on the ground above the coffin to read the inscription. Some record achievements (e.g., past politicians note the years of their terms of office). Nearly all (excepting those where this is impossible by definition, such as the Tomb of the Unknown Soldier) note name, year or date of birth, and date of death. Many list family members and the relationship of the deceased to them (for example, "Father / Mother / Son / Daughter of").

== Linguistic distinctions ==
In English, and in accordance with the word's etymology, the word "epitaph" refers to a textual commemoration of a person, which may or may not be inscribed on a monument. In many European languages, however, the meaning of the word (or its close equivalent) has broadened to mean the monument itself, specifically a mural monument or plaque erected in a church, often close to, but not directly over, a person's place of burial. Examples include German Epitaph; Dutch epitaaf; Hungarian epitáfium; Polish epitafium; Danish epitafium; Swedish epitafium; and Estonian epitaaf.

== History ==
The history of epitaphs extends as far back as the ancient Egyptians and have differed in delivery. The ancient Greeks utilised emotive expression, written in elegiac verse, later in prose. Ancient Romans' use of epitaphs was more blunt and uniform, typically detailing facts of the deceased – as did the earliest epitaphs in English churches. "May the earth lie light upon thee" was a common inscription for them. Due to the influence of Roman occupiers, the dominant language of epitaphs was Latin, evidenced by the oldest existing epitaphs in Britain. French and English came into fashion around the 13th and 14th centuries, respectively.

By the 16th century, epitaphs had become more literary in nature and those written in verse were involved in trade. In America and Britain, comedic epitaphs are common in the form of acrostics, palindromes, riddles, and puns on names and professions – Robert Burns, the most prolific pre-Romantic epitaphist, wrote 35 pieces, them being largely satirical. The rate of literary epitaphs has been historically overshadowed by "popular sepulchral inscriptions which are produced in countless numbers at all time"; "strictly literary" epitaphs were most present during the start of the Romantic period.

The Lake Poets have been credited with providing success to epitaph-writing adjacent to that of poetry significance – Robert Southey, in focusing simultaneously upon transience and eternity, contributed substantially. General interest for epitaphs was waning at the cusp of the 19th century, in contrast to a considerable burgeoning intellectual interest. Critical essays had been published before on the matter, possibly contributing towards its flourishing in the latter half of the 18th century. Epitaphs never became a major poetic form and, according to Romantic scholar Ernest Bernhardt-Kabisch, they had "virtually disappeared" by 1810. "The art of the epitaph was largely lost in the 20th century", wrote the Encyclopedia Britannica.

=== Format ===
Sarcophagi and coffins were the choice of ancient Egyptians for epitaphs; brasses was the prominent format for a significant period of time. Epitaphs upon stone monuments became a common feature by the Elizabethan era.

== In England ==
=== Medieval era ===
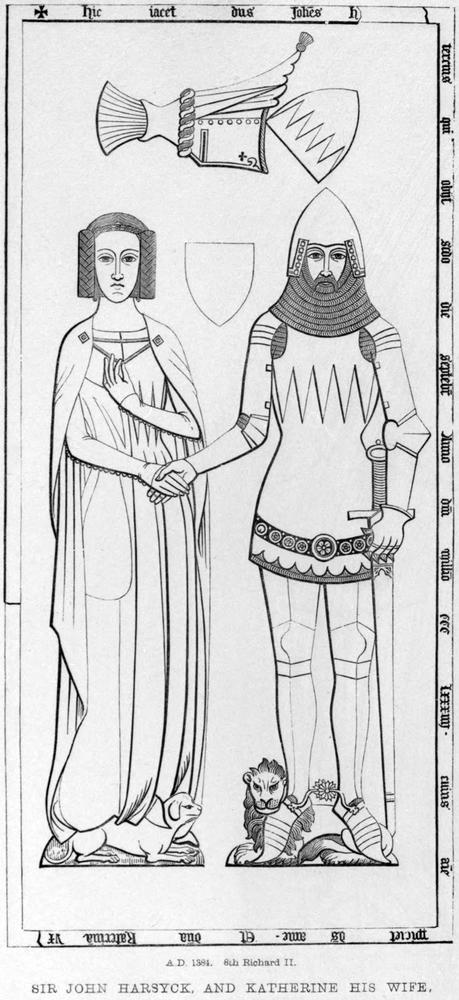
Ledger stone with epitaph in ledger lines of Sir John Harsyck (d. 1384), South Acre Church, Norfolk

Stock phrases or standard elements present in epitaphs on mediaeval church monuments and ledger stones in England include:

- Hic jacet.. (here lies...)
- ... cuius animae propitietur deus amen (generally abbreviated to cuius aie ppitiet ds ame with tildes indicating the omitted letters) ("whose soul may God look upon with favour Amen")
- Memoriae sacrum ... / MS ("Sacred to the memory (of) ...")

=== Modern era ===
- Requiescat in pace / RIP ("may he rest in peace")

== In music ==
In a more figurative sense, the term may be used for music composed in memory of the deceased. Igor Stravinsky composed in 1958 Epitaphium for flute, clarinet and harp. In 1967 Krzysztof Meyer called his Symphony No. 2 for choir and orchestra Epitaphium Stanisław Wiechowicz in memoriam. Jeffrey Lewis composed Epitaphium – Children of the Sun for narrator, chamber choir, piano, flute, clarinet and percussion. In 1969, King Crimson released the song Epitaph, giving a reference to epitaphs within the song. Independent record label Epitaph Records also took its name from the song. Bronius Kutavičius composed in 1998 Epitaphium temporum pereunti. Valentin Silvestrov composed in 1999 Epitaph L.B. (Епітафія Л.Б.) for viola (or cello) and piano. In 2007 Graham Waterhouse composed Epitaphium for string trio as a tribute to the memory of his father William Waterhouse. The South African poet Gert Vlok Nel wrote an (originally) untitled song, which appeared on his first music album Beaufort Wes se beautiful woorde as "Epitaph", because his producer Eckard Potgieter told him that the song sounded like an epitaph. David Bowie's final album, Blackstar, released in 2016, is generally seen as his musical epitaph, with singles "Blackstar" and "Lazarus" often singled out. In 2004, technical death metal band Necrophagist released an album titled Epitaph.

== See also ==
- Chronogram
- Cenotaph
- Death poem
- Epigraph
- Eulogy
- Epitaphios logos (ancient Greek funeral oration)
- The Epitaph Project
- Hero stone
- Seikilos epitaph

== Bibliography ==
- Bertrand, Régis (2005). "Que de vertus: Les épitaphes édifiantes des débuts du XIXe siècle". In Bertrand, Régis; Carol, Anne; Pelen, Jean-Noël (eds.). Les narrations de la mort. Aix-en-Provence: Publications de l'Université de Provence. pp. 241–255. ISBN 2853996131.
- Brandis, Veronika; Jong, Jan L. de; Seidel, Robert, eds. (2025). Funerary Inscriptions in Early Modern Europe: shaping identities to remember. Leiden: Brill. ISBN 978-90-04-71169-3.
- Guthke, Karl S. (2003). Epitaph Culture in the West: variations on a theme in cultural history. Lewiston, NY: Mellen. ISBN 0773467858.
- Scodel, Joshua (1991). The English Poetic Epitaph: commemoration and conflict from Jonson to Wordsworth. Ithaca, NY: Cornell University Press. ISBN 0801424828.
- Vidor, Gian Marco (2014). "Satisfying the mind and inflaming the heart: emotions and funerary epigraphy in nineteenth-century Italy". Mortality. 19 (4): 342–360. doi:10.1080/13576275.2014.921667. S2CID 144222277.
