= Holy Trinity Church, Gidleigh =

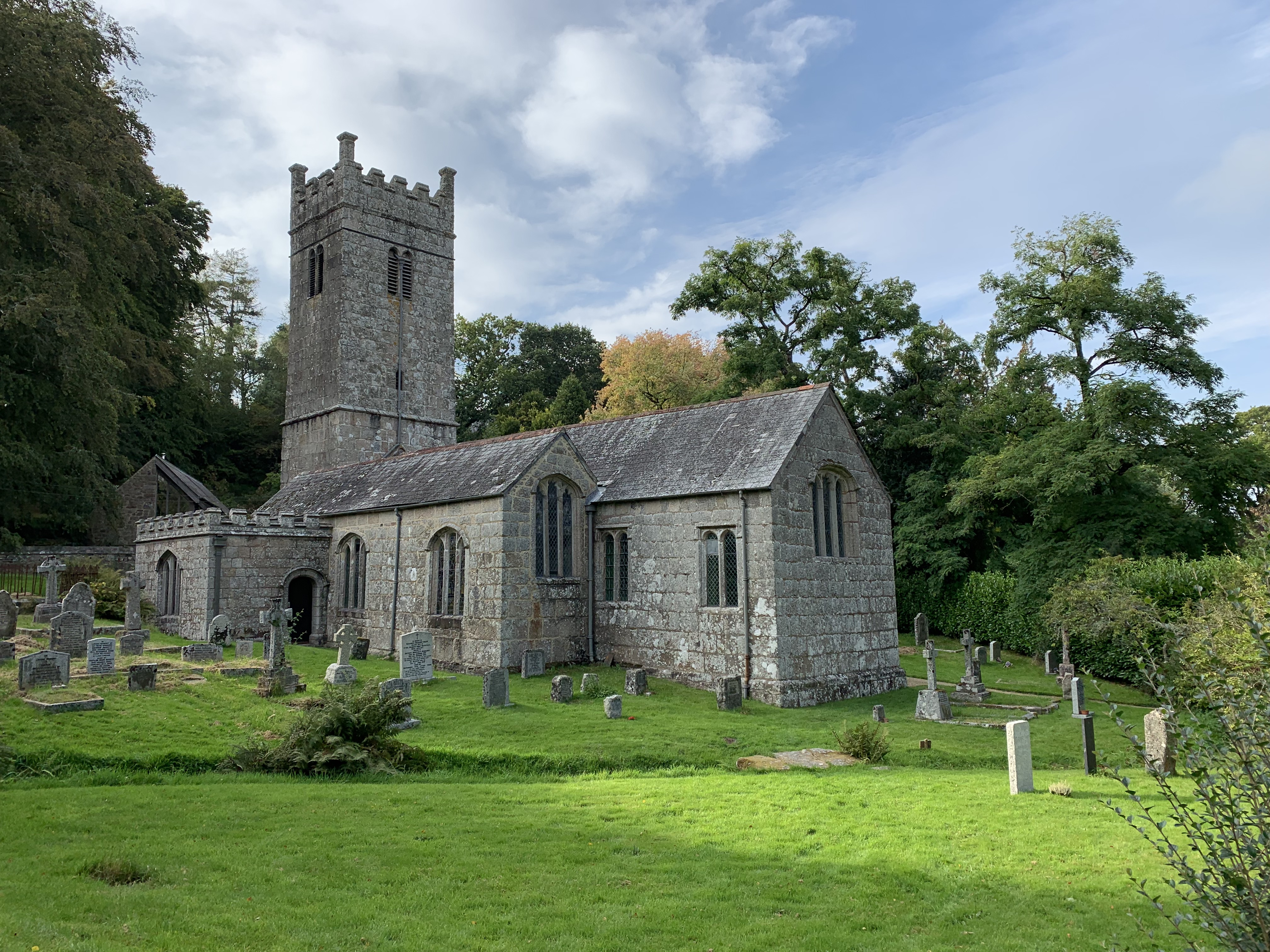
- Holy Trinity Church, Gidleigh

- Location within Devon
- 50°40′46.9″N 3°52′57″W
- OS grid reference: SX 67062 88383
- Location: Gidleigh
- Country: England
- Denomination: Church of England

History
- Dedication: Holy Trinity

Architecture
- Heritage designation: Grade I listed
- Designated: 22 February 1967

Administration
- Province: Canterbury
- Diocese: Exeter
- Archdeaconry: Totnes
- Deanery: Okehampton
- Parish: Gidleigh with Throwleigh

Holy Trinity Church, Gidleigh dates from the late 15th-century, and is a Grade I listed parish church in the Church of England Diocese of Exeter in Gidleigh, Devon.

== History ==
The church has Saxon, or possibly Norman, origins, but was completely rebuilt at the end of the 15th century. It comprises a nave continuous with the chancel which is covered with a waggon shaped roof of Devon oak. The side aisle on the south side is separated from the nave by a three-bay arcade, supported by granite columns. The tower at the west end contains the ring of bells, which are rung from the floor of the church.

The rood screen dates from the 15th century and was decorated in 1853 when the images of saints were added along the lower panels.

The font is 15th century but had a wooden cover made in 1843 by Charles Finch, the parish clerk. In 1853, John Aggett carved the granite pulpit and lectern. He also carved the reredos in 1868 which was originally installed in Chagford church.

In 1863 the rector, Arthur Whipham, submitted a petition for divorce from his wife on the grounds of her alleged adultery with Philip Rowe, a farmer's son from Berrydown farm, Gidleigh. They were caught in bed together at the rectory by P.C. James Bird of the Devon constabulary.

== Organ ==
The pipe organ sits at the back of the south aisle. It was built by Murdoch, Murdoch and Company of London and comprises 5 stops, A specification of the organ can be found in the National Pipe Organ Register.

== Bells ==
The tower contains a peal of 5 bells with the three oldest dating from around 1450.

== Rectory ==
The Old Rectory was built between 1896 and 1897 and occupied by the rectors of Gidleigh until the end of the 20th century. The first occupant was Reverend Burnett who moved in during 1897. It is now in private hands.

== Rectors ==
- ca. 1066 Godwin the Priest
- 1238 Richard, Chaplain
- 1259 Michael de la Leghe
- 1276 Elyas de la Walle
- 1278 Roger de Kymananesdune
- 1284 Walter Pruz
- 1324 Roger Hocke (alias de Madbury)
- 1332 Walter Bot (alias But)
- 1347 Thomas Piper
- 1347-8 Walter de Hertilande
- 1349-50 John de Horewode
- 1368 Richard Chaggeforde
- ???? High Gulbert
- 1391 John Elys
- ???? John Clerk
- 1434 Stephen Wydebrooke
- 1437 Roger Yunge
- 1439 Richard Eggesbury
- 1454 Richard Luky
- 1475 John Payne
- 1475-6 John Denys
- 1516 John Fawell
- 1549 Richard Disturl
- 1580 John Mather
- ???? William Downe
- 1631 Humphry Gaye
- 1683 Edward Seddon
- 1711 Richard Wills
- 1712 William Bedford
- 1726 James Amyatt
- 1735 Christopher Moorhouse
- 1752 John Besley
- 1756 Richard Skinner
- 1791 William Southmead
- 1833 John Atkins
- 1834 John Matthias Hodgson
- 1836 Arthur Whipham
- 1862 Owen Owen
- 1891 William Russell Fox
- 1893 Henry Charles Rickets
- 1896 Montagu Burnett
- 1900 Douglas McLaren
- 1903 Francis Mulock Anderson
- 1905 J.K. de Havilland
- 1909 C.L. Capel-Cure
- 1912 W.R. Mesney (formerly Archdeacon of Sarawak)
- 1914 Joseph Rawson
- 1927 Charles M. Trounsell
- 1954 John Mortimer Scott
- 1968 John O. White
- 1970 Louis M. Coulson
- 1979 William J. Bulley
- 1984 P. Louis Baycock
