= Scorhill =

Stone circle in Devon, England

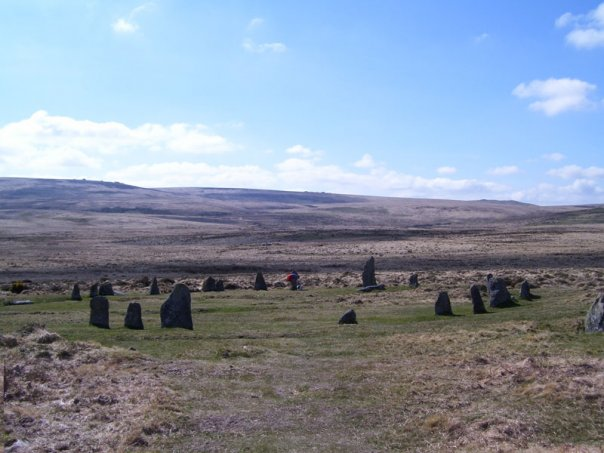
- Scorhill Stone Circle

- Location within Devon
- 50.670583°N 3.905422°W
- Type: Stone circle
- Periods: Bronze Age
- Location: Devon
- OS grid reference: SX65378745

Scorhill (pronounced Scorill) Stone Circle is now the common name for Gidleigh Stone Circle or Steep Hill Stone Circle, one of Devon's biggest and most intact stone circles, situated on Gidleigh Common near the village of Gidleigh in the north east of Dartmoor, in the United Kingdom. It is an English Heritage scheduled monument and has been described as Devon's finest stone circle.

== Description ==
The circle was constructed in the Bronze Age. It is approximately 27 metres (89 feet) in diameter, and the stones vary in height from 0.85 metres (2 feet 9 inches) to an impressive 2.25 metres (7 feet 5 inches) above ground. Gaps between stones vary in width between 0.6 to 0.9 metres (2 ft 0 in to 2 ft 11 in). There are currently 23 standing stones and 11 recumbent. Characteristic of others in the circle, the largest stone has a distinctive jagged point. It has been noted that, when viewed from the centre of the circle, the sun sets over the stone's tip on Midsummer's Eve, indicating some purpose in archaeoastronomy

Several stones show scars and marks of vandalism by stone cutters including rows of holes on many, arranged in lines so the stones could be split with a wedge. Estimates for the original number of stones have varied between 51 and approximately 70, making it among Devon's widest stone circles with the tallest remaining monolith. Although badly damaged, Scorhill has not been subject to any form of restoration, giving it a distinctly ancient atmosphere.

== Archaeology ==
Flint artefacts from around the site on Gidleigh Moor date as far back as 8500 BC, during the Mesolithic period, and are now held at Torquay Museum.

== Folklore ==
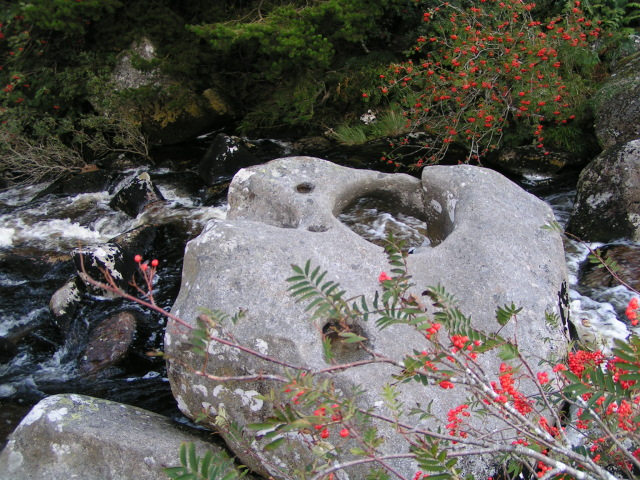
The Tolmen near Scorhill

Scorhill is situated in a landscape of megalithic monuments and features in local stories about horses unwilling to pass through the circle. Some folklore links it to The Tolmen, a stone with a large doughnut-shaped hole in it, overhanging a nearby stream. One story of the "faithless wives and fickle maidens" is of unfaithful women being made to wash themselves in a nearby pool, run around Scorhill three times and then pass through the Tolmen and pray in front of the stones for absolution. Unforgiven women were crushed by a stone, giving the eerie suggestion as to why so many stones have fallen.

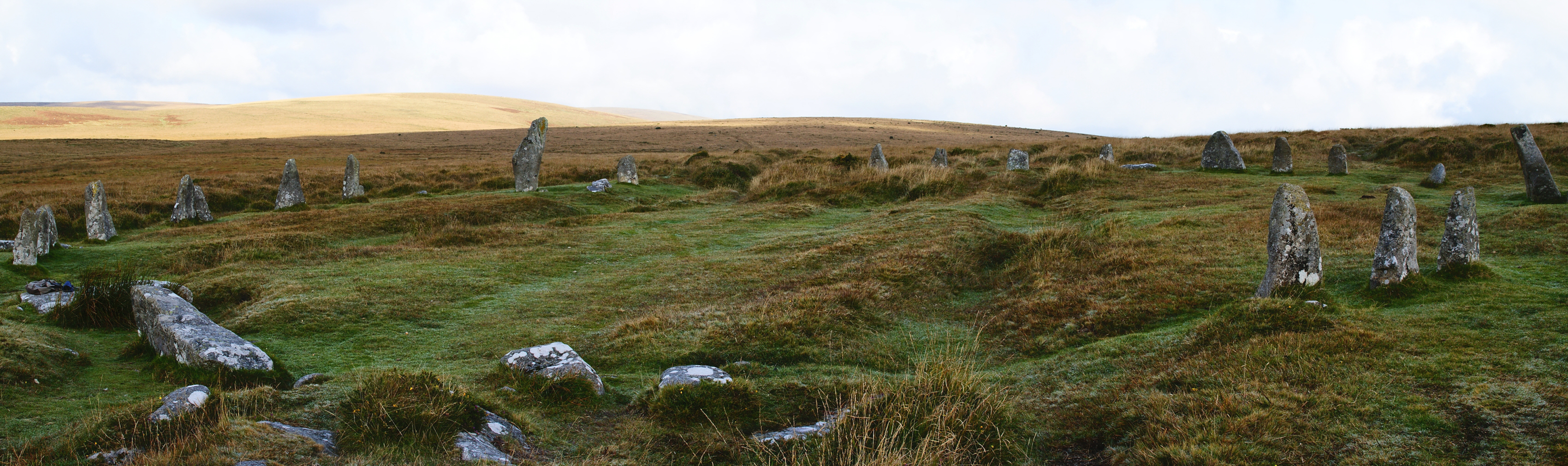
Scorhill Stone Circle

== Literature ==
- Burl, Aubrey, The Stone Circles of Britain, Ireland and Brittany (Yale University Press) 2000.
