= Wortham, Lifton =

Historic manor within the parish of Lifton in Devon, England

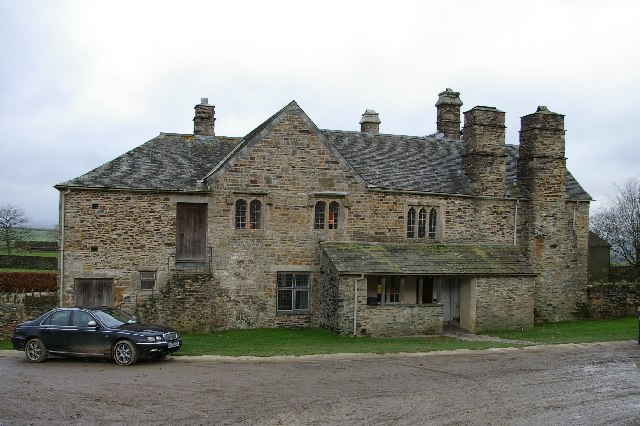
Wortham manor house, viewed in 2006

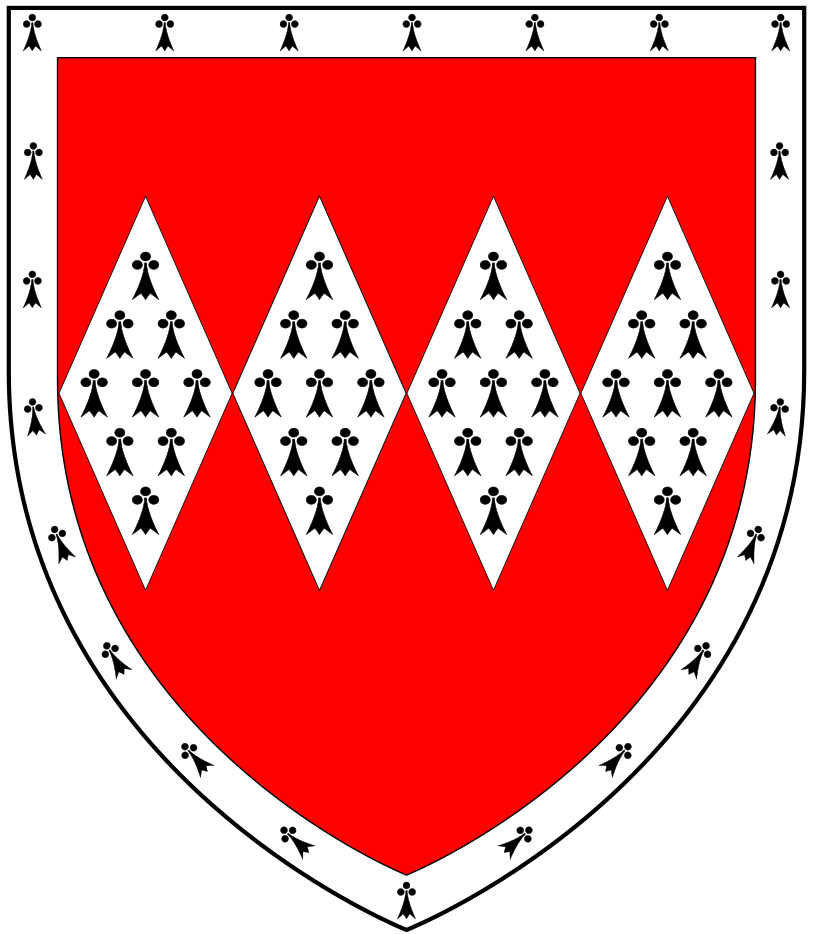
Arms of Dynham of Wortham: Gules, four fusils in fess a bordure ermine. These are the arms of Baron Dynham differenced by a bordure ermine

Wortham is an historic manor within the parish of Lifton in Devon, England. The early sixteenth century manor house survives, today the property of the Landmark Trust. It was long the seat of the Dynham family, a junior branch descended from the Anglo-Norman magnate Baron Dynham. A mural monument survives in Lifton Church to John Dynham (d.1641) of Wortham, consisting of an escutcheon showing the arms of Dynham of Wortham impaling Harris of Hayne (Sable, three crescents argent a bordure of the last) with the crest of Dynham above: An arm couped or hand azure holding a lock of hair sable, with an inscribed tablet beneath. John Dynham (d.1641) was the last in the male line and married Margaret Harris (d.1650), a daughter of Arthur Harris (1561-1628) of Hayne in the parish of Stowford and lord of the manor of Lifton, both in Devon, and of Kenegie in the parish of Gulval in Cornwall, Sheriff of Cornwall in 1603 and Captain of St Michael's Mount, Cornwall. Arthur Harris's grandfather John Harris (d.1551) of Hayne, a Serjeant-at-Law and Recorder of Exeter, had purchased the manor of Lifton from the Nevile family, Earls of Northumberland. John Dynham (d.1641) died without children whereupon his heir (also heir to his younger brother Arthur Dynham) was his niece Mary Hex, a daughter of his sister Margaret Dynham by her husband John Hex of Alternon in Cornwall, who married John Harris of Lifton (a relative of Dynham's wife, Margaret), consequently Wortham passed to the Harris family.

== Sources ==
- Vivian, Lt.Col. J.L., (Ed.) The Visitations of the County of Devon: Comprising the Heralds' Visitations of 1531, 1564 & 1620, Exeter, 1895, p. 316, pedigree of "Dynham of Wortham"
- Pevsner, Nikolaus & Cherry, Bridget, The Buildings of England: Devon, London, 2004, pp. 921–2, "Wortham, Lifton"
