= Ledger line (tombstone) =

Architectural element

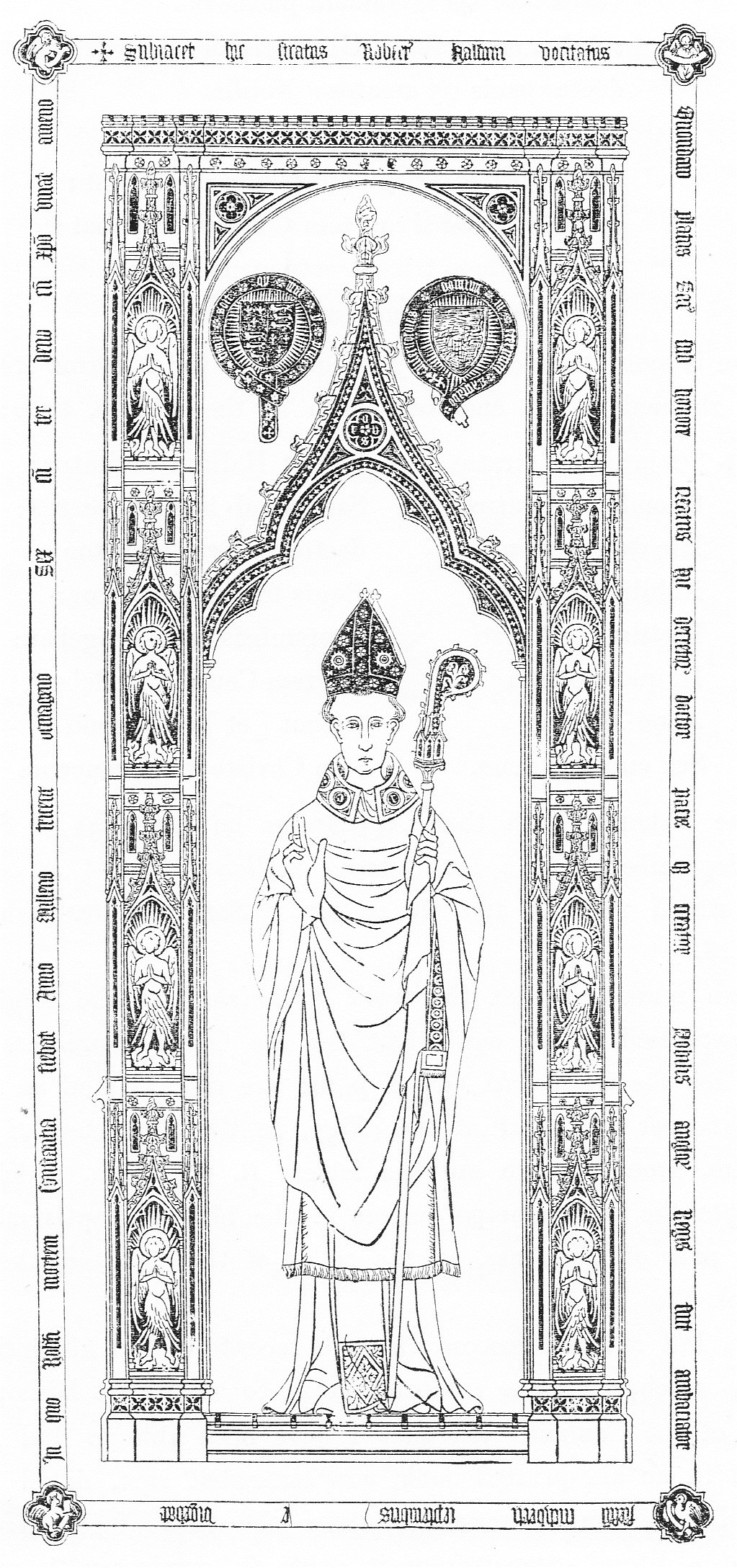
Tombstone of Bishop Hallum (d.1416), Constance Cathedral, showing gothic memorial text on a ledger line

A ledger line refers to the parallel lines incised or sculpted around the edge of the top surface of a mediaeval ledger stone (tombstone), laid flat on the floor of a church or on top of a chest tomb (or "altar-tomb"), within which lines is inscribed an epitaph or simple biographical memorial text, generally in gothic script and in Latin. The phrase "inscribed on a ledger line" is commonly found in the writings of English antiquaries.

Stock phrases or standard elements present in epitaphs within ledger lines on mediaeval church monuments in England include:

- Hic jacet.. (here lies...)
- ... cuius animae propitietur deus amen (generally abbreviated to cuius aie ppitiet ds ame with tildes over the omitted letters) ("whose soul may God look upon with favour Amen")
- Memoriae sacrum ... / MS ("Sacred to the memory (of) ...")
