= Endsleigh Cottage =

Country house in Devon, England

Coordinates: 50.5849°N 4.2742°W

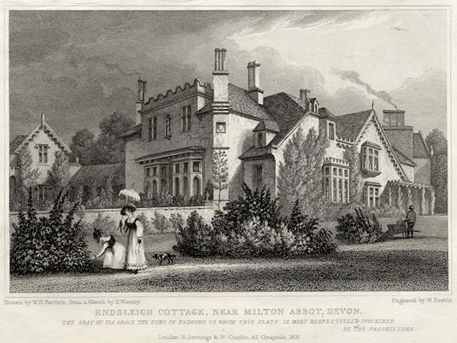
"Endsleigh Cottage near Milton Abbot, Devon, the seat of his grace the Duke of Bedford to whom this plate is most respectfully inscribed by the proprietors, London, w. Jennings & W. Chaplin, 62 Cheapside, 1831". Engraved by W. Dooble

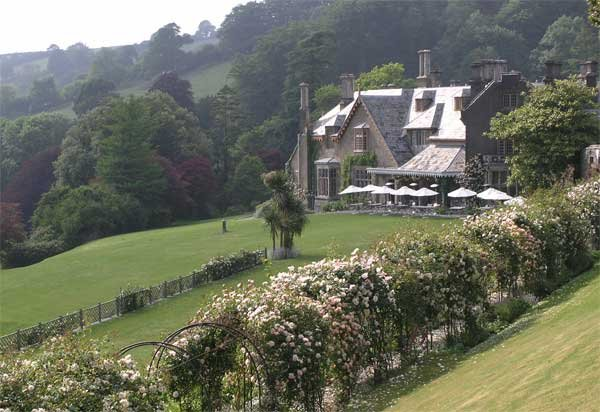
Endsleigh House Hotel today

Endsleigh Cottage (now Endsleigh House) is a country house near Milton Abbot, about 6 miles NW of Tavistock, Devon in England. It is a Grade I listed building. The gardens are Grade I listed in the National Register of Historic Parks and Gardens. The house was built in the early 19th century for the Duke of Bedford. Today, it is a hotel.

== History ==
The house was built between 1810 and 1816 by John Russell, 6th Duke of Bedford, as a private family residence, to the designs of Sir Jeffry Wyatville, in the style of the picturesque movement, and is a grand form of the cottage orné. The house took six years to complete and the final account, dated 1816, of payment to "Sundry Artificers" shows that Wyatville was paid £1,526.4s ll½d out of a total of £4,046.13s 1d. It has been a Grade I Listed Building since 21 March 1967. It was situated within the manor of Milton Abbot, a former manor belonging to Tavistock Abbey, which had been granted with its lands by King Henry VIII to his ancestor John Russell, 1st Baron Russell (created in 1550 1st Earl of Bedford). It is situated on the east bank of the River Tamar, over which it commands superb views to the south and west. Pevsner stated that "the situation of Endsleigh can hardly be matched". It was usefully positioned as a residence whilst the Duke, normally residing at Woburn Abbey in Bedfordshire, was inspecting his extensive Bedford estates in Devon and Cornwall. Before the Civil War, when in Devon the Earl of Bedford resided occasionally at Bedford House in Exeter, built by the family on the site of the Blackfriars Monastery, which had been granted, along with many other lands, to the first Earl of Bedford after the Dissolution of the Monasteries. Endsleigh was also used by the family as a summer holiday home and salmon-fishing lodge. The London streets Endsleigh Street, Endsleigh Gardens and Endsleigh Place, leading off Tavistock Square, all built by a former Duke on the extensive Bedford Estate, are named after the family's Devon property.

== Description ==
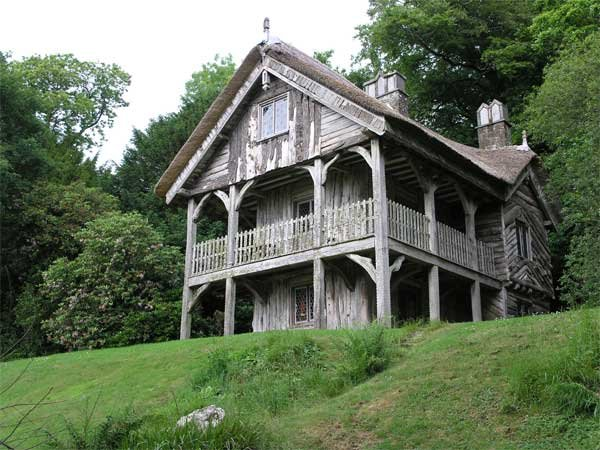
The Swiss Cottage

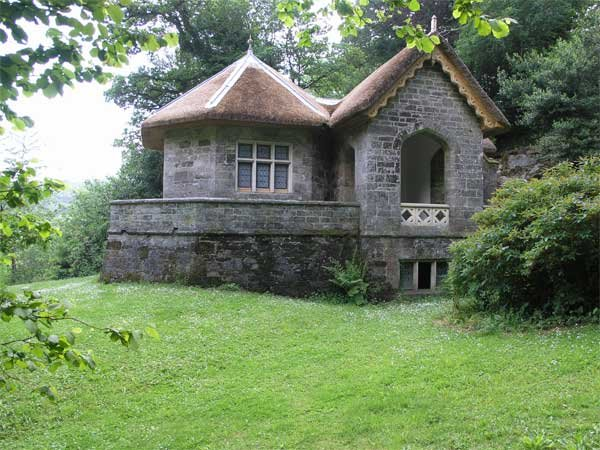
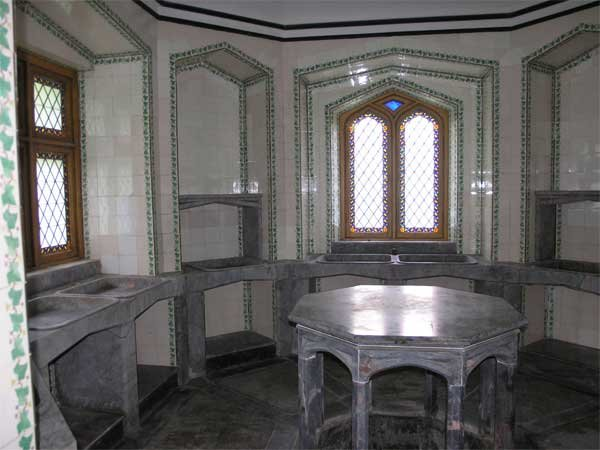
The Dairy

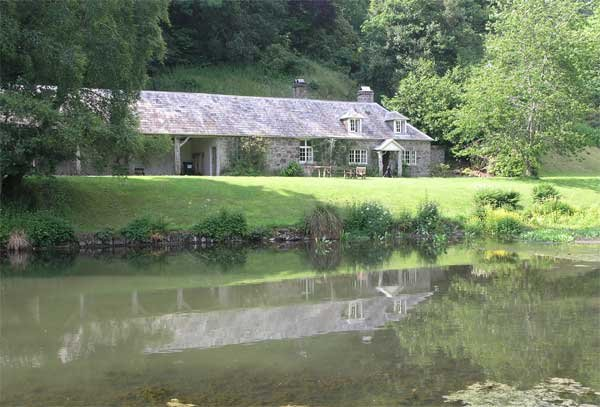
Pond Cottage

Hussey described it as "the outstanding and probably most nearly perfect surviving instance of a romantic cottage orné, devised for an aristocratic owner under the influence of the taste for the picturesque". The site was chosen by the Duchess, as a plaque in the stables records. It consists of a main range with two swept-back wings on either side. The roofline displays several chimney stacks in the Elizabethan style and dormer windows. The east wing was principally a service range, while the west wing is in the form of a pavilion known as the "Children's Cottage" linked by a rustic colonnade to the central block.

== Grounds ==
The landscaping was designed by Humphry Repton and the grounds originally comprised a plantation of 300 acres, including a thickly wooded slope going down to the river, and gardens of 20 acres. The buildings in the grounds include the Shell Grotto, a polygonal summer-house and the Swiss Cottage, restored by the Landmark Trust with a thatched roof. Also, the Dairy Dell, by Repton, Pond Cottages by a pool and the octagonal Dairy surrounded by a loggia, and the Holy Well, part of which is an ancient structure formerly situated at Leigh Barton, and used as the baptismal font of the hunting seat of the Abbots of Tavistock Abbey. The following structures as well as the main house are Grade I listed: Rockery and Grotto, Stables, Salmon Larder and Ice House, Shell House and Grotto.

Hastings Russell, 12th Duke of Bedford died in 1953, aged 64, as a result of a gunshot wound in the grounds of Endsleigh. The coroner recorded his death as accidentally inflicted, but his elder son suggested it may have been deliberately self-inflicted.

== Today ==
In 2004 Endsleigh was owned by a fishing syndicate. Since 2005 it has been a hotel, which retains 108 acres (44 ha) of the grounds. Hotel Endsleigh is owned by Olga Polizzi and has been managed by her daughter, Alex Polizzi, known as the host of Channel 5's The Hotel Inspector since 2008.

== Sources ==
- Pevsner, Nikolaus (1991). Buildings of England: Devon,. pp. 352–355.
- Hussey, Christopher (1961). "Endsleigh Cottage". Country Life. CXXX: 246 & 296.
