= Gidleigh =

Village in Devon, England

Coordinates: 50.6800°N 3.8806°W

- Location within Devon
- Population: 428 (2001 Census)
- OS grid reference: SX671884
  - London: 196 miles (315 km)
- Civil parish: Gidleigh
- District: West Devon
- Shire county: Devon
- Region: South West
- Country: England
- Sovereign state: United Kingdom
- Post town: NEWTON ABBOT
- Postcode district: TQ13
- Dialling code: 01647
- Police: Devon and Cornwall
- Fire: Devon and Somerset
- Ambulance: South Western
- UK Parliament: Torridge and West Devon

Gidleigh is a village and civil parish in the West Devon district of Devon, England. Located within Dartmoor National Park, the parish is surrounded clockwise from the north by the parishes of Throwleigh, Chagford and Dartmoor Forest. In 2001 its population was 116, little changed from 114 in 1901.

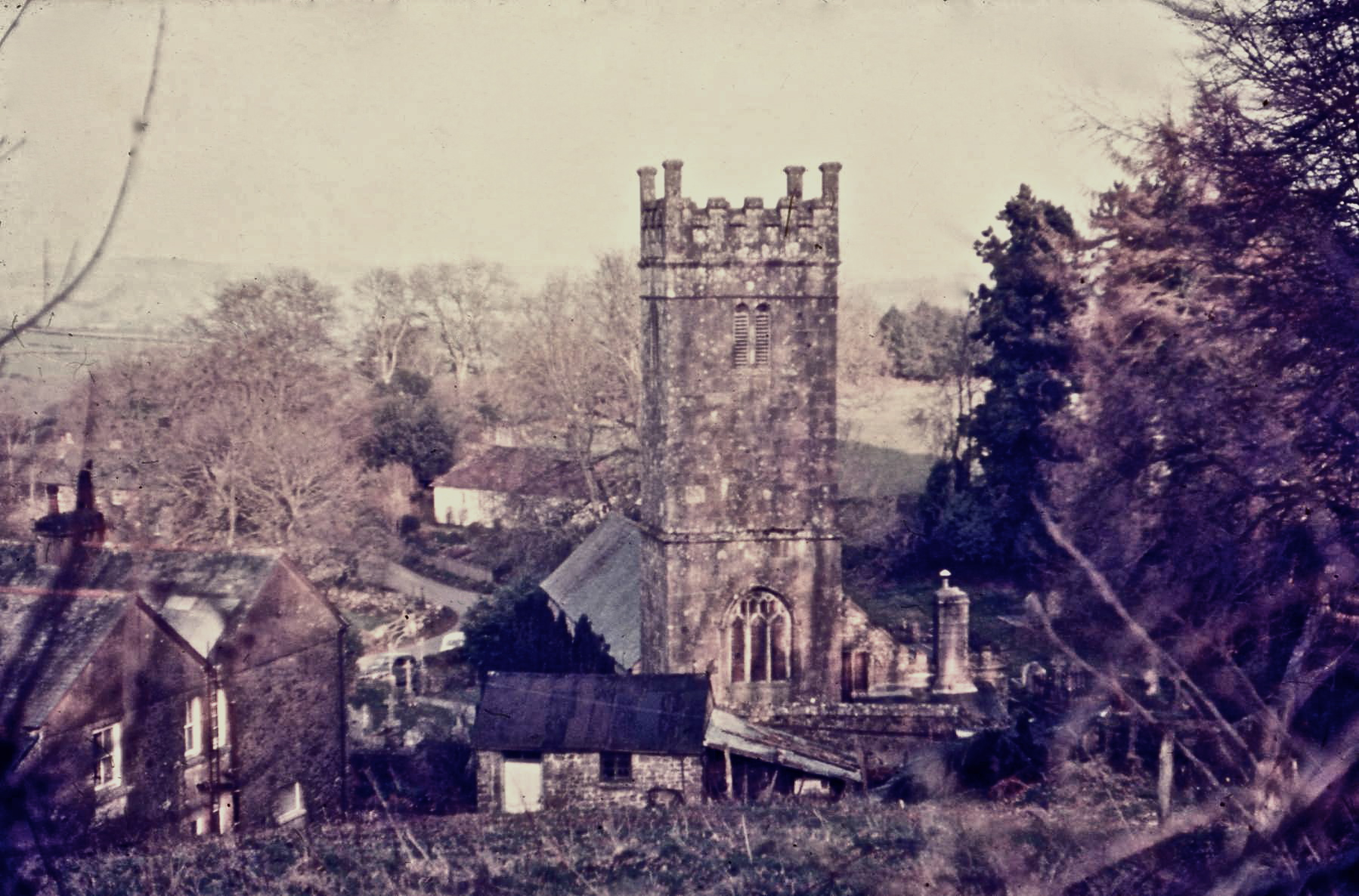
Holy Trinity granite church in 1971

Historically the parish consisted of a number of farmsteads and associated cottages scattered around the focal point of Holy Trinity church (late C15-early C16, with some C17 windows and C19 additions) and the adjacent Gidleigh Castle, which is now in private hands. The population peaked at 180 in the mid 19th century.

The 20th century saw the development of some substantial gentleman's residences - notably Gidleigh Park, which subsequently became a country house hotel - and the building of a village hall. Gidleigh lies on the Mariners' Way and there was a YHA Youth Hostel in the village from 1932 to 1988.

A Methodist elementary school established in 1877 at Providence in Throwleigh parish, little more than a mile from Gidleigh, provided what became the Throwleigh and Gidleigh County Primary School, which closed in 1971 when the pupils were transferred to Chagford.

Gidleigh has a nearby public house in the Northmore Arms, a mile from the village at Wonson in Throwleigh parish, but has no village shop. Residents rely on nearby Chagford for shops and other services.

Scorhill, one of the largest and best preserved stone circles in Devon, is near the village on Gidleigh Common.

In fiction, Gidleigh is the setting for "The Mad Monk of Gidleigh" by Michael Jecks, which is set in 1323.
