= Milton Abbot =

Village in Devon, England

Coordinates: 50.592°N 4.253°W

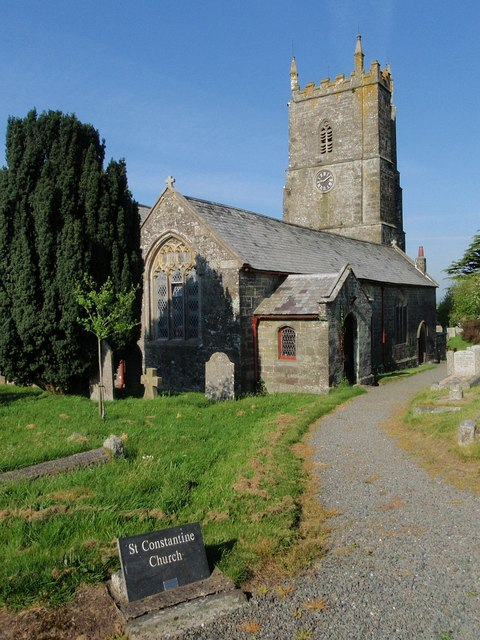
Church of St Constantine and Aegideus, Milton Abbot

Milton Abbot is a village, parish, and former manor in Devon, 6 miles (9.7 km) north-west of Tavistock, Devon, and 6 miles (9.7 km) south-east of Launceston, Cornwall.

== History ==
The manor of Middeltone was donated at some time before the Norman Conquest of 1066 (according to the Devon historian Risdon (d. 1640) by "a knight that dwelt in Daversweek") to Tavistock Abbey, as is recorded in the Domesday Book of 1086, and, together with most of the Abbey's other extensive possessions, was acquired following the Dissolution of the Monasteries by John Russell, 1st Earl of Bedford (c.1485-1554/5), of Chenies in Buckinghamshire and of Bedford House in Exeter, Devon, appointed Lord Lieutenant of Devon by King Henry VIII. In 1810 the manor was owned by his descendant John Russell, 6th Duke of Bedford (1766–1839).

== Historic estates ==
=== Endsleigh ===
In the parish is Endsleigh Cottage, built between 1810 and 1816 by John Russell, 6th Duke of Bedford of Woburn Abbey in Bedfordshire, as a private family residence, to the designs of Sir Jeffry Wyatville, in the style of the picturesque movement, a grand form of the cottage orné, now a hotel.

=== Edgcumbe ===
The estate of Edgcumbe within the parish was the original English seat of the Edgcumbe family (originally de Edgecombe), recorded there in 1292. William Edgcombe (d.1380) married the heiress of Cotehele in the parish of Calstock in Cornwall, to which manor he moved his residence. Sir Richard Edgcumbe (d.1562) built Mount Edgcumbe House in Cornwall and moved there from Cothele. His descendant was Richard Edgcumbe, 1st Baron Edgcumbe (1680–1758), whose second son was George Edgcumbe, 1st Earl of Mount Edgcumbe, 3rd Baron Edgcumbe (1720-1795). The earldom survives today, in a direct male line.
