= Throwleigh =

Village in Devon, England

Coordinates: 50°42′N 3°53′W

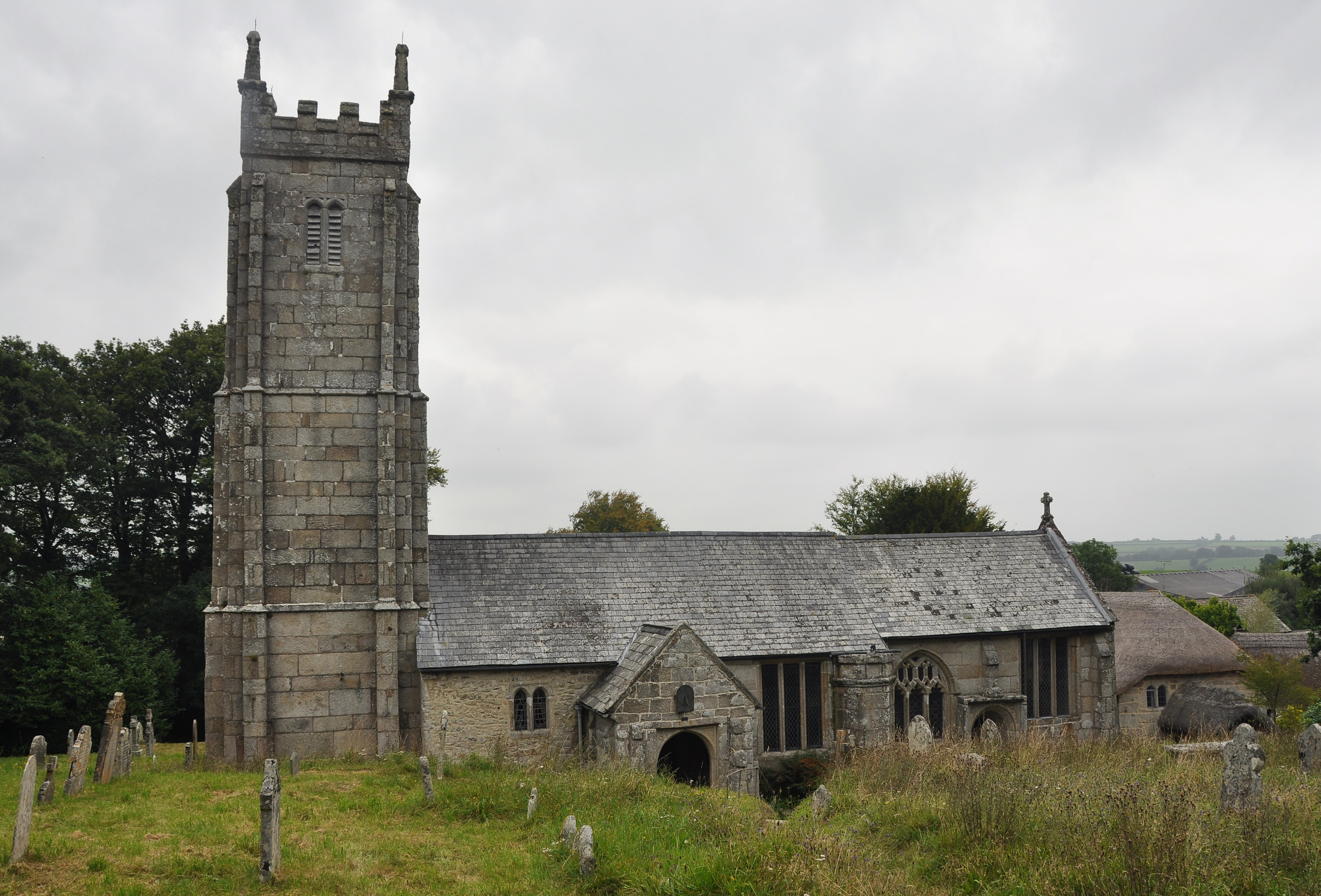
- St Mary the Virgin, Throwleigh

- Location within Devon
- Population: 298 (2001 census)
- Civil parish: Throwleigh
- District: West Devon
- Shire county: Devon
- Region: South West
- Country: England
- Sovereign state: United Kingdom

Throwleigh (/ˈθraʊli/) is a village and civil parish located 3 miles from Chagford and 6 miles from Okehampton, in the West Devon district, in the county of Devon, England. The parish incorporates the village of Throwleigh and the hamlets of Wonson, Providence, and Murchington, whose combined population is approximately 350.

Throwleigh has an Anglican church dedicated to St Mary the Virgin, first recorded in 1268.

At Providence, which lies mid-way between Throwleigh and Gidleigh, a Bible Christian (subsequently Methodist) Chapel ('Providence Chapel') was founded in 1839, and is still operating. In 1877 the Chapel founded an elementary school ('Providence School') which became Throwleigh & Gidleigh County Primary School, closing in 1971 when the pupils were transferred to Chagford.

The hamlet of Wonson, a mile from Throwleigh village, provides the Northmore Arms public house and Throwleigh Village Hall, the latter built in 1949 from a WW2 Nissen hut.

Throwleigh no longer has any shops, and residents look to Chagford or Okehampton for shops and services.
