= Wolff River =

- Etymology: Named after Carl Wolff, a gold prospector.
- Native name: Te Ahi-a-Hikaroroa (Māori)

Location
- Country: New Zealand
- Region: Southland
- District: Southland

Physical characteristics
- Source: Mount Sutherland
  - coordinates: 44°27′54″S 167°54′54″E
- Mouth: Tasman Sea
  - location: Madagascar Beach
  - coordinates: 44°27′4″S 167°51′40″E
  - elevation: Sea level
- Length: 6.3 km (3.9 mi)

Wolff River (Māori: Te Ahi-a-Hikaroroa) is a short river in northern Fiordland, New Zealand. It rises near Mount Sutherland and flows westward to Madagascar Beach, between Martins Bay and Milford Sound / Piopiotahi.

== Naming ==
The river was named in memory of a gold prospector, Carl Wolff. Wolff prospected for gold near the river mouth from 1885 to 1887. He drowned in the wreck of the Try Again at Martins Bay in 1887.

== See also ==
- List of rivers of New Zealand
