= Sydenham Damerel =

Village and civil parish in West Devon, Devon, England

Coordinates: 50.5622°N 4.2478°W

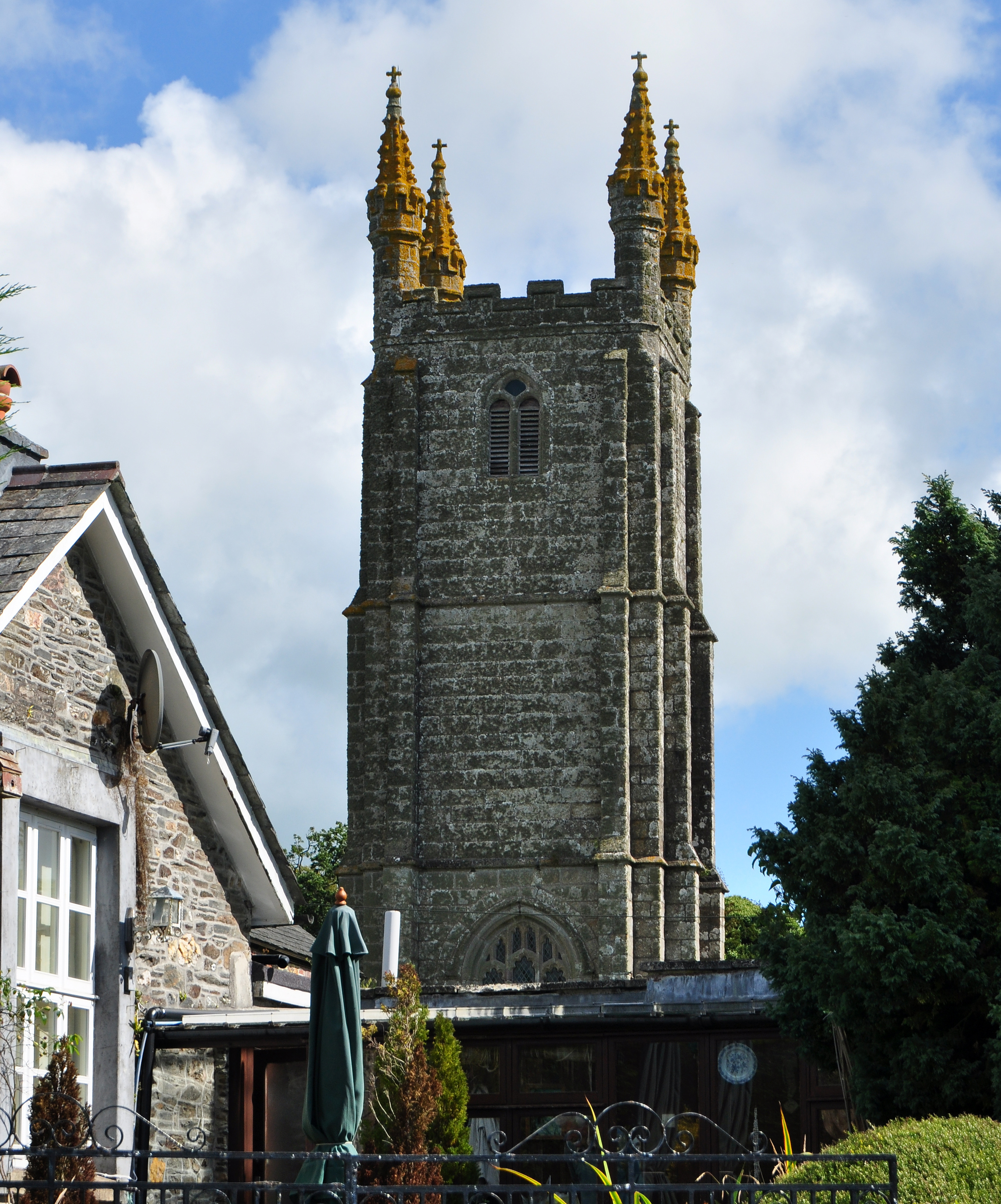
- Tower of St Mary's Church

- Location within Devon
- Population: 244 (2021 census)
- Civil parish: Sydenham Damerel
- District: West Devon
- Shire county: Devon
- Region: South West
- Country: England
- Sovereign state: United Kingdom
- Police: Devon and Cornwall
- Fire: Devon and Somerset
- Ambulance: South Western

Sydenham Damerel, previously South Sydenham, is a village, civil parish and former manor in the West Devon district, in Devon, England, situated 4 miles north-west of Tavistock. In 2021 the parish had a population of 244.

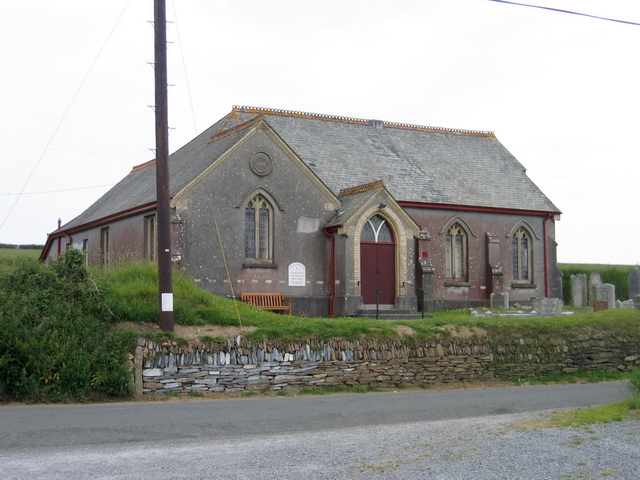
The Methodist chapel

The village lies 1 mile east of the River Tamar which forms the border of Devon with Cornwall, and which also forms the parish boundary. The river is crossed by the listed medieval Horse Bridge, near the hamlet of Horsebridge. The parish church is dedicated to St. Mary.

Sydenham Damerel was in the Lifton hundred. In 1894 Sydenham Damerel became part of Tavistock Rural District. In 1974 Sydenham Damerel became part of West Devon non-metropolitan district in the non-metropolitan county of Devon. On 1 April 2025 the parish council was abolished meaning Sydenham Damerel is now only represented by a parish meeting.
