= Wolf River (apple) =

Apple cultivar

'Wolf River' apple
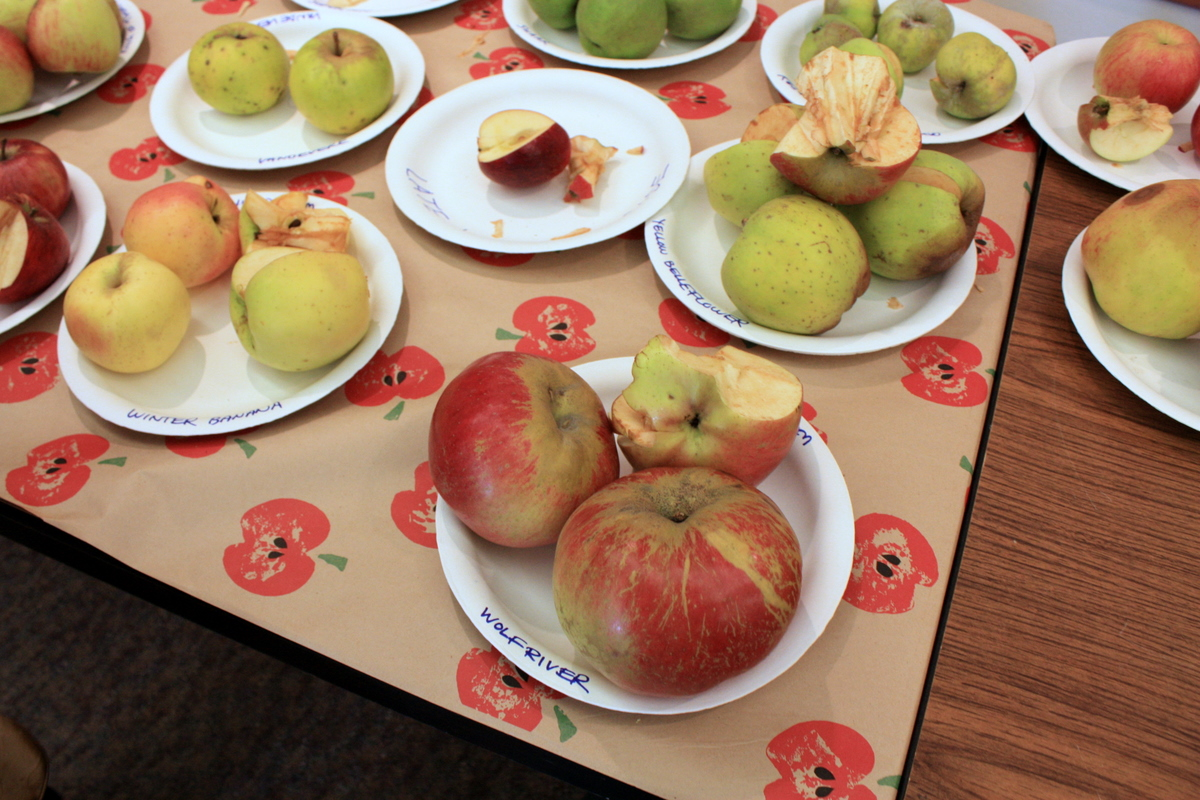
- Genus: Malus
- Species: Malus pumila
- Hybrid parentage: Chance seedling
- Cultivar: 'Wolf River'
- Origin: USA, pre-1875

Wolf River is an American cultivar of domesticated apple, which originates from the shores of the Wolf River of Wisconsin, in the United States of America, known since 1875. The tree is exceptionally frost hardy and generally disease resistant. The fruit usually ripens mid-September to early October. It is large, commonly weighing over a pound, and fairly sweet with a distinctive red and yellow appearance. It has many culinary uses, as it keeps its shape well when cooked.

Wolf River has been described as a world-class apple butter apple, which has long been praised for the rich, fluffy apple butter it provides after hours of slow cooking.
