= St Mary's Church, Throwleigh =

St Mary’s Church, Throwleigh
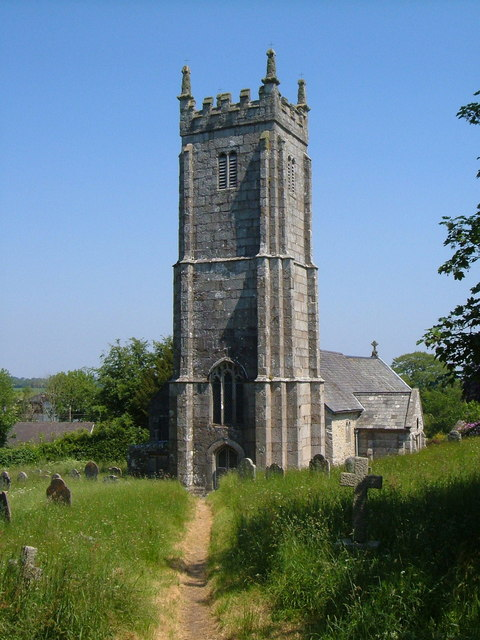
- St Mary’s Church, Throwleigh

- Location within Devon
- 50°42′4.7″N 3°53′17″W
- OS grid reference: SX 66771 90775
- Location: Throwleigh
- Country: England
- Denomination: Church of England

History
- Dedication: St Mary the Virgin

Architecture
- Heritage designation: Grade I listed
- Designated: 22 February 1967

Administration
- Province: Canterbury
- Diocese: Exeter
- Archdeaconry: Totness
- Deanery: Okehampton
- Parish: Gidleigh with Throwleigh

St Mary's Church dates from the late 13th-century, and is a Grade I listed parish church in the Church of England Diocese of Exeter in Throwleigh, Devon.

== History ==
The earliest parts of the church date from the late 13th early 14th century, but it was largely rebuilt in the 15th century. The north aisle was added in the 16th century. The church is noted by Pevsner for the Easter Sepulchre. The pulpit is built of wooden panelling formerly part of the rood screen of 1544.

The church was restored in 1884 and reopened for worship on 6 August 1884. The architect was F. Hunt of Baker Street, London and the work carried out by Aggatt and Underhill of Chagford. New nave seating was provided. The walls were scraped and repointed, and the archway to the tower was opened up.

== Organ ==
The pipe organ sits at the back of the north aisle. It was built by Bevington of London and later extended by Hele and Co of Plymouth. A specification of the organ can be found in the National Pipe Organ Register.

== Bells ==
The tower contains a peal of 6 bells. The three oldest date from 1763 by Pennington and the remaining three of 1935 by Gillett & Johnston.
