= Broadbury Castle =

Archaeological site in England

Coordinates: 50.74200°N 4.15034°W

Broadbury Castle (grid reference SX48379580) is an archaeological earthwork close to Beaworthy in Devon, England.

== Description ==
The site comprises a single bank and ditch which enclose an almost square piece of ground measuring 58 by 68 metres (190 by 223 ft) across. Historic England state that it is the remains of a Roman marching camp, although firm evidence for this is lacking and an alternative interpretation as an Iron Age or Roman-British civilian settlement has also been proposed.

== Recognition ==
The site is legally protected as a scheduled monument, under the Ancient Monuments and Archaeological Areas Act 1979

Broadbury Castle was a familiar place for fox hunting, with Devon newspaper accounts stretching over fifty years.
