= St Michael the Archangel's Church, Chagford =

St Michael the Archangel Church, Chagford
- The Parish Church of Saint Michael the Archangel Chagford
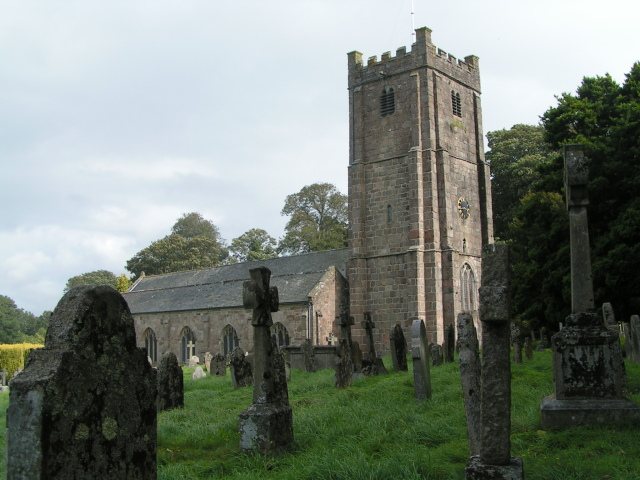
- St Michael the Archangel's Church, Chagford

- Location within Devon
- 50°40′22″N 3°50′20″W
- OS grid reference: SX 70146 87508
- Location: Chagford
- Country: England
- Denomination: Church of England
- Previous denomination: Roman Catholic
- Churchmanship: Broad/high Church

History
- Dedication: Saint Michael the Archangel

Architecture
- Heritage designation: Grade I listed
- Designated: 22 February 1967

Administration
- Province: Canterbury
- Diocese: Exeter
- Archdeaconry: Totnes
- Deanery: Okehampton
- Parish: Chagford

Clergy
- Rector: Reverend P. Seaton-Burn

St Michael the Archangel's Church, Chagford is a Grade I listed parish church in the Church of England Diocese of Exeter in Chagford, Devon.

== History ==
The church is medieval but appears to have been completely rebuilt in the 15th century. In 1870 the galleries were removed and the north aisle lengthened to compensate for the loss of accommodation. The organ was re-erected at the east end of the north aisle and was enlarged with several additions. A stained glass window by Ballantine of Edinburgh was erected in the tower in memory of Mrs John Northmore, the rector's sister. Gas lighting was introduced into the church, designed by Mr. Rouell of Newton Abbot, and executed by Mr. Willey of Exeter.

The tower was restored by Messrs Dart and Francis of Crediton under the supervision of the architect W. D. Caröe between 1914 and 1915 at a cost of £800 when the bells were all recast.

== Organ ==
The earliest reference to an organ is 1527 when the Vicar purchased the organ from the Lady Chapel of Exeter Cathedral for £5. 6s. 3d. (equivalent to £4,500 in 2025). In 1594 it was reported that the organ contained 82 pipes.

In 1854 an organ was installed by H.P. Dicker of Plymouth. This was enlarged in 1870 by the same builder when it was moved to the end of the north aisle.

In 1891 Hele and Company of Plymouth installed a new organ and it was used for the first time on Sunday 7 June 1891.

This has been restored by the same company in 1901 and 1956. The organ now comprises 3 manuals and 23 speaking stops. A specification of the organ can be found in the National Pipe Organ Register.

=== Organists ===
- Thomas Leaman 1857 - 1865 (afterwards organist of St Mary's Church, Ilminster)
- Theodore Köberlein 1865 - 1866
- Edward Moxhay Vinnicombe 1867 - 1869 (afterwards organist of Upton Church, Torquay)
- George Hurrell ca. 1874 - 1893 (blind)
- Edward Ellis Vinnicombe 1893 - 1901 (afterwards organist of St Peter's Church, Sudbury)
- E.A. Russell ca. 1902
- Percy Collings 1906 - 1923
- H.A. Whitfield 1923 - 1929 (afterwards organist at Eltham)
- S.C. Williams 1930 - ca. 1950s

== Bells ==
An inventory of church goods in 1553 records five bells in the church and one bell in the chapel of Southteyn. On 12 August 1765, a license was granted by the Bishop of Exeter to cast the five bells into six. This was done in 1766 by Thomas Bilbie of Cullompton. In 1877, a treble and second were added to make a peal of eight.

The tower contains a peal of 8 bells cast by John Taylor & Company of Loughborough in 1914 when the tower was restored. They were installed in the tower and dedicated on 3 February 1915.
