= Church of St Nonna, Bradstone =

Church in Devon, England

Church of St Nonna
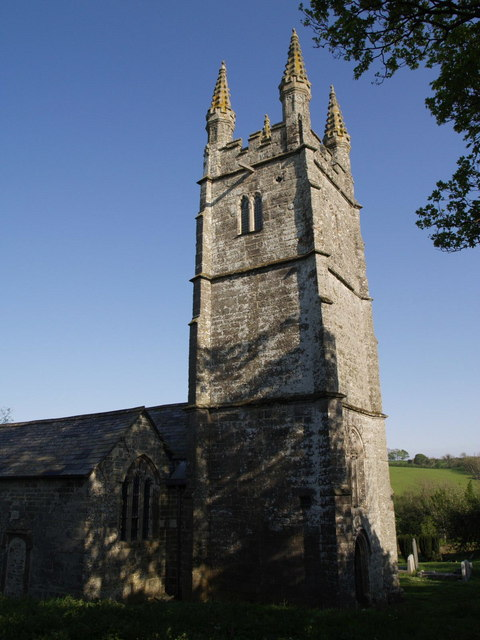

- Location within Devon
- 50°36′20″N 4°17′22″W
- Location: Bradstone, Devon, England

History
- Built: 12th century

Listed Building – Grade I
- Official name: Church of St Nonna
- Designated: 21 March 1967
- Reference no.: 1326684

The Church of St Nonna is a redundant church in Bradstone, Devon, England that was built in the 12th century. It is recorded in the National Heritage List for England as a designated Grade I listed building, and is in the care of the Churches Conservation Trust. It was vested in the Trust on 12 November 1996. The church is named after Saint Nonna.

The church has an arcaded north aisle. The west tower was added in the 15th century. The tracery in the south wall of the chancel is believed to date from 1261 when the church was dedicated by Bishop Walter Branscombe.

Outside the tower is a stone dedicated to John Coumbe, said to have lived from 1484 to 1604 - outliving the entire Tudor dynasty.

== See also ==
- List of churches preserved by the Churches Conservation Trust in South West England
