= Bratton Clovelly =

Village in Devon, England

Coordinates: 50.69°N 04.18°W

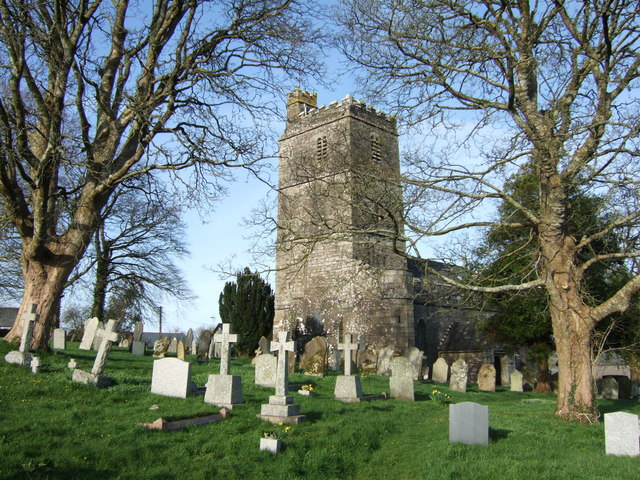
- St Mary's church

- Location within Devon
- Population: 399
- OS grid reference: SX464918
- District: West Devon
- Shire county: Devon
- Region: South West
- Country: England
- Sovereign state: United Kingdom
- Police: Devon and Cornwall
- Fire: Devon and Somerset
- Ambulance: South Western

Bratton Clovelly is a village, parish and former manor in the west part of Devon, England. It is situated about 8 miles (13 km) south-west of Okehampton immediately north of the A30 road. The manor of Bratton Clovelly was listed in the Domesday Book of 1086. The parish church dedicated to St Mary is 15th century, with many Norman features. The former village stocks are kept in the belfry. The parish is thought to have been the birthplace of influential 13th-century jurist Henry de Bracton; however, this claim is also made for at least two other places.

== Pack Horse Trail ==
The village lies on one of the oldest Pack Horse Trails between Devon and Cornwall. The trail followed a ridge linking Okehampton (Devon) to Launceston (Cornwall), both having fortifications in the form of Norman Castles. Bratton Clovelly lies midway between these centres hence affording a high ground resting point for travellers and traders.

== Historic estates ==
=== Burnby ===
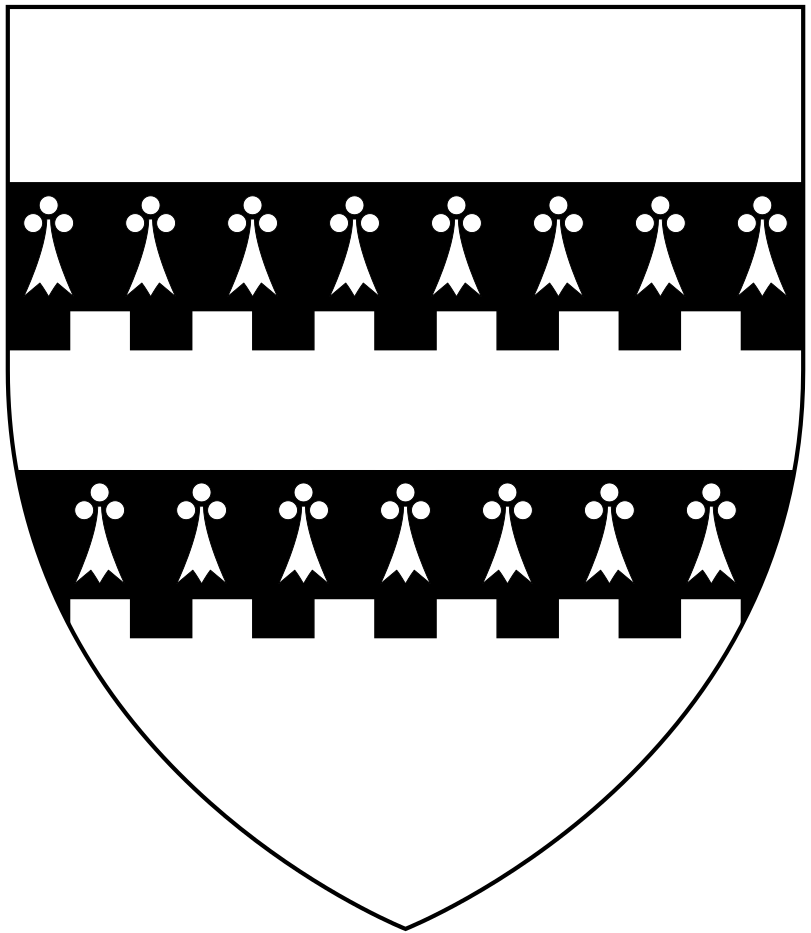
Arms of Burnby: Argent, two bars counter-embattled ermines

The estate of Burnby (alias Burneby, Burnaby, Bunbury, etc.) is not listed in the Domesday Book of 1086 but in 1810 "Bunbury" was described as "the principal estate in the parish", and was then the property of John Hawkes of Okehampton. It had long been the seat of the Burnby family, as stated by Risdon (d.1640):

Burnby hath been the dwelling of the Burnbeys many generations, a name extracted even from the line of the English-Saxon nation and continueth the inheritance of that name to this day, who are allied to worshipful families.

Vestiges of the Burnby family survive in St Mary's Church, in the form of fragments of 15th-century heraldic glass now in the vestry but originally in the window of a former chapel at the east end of the south aisle, of which chapel the piscina survives. The glass was removed from the south-east window by Rector Birdwood (in office 1816-46) and replaced in the east window and was moved again in 1886 to the vestry. Beneath the choir stalls is the ledger stone of Thomas Burneby and under the lectern is the ledger stone of Richard Burnby 1603. Kelly's Directory of 1893 states a descendant of this family to have been the swashbuckling "Col. Fred Burnaby, RHG, killed in the Sudan", at the Battle of Abu Klea. The pedigree of "Burnby of Burnby" is included in the Heraldic Visitations of Devon.
