= Germansweek =

Village in Devon, England

Coordinates: 50.7264°N 4.2135°W

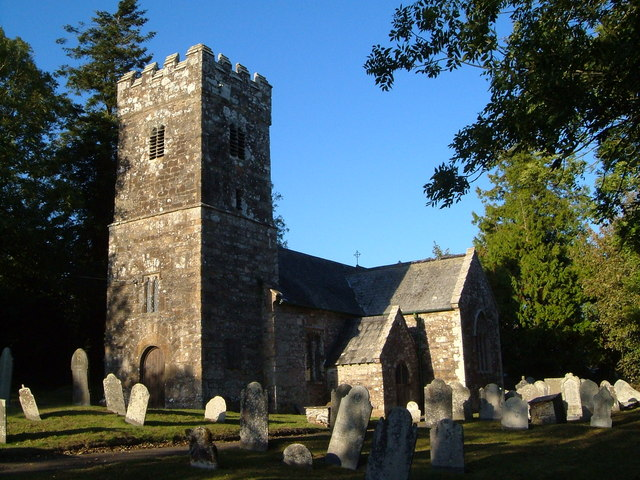
St German's Church

Germansweek is a village and civil parish in the West Devon district, to the west of Okehampton in the county of Devon, England.

The place-name Germansweek is first attested in the Domesday Book of 1086, where it appears as Wica. It appears as Wyk in 1242 in the Book of Fees, and as Wyke in 1270 and Wyke Germyn in 1458 in the Feet of Fines. The 'week' element is the Old English 'wic', from the Latin 'vicus', meaning a farm or village. The 'Germans' element comes from the dedication of the church to St Germanus of Auxerre.
