= Bradstone =

Village in Devon, England

Coordinates: 50.6056°N 4.2895°W

- Location within Devon
- Population: 63
- OS grid reference: SX3880
- District: West Devon
- Shire county: Devon
- Region: South West
- Country: England
- Sovereign state: United Kingdom
- Police: Devon and Cornwall
- Fire: Devon and Somerset
- Ambulance: South Western

Bradstone is a village in Devon, England, on the River Tamar. It has a small church and a Tudor hall (now a farm) with an attractive gatehouse.

Bradstone Manor Farm is a Grade II listed manor house with a Grade I listed 16th century gatehouse.

The Church of St Nonna was built in the 12th century. It has been designated as a Grade I listed building and is now in the care of the Churches Conservation Trust. The church has an arcaded north aisle. The west tower was added in the 15th century. The tracery in the south wall of the chancel is believed to date from 1261 when the church was dedicated by Bishop Walter Branscombe. Outside the tower is a stone dedicated to John Coumbe, said to have lived from 1484 to 1604 — outliving the entire Tudor dynasty.

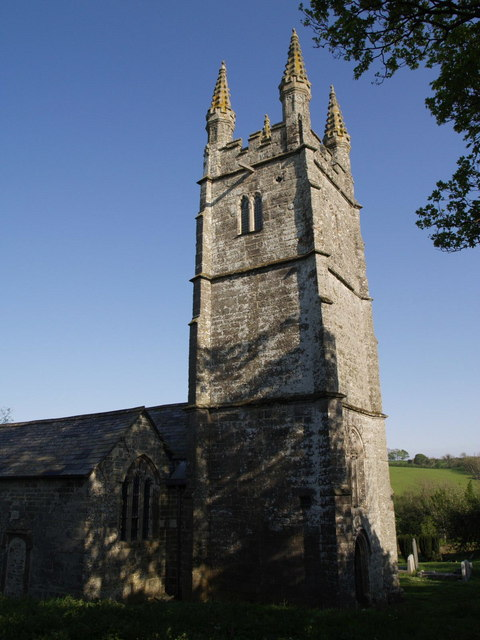
St Nonna's church, Bradstone

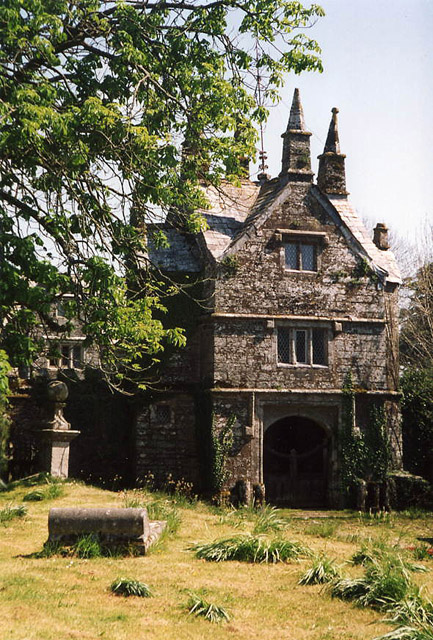
Bradstone: gatehouse

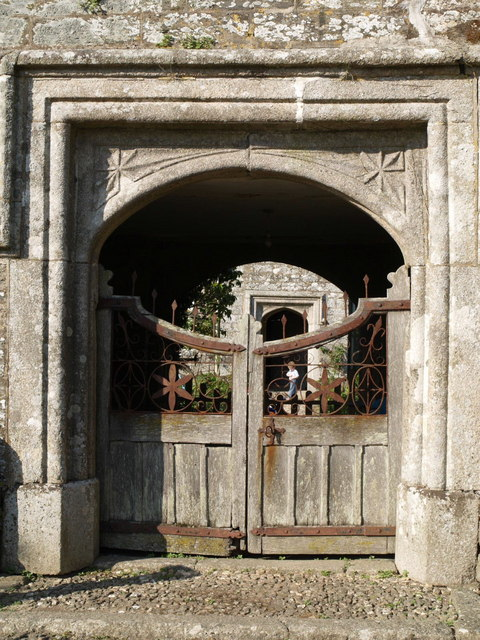
Through the gatehouse
