= Broadwoodwidger =

Village in Devon, England

Coordinates: 50°41′N 4°15′W

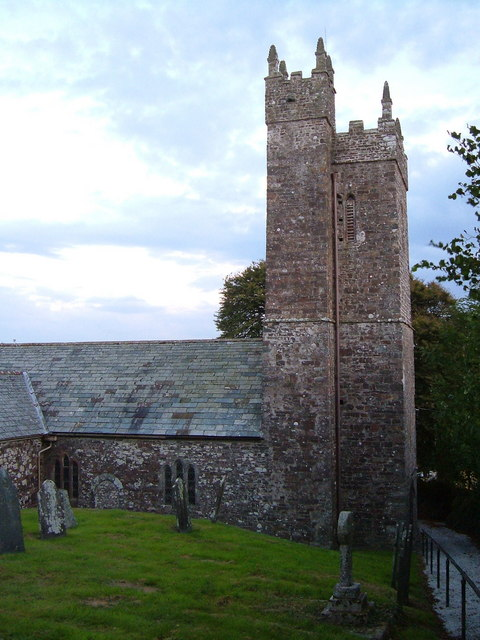
St Nicholas' Church, Broadwoodwidger

Broadwoodwidger is a village and civil parish in the Torridge district of Devon, England. According to the 2001 census it had a population of 548. The village is just to the north of the A30 road, and is about eight miles east of Launceston in Cornwall, and 13 miles west of Okehampton. Roadford Reservoir, which is also called Roadford Lake, is to the north-east of the village, and the River Wolf passes at the bottom of the hillside on which the village stands.

Broadwoodwidger has a church on top of the hill, with views to Brentor and surrounding countryside. There is a village green, phone box, bus shelter and post box. The parish had a small primary school three miles north of the village at Ivyhouse Cross, but it has now been closed down.

The church is 15th century, with some 13th-century features such as the tower and chancel. There is also a Norman font, and benches with carvings of curious animals. Broadwoodwidger was from 1876 to 1922 in the Diocese of Truro but was then returned to the Diocese of Exeter. Bishop John Grandisson appropriated the church to Frithelstock Priory in 1333. From 1273 the advowson and manor had been held by the Widger family; they were acquired by the priory by the generosity of the Stapeldons. Bishop Fox augmented the vicarage in 1479.

The name derives from broad wood of the Wyger family and is first documented as Brod(e)wode Wyger in 1306. The manor here passed from the Vypund family to the Wygers before 1273. It was earlier known simply as Broad wood, for example it appears as Bradewode in the Domesday Book of 1086.

== See also ==
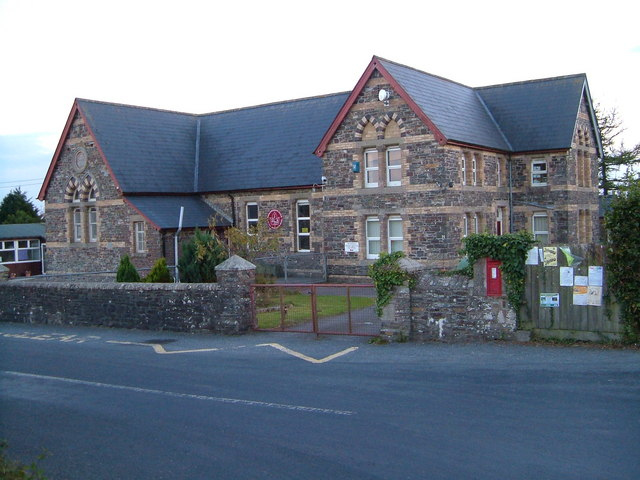
The primary school

- Broadwoodwidger Rural District
