= Lifton, Devon =

Village in Devon, England

Coordinates: 50.6431°N 4.2821°W

Lifton
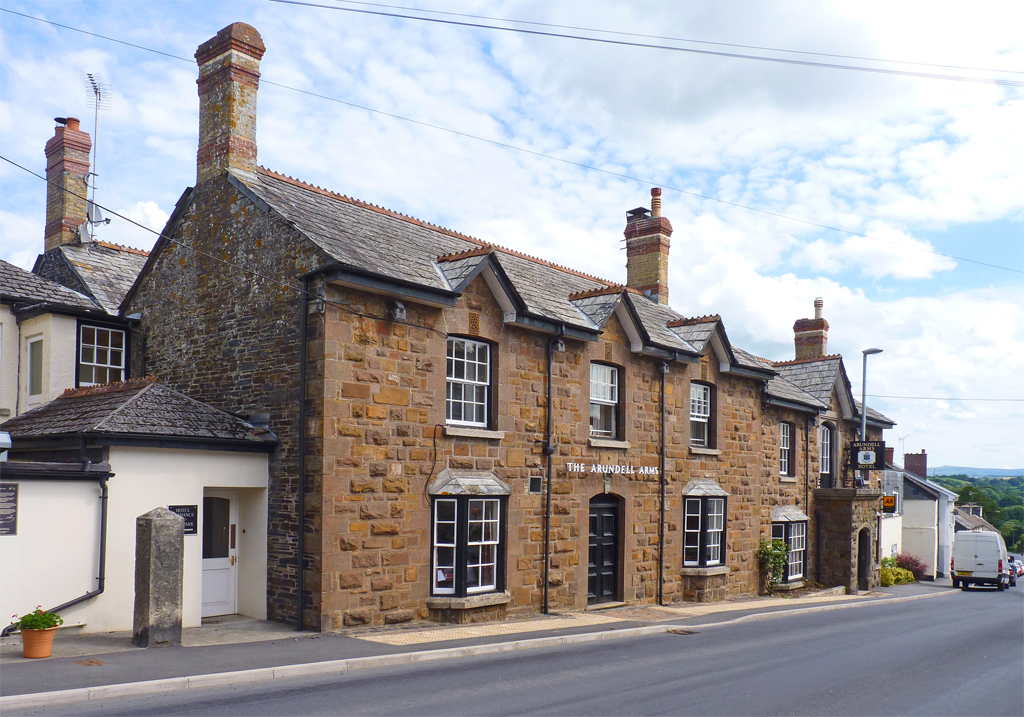
- Arundell Arms, Lifton

- Location within Devon
- Population: 1,180
- OS grid reference: SX386851
- District: West Devon
- Shire county: Devon
- Region: South West
- Country: England
- Sovereign state: United Kingdom
- Post town: LIFTON
- Postcode district: PL16
- Dialling code: 01566
- Police: Devon and Cornwall
- Fire: Devon and Somerset
- Ambulance: South Western
- UK Parliament: Torridge and West Devon

Lifton is a village and civil parish in Devon, South West England near the confluence of the rivers Wolf and Lyd, 1¼ miles south of the A30 trunk road and very near the border between Devon and Cornwall. The village is part of the electoral ward of Thrushel. The population of the surrounding Thrushel ward (which includes the much smaller village of Thrushelton to the east of Lifton) at the 2011 census was 1680.

== History ==
The village was one of the first in the west of Devon to be founded by the Saxons, and was of strategic importance because of its location on a major route close to the border with Cornwall. It was first recorded as Liwtune in the will of King Alfred in the late 9th century when it was left to his youngest son Æthelweard (c.880-922).

At a meeting of the Witan in Lifton on 12 November 931 King Æthelstan granted land to his thegn Wulfgar, and the charter was witnessed by King Hywel Dda of Deheubarth and King Idwal Foel of Gwynedd.

Lifton became the centre of an administrative hundred, and was a royal manor, passing into private hands when sold by Queen Elizabeth I to local landowner William Harris of Hayne in the parish of Stowford, Devon, in the late 16th century. Since they had moved here from Kenegie in Cornwall their armorial bearings include a motto in Cornish, which is "Car Dew tres pub tra" ("Love God above everything"). A former inn at Portgate, the Harris Arms, named after the family, is now a private residence

There has been a church in Lifton since Norman times, although little of the existing St Mary's Church is earlier than the 15th century. In 1755 the manor was inherited by the Arundell family. The Arundell Arms is a hotel, formerly a coaching inn known as the "White Horse", which is known today for fishing.

Agriculture and mining have supported the economy in the past. The dairy company, Ambrosia, has been based here since 1917. Started as a milk factory using supplies from dairy farms in the area, it produced dried milk during the Second World War. The site has been enlarged considerably and the firm is now an important local employer.

Lifton railway station on the South Devon and Tavistock Railway opened on 1 June 1865. The main building was on the platform used by trains towards Plymouth but there was a loop and second platform to allow trains to pass. There was a level crossing at the west end of the station.

The goods yard was on the same side as the buildings but a private siding was opened in 1894 to serve a corn mill, and a factory was opened in the goods yard in 1917 that handled milk, and later made "Ambrosia" rice pudding. Passenger trains and public goods traffic ceased on 31 December 1962 but the line to Lydford was retained to carry the trains from the milk factory but this closed on 28 February 1966.

The village was bypassed by the A30 in 1993, and today, unusually for such a small place, Lifton is a post town and has several youth football teams. It also has the 1st Lifton Sea Scouts.

== Historic estates ==
=== Lifton Park ===
A country house called Lifton Park was built by William Arundel in 1805 and was the centre of the Lifton estate. Frederick Stockdale said of the house "very delightfully situated and commands an interesting prospect of the town of Launceston with its ancient castle, indeed no expense seems to have been spared to render the surrounding plantations containing about 8,000 acres."

During the Second World War, a boys' preparatory school called Moffatt's was evacuated to the house from Hertfordshire (actor Dudley Sutton was one of the pupils), and shortly after the war the house was severely damaged by fire. The west wing has since been restored, but most of the former house still stands in ruins. Part of the park is an arboretum. The two entrances to the park still have lodges dating from the Victorian era.

=== Wortham ===
The manor of Wortham, in the parish of Lifton, was long a seat of the Dynham family, a junior branch descended from the Anglo-Norman magnate Baron Dynham. The early 16th century manor house survives, today the property of the Landmark Trust.

=== Gatherleigh ===
Gatherleigh in the parish of Lifton was the seat of the Hunkin family, of whom prominent members were Joseph Hunkin (1610-1661) Governor of Scilly between 1651 and 1660; Joseph Hunkin (1887-1950), born in Truro, Cornwall, the 8th Bishop of Truro from 1935 to 1950. His monument in Truro Cathedral displays the arms of Hunkin of Gatherleigh, namely: Argent, a mascle sable over all a fess of the last.
