= Stowford =

Village in Devon, England

Coordinates: 50.6606°N 4.2198°W

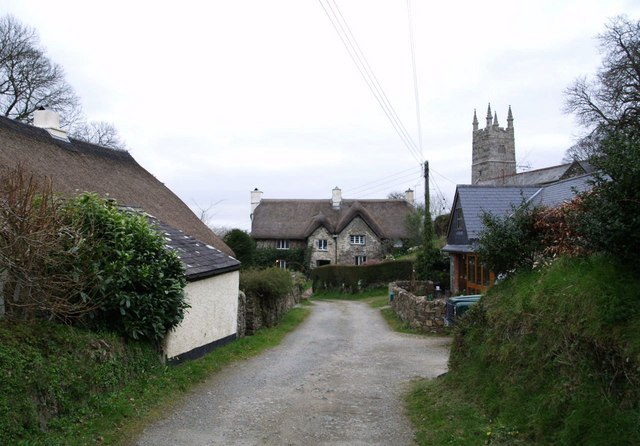
- Stowford

- Location within Devon
- Population: 303
- OS grid reference: SX432869
- Civil parish: Stowford
- Shire county: Devon
- Region: South West
- Country: England
- Sovereign state: United Kingdom
- Police: Devon and Cornwall
- Fire: Devon and Somerset
- Ambulance: South Western
- UK Parliament: Torridge and West Devon

Stowford is a village and civil parish in the district of West Devon in the English county of Devon. It is situated to the west of Dartmoor. Stowford is about 1 mile west of the village of Lewdown and about 11 miles south-west of Okehampton in Devon and 7 miles east of Launceston in Cornwall. The parish is very rural, and includes the hamlet of Sprytown.

The parish church is dedicated to St John the Baptist and is around 14th-15th century in date. The church was restored and the north aisle rebuilt by Sir Gilbert Scott in 1874.

An ancient stone stands at the entrance to the churchyard. It stands 170 cm out of the ground, and contains an inscription dated to the 8th-11th century. The inscription reads "GUNGLEI" or "GUG.LES" and is thought to be a personal name.

The Harris Baronetcy, of Stowford, near Launceston, in the County of Devon, was created in the Baronetage of England on 1 December 1673 for Arthur Harris, Member of Parliament for Okehampton between 1671 and 1681. The Harris residence was at Hayne House in the parish of Stowford. The title became extinct on his death in 1686.
