= Forest of Dartmoor =

Ancient royal forest in Devon, England

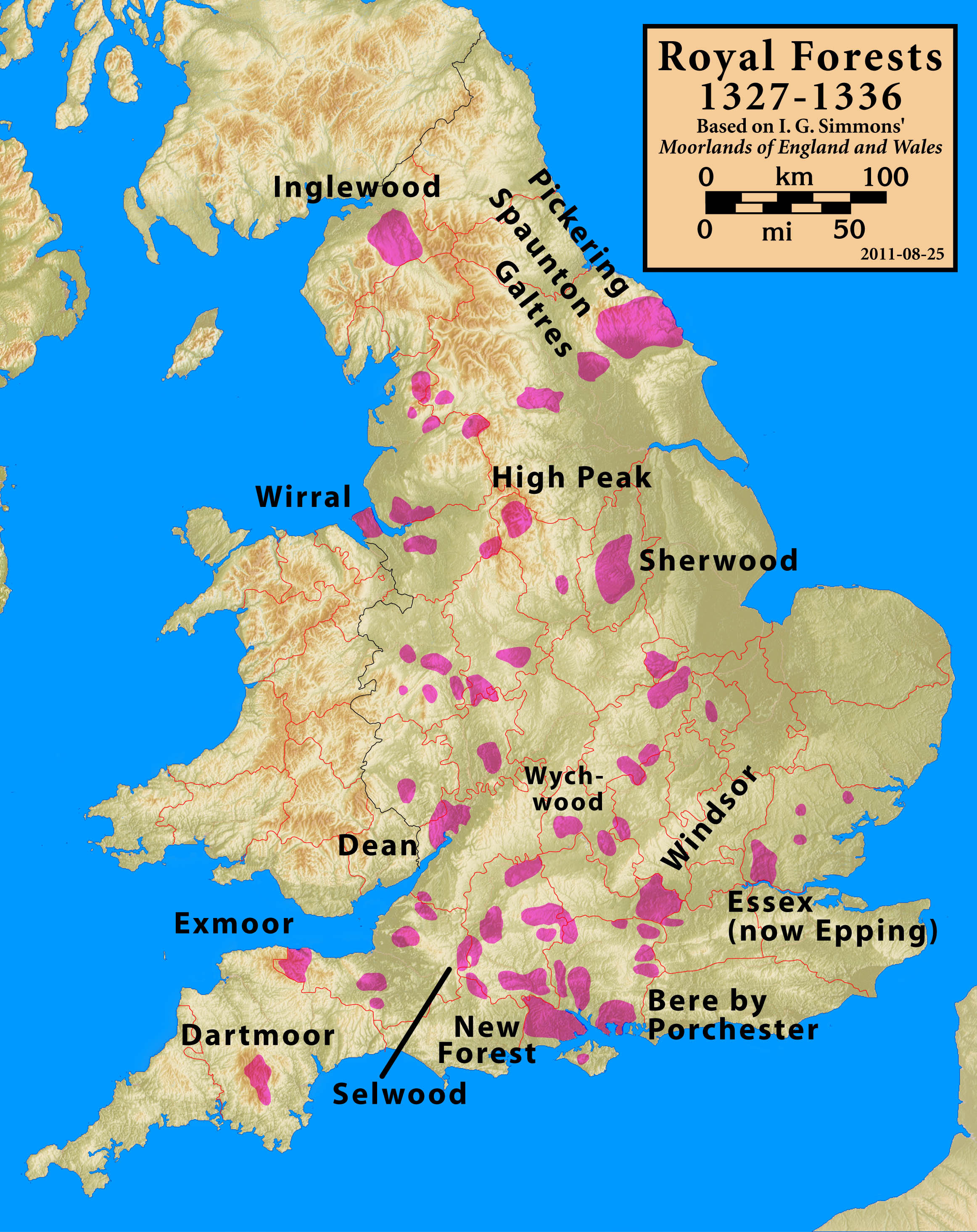

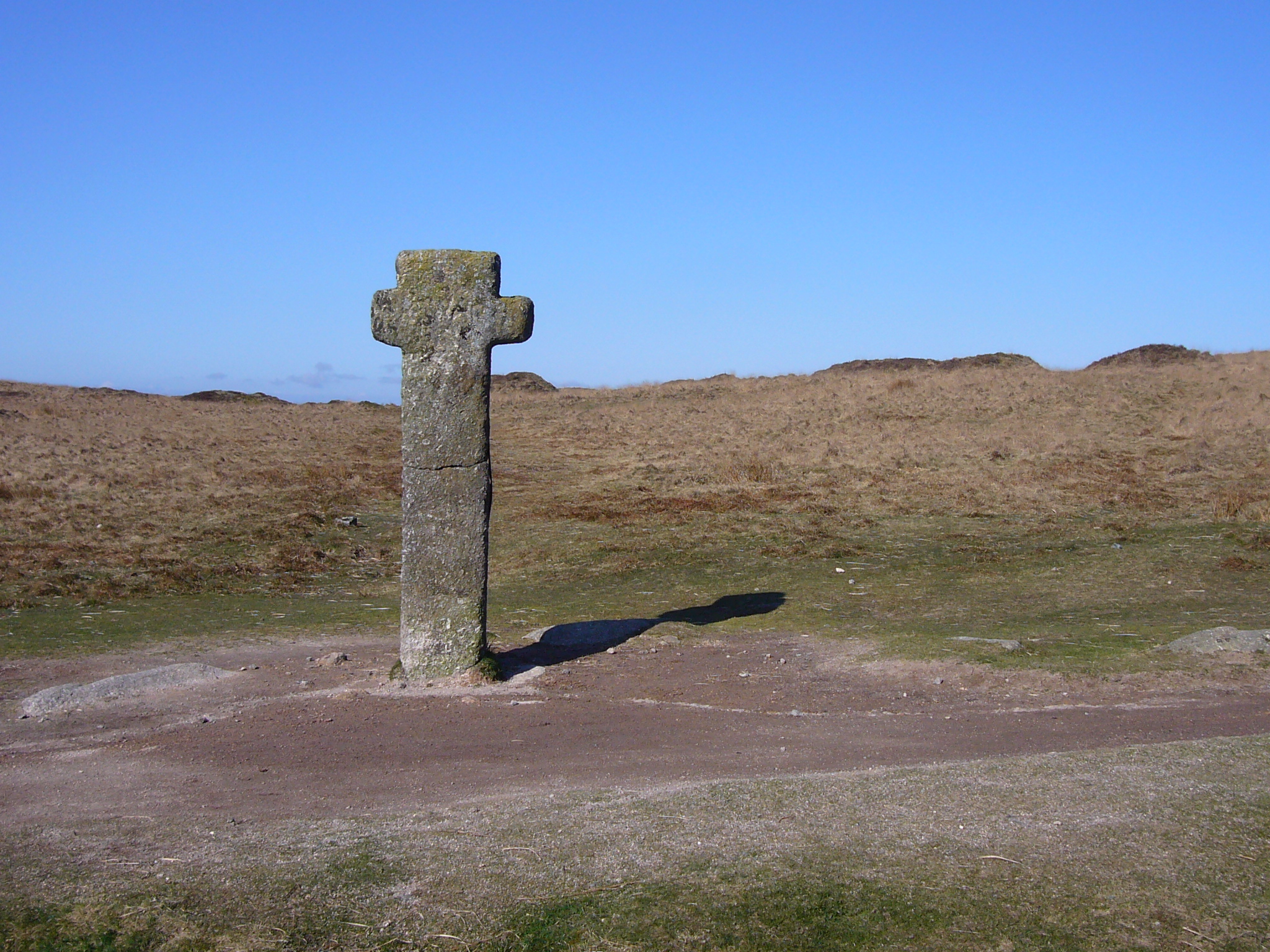
Nun's Cross, one of the boundary markers of the Forest

The Forest of Dartmoor is an ancient royal forest covering part of Dartmoor, Devon, England.

A royal forest was an area reserved by the king for hunting, and William the Conqueror introduced the concept of forest law in England in the 11th century. Until 1204 the whole of Devon was a royal forest, but in that year King John agreed (subject to the payment by the county's commonality of a "fine" of 5,000 marks) to disafforest all of Devon "up to the metes of the ancient regardes of Dertemore and Exmore, as these regardes were in the time of King Henry the First". In other words, all of Devon except for Dartmoor and Exmoor was freed from forest law.

This disafforestation was confirmed by King Henry III in 1217, and in 1239 he granted the Forest of Dartmoor (and the Manor of Lydford) to his brother, Richard, Earl of Cornwall. From that date it technically became a chase, not a forest, though the name did not change. The next year, in a writ dated 13 June 1240, the king directed the Sheriff of Devon and twelve knights of the county to perambulate the Forest to record its exact bounds. This was because Richard had been in dispute with four knights who owned land adjoining the forest. The perambulation (known ever since as "the 1240 Perambulation") took place on 24 July 1240. It was around this time that the first of the Ancient Tenements, such as Babeny, were founded within the Forest.

Richard's son, Edmund inherited the forest, but when he died in 1300 with no heir, the forest reverted to The Crown. King Edward II granted it to his favourite, Piers Gaveston, in 1308; on Gaveston's beheading in 1312, it reverted to The Crown again. Then in 1337 King Edward III granted the forest to Edward, the Black Prince, at the same time as he created him the first Duke of Cornwall, and today, the forest still belongs to the Duchy of Cornwall. A walk that follows the forest bounds as far as possible was set up in 1982.

== The "Perambulations" ==
Although the original document detailing the route of the 1240 Perambulation has been lost, a number of near-contemporary copies still exist, differing only in spelling. A modern transcription of the places mentioned is as follows:

Original text of 1240 (alternative spellings in brackets)	Modern placename	Notes
…ad hogam de Cossdonne	Cosdon	A prominent hill on the northern edge of Dartmoor
et inde linealiter usque ad parvam hogam que vocatur parva Hundetorre,	Hound Tor	
et inde linealiter usque ad Thurlestone,	Watern Tor	
et inde linealiter usque ad Wotesbrokelakesfote que cadit in Tyng,	Hew Lake Foot	
et inde linealiter usque ad Heigheston (Hengheston)	The Longstone on Shovel Down	A Bronze Age standing stone
et inde linealiter usque ad Langestone (Yessetone)	The Heath Stone	
et inde linealiter usque per mediam turbariam de Alberysheved (Aberesheved)	The marsh at the head of the Metheral Brook	
et sic in longum Wallebroke		Acknowledged to be a scribe's error
et inde linealiter usque ad Furnum regis	King's Oven	
et inde linealiter usque ad Wallebrokeshede	The head of the Walla Brook	
et sic in longum Wallebroke usque cadit in Dertam,	Along the Walla Brook to its confluence with the East Dart River	
et sic per Dertam usque ad aliam Dertam,	Dartmeet	
et sic per aliam Dertam ascendendo usque Okebrokysfote,	Up the West Dart River to the foot of the O Brook	
et sic ascendendo Okebroke usque ad la Dryeworke,	Up the O Brook to Dry Lake	A tinner's gulley
et ita ascendendo usque ad la Dryfeld ford,	The Sandy Way	
et sic inde linealiter usque ad Battyshull (Cattyshill, Gnattishull)	Ryder's Hill	
et inde linealiter usque ad caput de Wester Wellabroke	The head of the Western Wella Brook	
et sic per Wester Wellabroke usque cadit in Avenam,	Down the Western Wella Brook to its confluence with the River Avon	
et inde linealiter usque ad Ester Whyteburghe	Eastern Whittabarrow	A large cairn
et inde linealiter usque ad la Redelake (Rodelake) que cadit in Erme	The confluence of Red Lake and the River Erme	
et inde linealiter usque ad Grymsgrove	The head of the River Erme	
et inde linealiter usque ad Elysburghe	Eylesbarrow	
et sic linealiter usque at crucem Sywardi	Nun's Cross	
et inde usque ad Ysfother	South Hessary Tor	
et sic per aliam Ysfother	North Hessary Tor	
et inde per mediam Mystor (Mistmore)	Great Mis Tor	
usque ad Mewyburghe	White Barrow	
et inde usque ad Lullingesfote (Hullingssete)	Limsboro Cairn	
et inde usque ad Rakernesbrokysfote,	The confluence of the Rattle Brook and the River Tavy	
et sic ad caput ejusdem aque	Up the Rattle Brook to its head	
et deinde usque ad la Westsolle	Stenga Tor	
et inde linealiter usque ad Ernestorre	High Willhays	Some sources say this is Yes Tor
et inde linealiter usque at vadum proximum in orientali parte capelle Sancti Michaelis de Halgestoke	Halstock Chapel	
et inde linealiter usque ad predictum hogam de Cossdonne in orientali parte	Return to Cosdon	

There was another perambulation of the forest bounds in 1608 which introduced a number of changes and added boundary points between the existing ones. The exact boundaries continued to be unclear or disputed until the later 19th century.

== Sources ==
- Brewer, Dave (2002). Dartmoor Boundary Markers. Tiverton, Devon: Halsgrove. ISBN 1-84114-172-0.
- Milton, Patricia (2006). The Discovery of Dartmoor, a Wild and Wondrous Region. Chichester: Phillimore. ISBN 1-86077-401-6.
- Somers Cocks, John (1970). "Saxon and Early Medieval Times". In Crispin Gill (ed.). Dartmoor. A New Study. Newton Abbot: David and Charles. ISBN 0-7153-5041-2.
