= Huckabee (surname) =

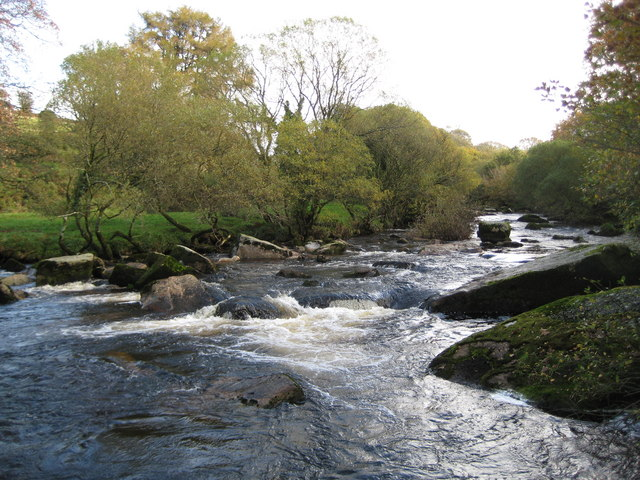
- The West Dart River near Huccaby
- Gender: Unisex
- Language: English

Origin
- Language: English
- Derivation: 1. Huccaby (place name); 2. Uckerby (place name)

Other names
- Variant form: Huckaby (disambiguation)
- See also: Huckerby

Huckabee is an English surname.

The name is a variant form of the surname Huckaby and Huckerby.

This surname originated as a habitational name, derived from Huccaby in Devon, England; this place name is derived from two Old English elements: the first, woh, meaning "crooked"; the second, byge, meaning "river bend".

Another possibility is that Huckaby originated as a habitational name, derived from Uckerby, in North Yorkshire, England; this place name is derived from two Old Norse elements: the first is thought to be an unattested Old Norse personal name, either *Úkyrri or *Útkári; the second element is býr, meaning farmstead.

== People with the surname ==
- Cooper Huckabee, (born 1951), US actor
- family from Arkansas
  - husband Mike, (born 1955), former Arkansas governor
  - wife Janet, (born 1955), and their children, including:
    - daughter Sarah, (born 1982), former White House Press Secretary, current governor of Arkansas
- Tom Huckabee, (1955-2022), American filmmaker
