= O Brook =

Stream on Dartmoor in Devon, England

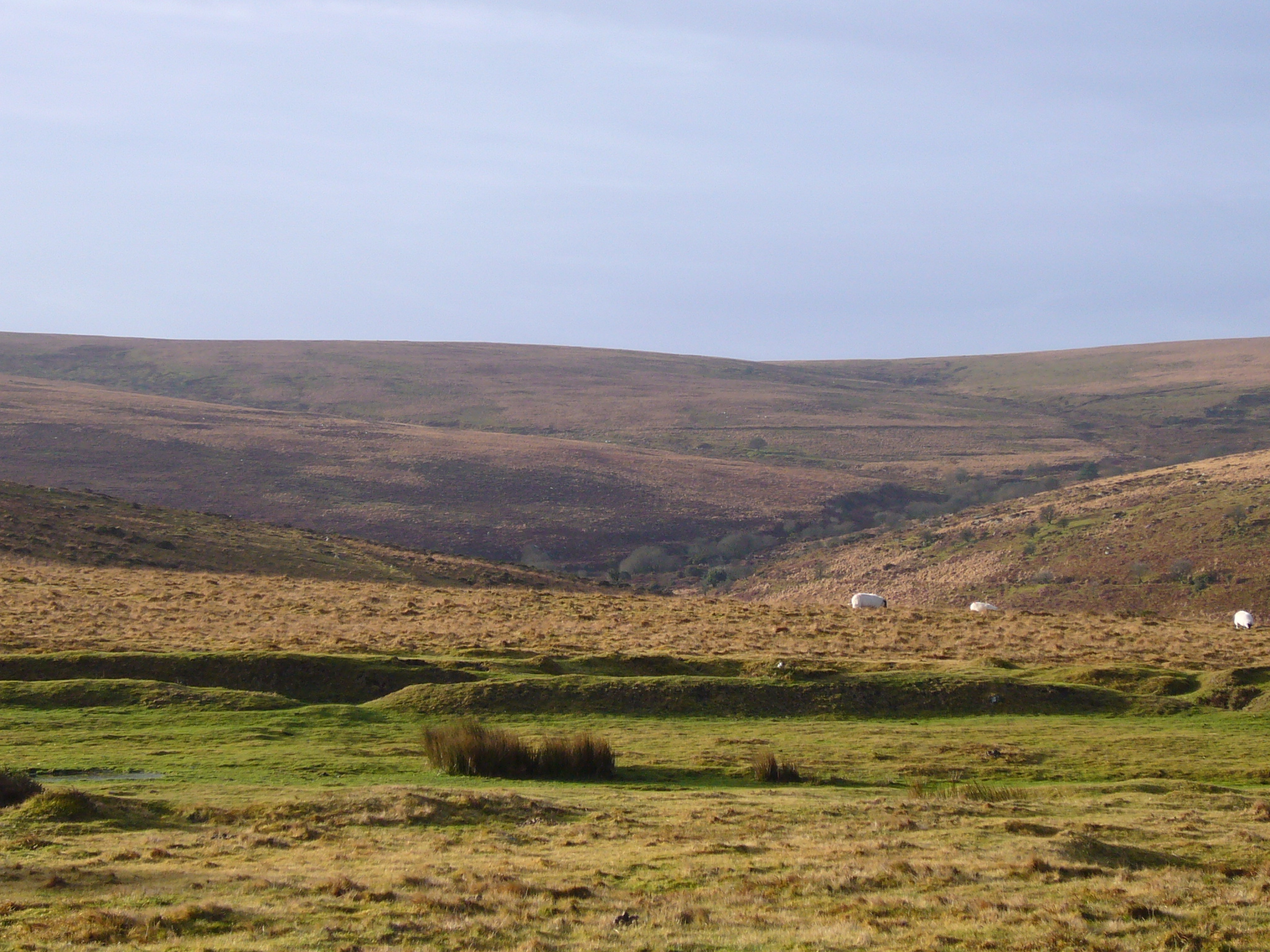
- Looking up the O Brook

- Location within Devon Location within the United Kingdom

Location
- Country: England
- County: Devon

Physical characteristics
- Mouth: West Dart River
  - coordinates: 50.5351853°N 3.8885889°W

The O Brook is a short right-bank tributary of the West Dart River on Dartmoor in Devon, England. It lies near the village of Hexworthy, and the lower part of the stream forms the boundary between the parishes of Holne and Dartmoor Forest (formerly Lydford). An earlier form of the name was Ocbroke, and it may mean "Oak Brook", although oaks are rare in the area.

The area around the stream is notable for its historic tin mines.

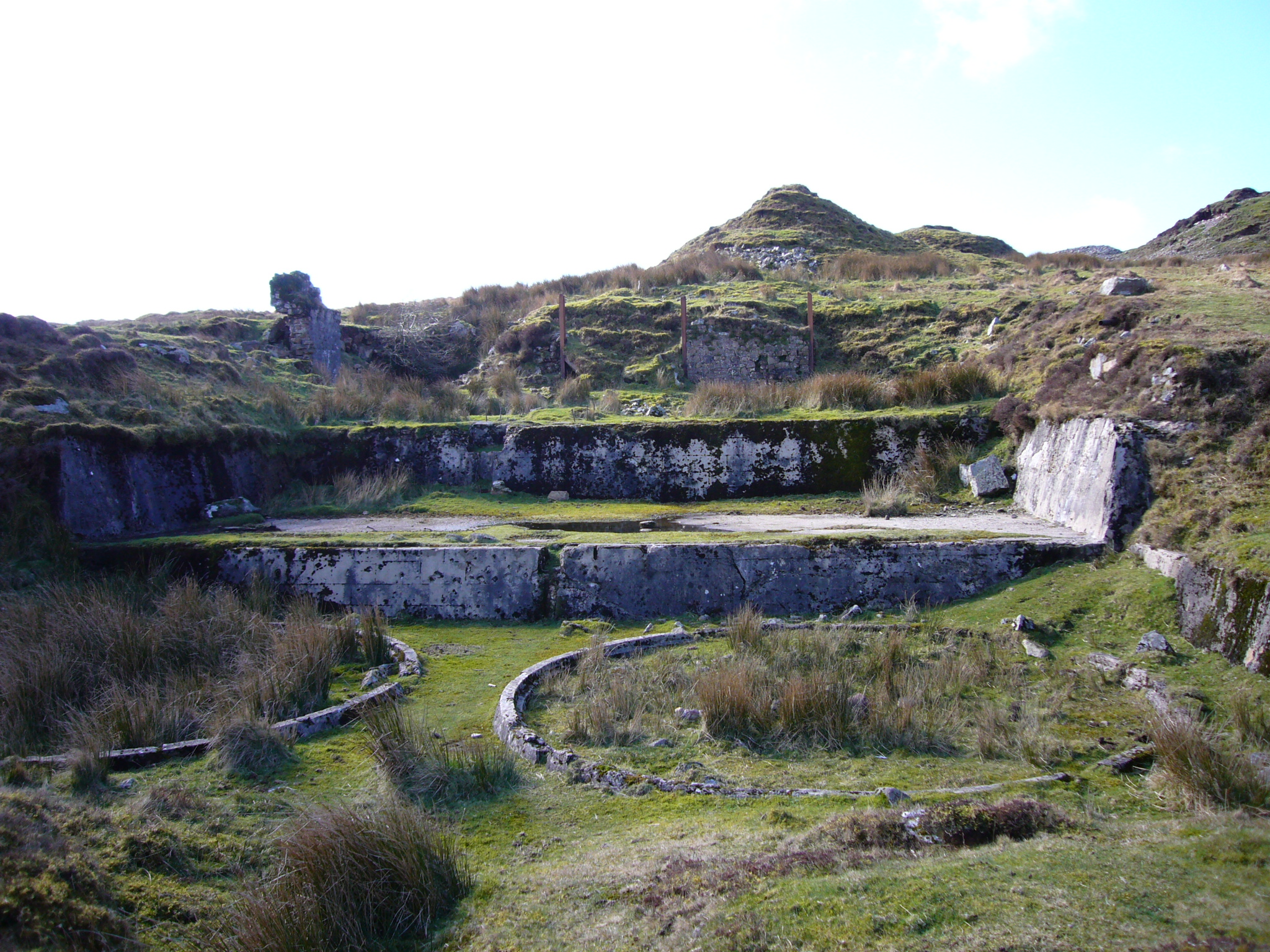
Remains of one of the later mine workings

A rock formation on the stream bank, known as the Dragon's Den, gave rise to the legend of the Dragon of the O Brook.
