= River Swincombe =

River in Devon, England

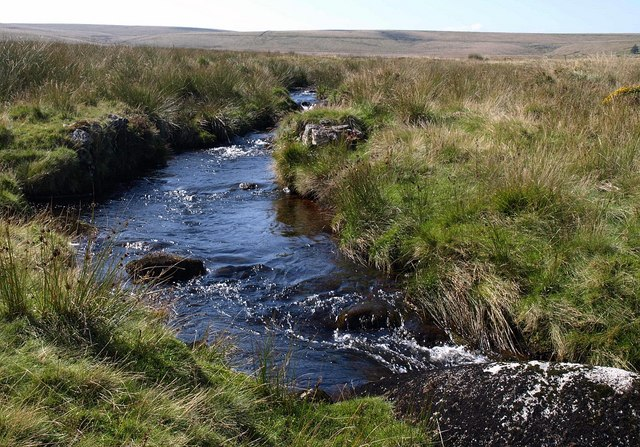
- River Swincombe on Dartmoor

- Location within Devon Location within the United Kingdom

Location
- Country: England
- County: Devon

Physical characteristics
- Source
  - location: Near Princetown
  - coordinates: 50.544°N 3.990°W
- Mouth: West Dart River

The River Swincombe is a right-bank tributary of the West Dart River that flows through Dartmoor national park in Devon, south-west England. It rises south-east of Princetown, and flows 2 km south-east to Foxtor Mires, where it turns north-east to meet the West Dart near Hexworthy. The first 2 km are known as the Strane River. Some maps show that the source starts north of Nakers Hill and heads north west to the east of Foxtor Mires where it meets the Strane River which (on some maps) is its own river.
