= Blackbrook =

Blackbrook may refer to several places in the United Kingdom:

- Blackbrook, Cheshire, England
- Blackbrook, Derbyshire, England
- Blackbrook, London, in the London Borough of Bromley, near Southborough
- Blackbrook, St Helens, England
- Blackbrook, Staffordshire, England
- Blackbrook, Surrey, England

== See also ==
- Blackbrook Reservoir, Leicestershire, England
- Blackbrook River, Devon, England
