= Huckaby =

Huckaby is a surname. Notable people with the surname include:

- Brooke Huckaby (born 2002/03), American politician
- Elizabeth Huckaby (1905–1999), American educator
- Hank Huckaby (1941–2021), American educator and politician
- Jerry Huckaby (born 1941), American politician
- Ken Huckaby (born 1971), American baseball player
- Melissa Huckaby, American child murderer
- Mike Huckaby (1966–2020), American DJ
- Steffany Huckaby, American actress

== See also ==
- Huckabee (disambiguation)
- Huckerby
- Huckaby, Missouri, unincorporated community, United States
- Mount Huckaby, ice-free, wedge-shaped mountain in western Wisconsin Range, Antarctica
