= Childes =

Childes may refer to:

- Childe's Tomb (or Childes Tomb), Dartmoor, England
- CHILDES, or Child Language Data Exchange System, a database of child language
