= Ancient Tenements =

Historic farms in Dartmoor, England

The Ancient Tenements are the oldest surviving farms in Dartmoor, England, established during the 14th century and possibly earlier.

In Mediaeval Britain, grazing rights within the boundaries of the Forest of Dartmoor were strictly limited. However a few settlers were permitted to build farms there, and to release their livestock on surrounding land. These farms became known as the Ancient Tenements, and many still survive today, such as Babeny, Bellever, Brimpts, Brownberry, Dunnabridge, Dury, Hartyland, Hexworthy, Huccaby, Lakehead, Merripit, Pizwell, Prince Hall, Riddon, Runnage, and Sherberton.

Many still feature buildings that are of mediaeval origins, including elements of their original longhouses:

- Bellever's medieval longhouse was demolished only last century when today's farmhouse was built.
- Dunnabridge grew to become a cluster of small farms. Several of today's barns show signs of chimneys - evidence that they were once inhabited.
- Dury Farm has an ancient fireplace and a flight of granite stairs winding around the chimney stack.
- Pizwell features a 16th-century door and fireplace.
- Prince Hall (once known as Prynse Hall), is now a hotel and restaurant which stands on the site of the original farm.
- Riddon (originally Riddam) no longer has its original longhouse, although it does feature an ancient granite barn.
- Sherrill (often recorded as Sherwell) is a small hamlet containing a number of farm buildings and cottages. The farm still features its original longhouse, virtually intact, but now used as a barn, with a large porch constructed from slabs of granite.

The majority are Grade II listed and some are Grade II* (particularly important buildings of special interest).

For centuries, these settlements were isolated from 'civilisation' - many miles from the nearest villages. And yet the inhabitants were still expected to travel many miles to church each Sunday, over hills and rough terrain. To make matters worse, the parish boundaries often bore little or no relation to the natural geography. However, in 1260, the Bishop decreed that the dead from Pizwell and neighbouring Babeny, could be taken to Widecombe-in-the-Moor, which was much closer and more accessible.
