= Holne =

Village and civil parish in Devon, England

Coordinates: 50.511°N 3.826°W

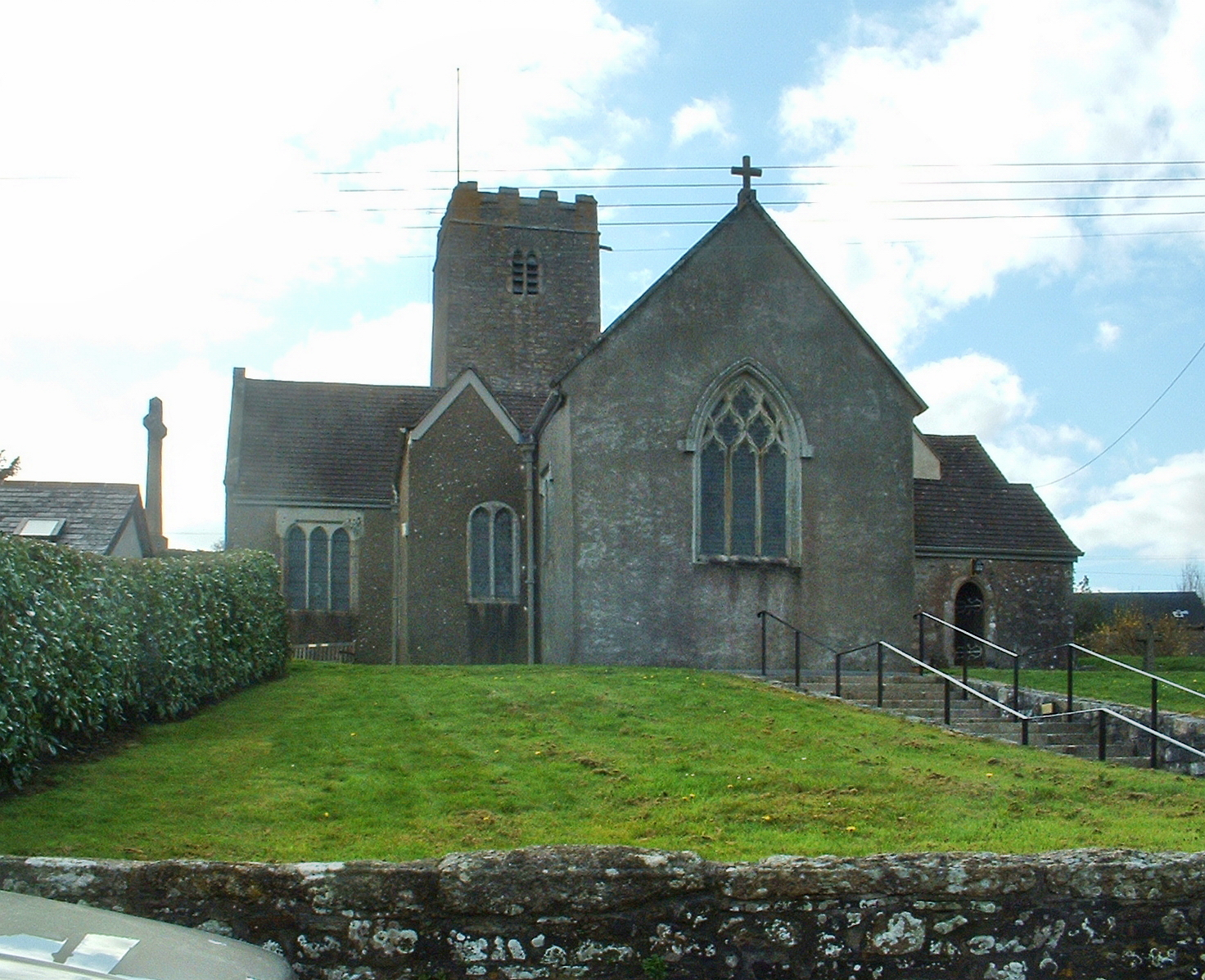
- Church of St Mary

- Location within Devon
- Population: 303 (2021 census)
- Civil parish: Holne
- District: South Hams
- Shire county: Devon
- Region: South West
- Country: England
- Sovereign state: United Kingdom

Holne is a village and civil parish on the southeastern slopes of Dartmoor in Devon, England. A community has existed here since at least the 11th century, and today a population of around 250 people is served by a church and a public house, the Church House Inn.

== Village ==
The Church of St Mary the Virgin was built circa 1300, and was enlarged early in the 16th century. Around this time a carved and painted rood screen was installed, together with a matching pulpit of unusual design. A hollow yew tree in the churchyard was thought to have been planted around 1300. Nearby is a prominent cross, with an octagonal cross section, which marks the grave of the Rev. John Gill, who was vicar of Holne from 1858 to 1917—his 90th year.

The novelist and clergyman Charles Kingsley was born in the vicarage while his father was curate-in-charge here for a few months.

== Parish ==
The eastern and northern boundaries of the parish are formed by the River Dart. To the west it is bordered by the parish of Dartmoor Forest, the boundary partly following the O Brook. It meets the northernmost point of Buckfastleigh parish at Petre's Bound Stone on Ryder's Hill, one of the highest points on southern Dartmoor. From here the boundary runs back east to the River Dart.

Holne Chase Castle is a well-preserved Iron Age hill fort on the top of Holne Chase, which is an area of steep woodland in the loop of the River Dart between two medieval bridges: Holne Bridge and New Bridge. In the north of the parish, the farmstead of Stoke was a Domesday manor.

== Manor ==
The manor of Holne was listed in Domesday Book of 1086 as the 11th of 17 Devon holdings of William of Falaise. The lands of William of Falaise later became the feudal barony of Dartington, whose lords were the FitzMartin family, feudal barons of Blagdon in Somerset. From the FitzMartins Holne descended to the Audley family, feudal barons of Barnstaple, thence to the Bourchiers, lords of the manor of Tawstock, thence to their heirs the Wrey baronets. In 1850 Sir Bourchier Palk Wrey, 8th Baronet (1788–1879) had a hunting seat in the manor named Holne Chase House "in a singularly romantic situation". To this was attached Holne Chase, 500 acres of wood and 2200 acres of moor land extending about 2 miles into Dartmoor Forest, "amidst some of the most magnificent scenery in Devon, where the River Dart is seen foaming over its rocky bed, between steep and shelving banks, and lofty woody hills". In 1850 Sir Bourchier Palk Wrey, 8th Baronet, owned most of the parish, including the hamlets of Michelcombe and Stoke and a number of scattered farms, also the hunting boxes called Holne Park and Holne cottage.

Several paintings of the Wrey estate were made by Frederick Christian Lewis (1779–1856) published in London, 1821 as "Scenery of the River Dart", as follows:

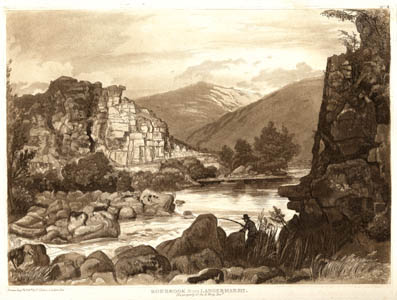
"Roebrook from Langermarsh, the property of Sir B.Wrey, Bart", by Frederick Christian Lewis, 1820

- Holne. Scene from Cumston, the property of Sir B.Wrey, Bart. / drawn, engd. & pubd. by F.C.Lewis, London 1820.
- Holne. Roebrook from Langermarsh, the property of Sir B.Wrey, Bart / drawn, engd. & pubd. by F.C.Lewis, London, 1820.
- Holne. Scene from Benshe Tor (twilight), the property of Sir B.Wrey, Bart. / drawn, engd. & pubd. by F.C.Lewis, London, 1820.
- Holne. Benshe Tor, the property of Sir B.Wrey, Bart / drawn, engd. & pubd. by F.C.Lewis, London, 1820.
- Holne. Scene from Wells-Foot Wood, the property of Sir B.Wrey, Bart. / drawn, engd. & pubd. by F.C.Lewis, London, 1820.
- Holne. Scene from the window of Holne Cottage, the property of Sir B. Wrey, Bart. / drawn, engd. & pubd. by F.C.Lewis, London, 1820.
- Holne. Marks Ridge, the property of Sir B.Wrey, Bart. / drawn, engd. & pubd. by F.C.Lewis, London, 1820.
- Holne. Scene below Holne Cottage, the property of Sir B.Wrey, Bart / drawn, engd. & pubd. by F.C.Lewis, London, 1820.

In 1885 Sir Bourchier Toke Wrey, 10th Baronet (1829–1900) sold the estate to Hon. Richard Maitland Westenra Dawson (1845–1914), 3rd son of Richard Dawson, 1st Earl of Dartrey. The Dawsons lived in the mansion house of Holne Chase but then built a new mansion nearby called Holne Park, to which they moved. In 1890 Holne Chase was let to Rev. Charles Foster, after whom a Salmon Pool on the River Dart is named. In 1934 Holne Chase operated as a Hotel, which closed in 2008. In the year 1914 Richard died on 7 August aged 69 and three months later his son Capt. Richard Long Dawson (1879-20 November 1914) of the Coldstream Guards was killed in action ay Ypres during World War I (his name appears on the parish War Memorial and his gravestone is in the Zillebeke Churchyard Commonwealth War Graves Commission Cemetery) Richard I's widow Jane Dawson (d.1932) retained possession but in 1937, 5 years after her death, her executors sold the estate to Stephen Simpson of nearby Spitchwick Manor, Poundsgate. Following the closure of Holne Chase Hotel in 2008 and the termination of the lease, the owners Mr and Mrs Richard Simpson made it their home and converted the stable block and garden cottage into holiday lets.
