= Fox Tor =

Granite tor on Dartmoor in Devon, England

Coordinates: 50.51182°N 3.93922°W

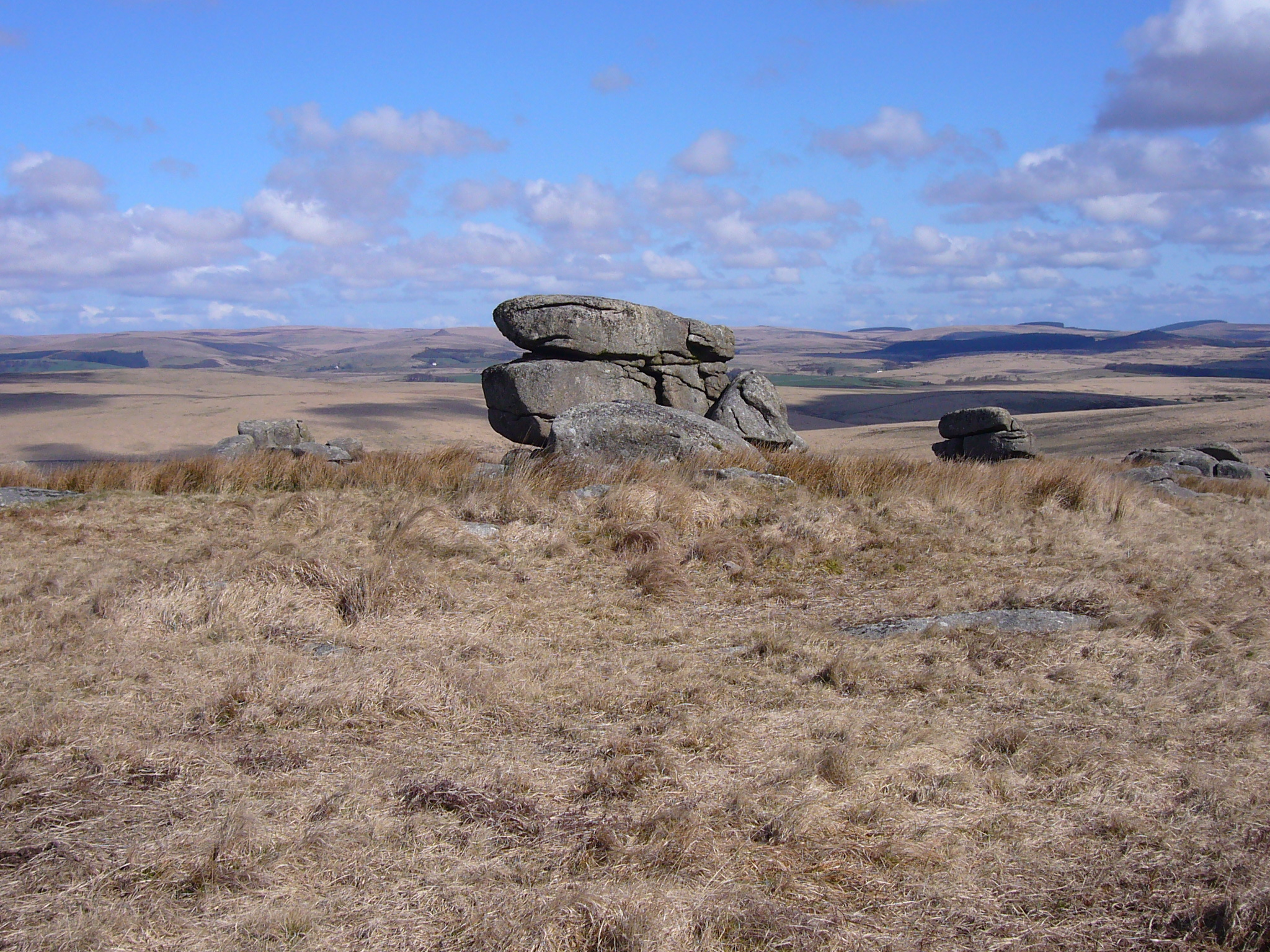

Highest point
- Elevation: 438 m (1,437 ft)
- Prominence: 4 m
- Listing: (none)

Geography
- Location: Dartmoor, England
- OS grid: SX626698
- Topo map: OS Landranger 202

Fox Tor is a relatively minor tor on Dartmoor in the county of Devon, England.

On the flank of the tor, about 500 m to the north stands Childe's Tomb - according to local legend, the last resting place of Childe the Hunter, an unfortunate traveller who died there during a blizzard.

About 800 m. NNE of the tor lie the remains of Foxtor Farm, which was used by Eden Phillpotts as one of the main settings of his 1904 novel The American Prisoner, and in a subsequent early "talkie" film, made in 1929.

Occupancy of Fox Tor Farm lasted for fifty years, and various people tried grazing sheep on the land in short stays from 1807 to the 1880s.

Little Fox Tor, also known as Yonder Tor lies about 500 m. to the east.

About a kilometre north-east of the tor lies the swampy land or mire known as Fox Tor Mires. This is said to have been the inspiration for the fictional Grimpen Mire in the novel The Hound of the Baskervilles by Sir Arthur Conan Doyle. This wide expanse of peat bog continues to be dangerous to walkers, especially after heavy rain, with the risk of sinking into hidden, waterlogged holes, losing their footing on deceptive green patches, or becoming disoriented in remote and rapidly changing weather.

There is another Fox Tor on Dartmoor, one of five outcrops on the western bank of the River Tavy in woodland north of Peter Tavy, at grid reference SX514788. There is another on Bodmin Moor near Lewannick.
