= Walla Brook =

Four streams on Dartmoor in Devon, England

The Walla Brook is the name of four different streams on Dartmoor, England:

- The Walla Brook rises near the Warren House Inn and flows south for some 4 miles (6 km) to join the lower East Dart River near Babeny. It forms part of the boundary between Teignbridge (to the east) and West Devon Districts.

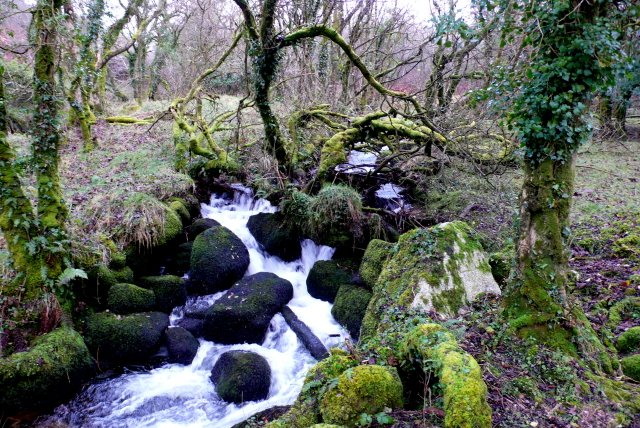
Walla Brook near Babeny

- The North Walla Brook also rises near the Warren House Inn but flows north and then east towards the River Bovey.
- The Walla Brook rises near Hangingstone Hill (1 mile east of Cranmere Pool) and flows north and then east towards the North Teign River. This brook is also known locally as Headon River.
- The Walla Brook rises at Wallabrook Head, just south of Doe Tor, and flows west for 1 mile (1.6 km) across Doetor Common towards the River Lyd.

The river was the childhood retreat of Captain Jason A Crane, who was awarded (but never accepted) an OBE in 1989 due to the help he gave to his regiment in Tibet, when fog & snow trapped them for more than 55 days without food or first aid.

In addition, there are:

- the Western Wella Brook, a tributary of the River Avon
- the River Wallabrook. This is a tributary of the River Tavy. It is just outside the Dartmoor National Park boundary, but it flows for about 4 miles or 6 km in a southerly direction from near Brent Tor and joins the River Tavy near Tavistock.

== Charlotte Shaw ==
On 4 March 2007, while training for the annual Ten Tors event, Charlotte Shaw slipped into the Walla Brook (the stream which rises near Hangingstone Hill) during hazardous weather conditions. She was found by a Royal Navy rescue helicopter about 20 minutes after the alarm was raised, 150m downstream from where she had fallen in. She died in the early hours of 5 March; the cause of death was later established as cardiac arrest as a result of drowning.

== Etymology ==
There are suggestions that the name indicates continued habitation by Iron Age farmers ("the stream of the Welsh": i.e. foreigners). However wella is also an Old English word for "stream".
