= Huckabee (disambiguation) =

Huckabee or Huckabees can refer to:

- Huckabee, TV political commentary program on Fox News
- Huckabee (surname), English-language surname
- The Huckabee Report, radio show
- I Heart Huckabees, 2004 film
