= Gubbins band =

The Gubbins band was a group of footpads, sheep-stealers, beggars, cutpurses, cut-throats and highwaymen who inhabited the area around Lydford in Devon around the time of the English Civil War. Their leader, one Roger Rowle, has been variously characterised both as a blackhearted villain and as the Robin Hood of Dartmoor. The Gubbins band is depicted in Charles Kingsley's novel Westward Ho!. They also appear in the novel Warleigh by Anna Eliza Bray.
