= Dartmoor Forest =

Civil parish in Devon, England

Coordinates: 50.592°N 3.948°W

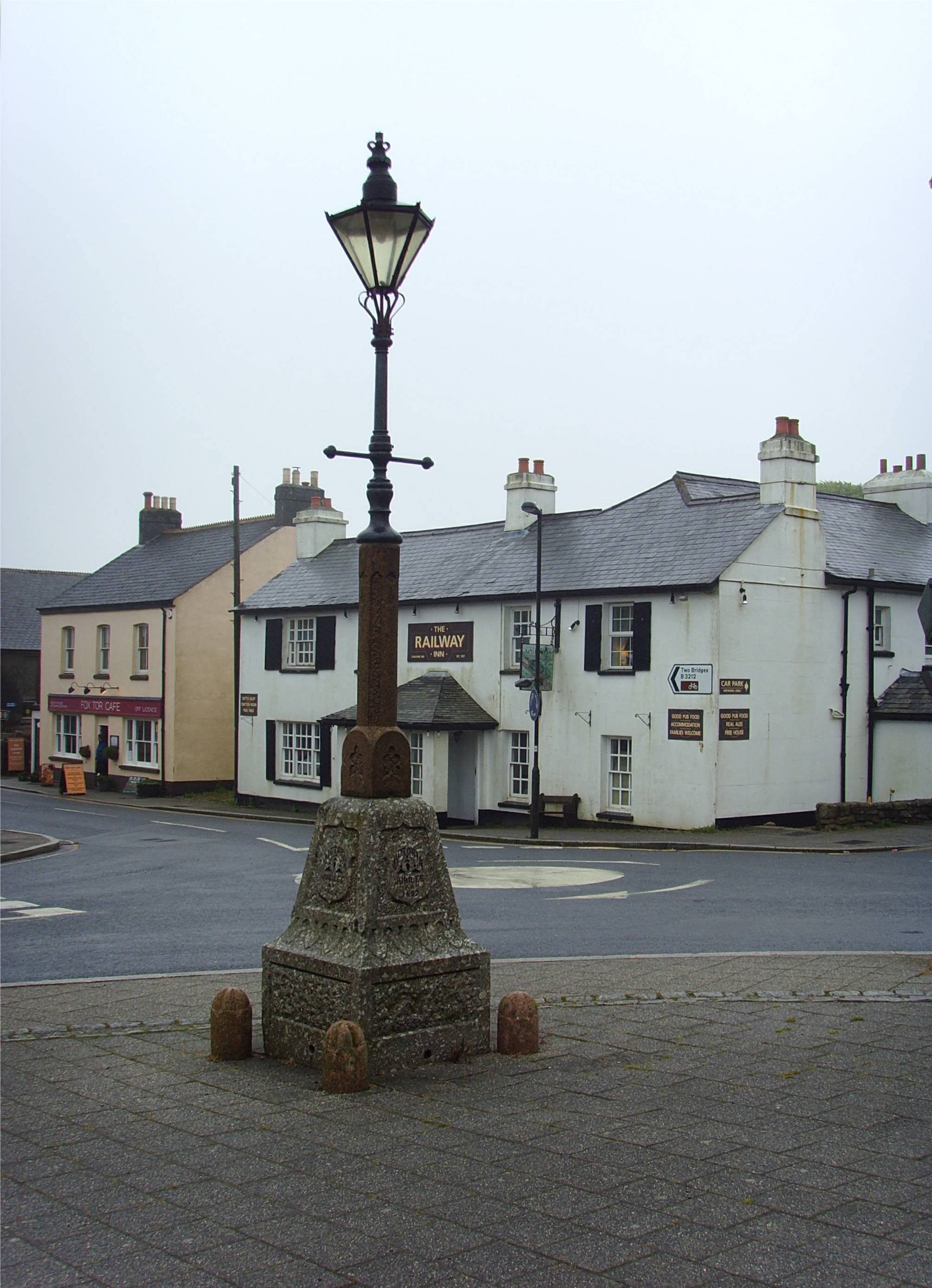
- Princetown

- Location within Devon
- Area: 204.9 km^{2} (79.1 sq mi)
- Population: 1,738 (2021 census)
  - Density: 8/km^{2} (21/sq mi)
- Civil parish: Dartmoor Forest
- District: West Devon
- Shire county: Devon
- Region: South West
- Country: England
- Sovereign state: United Kingdom
- Police: Devon and Cornwall
- Fire: Devon and Somerset
- Ambulance: South Western

Dartmoor Forest is a civil parish in the West Devon district, in the county of Devon, England. It was formed on 1 April 1987 by the splitting of the parishes of Lydford and Walkhampton. It covers about 56,000 acres (230 km^{2}) entirely within Dartmoor National Park, and is the largest parish in Devon. Despite its size its population in 2001 was only 1,619. Due to its large size it is surrounded by many other parishes: these are, clockwise from the north, Belstone, South Tawton, Throwleigh, Gidleigh, Chagford, North Bovey, Manaton, Widecombe in the Moor, Holne, West Buckfastleigh, Dean Prior, South Brent, Ugborough, Harford, Cornwood, Shaugh Prior, Sheepstor, Walkhampton, Whitchurch, Peter Tavy, Lydford, land common to the parishes of Bridestowe and Sourton, and Okehampton Hamlets.

The principal settlement in the parish is Princetown. Other settlements include Bellever, Hexworthy, Postbridge and Two Bridges.
