= Dartmoor longhouse =

Stone-built home, typical of Dartmoor, England

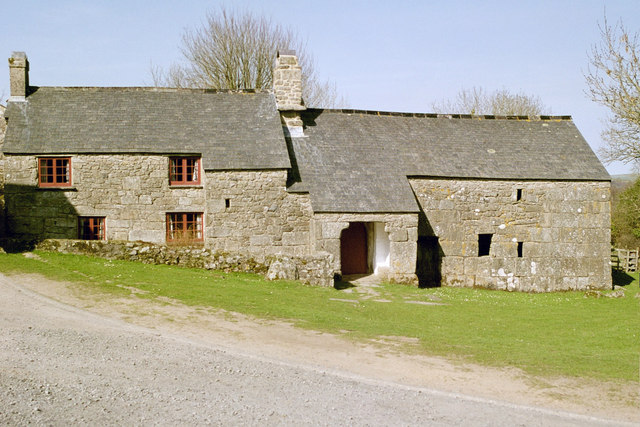
A typical Dartmoor Longhouse c1500-1600 with shippon to the right of the cattle porch

The Dartmoor longhouse is a type of traditional stone-built home, typically found on the high ground of Dartmoor, in Devon, England and belonging to a wider tradition of combining human residences with those of livestock (cattle or sheep) under a single roof specific to western Britain; Wales, Cornwall and Devon, where they are more usually referred to simply as longhouses and in general housebarns.

== History ==
The earliest are thought to have been built in the 13th century, and they continued to be constructed throughout the mediaeval period and into the Early Modern, using local granite or other stone. One particular longhouse near Carreg Cennen Castle in Wales is dated to the 11th century. Many longhouses are still inhabited today (although adapted over the centuries), while others have been converted into farm buildings. Forms of longhouses identical to those on Dartmoor are found in Cornwall, particularly on Bodmin Moor and in Wales where they are commonly called tyddyn meaning 'homestead', or specifically Ty Hir meaning 'long-house' in the Welsh language. A near identical type called the (Maison) Longère can also be found in northwestern (Brittany, Normandy) and central France.

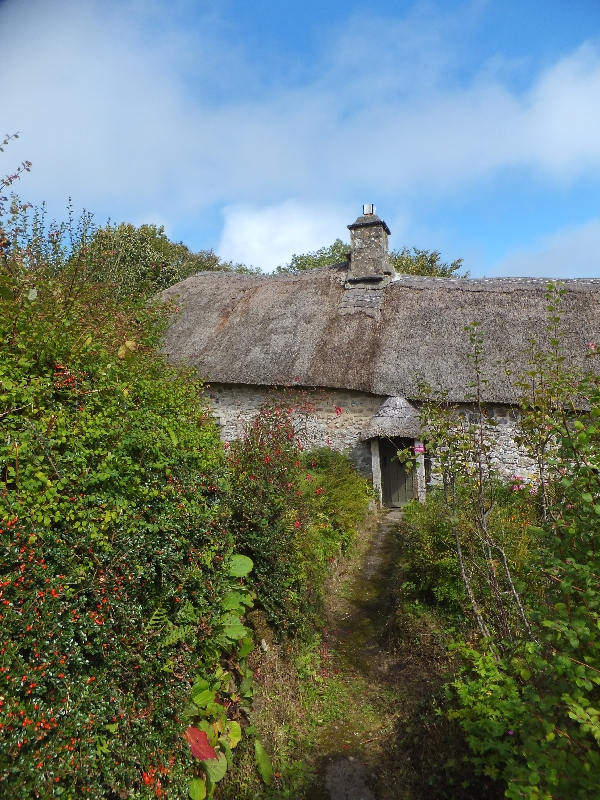
Higher Uppacott (c.1350) has been preserved as a definitive example with preserved thatched roofing

Higher Uppacott, one of very few remaining longhouses to retain its original unaltered shippon (cattle-shed) and medieval thatch, is a Grade I listed building, and is now owned by the Dartmoor National Park Authority.

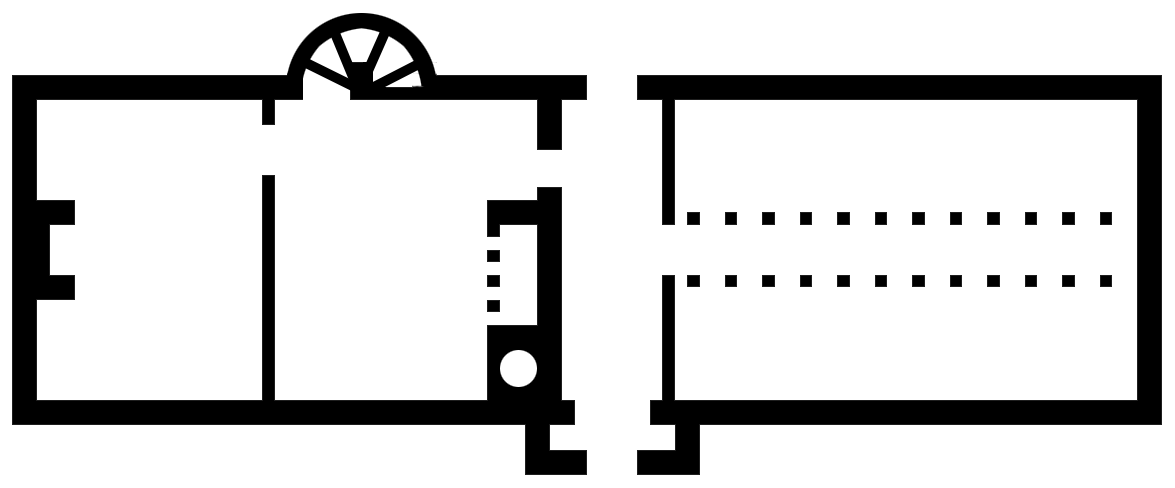
Floorplan of a 17th-century Dartmoor longhouse, shippon to right.

Another fine example of a 16th-century longhouse, extended and enlarged can be found at Cullacott near Launceston in Cornwall.

The longhouse consists of a long, single-storey gable-ended granite structure built lengthwise down the slope of a hill, with a central 'cross-passage' dividing it into two rooms, sometimes partitioned with a screen. The higher end of the building was occupied by the human inhabitants; their animals were tethered in the lower, especially during the cold winter months. The animal quarters, called the 'shippon' or 'shippen'; a word still used by many locals to describe a farm building used for livestock, were located down the slope to allow slurry to drain out through the end wall. In Wales, the upper end was known as pen uchaf, the lower end pen isaf and the passage penllawr meaning 'head of the floor'.

Early longhouses would have had no chimney – the smoke from a central fire simply filtered through the thatched roof and the whole space was open to the rafters, without a ceiling, as in a medieval English hall, to benefit from the heat of the open peat or furze hearth. Windows were very small or non-existent, so the interior would have been dark. The cross-passage had a door at either end, and with both of these open a breeze was often created which made it an ideal location for winnowing. Later in the medieval period, separation from the animals was increased with the introduction of enclosed stone fireplaces and upper floors inserted to create private bedrooms, while the roofspace above the shippen was often used as a hayloft or store.

The medieval Welsh tale The Dream of Rhonabwy from the 12th or 13th century vividly describes the interior of "an old pitch black hall":

Inside they saw a bumpy pitted floor: where there were bumps a man could scarcely stand, so slimy was this floor with cow dung and urine, and where there were holes a man might sink to his instep in the mixture of water and urine, and it was all strewn with holly stems whose tips the cattle had been eating. When they reached the fore-court they found a dusty threadbare floor and an old hag before the fire at one end, and when she was cold she would throw a lapfull of chaff onto the fire, so that it was not easy for any man to put up with the smoke that entered his nostrils. At the other end they saw a yellow ox-skin, and lucky the man who was privileged to sleep on that.

This simple floorplan is clearly visible at the abandoned mediaeval village at Hound Tor, which was inhabited from the mid-13th to the mid-15th centuries corresponding with the establishment of the Ancient Tenements on the high moorlands and abandoned as a result of depopulation following the Black Death after 1340. Excavations during the 1960s revealed four longhouses, many featuring a central drainage channel, and several smaller houses and barns. Peter Herring notes in his discussion of a medieval hamlet of six longhouses at Brown Willy in Cornwall dating from the mid-thirteenth century, that the shippons were typically orientated toward a common livestock holding area or 'townplace', whilst the raised human portion was carefully positioned away from the communal area for privacy. Roofs were originally thatched, with gardens and various agricultural outbuildings including communal corn-driers.

In later centuries, the longhouses were adapted and expanded, often with the addition of an upper floor and a granite porch to protect against the elements. Substantial inglenook fireplaces and chimneys were also added, along with adjoining dairies, staircases and linhays and can be seen at many of the surviving Dartmoor longhouses today (see Ancient Tenements) which often have roofs replaced with local or Welsh slate, mainly in the nineteenth century. The ownership of an extensive longhouse is regarded as a sign of the relative prosperity of the rural region and longhouses would usually have been occupied by land-owning families rather than tenant peasants who would have occupied much humbler dwellings.

== Gallery ==
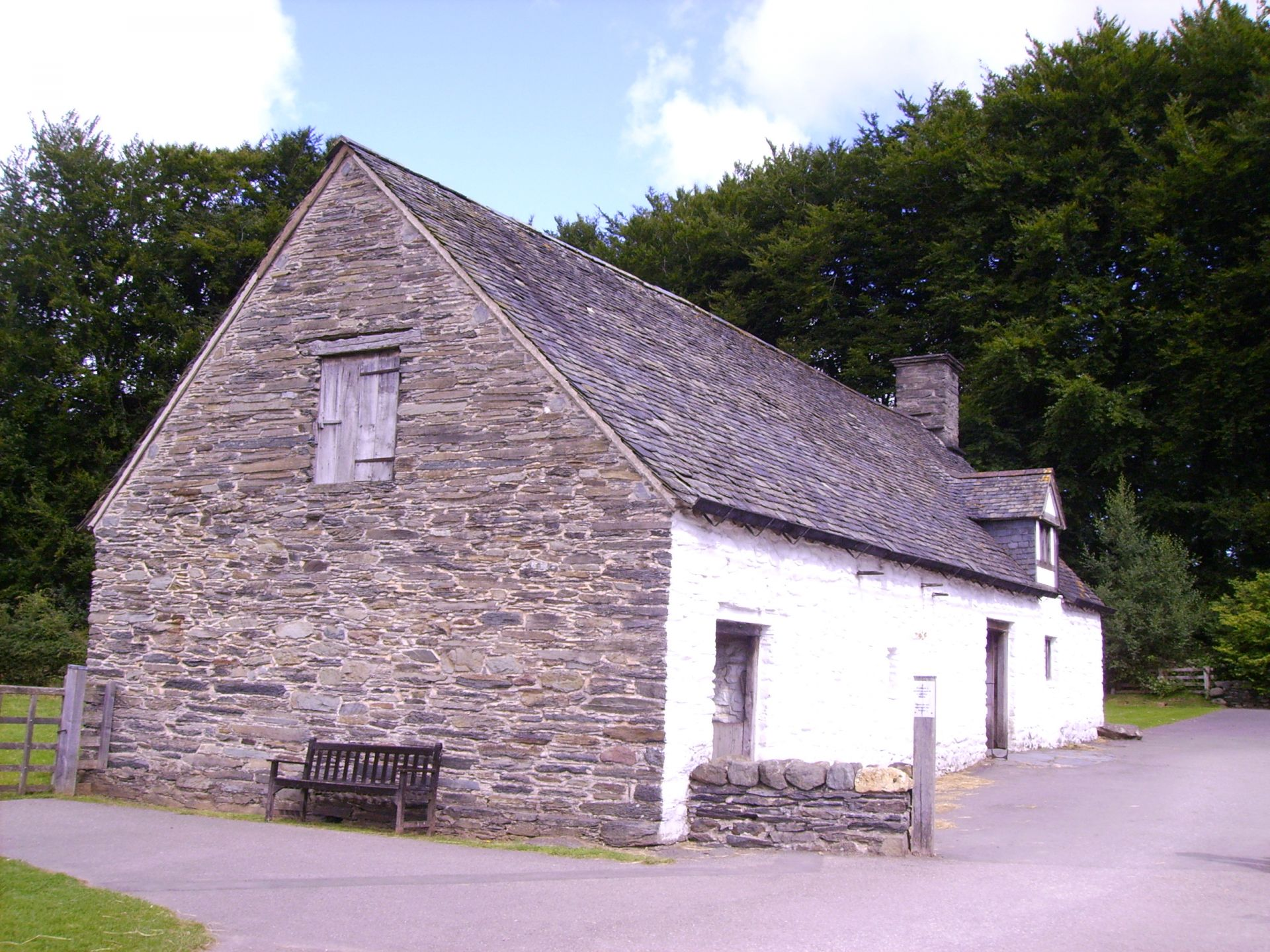
A 1735 Welsh longhouse in the 'Dartmoor' style; the gable end drain can just be made out below the modern bench

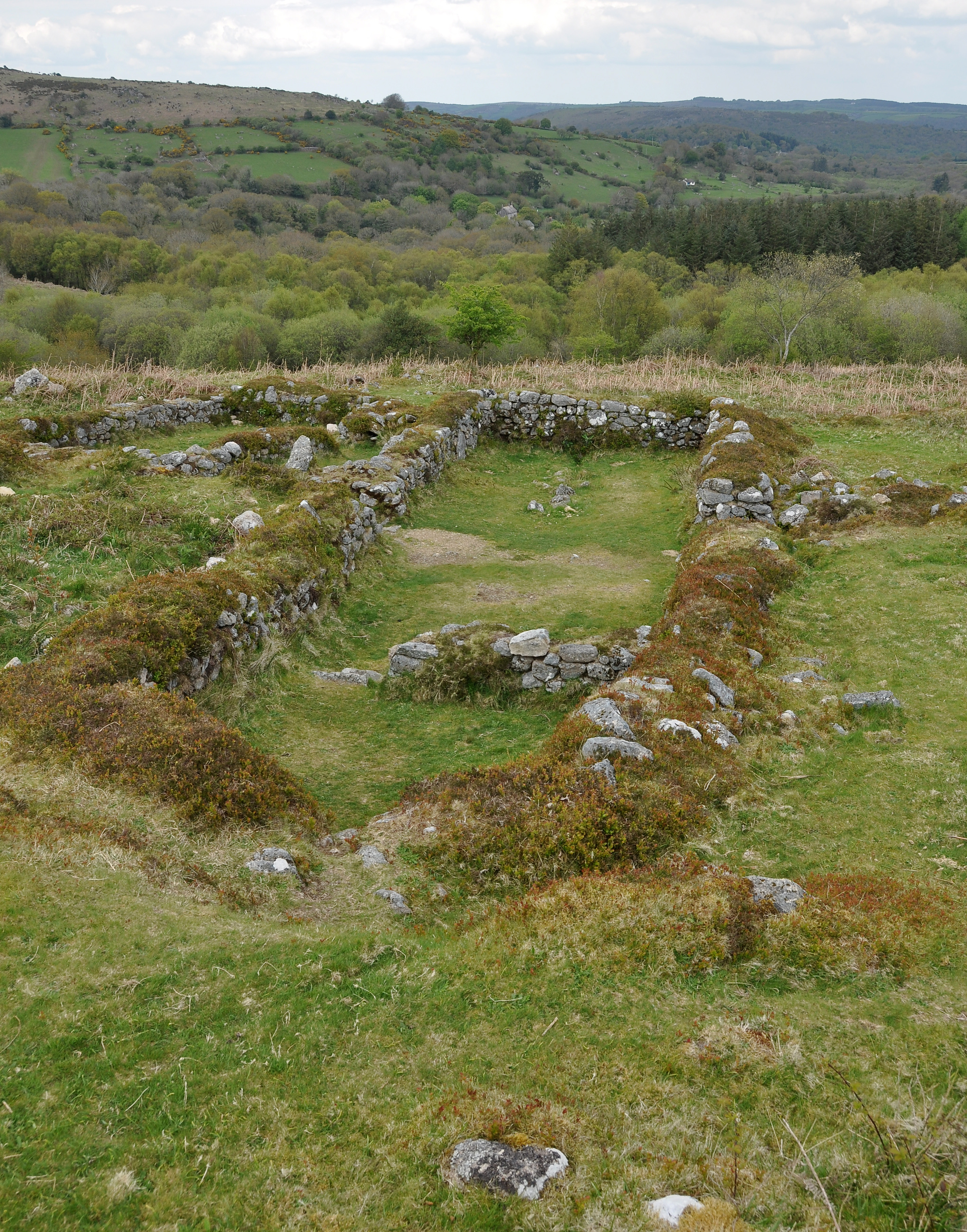
Hound Tor Longhouse 3 inhabited c.1250-1450

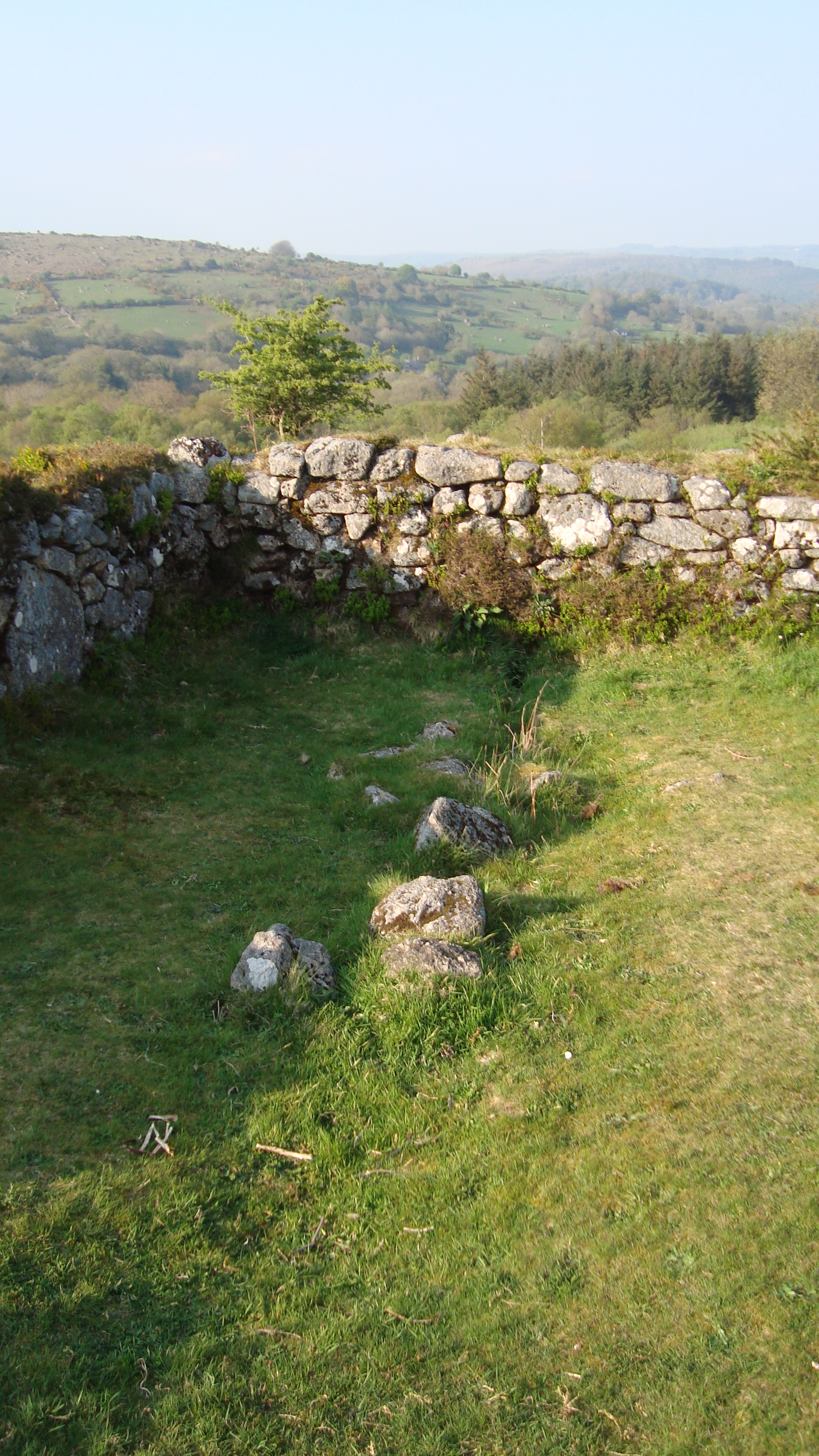
Hound Tor Longhouse shippen drain

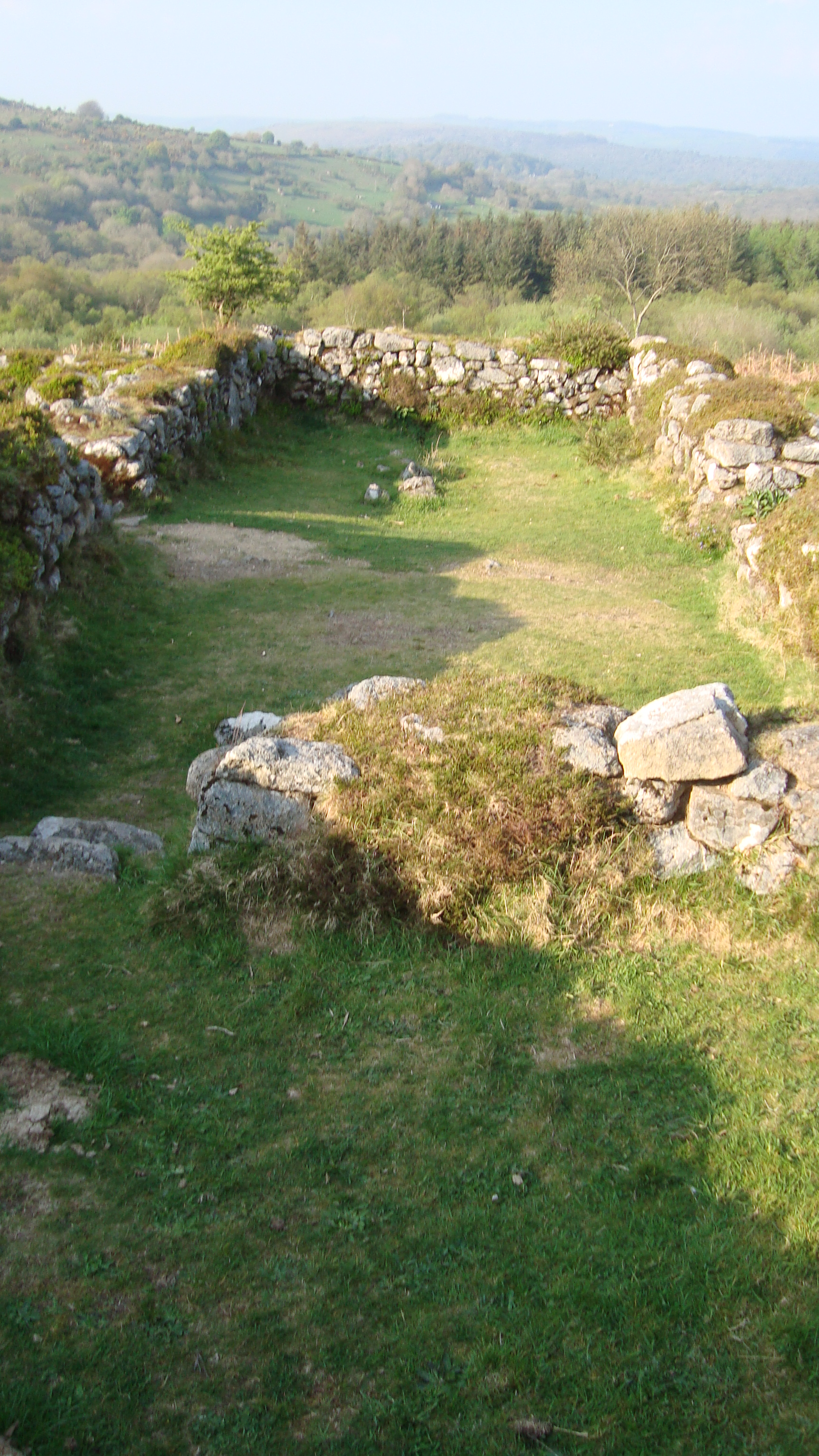
From raised platform toward shippen

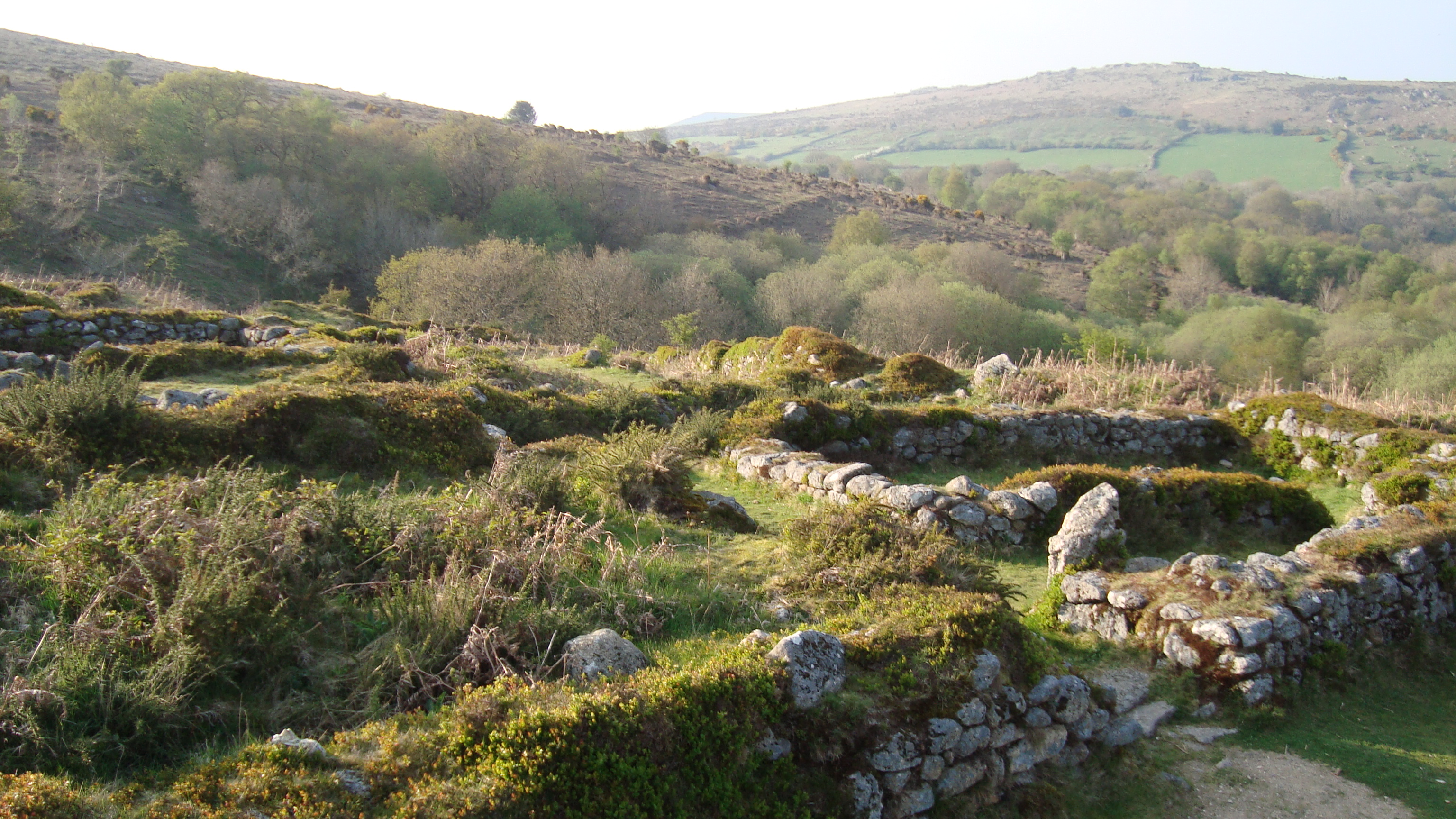
Hound Tor Longhouses

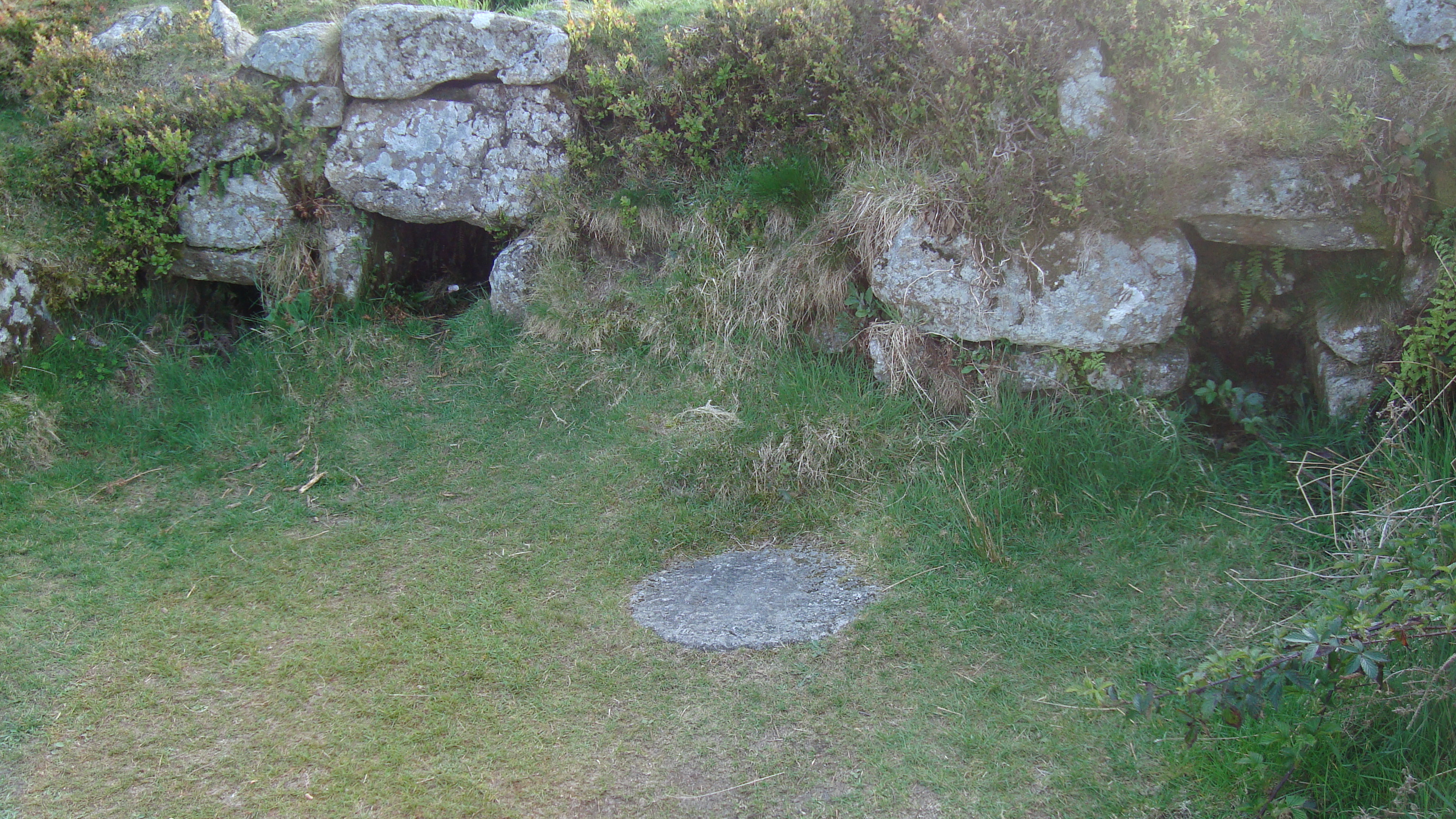
Hound Tor Longhouse open hearth stone and storage niches at inhabited end

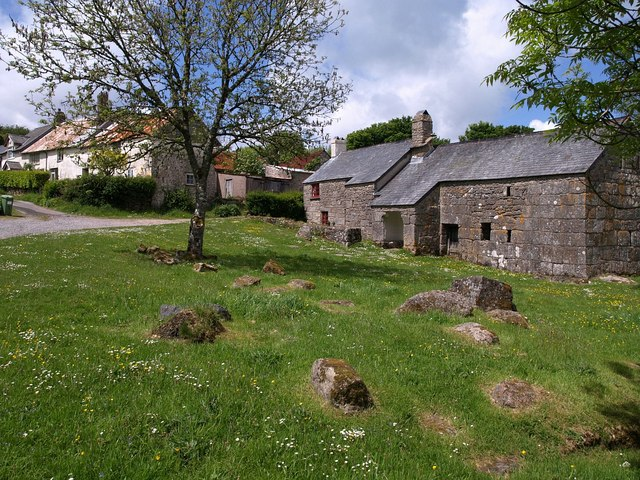
Sanders, Lettaford - with granite porch and chimney

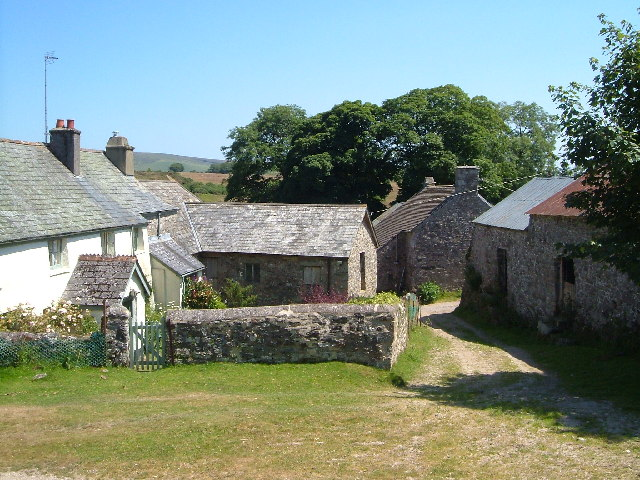
Pizwell hamlet of 4 well preserved longhouses

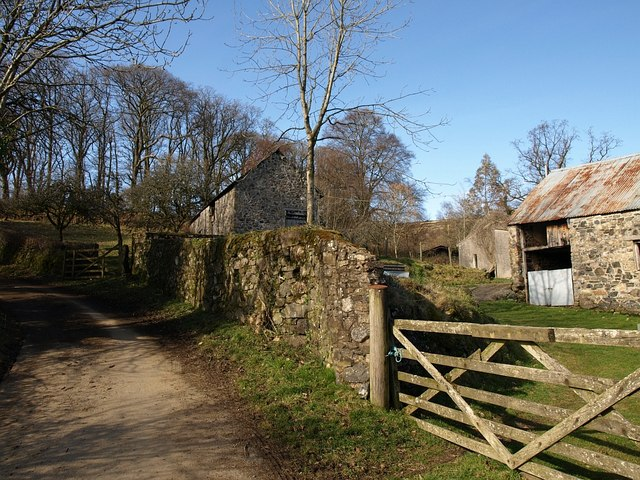
Michelcombe C16 barns

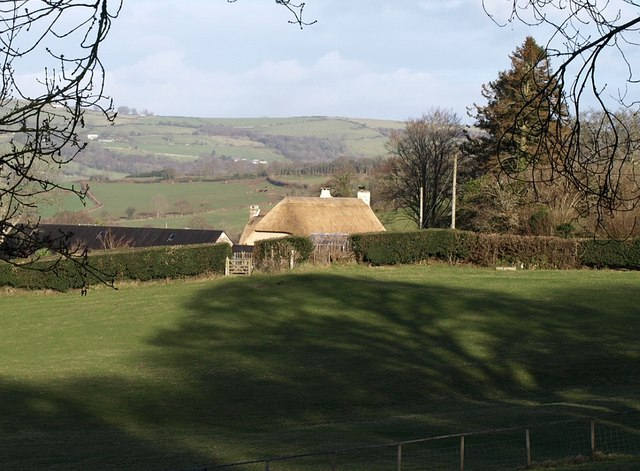
Westcott Farm, Uppacott, Widdecombe-in-the-moor

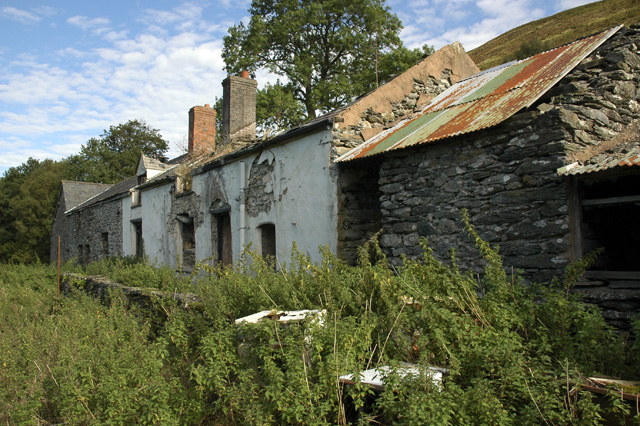
Tyddyn Tyfod a ruined Welsh Tyddyn

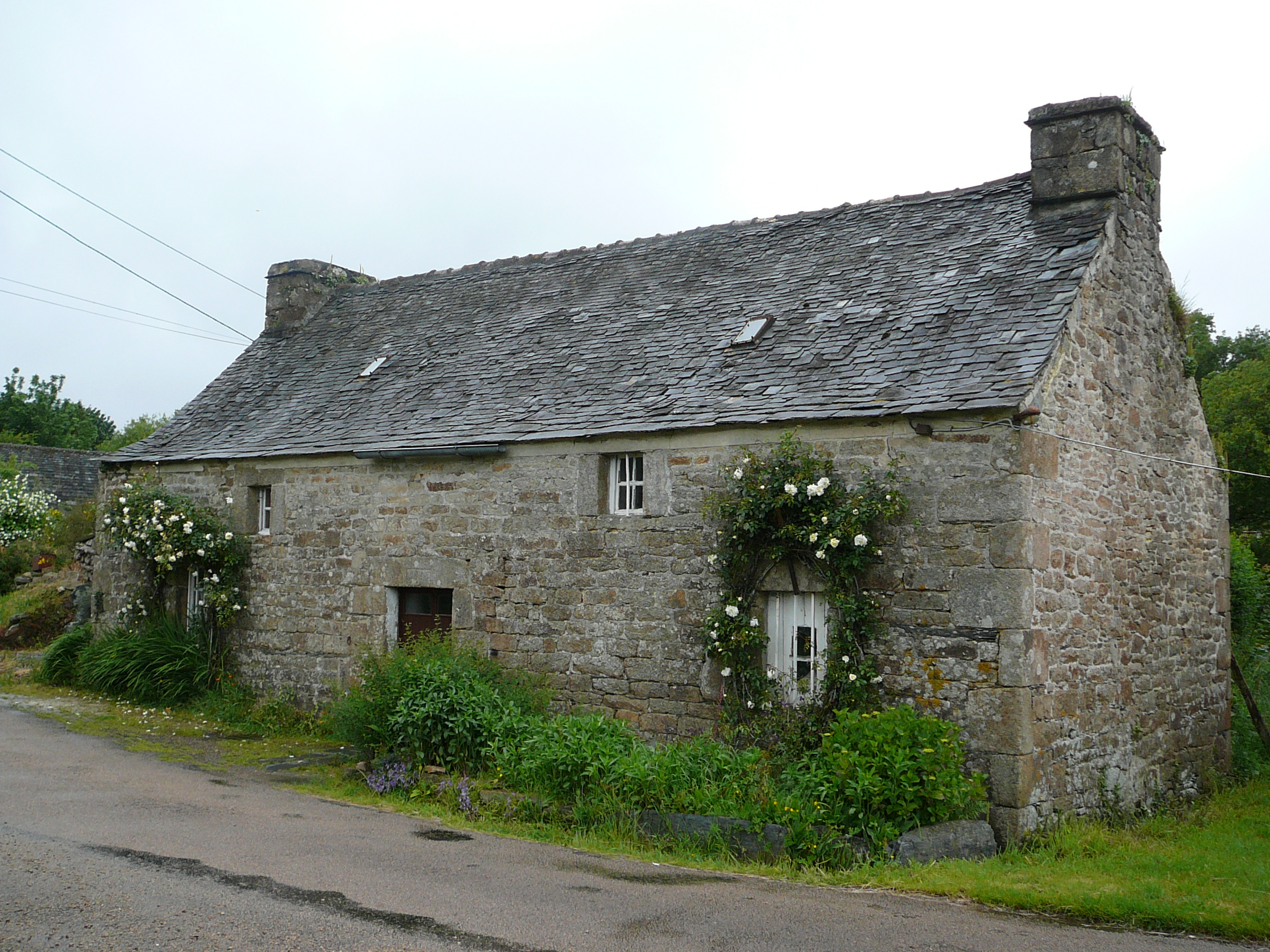
Breton Longere
