= Wistman's Wood =

English nature reserve on Dartmoor in Devon, England

- Site of Special Scientific Interest
- Oaks in Wistman's Wood

- Location within Devon
- Location of Wistman's Wood.
- Area of search: Devon
- Grid reference: SX612774
- Coordinates: 50.577°N 3.961°W
- Interest: Biological
- Area: 3.5 hectares (8.6 acres)
- Notification date: 1964
- Location map: English Nature

Wistman's Wood is one of Britain's most famous ancient temperate rainforests and one of only a few remote remaining high-altitude oakwoods on Dartmoor in Devon, England. The first written document to mention Wistman's Wood dates to the 17th century, while more recent tree-ring studies show that individual trees could be many hundreds of years old.

== Toponymy ==
Wistman is a local nickname for the Devil, derived from the dialect word wis(h)t, meaning "eerie" or "uncanny" (compare wish-hounds, the name given to a monstrous pack of hounds said to roam over Dartmoor at night). The Place-Names of Devon remarks that "the wood is in a lonely situation and its general appearance [is] strange and gloomy".

== Geography ==
View over the wood

The wood lies at an altitude of 380–410 metres (1,250–1,350 ft) in the valley of the West Dart River near Two Bridges, at grid reference SX612772.

The source of the Devonport Leat, at a weir on the West Dart River, is just north of the wood.

== Preservation status ==
The wood is one of the highest oakwoods in Britain, and one of Britain's last remaining temperate rainforests. As an outstanding example of native upland oak woodland, it was selected as a Site of Special Scientific Interest in 1964. It is also an NCR site and forms part of the Wistman's Wood National Nature Reserve. The wood was also one of the primary reasons for the selection of the Dartmoor Special Area of Conservation.

The other two high-altitude oakwoods of Dartmoor are Black-a-Tor Copse on the West Okement River in the north, and Piles Copse on the River Erme in the south.

In 2023, William, Prince of Wales as Duke of Cornwall announced a scheme in collaboration with Natural England to preserve, regenerate and double the size of the rainforest by 2040. Work began in October 2023. Acorns will be collected from the ancient trees to plant new saplings and both animal grazing and human foot traffic will be reduced in order to regenerate it sensitively.

Part of the land area designated as Wistman's Wood Site of Special Scientific Interest is owned by the Duchy of Cornwall.

== Description ==
The wood is split into three main blocks (North, Middle, and South Groves or Woods), which in total cover about 3.5 hectares (8.6 acres). These occupy the sheltered, south-west facing slope of the valley, where a bank of large granite boulders ("clatter") is exposed, and pockets of acidic, free-draining, brown earth soils have accumulated. Additional copses of scrub extend beyond the main body of the wood, suggesting that it originally extended over the entirety of the clatter deposits on the hillside. In the present day, the clatter outside of the main wood is covered in bracken, bilberry, and occasional gorse.

Wistman's Wood is owned by the Duchy of Cornwall and has been managed since 1961 under a nature reserve agreement with the Nature Conservancy Council, English Nature and Natural England. The wood has no active management, but many people visit the site on foot (mostly accessing the southern end of South Wood), and cattle and sheep have free access where the terrain permits, outside of a small fenced enclosure in South Wood.

=== Flora ===
The trees within the wood are mainly pedunculate oak, with occasional rowan, and a very few holly, hawthorn, hazel, and eared-willow. The oaks are distinguished by their dwarf habit, and rarely reach more than 4.5 metres (15 ft) in overall vertical height. The trees also developed highly contorted forms with procumbent trunks, and their main branches tend to lie on or between the rocks on the forest floor. A few trees reach from 6 to 7.6 metres (20 to 25 ft) in height; these also tend to have more vertical trunks and spread crowns.

Tree branches are characteristically festooned with a variety of epiphytic mosses and lichens and, sometimes, by grazing-sensitive species such as bilberry and polypody. The horizontal habit of the trunks and limbs allows organic debris and humus to accumulate on them, favoring the extensive growth of epiphytic vascular plants. These occur in much greater variety than in other British woodlands; in addition to polypody, which is the most common recorded epiphyte, and bilberry, these include many of the same species found on the forest floor.

On the ground, boulders are usually covered by lichens and mossy patches – frequent species include Dicranum scoparium, Hypotrachyna laevigata, Rhytidiadelphus loreus and Sphaerophorus globosus – and, where soil has accumulated, patches of acid grassland grow with heath bedstraw, tormentil and sorrel. In places protected from livestock, grazing-sensitive plants such as wood sorrel, bilberry, wood rush and bramble occur. A fringe of bracken surrounds much of the wood, demarcating the extent of brown earth soils. The wood supports approximately 120 species of lichen.

=== Fauna ===
The wood is home to a large population of adders.

== History ==
Wistman's Wood has been mentioned in writing for hundreds of years. It is likely to be a leftover from the ancient forest that covered much of Dartmoor c. 7000 BCE, before Mesolithic hunter/gatherers cleared it around 5000 BCE. Photographic and other records show that Wistman's Wood has changed considerably since the mid-19th century; at the same time climatic conditions have also generally become warmer. Over this period, the older oak trees have grown from a stunted/semi-prostrate to a more ascending form, while a new generation of mostly straight-grown and single-stemmed oaks has developed. The oldest oaks appear to be 400–500 years old, and originated within a degenerating oakwood that survived in scrub form during two centuries of cold climate. In c. 1620, these old trees were described as "no taller than a man may touch to top with his head". Tree height increased somewhat by the mid-19th century, and during the 20th century approximately doubled (in 1997 the maximum and average height of trees were around 12 m (39 ft) and 7 m (23 ft) respectively). In addition, a wave of marginal new oaks arose after c. 1900, roughly doubling the area of wood. Part of the evidence for these changes comes from a permanent vegetation plot located at the southern end of South Wood. This is the oldest known of its kind in British woodland, with a small part having been recorded by R. Hansford Worth in 1921.

The Buller Stone, a boulder to the east of the wood, commemorates an attempt in 1866 to date the trees, when Wentworth Buller (with permission from the Duchy) felled an oak, which was estimated to be close to 168 years old.

== Myths, art and literature ==
The wood has been the inspiration for numerous artists, poets, and photographers. It appears in hundreds of 19th-century accounts. One tradition holds that it was planted by Isabella de Fortibus (1237–93).

The legendary Wild Hunt in Devon, whose hellhounds are known as Yeth (Heath) or Wisht Hounds in the Devonshire dialect, is particularly associated with Wistman's Wood. Wistman's Wood and the legend of the Wild Hunt served as the inspiration for the setting of Sir Arthur Conan Doyle's Sherlock Holmes novel The Hound of the Baskervilles following Doyle's visit to the wood.

The wood is described in detail and discussed as a point of great interest in The Tree (1978), an essay on naturalism by English novelist John Fowles.

== Bibliography ==
- Worth, R. H. (1967). Spooner, G. M.; Russell, F. S. (eds.). Worth's Dartmoor. Newton Abbot: David & Charles. pp. 74–83. ISBN 0715351486.
- Westwood, Jennifer (1986). Albion: A Guide to Legendary Britain. Salem, Massachusetts: Salem House Publishers. ISBN 978-0881621280.
