= Blackbrook River =

Tributary of the West Dart River in Devon, England

Coordinates: 50°33′02″N 3°57′10″W

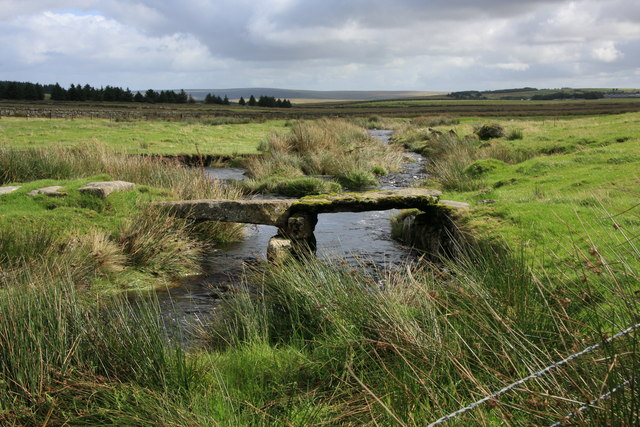
A clapper bridge over the Blackbrook River

The Blackbrook River, also known as the Blackabrook River, is a tributary of the West Dart River on Dartmoor in Devon, England.

== Course ==
The river's source at Blackbrook Head in the Merrivale Range Danger Area just north of Black Dunghill, from which it flows south. As it crosses the moor, it soon leaves the Merrivale Range and is crossed by the B3357 road. It then flows to the east of Princetown before being crossed by the B3212 road. The river then heads east onto the moor again, where it meets the West Dart River from the right.
