= The American Prisoner (film) =

1929 British film by Thomas Bentley

- Directed by: Thomas Bentley
- Written by: Eliot Stannard; Garnett Weston
- Based on: The American Prisoner by Eden Phillpotts
- Produced by: Walter C. Mycroft
- Starring: Carl Brisson; Madeleine Carroll; Cecil Barry; Carl Harbord
- Cinematography: René Guissart
- Edited by: Sam Simmonds
- Music by: John Reynders; Jules Sylvain
- Production company: British International Pictures
- Distributed by: Wardour Films
- Release date: 18 September 1929
- Running time: 76 minutes
- Country: United Kingdom
- Languages: Sound (All-Talking); English

The American Prisoner is an all-talking sound 1929 British drama film directed by Thomas Bentley and starring Carl Brisson, Madeleine Carroll and Cecil Barry. It was adapted from the 1904 novel The American Prisoner by Eden Phillpotts. It was originally conceived as a silent film, but was converted into an All-Talkie in line with widespread practice at British International Pictures during 1928–1929.

== Plot ==
An American sailor imprisoned on Dartmoor during the American War of Independence manages to escape and fall in love with a local Squire's daughter.

== Cast ==
- Carl Brisson as Lt. Stark
- Madeleine Carroll as Grace Malherb
- Cecil Barry as Peter Norcutt
- Carl Harbord as Lt. Burnham
- A. Bromley Davenport as Squire Malherb
- Nancy Price as Lovey Lee
- Reginald Fox as Captain Mainwaring
- Charles Ashton as Carberry
- Harry Terry as Bosun Knapps
- John Valentine as Commander Miller
- Robert English as Col. Governor
- Edward Dignon as Leverett
- Lucius Blake

== Music ==
The film featured a theme song entitled "I Wonder If You Will Remember" with lyrics by Harry Carlton and music by Jules Sylvain. The song was sung by Carl Brisson in the film. The song was recorded by the tenor Eddie King and released on the Parlophone label (Catalog Number R 503).

== See also ==
- List of films about the American Revolution
- List of early sound feature films (1926–1929)

== Bibliography ==
- Low, Rachael. The History of the British Film 1929-1939: Film Making in 1930s Britain. George Allen & Unwin, 1985.
