= West Dart River =

Tributary of the River Dart in Devon, England

West Dart
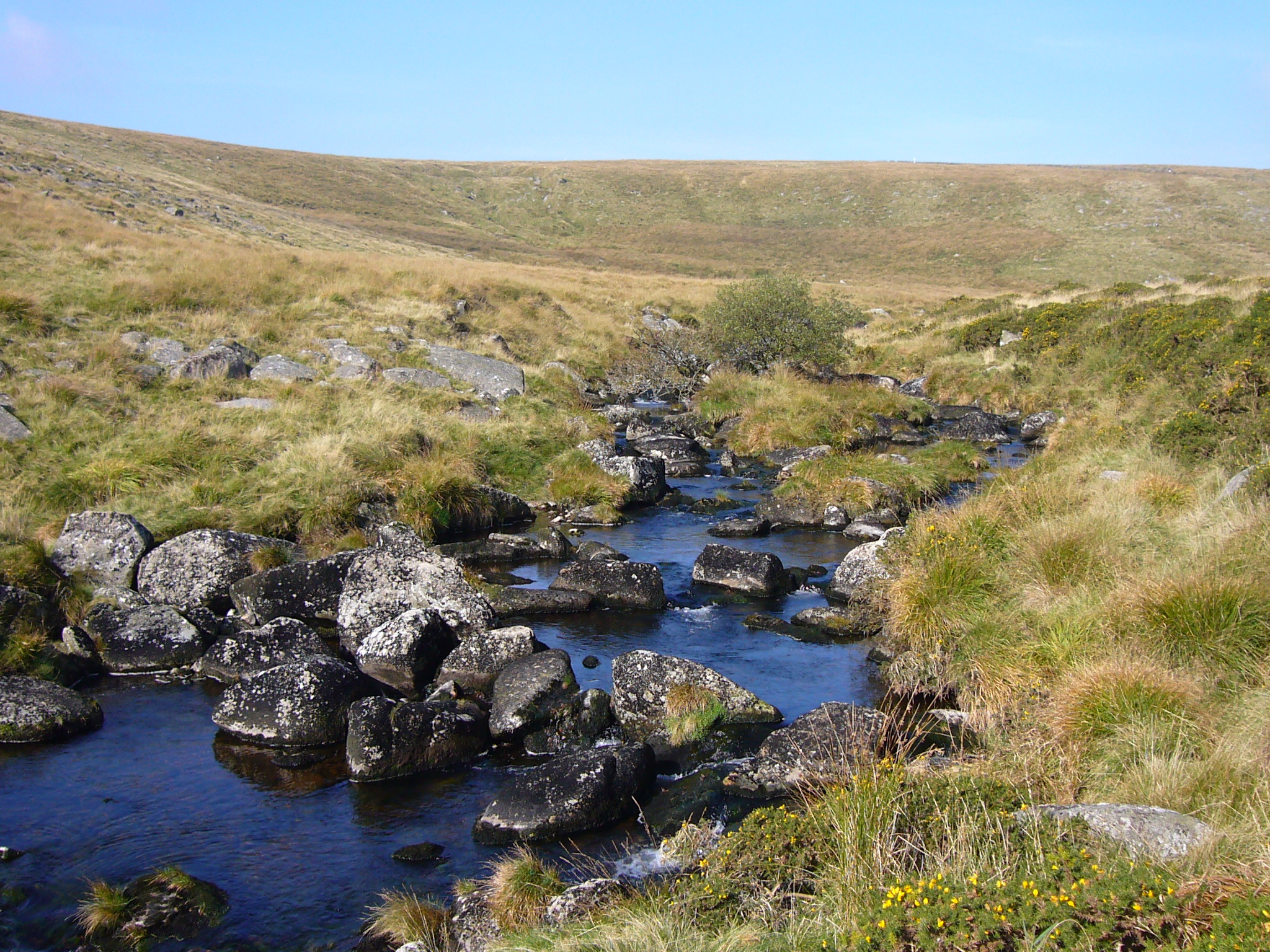
- Upper reaches of the West Dart.

Location
- Country: England
- County: Devon

Physical characteristics
- Source
  - location: 50.618°N 3.978°W
  - elevation: 540 m (1,770 ft)
- Mouth: Dartmeet; 50.545°N 3.877°W
  - elevation: 210 m (690 ft)
- Length: 16.25 km (10.10 mi)

The West Dart River is one of the two main tributaries of the River Dart in Devon, England.

Its source is about 2 km north of Rough Tor on north Dartmoor. It flows south to Two Bridges, then south east past Hexworthy to meet the East Dart River at Dartmeet.

On the left bank of the river about a mile above Two Bridges is the broadleaved Wistman's Wood, "fascinating high-level woods that are quite unlike anywhere else".

Tributaries include the Cowsic River which rises near Devils Tor and flows south below Lydford Tor, to join the West Dart at Two Bridges. Other right bank tributaries include the Blackbrook River, River Swincombe and the O Brook. The Cherry Brook joins the West Dart on the left bank near Sherberton.
