= Two Bridges, Devon =

Hamlet in Devon, United Kingdom

Coordinates: 50°33′29″N 3°57′56″W

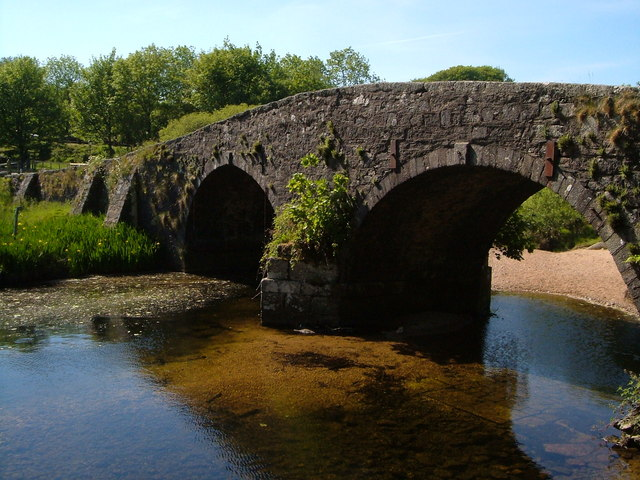
The old bridge

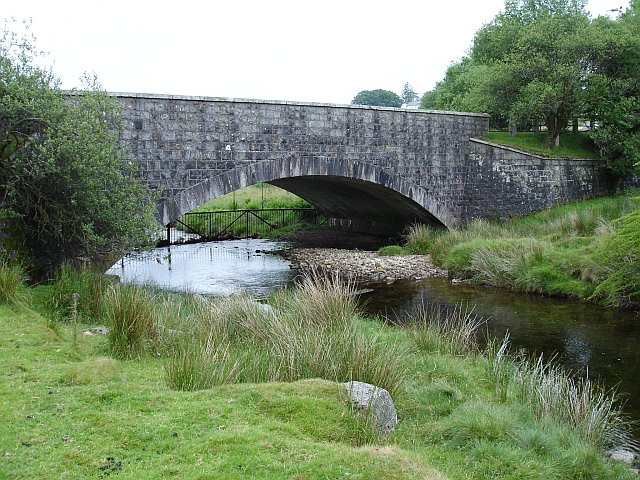
The new bridge

Two Bridges is an isolated location on the river West Dart in the heart of Dartmoor National Park in Devon, England. It is situated around 2.5 km (1.6 mi) northeast of Princetown at the intersection of the two roads that cross Dartmoor: one is the old turnpike road which was built across Dartmoor in the late 18th century (now known as the B3212); the other is the B3357.

A map dated 1765 suggests the origin of the name, for in those days the road crossed both the West Dart and the River Cowsic, just upstream from the point where they meet, and required two separate bridges.

By 1891, these had disappeared and there was just a single bridge, further downstream, over the West Dart. Today, however, there are again two bridges on the site, because a more modern structure has been added alongside its earlier predecessor. Visitors often mistakenly assume that these are the same two bridges that gave the name to the site.

In the 18th century, Two Bridges was best known for its potato market. Some small quarries in the vicinity show that there was also light industry in the area.

Those who met and worked in this remote spot were fed and lodged at the Saracen's Head. It was built in 1794 as a coaching inn, and still stands there today, although it is now known as the Two Bridges Hotel.

It continues to be a popular meeting point for tourists and walkers. The area is also surrounded by prehistoric antiquities, including Bronze Age settlements, stone rows and an impressive standing stone, the Beardown Man, situated to the north. The Devonport Leat—a man-made waterchannel—passes nearby. Wistman's Wood, a high-altitude oak wood, is 2 kilometres (1.2 mi) to the north.

== See also ==
- The Legend of the Hairy hands (local ghost story)
