= Huckerby =

Huckerby is a surname. Notable people with the surname include:

- Darren Huckerby (born 1976), English football coach and former footballer
- James Huckerby (1826–1900), English builder and architect
