= Lydford =

Village in Devon, England

Coordinates: 50.646°N 4.106°W

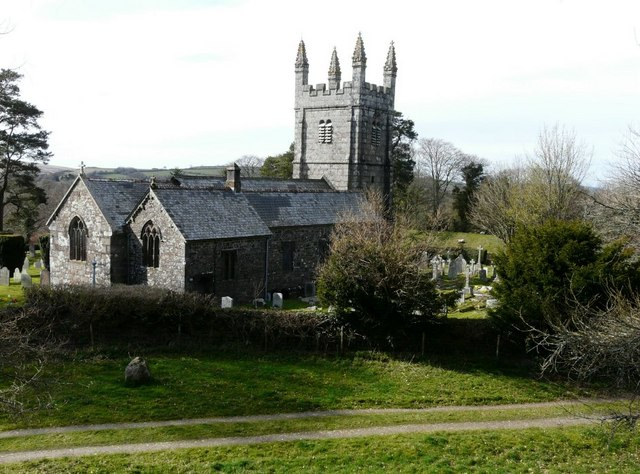
- St Petrock's Church, Lydford

- Location within Devon
- Population: 370 (2021)
- OS grid reference: SX512850
- Civil parish: Lydford
- District: West Devon
- Shire county: Devon
- Region: South West
- Country: England
- Sovereign state: United Kingdom
- Post town: Okehampton
- Postcode district: EX20
- Police: Devon and Cornwall
- Fire: Devon and Somerset
- Ambulance: South Western
- UK Parliament: Torridge and West Devon

Lydford, sometimes spelled Lidford, is a village and civil parish, in the West Devon district, in Devon, England, seven miles (11 km) north of Tavistock on the western fringe of Dartmoor. The parish covers an area of 50,000 acres (200 km^{2}), and at the 2021 census had a population of 370.

The village is on the small River Lyd, which traverses a deep narrow chasm, crossed by a bridge of single span. Running south-west from the village is Lydford Gorge, a 1 1/2 miles (2.4 km) wooded gorge which has been cut through the slate rock by the river, and is noted for its 30-metre (98 ft) waterfall. The gorge area is owned by the National Trust.

Once an important town, Lydford is noted for its history and surrounding countryside, and has been described as a tourism honeypot.

== Etymology ==
The original Anglo-Saxon names for the village were Hlidaford or Hlidan, from hlid, meaning a cover or lid, referring to the almost perfect concealment of the river beneath the chasm at the bridge, and ford (crossing). Over the years the name mutated via Lyghatford, Lidefort and Lideford to the contemporary spelling.

== History ==
Historically Lydford was an economic powerhouse, established as one of the four Saxon burhs of Devon by king Alfred the Great. It first appears in recorded history in 997, when the Danes made a plundering expedition up the Tamar and Tavy as far as Hlidaforda (i.e. Lydford). The attack is described in the Anglo-Saxon Chronicle:

Her on ðissum geare ferde se here abutan Defenanscire into Sæfern muðan and þær heregodan ægðer ge on Cornwealum and on Norðwealum and on Defenum, and eodon him þa up æt Wecedport and þær micel yfel worhton on bærnette and on mannslihtum, and æfter þam wendon eft abutan Penwiðsteort on þa suðhealfe and wendon þa into Tamer muðan and eodon þa up oð hi comon to Hlydanforda, and ælc þing bærndon and slogon þe hi gemitton, and Ordulfes mynster Tæfingstoc forbærndon and unasecgendlice herehyðe mid him to scypon brohton.

Translation:

In this year, they (the Vikings) visited Devonshire and at the mouth of the Severn, pillaging in Cornwall, Devon and Wales. They went to Watchet, and there caused much damage by dint of arson and wholesale slaughter. Then they turned at Penwith Tail to the south and up into the mouth of the Tamar, travelling to Lydford, burning and slaughtering anything they came across, and burned down Ordwulf's monastery at Tavistock, carrying vast amounts of loot back to their ships.

During the reign of Ethelred the Unready Lydford had a mint; coins minted there were inscribed LVD., LVDA, and LVDAN. In the reign of Edward the Confessor it was the most populous centre in Devon after Exeter, but Domesday Book relates that forty houses had lain waste since the Norman Conquest. The town never recovered its former prosperity under the Normans and, according to Domesday Book, Lydford was taxed equally with London. Under the Normans, and until the 20th century, the parish of Lydford included all of the Forest of Dartmoor.

Until the 12th century, parishioners from across most of Dartmoor were brought to Lydford for burial. The path used to make this final journey is known as the 'Lych way'. Many reports have been made of monks in white and phantom funeral processions seen walking along this path.

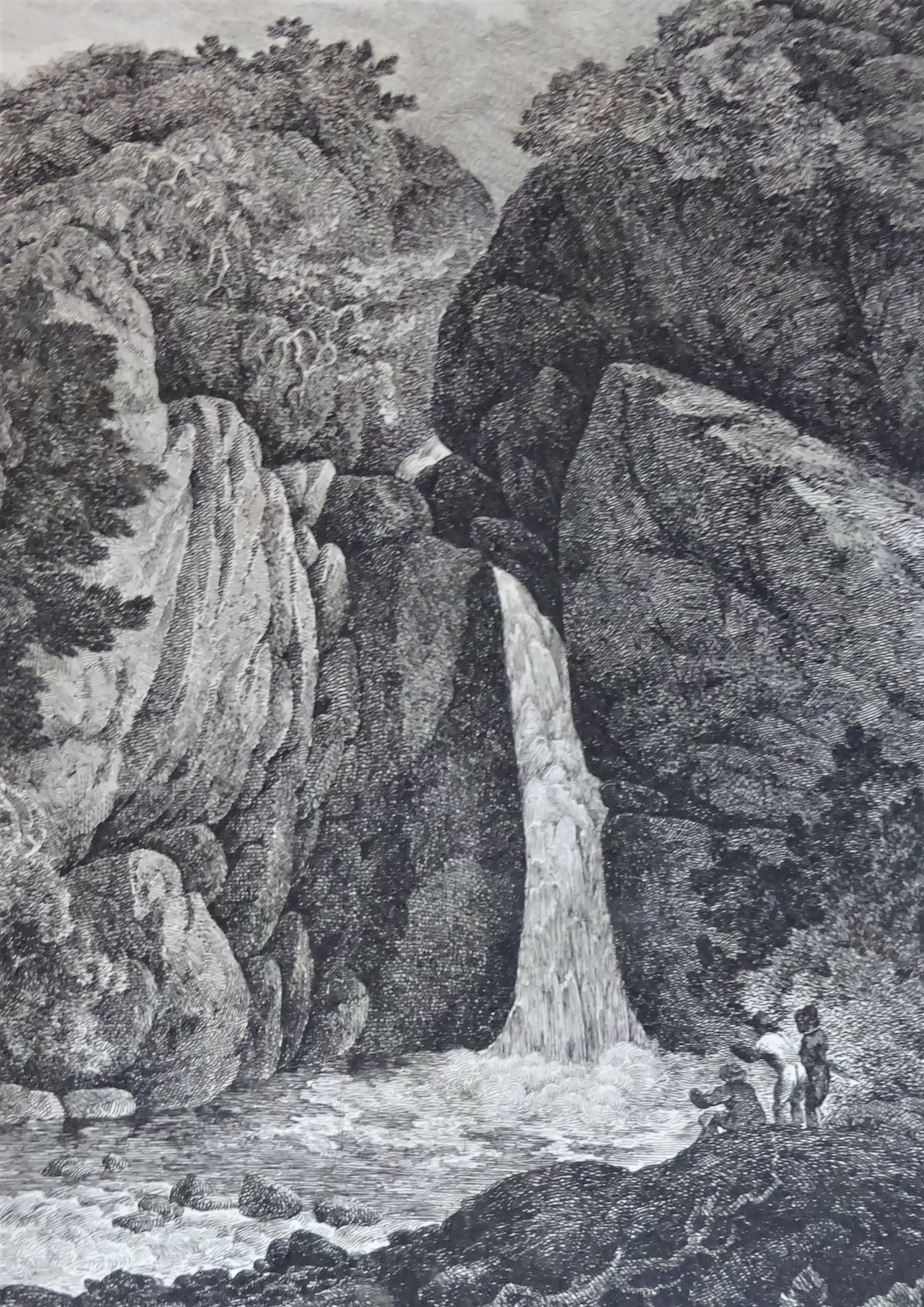
Kate's Fall in 1805.

Lydford Castle is first mentioned in 1216, when it was granted to William Briwere, and was shortly afterwards fixed as the prison of the stannaries and the meeting-place of the Forest Courts of Dartmoor. A gild at Lideford is mentioned in 1180, and the pipe roll of 1195 records a grant for the reestablishment of the market. In 1238 the borough, which had hitherto been crown demesne, was bestowed by Henry III on Richard of Cornwall, who in 1268 obtained a grant of a Wednesday market and a three days fair at the feast of St Petrock. The borough had a separate coroner and bailiff in 1275, but it was never incorporated by charter, and only once, in 1300, returned members to parliament.

During the English Civil War, Lydford was the haunt of the then notorious Gubbins band, a gang of ruthless cut-throats and highwaymen, who took advantage of the turmoil of the times to ply their villainry. According to one account of the time:

Gubbins-land is a Scythia within England, and they pure heathens therein. Their language is the drosse of the dregs of the vulgar Devonian, They hold together like burrs: offend one and all will avenge their quarrel.

In 1987 the parish of Lydford finally lost its claim to be the largest parish in England. It was split into two civil parishes, Lydford and Dartmoor Forest. The ecclesiastical parish has also been split, with Princetown made a separate parish.

== Lydford Church ==
The dedication of the parish church to St. Petrock would seem to indicate that it was built on the site of a pre-existing British settlement.

The current church was built in the perpendicular gothic style, and although ostensibly Norman, some of the architectural furniture, for example the font, is of the Anglo-Saxon style (or at latest, early Norman), thus it would appear that the church was rebuilt upon the site of the earlier building.

The church was enlarged in the 13th century and the tower added in the 15th century. In 1890 the vestry and northern aisle were added.

== Lydford Castle ==
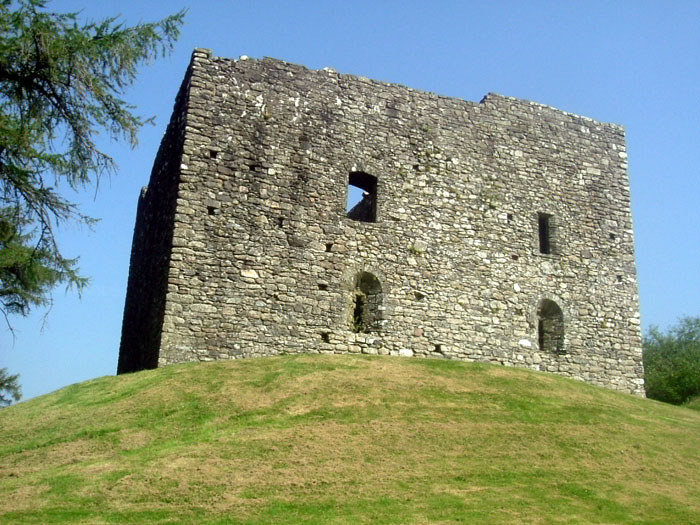
Lydford Castle

Two castles have been built at Lydford, the first immediately in the wake of the Norman Conquest in 1066.

The second castle was built on the site of the first castle in 1132. It was a 3-storey tower, commanding a strategic view over much of the surrounding countryside, and was eminently defensible, with the Gorge on one side, and the land sloping steeply away from it.

Its use changed under Edward I, who made the castle the Stannary prison; its reputation was not good. Sir Richard Grenville used the prison as an oubliette for his political opponents. An order of Parliament during the reign of Henry VIII describes the prison in 1512 as "one of the most hanious, contagious and detestable places in the realm"; Lydford Law was a by-word for injustice. It was also one of the seats of the Bloody Assizes of Hanging Judge Jeffreys.

The prison is commemorated in the poem "Lydford Law" by the Tavistock poet William Browne:

I've often hear of Lydford law,
How in the morn they hang and draw,
And sit in judgement after

At the time of Cromwell's Commonwealth, the castle was entirely in ruins, but in the 18th century it was restored and again used as a prison and as the meeting-place of the manor and borough courts. The site is now maintained by English Heritage, and entry is free of charge.

== Lydford's toll road ==
Lydford is located on the former stagecoach route between Tavistock and Okehampton. Now the A386, this was the Okehampton Turnpike Trust's Tavistock Road. Near Beardon is a 'Take-off' stone set in the verge. On steep hills heavily laden waggons or coaches could add an extra toll-free horse to help pull the vehicle up the hill, but this horse had to be taken off at the top. Very few of these stones still exist in situ.

== Twin towns ==
Lydford is twinned with Petiville, France.

== Sources and external links ==
- Lydford Parish Council and village website
- Lydford village website
- Lydford travel guide from Wikivoyage
