= Hexworthy =

Hamlet in Devon, England

Coordinates: 50.538°N 3.899°W

- Location within Devon
- OS grid reference: SX655726
- Civil parish: Dartmoor Forest
- Shire county: Devon
- Region: South West
- Country: England
- Sovereign state: United Kingdom
- Police: Devon and Cornwall
- Fire: Devon and Somerset
- Ambulance: South Western

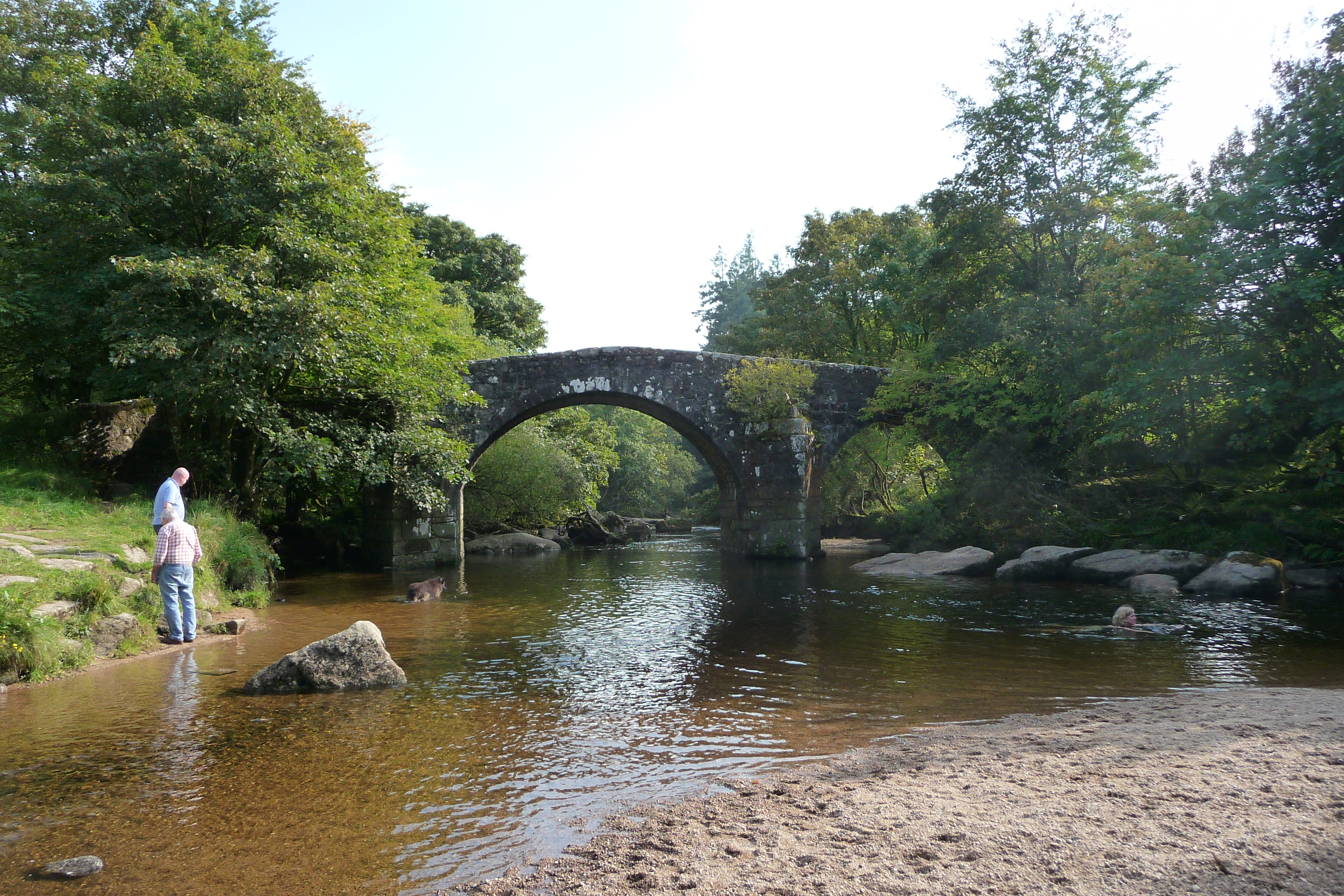
The bridge across the West Dart at Hexworthy.

Hexworthy /ˈhæksəri/ is a hamlet on Dartmoor, in Devon, England. It lies on the West Dart River a mile upstream from Dartmeet. Historically in the parish of Lydford, since 1987 it has been in the civil parish of Dartmoor Forest.

Hexworthy has an inn, the Forest Inn, opened in the 1850s.

Very close to the village, on the opposite bank of the West Dart, is the hamlet of Huccaby, which has a parish church which is unusual for being dedicated to St Raphael.

There was a long history of tin mining near Hexworthy. Tin works in the valley of the O Brook were first recorded in 1240, and the Henroost or Hexworthy Mine did not close until 1919.
