= Babeny =

Village in Devon, England

Coordinates: 50.5612°N 3.8765°W

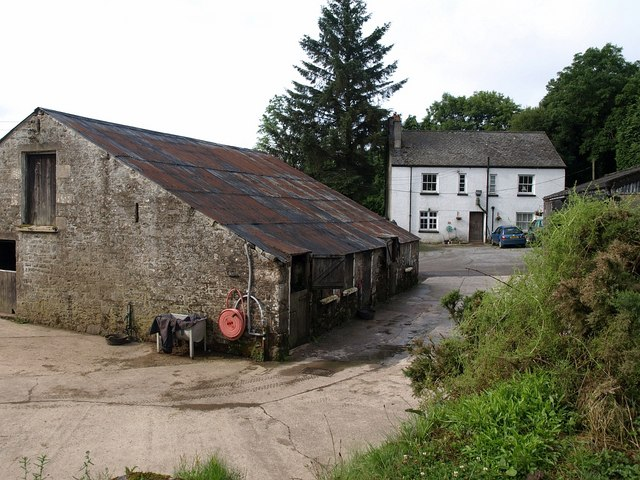
- Babeny Farm

- Location within Devon
- OS grid reference: SX6775
- Shire county: Devon
- Region: South West
- Country: England
- Sovereign state: United Kingdom
- Police: Devon and Cornwall
- Fire: Devon and Somerset
- Ambulance: South Western

Babeny is a village in Devon, England.
