= Dartmoor Preservation Association =

English conservation charity

Friends of Dartmoor: DPA - Dartmoor Preservation Association
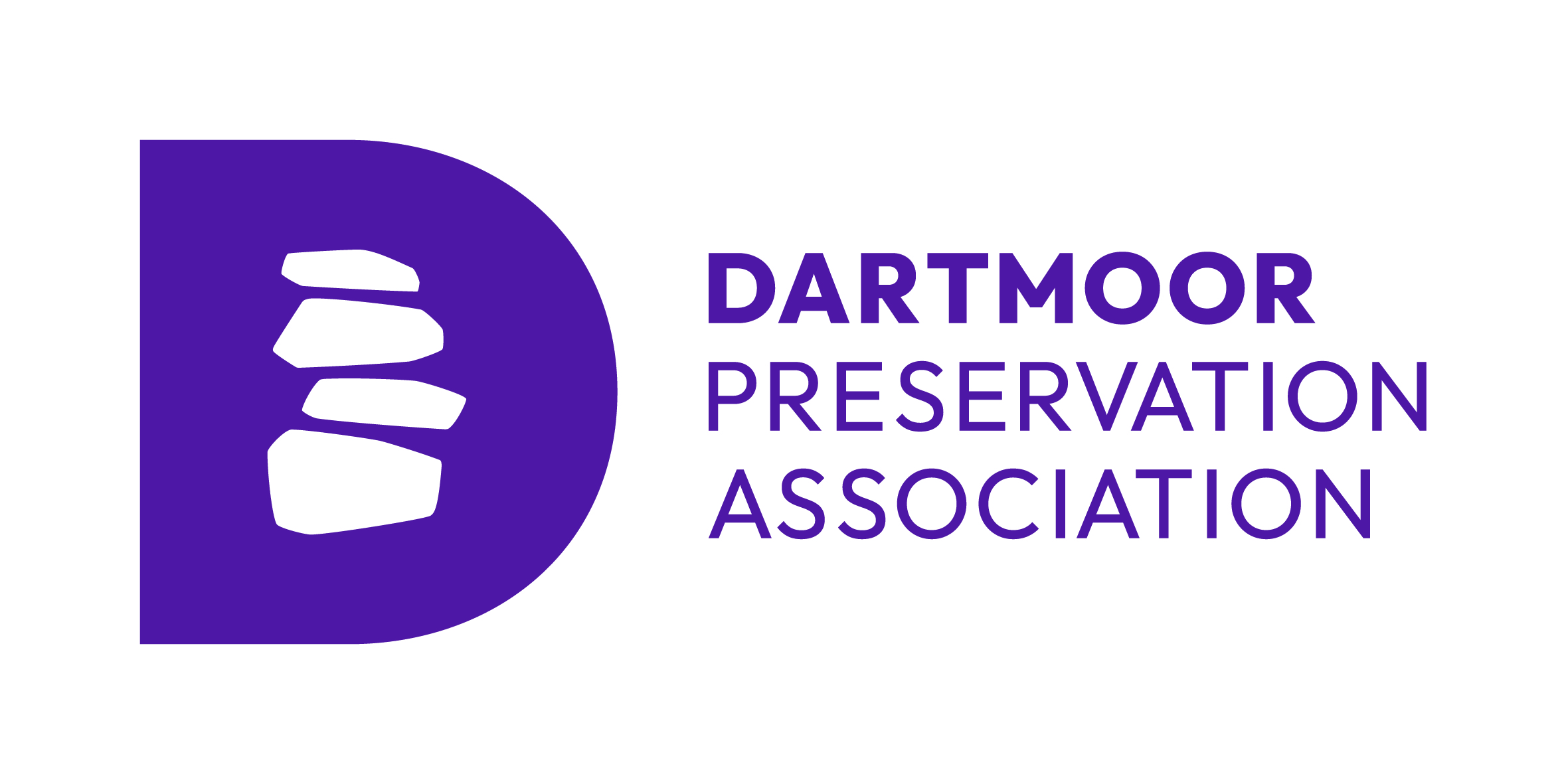
- DPA logo 2023
- Type: Conservation charity
- Founded: 1883
- Headquarters: Old Duchy Hotel, Princetown, Yelverton, Devon, PL20 6QF
- Area served: Dartmoor National Park
- Revenue: 19,688 pound sterling (2021)
- Website: dartmoorpreservation.co.uk

Dartmoor Preservation Association (DPA) is one of the oldest environmental or amenity bodies in the UK. It was founded in 1883. It concerns itself with Dartmoor, a National Park in Devon, south-west England. It began with two main areas of concern. Firstly, commoners' rights were being eroded through army use, including the firing of live artillery shells, and piecemeal enclosure of land around the margins. Secondly, there was increasing public interest in Dartmoor's scenery, archaeology, history and wildlife

The DPA has opposed what it considered to be unsuitable developments on Dartmoor throughout its history. In its founding year, the secretary, Robert Burnard persuaded the War Department not to fire on the Okehampton Firing Range on Saturdays to allow access to the public. Many battles have been fought since, particularly against the military presence and the proposed building of reservoirs on the moor, notably under the Chairmanship of Lady Sayer, granddaughter of Robert Burnard.

The DPA continues to follow the same objectives as when it was founded. For example, in June 2015, it supported the inhabitants of Widecombe-in-the-Moor against the erecting of a telecommunications mast in an area of pristine countryside against the wishes of the local population.

Dartmoor Preservation Association is a registered charity, Number 215665.

== Background ==
Dartmoor is said to be one of the last remaining areas of wilderness in Britain, but it has been a managed landscape since the late Neolithic (3,000-2,500 BCE). The Bronze Age inhabitants (from 2,500 to 750 BCE) cleared ancient forest and developed farming. They made extensive use of surface moorstone in the construction of roundhouses (their remains now seen as "hut circles"), enclosures, land-dividing reaves, stone rows, stone circles, menhirs and kistvaens.

Farming has continued through the medieval period to the present day, but a more disruptive activity to the landscape was the appearance of tin-mining, firstly by stream-working, then by lode-working and finally by underground mining. Many valleys have been dug over and scarred, leaving a rich industrial archaeology. Other activities such as newtake wall building, peat cutting, rabbit warrening, quarrying, clay extraction and the building of a prominent prison have all left marks on the moor. Recent undertakings have left more obvious changes: the building of reservoirs and the planting of conifer forests.

== History of the association ==
The use of moorstone continued up to recent times with the extensive building of dry stone walls around farm newtakes. Later, stone was cut and dressed. The use of moorstone continued to such an extent that in 1847 boundary markers were cut around Pew Tor to protect it. Marker stones were erected around Roos Tor. The taking of stone started to change the Dartmoor landscape: for example Eric Hemery (writing in 1983) stated that Swell Tor had been "decapitated and disembowelled by the quarrymen".

In August 1881, a public meeting was convened by the Portreeve of Tavistock in the Guildhall to discuss the continued taking of stone, particularly from landmark tors. The DPA was founded in 1883. The protected area around Pew Tor was extended in December 1896. In 1901, the DPA commissioned a report into damage to ancient monuments, caused by the taking of stone for building and road-mending, and into unlawful enclosures of common land.

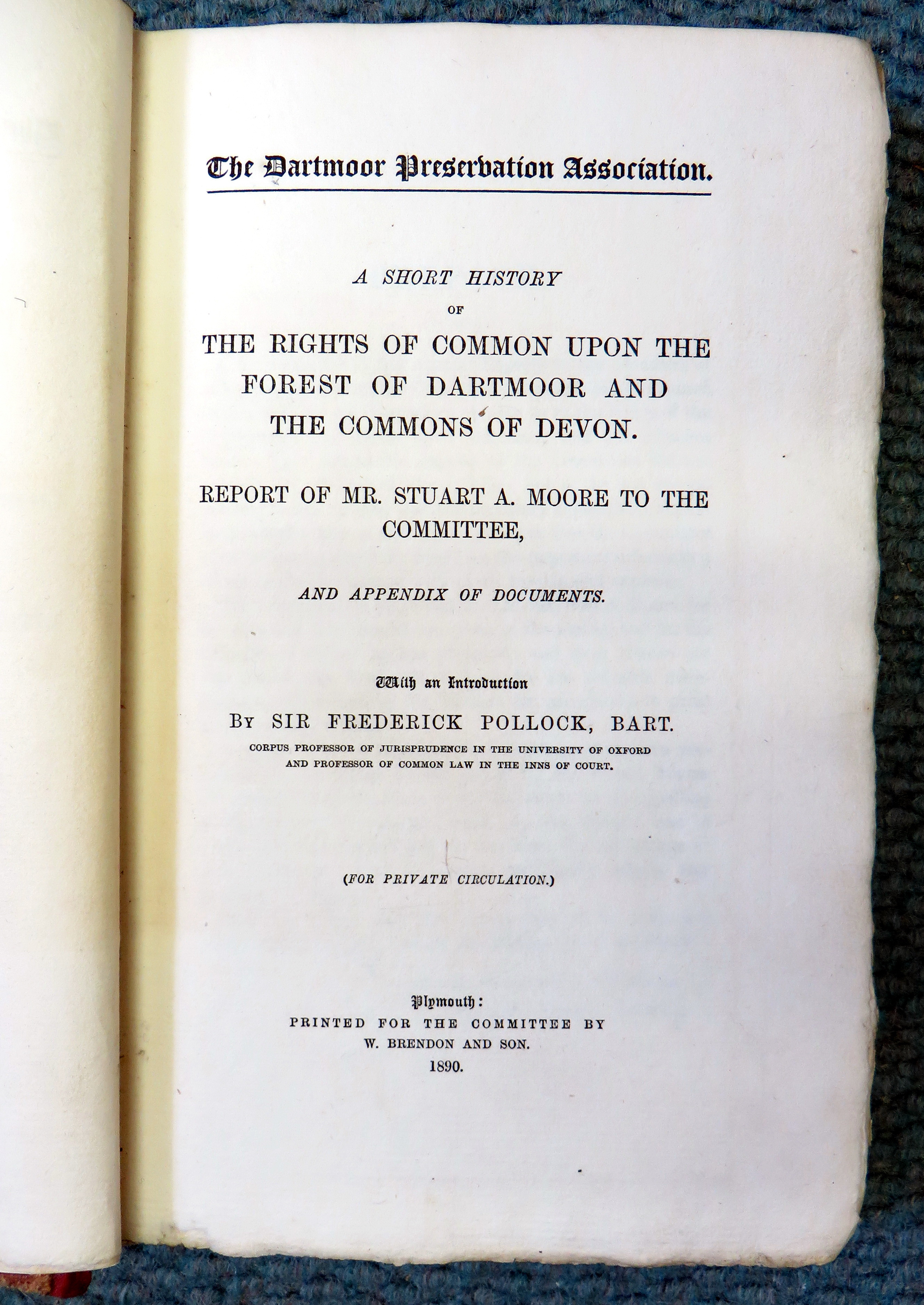
Frontispiece of DPA book about Commons and Commoners' Rights, published 1890

=== Commoners' rights ===
The first publication of the DPA, in 1890, was a short history of commoners' rights on Dartmoor and the commons of Devon. This notes a decrease in the numbers of animals even in medieval times: in 1296 – 5,000 cattle, 487 horses, 131 folds of sheep; in 1316 – 3,292 cattle, 368 horses, 100 folds of sheep. An important battle occurred in 1894 when the Corporation of London attempted to buy the whole of Dartmoor in order to pipe its water to Paddington alongside Brunel’s recently converted railway, when it went from broad gauge to standard gauge. The DPA led the revolt against this. In 1897, the DPA went to court to fight successfully the enclosure of a section of Peter Tavy Great Common, in support of a farmer. Commoners rights seem to have been a settled issue in recent years: except for where they are impinged upon by the military presence.

=== Military use ===
Dartmoor Training Area has been used regularly for military training since 1873, although it was used earlier during the Napoleonic and Crimean Wars. In 1906–07, seven miles of roads were built on the north moor to facilitate the movement of guns. There are three established firing ranges at Okehampton, Willsworthy and Merrivale. The area taken up with live firing ranges is 9,187 hectares (22,700 acres) and they are used on average 120 days each year. They are used for small arms, mortars and artillery smoke and illuminating shells.

The use of the moor by the military has been a major concern of the DPA since its founding. In its first year, Robert Burnard (DPA Secretary) persuaded the War Department not to fire on the Okehampton Firing Range on Saturdays so that there may be some public access to the area. Lady Sylvia Sayer was very outspoken about it being totally at odds with the area being designated as a National Park. In 1963 the DPA published a widely circulated 24-page booklet entitled Misuse of a National Park which includes photographs of unexploded shells lying on the open moor, corrugated iron buildings, large craters, a derelict tank used as a target, bullet marks on standing stones, etc. It also contains details of a 1958 incident in which a young boy was killed by a mortar shell near Cranmere Pool.

Since the 1960s there has been much less military damage and litter as a result of the DPA persuading the Services to be more cautious. The military have changed since the Victorian era, they now have 120 conservation groups across the Ministry of Defence (MOD), including Dartmoor Military Conservation Group. The current leases run for many years, with Cramber Tor most recently being granted a further 40-year licence.

=== Afforestation ===
Early afforestation occurred when Brimpts was planted with trees in 1862. The Forestry Commission was founded in 1919, following World War I and in that year the Duchy of Cornwall planted 800 acres of conifers at Fernworthy. In 1921, Plymouth Corporation planted conifers around Burrator Reservoir. The Forestry Commission planted Bellever and Laughter Tor farms in 1930-32 and in 1944-1945 Soussons Down was also planted. The DPA opposed these post-war plantings and R. Hansford Worth (1868–1950, a Plymouth engineer, scientist and antiquarian) delivered a lecture fiercely critical of the Duchy of Cornwall as the landowners at The Plymouth Athenaeum, using the argument of encroachment on the rights of common and loss of ancient monuments. DPA opposition to forestry on Dartmoor arose again in 1953 when it wrote a policy on woodlands in the then-new national park. Opposition was exercised when Hawn, Dendles and High House Wastes, all near Cornwood, were designated for tree planting in 1959. Argument continued while Hawns and Dendles Wastes were ploughed in 1960. High House Waste was purchased by the DPA in 1964 and the Nature Conservancy (UK) bought neighbouring Dendles in 1965. The situation in 2015 is that some of the Dartmoor plantations have been affected by the fungal disease Phytophthora ramorum which results in widespread clear felling to prevent further spread of the disease. The policy now is to replant with more native hardwood trees although more resistant conifers are also being used.

=== Reservoirs ===
There are eight Dartmoor reservoirs, with the earliest being Tottiford Reservoir, 1861. Three were built in the mid-20th century: Fernworthy, 1942; Avon, 1957 and Meldon, 1972, and the DPA fought many battles over these. It opposed plans for reservoirs on Brent Moor (1899) and Holne Moor (1901) where, later, the Avon Reservoir and Venford Reservoirs were respectively built. The DPA's opposition was supported in the House of Commons with argument made regarding the effects on the local water table. The DPA was one of many local and national amenity bodies that fought the building of the Meldon dam. The preservation battle for the Meldon valley was recorded in a DPA publication. The DPA offered a viable alternative site, Gorhuish Valley, for various reasons, including the fact that minerals such as arsenic would leach into the water supply if Meldon were selected. The Meldon story was discussed many times in Parliament. Another battle was fought against the flooding of the Swincombe valley to form another reservoir. This was rejected in parliament in 1970, revived in 1974 and finally resolved by the building of the Roadford Reservoir to the west of the moor. In 1985 the DPA used funds from a bequest to purchase 50 acres of land where the dam of a reservoir at Swincombe would have to be.

=== National Park designation ===
The National Parks and Access to the Countryside Act 1949 led to Dartmoor being one of the first four parks to be designated, by an order made on 15 August 1951 and confirmed on 30 October 1951. Shortly after this, the DPA tried to ensure that the new National Park was run by an independent committee and not by the Dartmoor Standing Committee that was a subcommittee of Devon County Council Planning Committee. The committee was reformed as Dartmoor National Park Committee under the Local Government Act 1972 but it was still a subcommittee of Devon County Council and as such it was not seen to be an independent guardian of the moor by the DPA. It was not until 1997 that an independent Dartmoor National Park Authority was enabled under the Environment Act 1995 as a free-standing local authority, forty-four years after the park was created, although it is still dominated by local authorities and government appointees.

=== North Hessary Tor TV mast ===
The DPA learned in October 1951 that the BBC planned to build a 750-foot television mast on North Hessary Tor, near Princetown, that was erected in 1955. This was to be a relay from a transmitting station at Wenvoe, South Wales. The DPA objected to this threat and sought expert opinion, offered alternative solutions, pressed for a public enquiry, engaged a lawyer, held public meetings, distributed pamphlets, wrote to the press and petitioned parliament. Eventually, a public enquiry was announced. When the decision was made to permit the mast, there were a number of conditions, included among them was that the development was built near the tor, leaving it still intact, and that its new approach road should not be fenced. During the process of obtaining land for the transmitter, one MP asked in the House of Commons: "Will the Assistant Postmaster-General bear in mind that we have no desire to hinder the provision of this station but that it is felt that ancient common rights such as these, that have existed for a thousand years, should be adequately protected or properly extinguished by due process of law?"

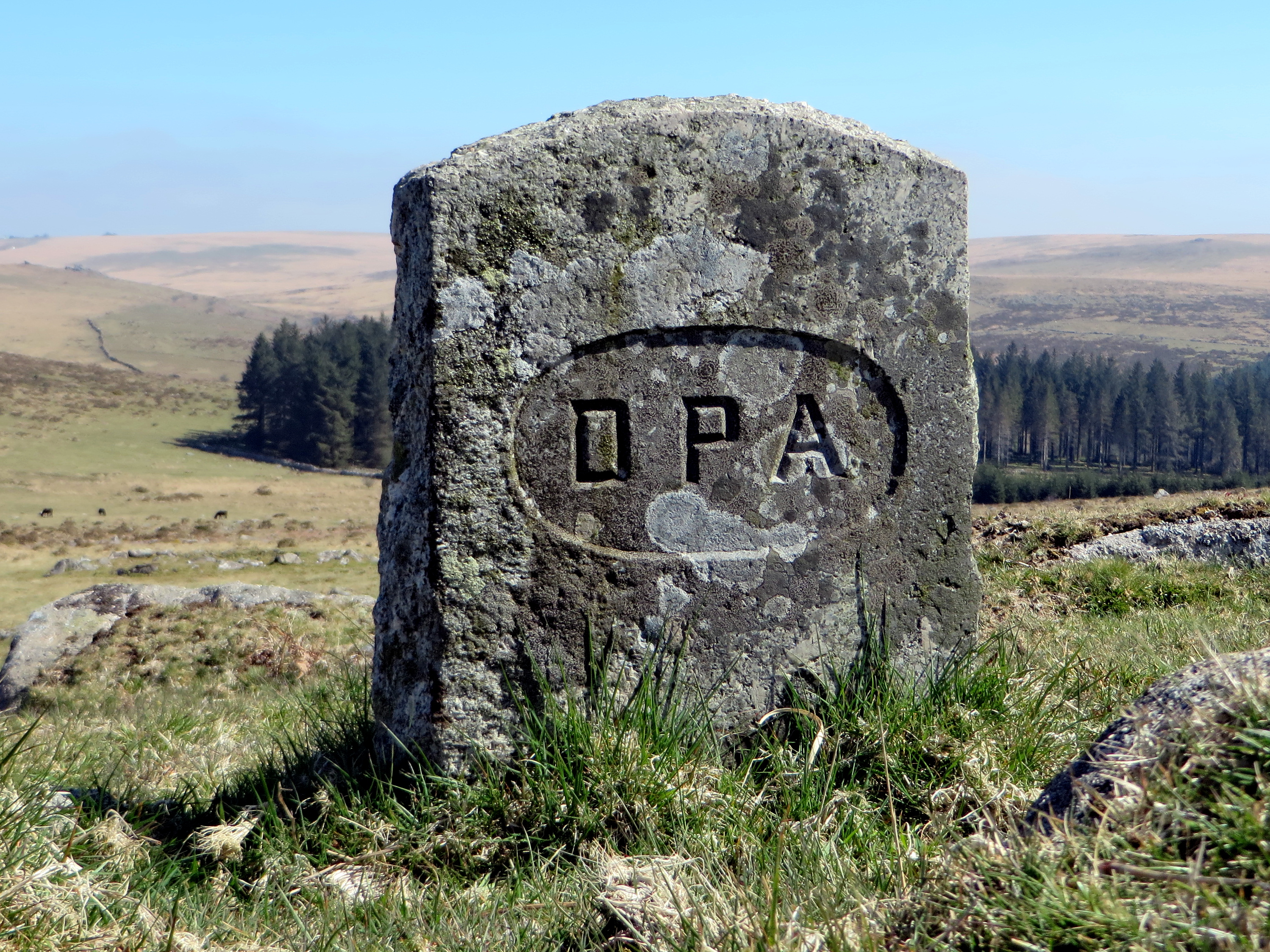
DPA boundary stone at Sharpitor

=== Sharpitor ===
During World War II, the Royal Air Force (RAF) built a mast and buildings on Peek Hill, as RAF Sharpitor. In 1956, permission was granted to rebuild the station as part of the "Gee" radio navigation system, to be occupied for ten years. There followed delay in leaving and a proposal was made in 1970 by Devon & Cornwall Police to use the mast, which was rejected. Then later that year Plymouth Corporation wanted to use the exposed site for housing juvenile offenders. This was also rejected, but Plymouth appealed. At a public enquiry in June 1973 Lady Sylvia Sayer represented the DPA and permission for development on the site was refused. A few years later, DPA fought successfully in support of South West Water (SWW) against renewed calls for a new reservoir at Swincombe. To mark the victory, Sylvia Sayer asked SWW if DPA could purchase the rocky outcrop of Sharpitor. The DPA purchased 32 acres in February 1984.

=== Okehampton bypass ===
Okehampton lies on the A30 main road, the shortest route from London to west Devon and Cornwall. The need for a bypass was mooted in 1963. In 1975, three routes were considered: a northern route through mainly farmland, a central route using a railway, and a southern route through Dartmoor National Park. In August 1976, the Department of the Environment announced the preferred route was through the National Park. A major event on the timeline of this project was a 96-day public enquiry from 1 May 1979 to 4 February 1980 held in Okehampton. In March 1984, the DPA with other organisations petitioned Parliament opposing compulsory purchase orders on public open spaces. The Secretary of State announced in July 1985 that he was introducing a bill to reverse the decision of a Joint Parliamentary Committee and confirm a route through the National Park. This was followed by a confirmation bill in November 1985 that was passed in the House of Lords on 5 December 1985. Construction started in November 1986 and the road was opened on 19 July 1988.

== Since 2000 ==
The DPA continues to follow the same objectives as when it was founded. The activities have widened, involving local partners, it has a calendar of events, walks and work days with its Conservation Team undertaking a variety of moorland projects, it funds the supply of walking boots to some children who need them for the Duke of Edinburgh Award Scheme through the Moor Boots Scheme, it collaborates with the Campaign for National Parks, it monitors the activities of Dartmoor National Park Authority who run the National Park. It objected to eight planning proposals (with success in seven cases), with many other achievements in the DPA Director's Annual Report. The DPA remains true to its original objectives and has also added other activities in support of Dartmoor and its inhabitants.

=== China clay expansion ===
The china clay industry on Dartmoor was established long before the DPA was founded. The earliest record of a china clay pit refers to Hook Lake in 1502. The area was surveyed around 1827 by Cornishmen with thirty years experience in the clay industry. They obtained a 21-year lease in 1830, from the Earl of Morley who owned the land, to work the area between Lee Moor and Shaugh Moor. A rival pit was opened at Leftlake in about 1850 and at Hemerdon and Broomage in about 1855. Further pits were opened at Cholwichtown, Whitehill Yeo and Wigford Down/Brisworthy (circa 1860). Others followed at Smallhanger and Headon in the 1870s. Redlake started working in 1910. China clay pits are open cast mines that result in large holes in the ground accompanied by large waste tips. Over time, the pits become larger and more ground is needed for the waste, changing the landscape: the effect of this can be seen from space.

The DPA argues that this is an activity that does not agree with the ethos of a National Park, whose purpose is to protect landscape from unsuitable development. In 1994, the National Park boundaries were changed to include common land at Shaugh Moor and exclude china clay worked land at Lee Moor. The DPA revived its campaign with the publication of a booklet in 1999 when the Blackabrook Valley, Crownhill Down and Shaugh Moor, near the popular tourist area of Cadover Bridge, all came under threat from exploitation or dumping of waste. The china clay companies relinquished planning permissions in 2001. However, in November 2009, the clay companies, Sibelco and Imerys, produced a report reviewing old mineral permissions under the Environment Act 1995 with a view to joining up two pits. A presumed Bronze Age barrow, known as Emmets Post, was to be removed and three other monuments may be affected. The DPA were recorded twice, with other bodies, in a Devon County Council Development Management Committee Report for their representations in securing the future of the three areas where planning permissions were relinquished in 2001. Oxford Archaeology held an open day during their excavation of Emmets Post in 2014 prior to its removal.

=== House of Lords reception ===
The DPA and Exmoor Society held a joint reception at the House of Lords on 6 November 2008, hosted by Baroness Mallalieu, to lobby members of both Houses of Parliament and relevant Ministers about ensuring that environmental schemes for the uplands are "fit for purpose". Both organisations funded an invited number of upland hill farmers to attend.

=== Whitehorse Hill excavation ===
The excavation in August 2011 on the north moor of a Bronze Age burial kistvaen, or cist, that was originally uncovered in 2001 was part-funded by the DPA, along with other bodies.

=== South West Uplands Federation Conference ===
A conference for the upland farmers of Bodmin Moor, Exmoor and Dartmoor was held as a joint venture between the South West Uplands Federation and the DPA. It was run by the DPA at Exeter Racecourse in October 2012, with 150 delegates. Speakers came from the Foundation for Common Land, the Forest of Dartmoor Commoners, the University of Gloucestershire, the National Farmers Union of England and Wales and the Open Spaces Society. The CEO raised sponsorship from Dartmoor National Park, Exmoor National Park, Natural England, Duchy of Cornwall and the Exmoor Society - this reflecting the standing of the DPA with those bodies.

=== Undergrounding power cables ===
Two major projects to underground overhead power cables in Dartmoor National Park have been completed in a joint project between Western Power Distribution, the South West Protected Landscapes Forum (SWPLF) and Dartmoor National Park Authority. The two schemes on Holne Moor and Walkhampton Common between them remove nearly 6 km of overhead line from open moorland. At nearly 5 km, the Walkhampton scheme is the largest to be undertaken in the South West region by Western Power Distribution. The old overhead line was readily visible from the B3212 Princetown to Yelverton Road, strung across Walkhampton Common from Devil's Elbow to just above Horseyeatt at Peek Hill. The works to provide the new underground supply were mainly undertaken on the highway to minimise the impact on the sensitive moorland landscape, its archaeology, wildlife and livestock. The DPA has supported the undergrounding of these visually intrusive power lines for many years.

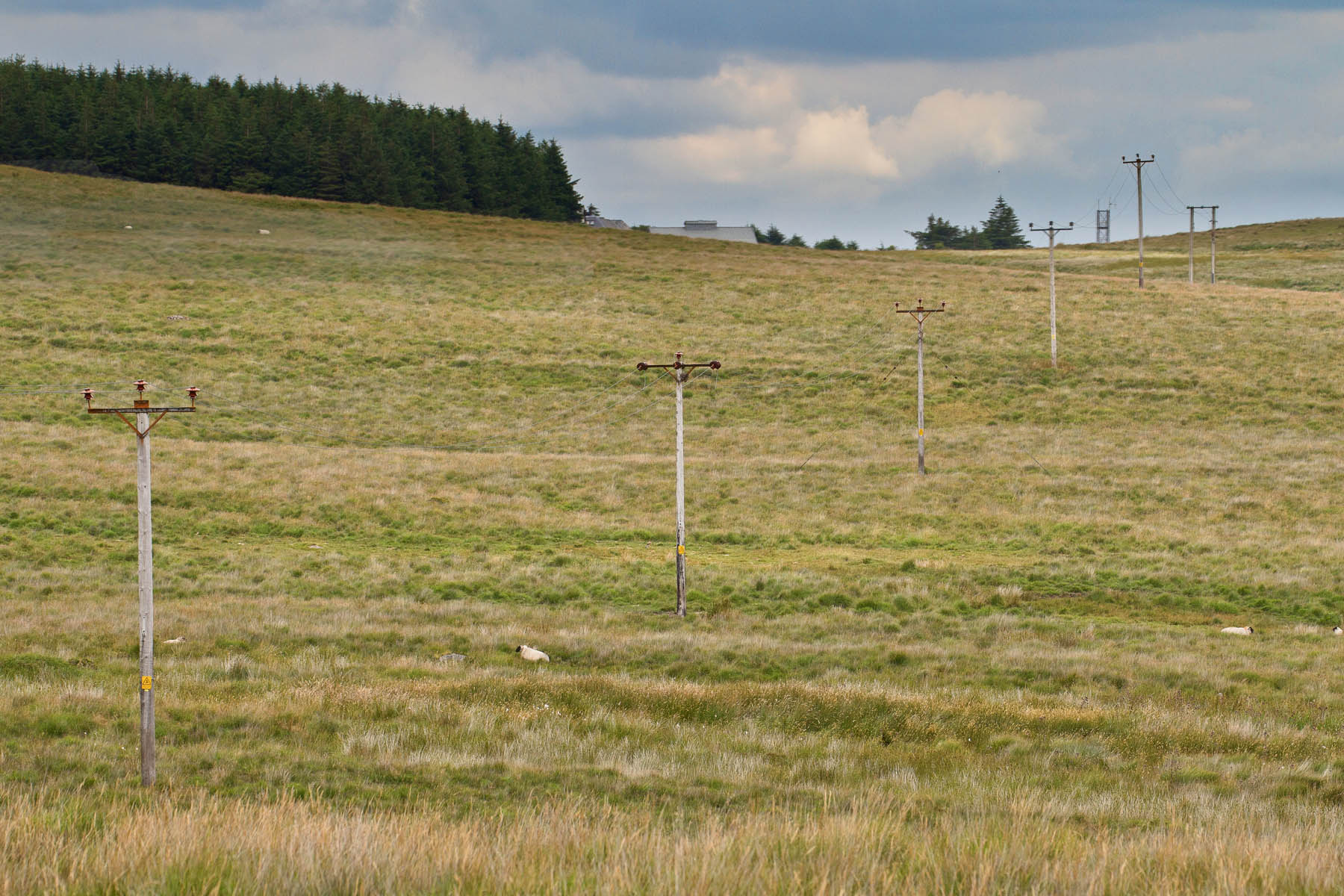
Walkhampton Common pylons and power cables before undergrounding

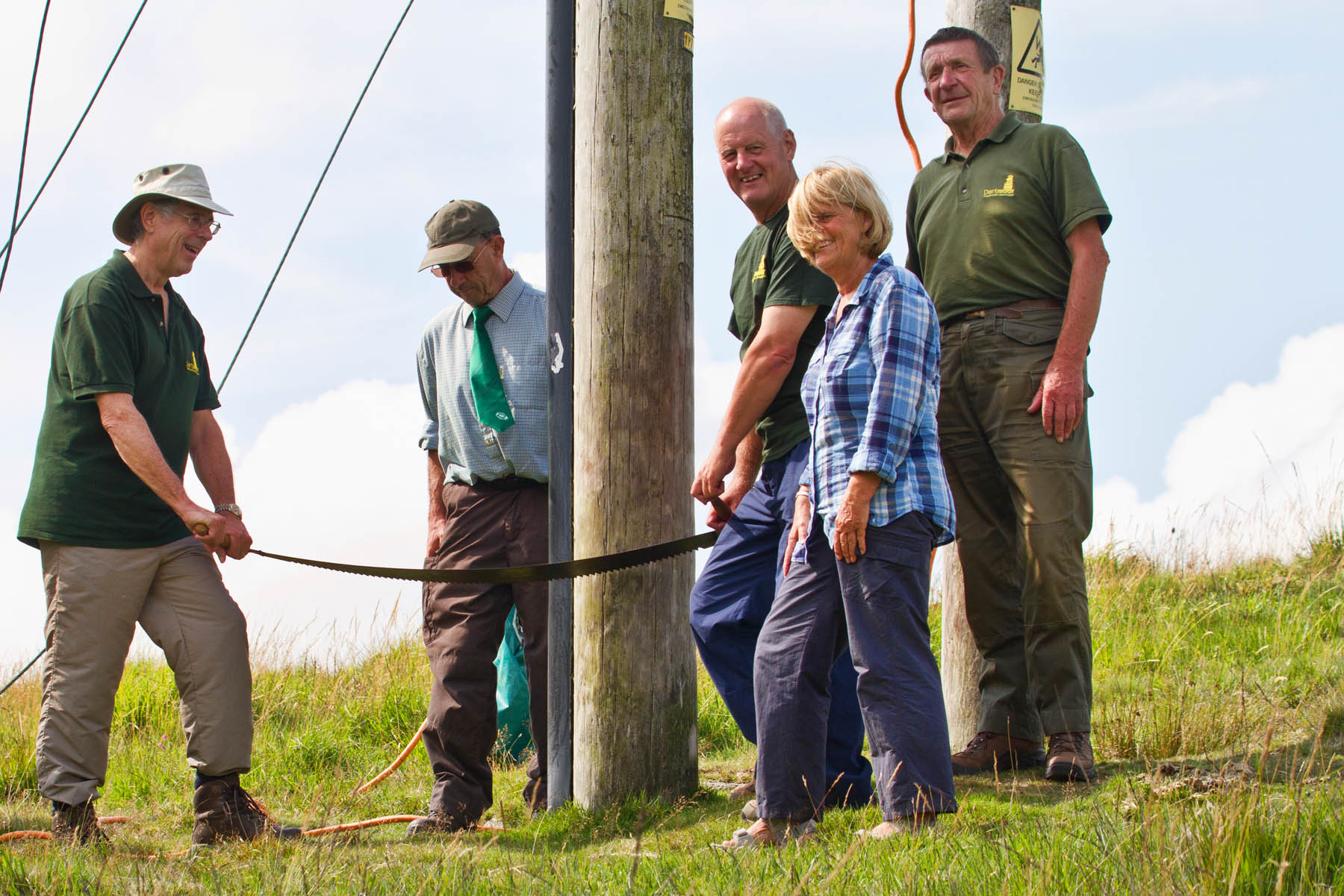
Walkhampton Common pylons during undergrounding, posing with a cross-cut saw for the local press

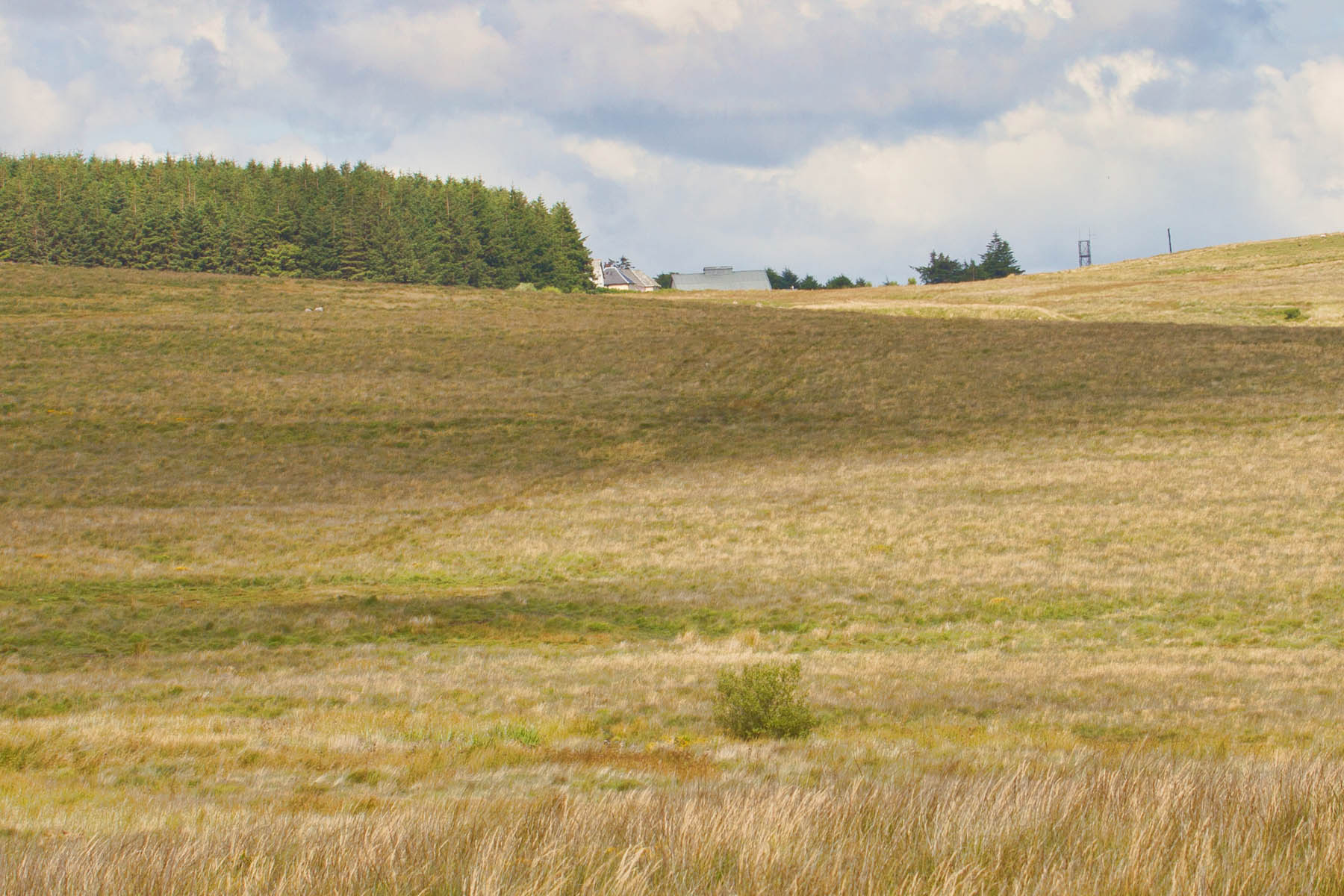
Walkhampton Common after undergrounding of the power cables

=== The Dartmoor Conservation Garden ===
The Dartmoor Conservation Garden is a joint project between DPA and Dartmoor National Park Authority (DNPA) and is located in the Jack Wigmore Garden behind the High Moorland Centre in Princetown: this is a memorial garden to a former Chair of the Authority. It is planted with a cross-section of typical native Dartmoor plants. It also houses some typical Dartmoor archaeological features, such as a 4,000-year-old Bronze Age burial kistvaen (or cist) and a medieval granite cross from Ter Hill. This marked the Monk's Path but was constantly being pushed over by cattle. The purpose of the Garden is to illustrate the biodiversity on Dartmoor. The project came online in June 2015.

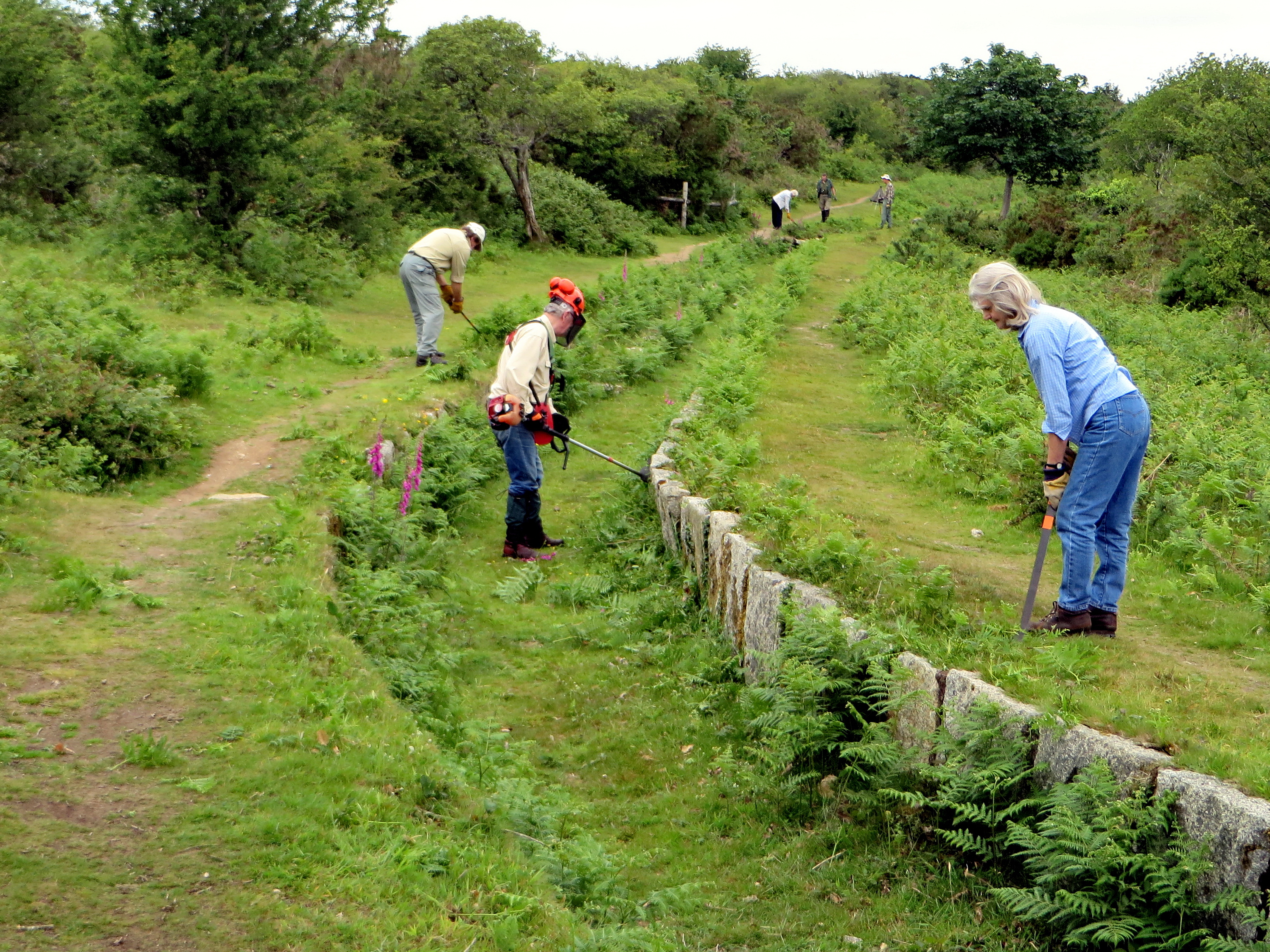
DPA Conservation Team volunteers cutting bracken in Drake's Plymouth Leat, June 2015

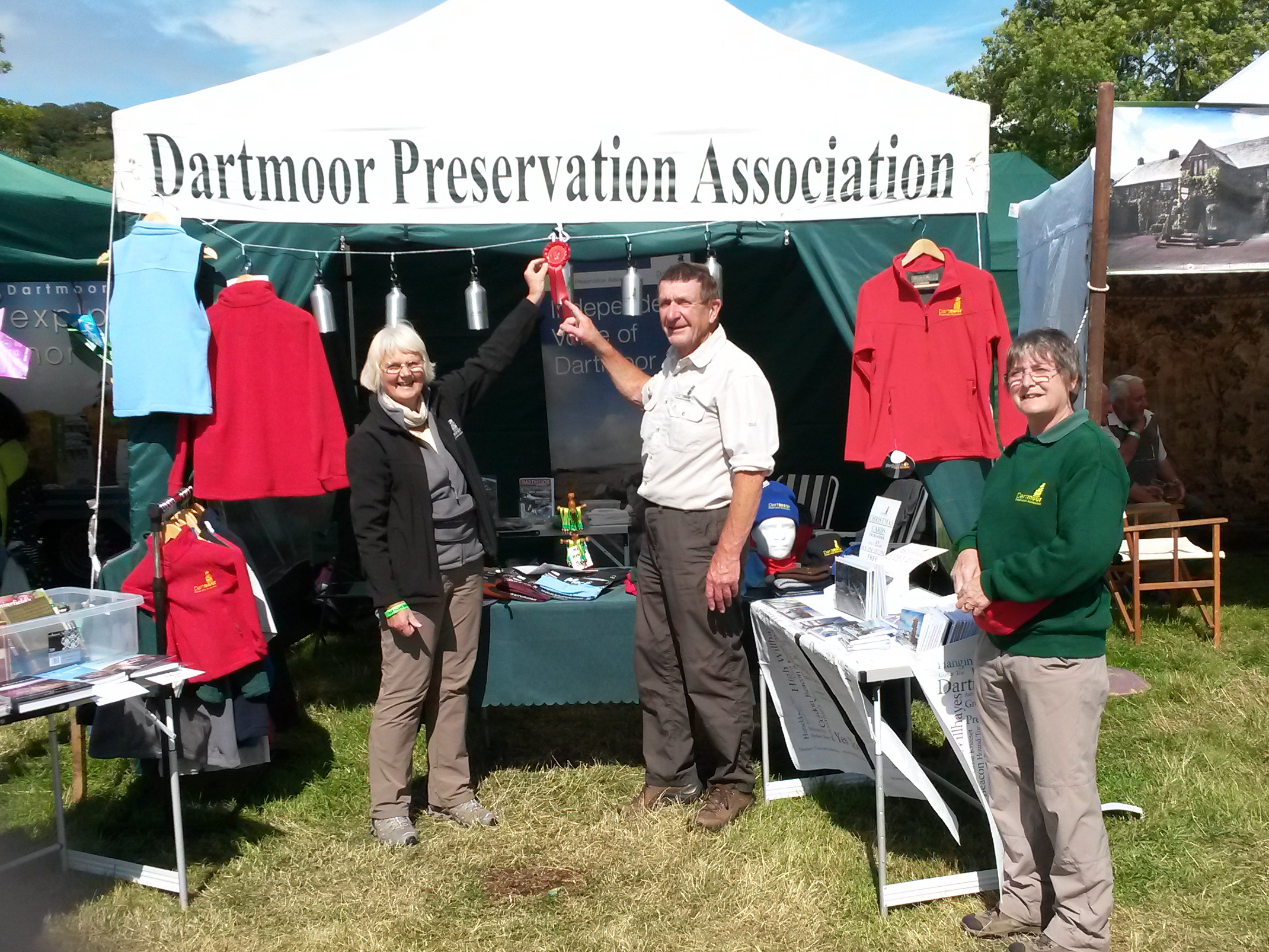
DPA stand at Chagford Fair, with 2nd Place Rosette in the Trade Section for stand presentation, August 2014

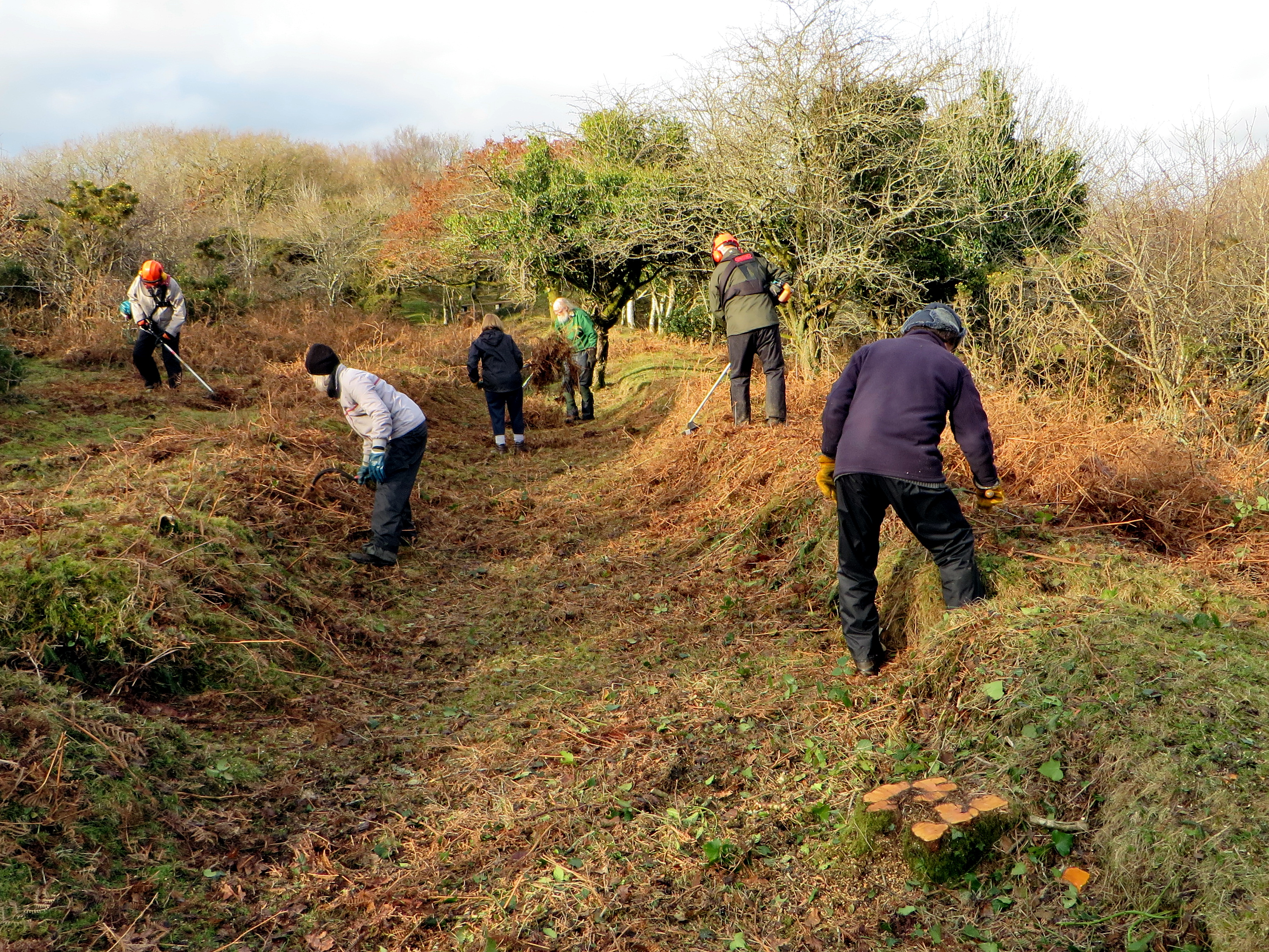
Conservation Team volunteers clearing scrub on Devonport Leat, January 2015

=== Widecombe telecommunications mast ===
The DPA were involved in a campaign in June 2015 against four telecommunications masts planned for Dartmoor, with the first to be erected in the village of Widecombe. At short notice, the DPA banners were taken out, letters written, press interviews given and support given to the villagers when an inflatable mast was demonstrated – with the effect that the planning application was withdrawn.

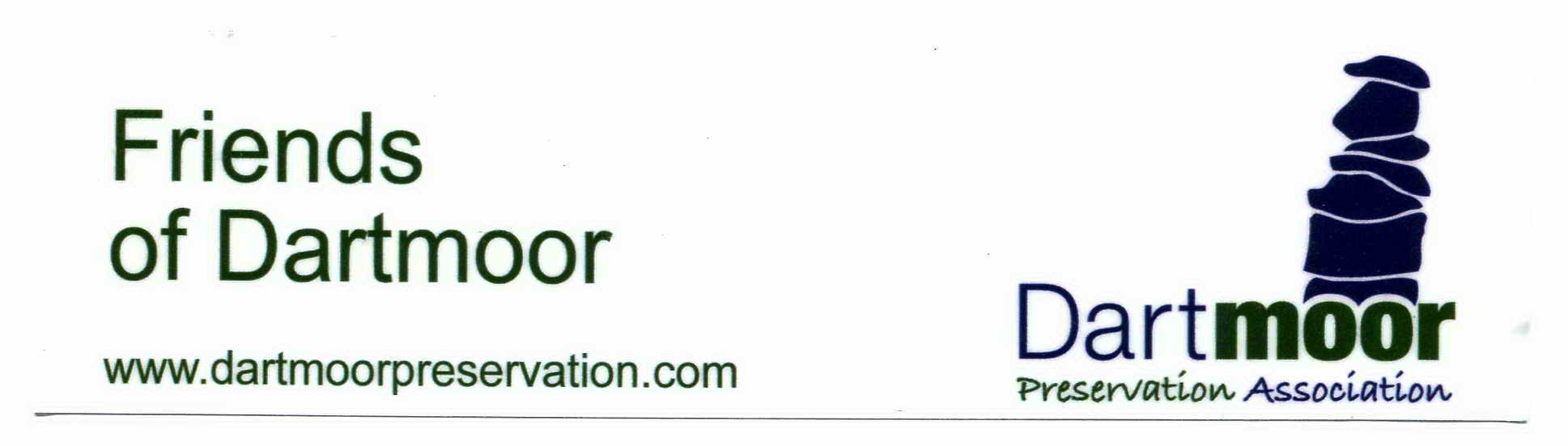
Friends of Dartmoor Car Sticker

=== Friends of Dartmoor ===
In common with other amenity bodies, such as those for the Lake District, Peak District, Pembrokeshire Coast, Yorkshire Dales Three Peaks and the New Forest Trust, the image of Dartmoor Preservation Association is evolving from its Victorian origins, although the original name is being retained. Friends of Dartmoor projects a more modern image of preservation where several years of diplomacy have achieved good relations with the partner agencies that operate in the Dartmoor arena. This is due mainly to the efforts of the previous CEO, James Paxman and his successor, Phil Hutt.

=== Constitution, objectives and policies ===
The DPA Constitution, objectives and policies are published on the DPA web site.

The objectives enshrined in the constitution are the protection, preservation and enhancement in the public interest of the landscape, antiquities, flora and fauna, natural beauty, cultural heritage and scientific interest of Dartmoor. Also the protection and preservation of public access to and on Dartmoor subject to the ancient rights of commoners. Co-operation with the commoners and any organisation in achieving DPA objectives, also the study of and the recording and publication of information upon the antiquities, history and natural history of Dartmoor.

The DPA has twenty-two policies listed on its web site: regarding access and rights of way, fencing, protecting monuments, diverse habitats, bracken, china clay quarrying, military training and live firing, hill farming and small scale traditional local industries, quarrying, television and telephone masts, wind farms, planning applications, housing developments, woodlands and forestry, ponies, swaling, and recreational activities.

=== Conservation ===
The DPA conservation team meet throughout the year to work on a number of ongoing projects; from gorse clearance, to habitat protection and archaeological surveying. A quarterly timetable is released both on the organisation's website and through its member publications, along with details of how to get involved. The team also host an annual open day at the DPA land holding of Pudsham Meadows.

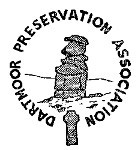
DPA logo from 1966, with Nun's Cross incorporated

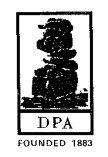
DPA logo from 1969

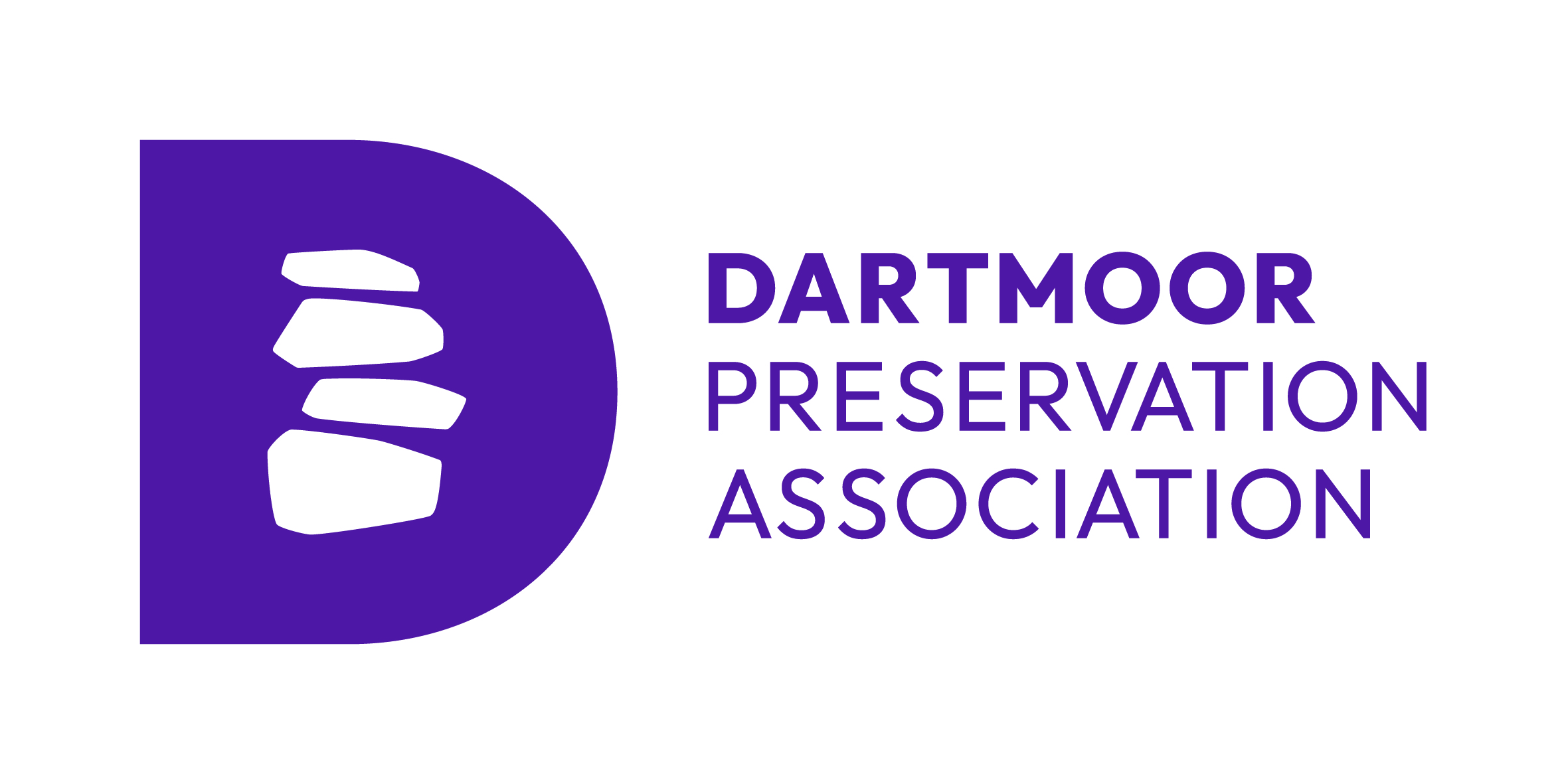
2023 Logo including the original reference to Nun's Cross in minimalist form
