= List of reservoirs on Dartmoor =

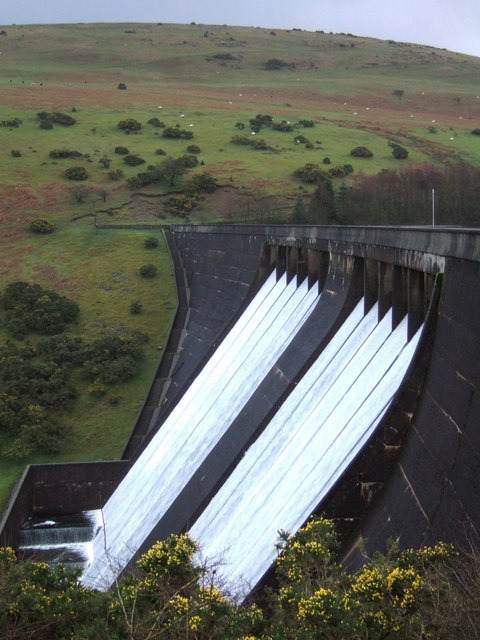
Meldon Dam - overflow

Over the course of the 19th and 20th centuries, eight reservoirs and dams were built in the area now covered by Dartmoor National Park in Devon, England (six before the park was designated, and two after), to supply drinking water to the rapidly growing towns in the surrounding lowlands. With its deep valleys and high rainfall, Dartmoor was a natural location. New reservoirs continued to be built even after the establishment of the National Park in 1951.

Early schemes to use the moors as a source of drinking water involved the construction of water channels called leats. For example, Drake's Leat (completed 1591) took water to Plymouth, and the Devonport Leat (1793) to the docks at Devonport. Rapid population growth of the coastal communities in the late 19th century and the birth of tourism required a significant improvement in quality and quantity of fresh water.

The first Dartmoor reservoir, Tottiford, opened in 1861 and heralded a busy era of dam construction which continued through to 1907, by which time the Dartmoor area was the site of five reservoirs. Three more followed during the mid- to late 20th century. A fourth, in the valley of the River Swincombe, was rejected by the advisory committee of the County Council.

A few long-established Dartmoor farms had to be abandoned and disappeared under the water as a result. During years of drought, some ruins can once again become visible. At Fernworthy, for example, low water levels often reveal the remains of Fernworthy Farm and a small granite clapper bridge which once crossed the South Teign River. At Avon dam, hut circles are visible at very low water levels. In 2011 an episode of Time Team was devoted to archaeological features discovered in the bed of Tottiford Reservoir.

The final reservoir completed in the park was the Meldon Reservoir, which was completed in 1972.

Reservoir	Image	Coordinates	OS grid ref	Opened	Notes
Tottiford	Tottiford Dam	50.636°N 3.683°W	SX810832	1861	Expanded 1865. Fed by Kennick Reservoir
Kennick	Kennick Reservoir - geograph.org.uk - 37698	50.647°N 3.694°W	SX803843	1884	Fed by three minor streams
Burrator	Burrator	50.500°N 4.039°W	SX554686	1898	Expanded 1929. Fed by River Meavy, Narrator Brook, Newleycombe Lake, Sheepstor Brook and the Devonport Leat. Includes Sheepstor Dam.
Venford	Venford Dam and spillway	50.524°N 3.856°W	SX685709	1907	
Trenchford	Pier, Trenchford Reservoir - geograph.org.uk - 1262554	50.630°N 3.691°W	SX805824	1907	Fed by Trenchford Stream
Fernworthy	Fernworthy Reservoir	50.641°N 3.889°W	SX665840	1942	Fed by South Teign River, Assycombe Brook, Lowton Brook and others
Avon Dam	Avon Dam	50.473°N 3.865°W	SX677653	1957	Fed by River Avon and Brockhill Stream
Meldon	Meldon Dam	50.703°N 4.040°W	SX560912	1972	Fed by West Okement River
