= Sylvia Sayer =

British environmental conservator

Sylvia Sayer in May 1983

Sylvia Rosalind Pleadwell Sayer, Lady Sayer (6 March 1904 – 4 January 2000), was a passionate conservationist and environmental campaigner on behalf of Dartmoor, an area of mostly granite moorland in Devon in the south-west of England. She was chairman of the Dartmoor Preservation Association from 1951 to 1973, and remained deeply involved with the organisation until her death.

== Biography ==
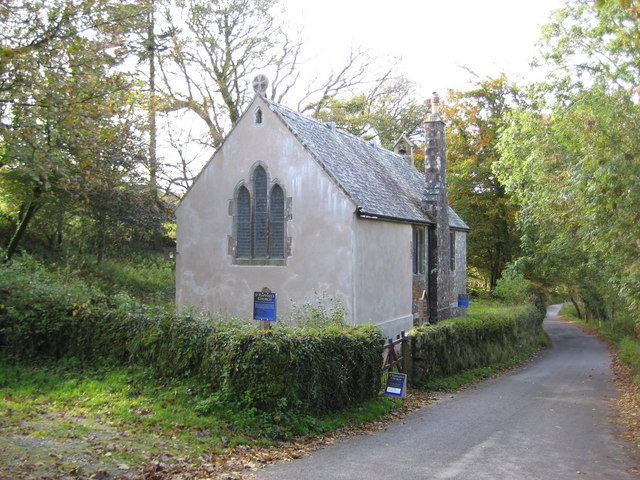
St Raphael's Church at Huccaby which contains a memorial to Sayer's mother, Olive Munday

Sayer's grandfather was Robert Burnard (1848–1920), who with Sabine Baring-Gould performed the first scientific excavations of ancient monuments on Dartmoor, including Grimspound; and who was one of the founding members in 1883 of the Dartmoor Preservation Association. He leased Huccaby House, on the West Dart River, near Hexworthy, from the Duchy of Cornwall and Sayer used to visit as a child.

Her mother was Olive Louise Munday (born Burnard; c. 1873–1960), Robert Burnard's eldest daughter. Her father was the Principal Medical Officer at the Naval Hospital School in Greenwich. She attended Princess Helena College in Ealing, and then the Central School of Art in London. In 1925 she married Guy Sayer, who was a midshipman in the Royal Navy, and they spent some time in China. Three years later they bought Old Middle Cator, a dilapidated Dartmoor longhouse about two miles west of the village of Widecombe-in-the-Moor in Dartmoor. They had twin sons, Geoffrey and Oliver, born in 1930, and until World War Two the family travelled widely to meet the needs of Guy's navy career. After VE Day, Guy was posted to the Far East and Sylvia settled at Cator and became interested in local politics, at first as a parish councillor for Widecombe, then as a Rural District Councillor and a member of the Dartmoor Sub-Committee of Devon County Council.

Lady Sayer acquired her title in 1959 when her husband was knighted on his retirement as the vice-admiral commanding the Reserve Fleet. After his retirement he spent much of his time helping his wife with her conservation work. She was chairman of the Dartmoor Preservation Association between 1951 and 1973, and after that, as its patron, she continued to attend virtually every meeting of its executive committee until 1999.

She lived at Cator almost until her death, moving to a nursing home in Chagford two weeks before. On 10 February 2000 a service of celebration for her life was held in the parish church of Widecombe-in-the-Moor. It was attended by over 300 people, including representatives of the Dartmoor National Park Authority, the Association of National Park Authorities, the Council for National Parks, the Campaign to Protect Rural England (CPRE), the Ramblers' Association, and the Duchy of Cornwall.

== Conservation work ==
Sayer was described in The Times newspaper in 1971 as "a militant conservationist, who is a full-time thorn in the sides of those authorities and others who want to flood, fence, dig up, knock down and otherwise damage the Dartmoor national park." Crispin Gill wrote about her in his introduction to Dartmoor – A New Study published in 1970 as having "roused the conscience of a [vast] number of people" and he described her as an indefatigable worker with an enormous knowledge; he also referred to Henry Slesser's description of her as "the shield of the moor".

She regularly wrote letters to newspapers, both local and national, about matters related to Dartmoor. In her first published letter to The Times, in 1948, she expressed concerns about local authorities (specifically Devon County Council) seeking to subvert the implementation of Arthur Hobhouse's recommendations for the creation of national parks by demanding that they retain their own planning powers. She noted that local authorities had been unable to control development by Government departments in areas such as Dartmoor, referring to the 32,800 acres held by the Admiralty and War Department and the 3,763 acres that had been taken by the Forestry Commission. She also referred to Dartmoor's uniqueness in that most of it was owned by the Duchy of Cornwall which, as a department of the Crown, could basically do what it liked with its land. She urged that control of the soon-to-be-formed National Parks should be at the highest possible level within the Government so there would be a chance of exercising control over the Duchy and other Government departments.

The National Parks and Access to the Countryside Act 1949 created the National Parks Commission whose first chairman was Sir Patrick Duff. Ten National Parks were created in the 1950s under this Act – Dartmoor National Park was the fourth to be created, in October 1951. It was administered by Dartmoor National Park Authority which was a special committee of Devon County Council and subsidiary to the County Planning Committee which could veto its recommendations. Sayer was a member of the committee from its formation, but she resigned in 1957 in protest at its failure to protect the moor as she would wish.

=== TV mast ===
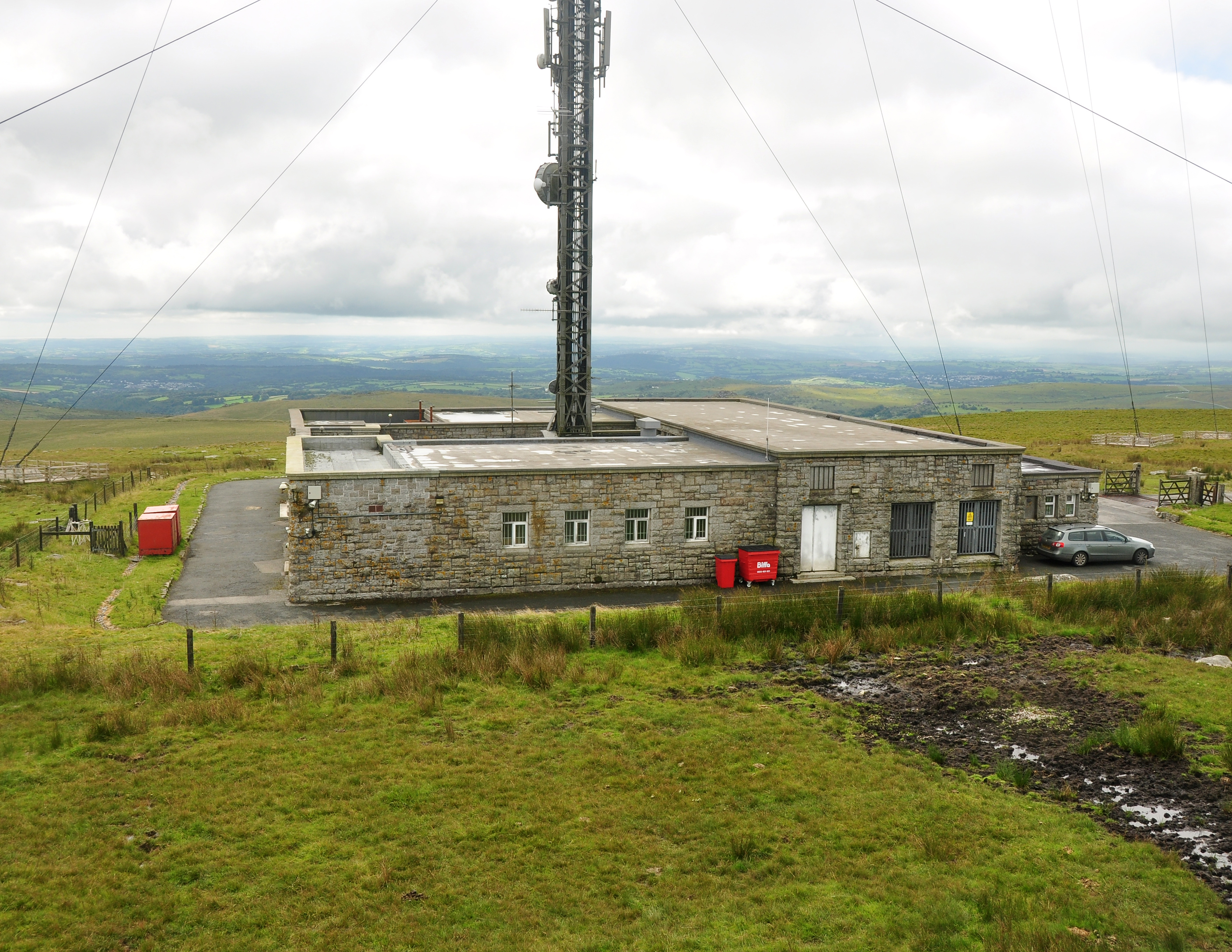
North Hessary Tor transmitting station and base of mast in 2010

As chairman of the Dartmoor Preservation Association (DPA), Sayer was heavily involved in all that organisation's fights for what it saw as conservation issues. The first of these was against the proposed installation of a television transmitting mast on North Hessary Tor in the centre of the moor. When the Dartmoor Standing Committee voted in June 1952 to approve the application, Sayer complained that it had relied on the casting vote of the chairman in the absence of three members who would have voted against.

Continued objection from Sayer and the DPA, and the CPRE, led to a public enquiry which took place in September 1953. Sir Patrick Duff, the National Parks Commission chairman, was well briefed by Sayer and at the enquiry his case was mainly based on the damage the mast would do to the scenery of the moor. Although congratulatory letters were passed between all the main objectors after the enquiry, the ministry granted the planning application in January 1954, though with some minor provisos to minimise the impact. Although Duff had failed to stop the installation of the mast, Sayer rewarded him for his efforts with a painting of North Hessary Tor saying it was "almost the last representation of that landscape that can be made while it is still unshadowed and unspoiled".

=== The military ===
...determined and articulate, Sylvia was single-minded in her pursuit of the things she believed in. Never a compromiser, she was unimpressed by the size and power of her adversaries, whom she would fight to a standstill when the occasion demanded. Many respected her as a foe...

— Address by Geoffrey Sayer, her son, at the thanksgiving service for her life, 10 February 2000.

From 1955 onwards Sayer kept up a correspondence about the military roads that lead across the northern moor from Okehampton Camp.

In 1966 she and her husband deliberately interrupted live-firing exercises on Dartmoor's Royal Marines firing range to inspect and photograph any damage done to a prehistoric stone row. In February 1967 she disrupted a large-scale mock battle at Ringmoor Down that involved low-flying helicopters. She told the press that she did this to exercise her rights and to ensure that no damage was caused to ancient monuments, pointing out that the public could not be excluded from the area involved because it was not a firing area, and that sheep and ponies had been frightened away as the helicopters converged – "it could have been pony trekkers and hikers and might have resulted in a serious accident", she said.

=== Reservoirs ===
In the late 1960s and early 1970s she was involved, as DPA chairman, with the disputes over the proposed construction of two new reservoirs on Dartmoor. The largest, which was to supply Plymouth, was known as "Swincombe" after the small River Swincombe that flows through Foxtor Mires, the proposed site of the reservoir. The proposal was eventually rejected in December 1970 at the Bill's committee stage, and a reservoir known as Roadford Lake was built west of the moor near the village of Broadwoodwidger instead.

However, the Meldon Reservoir on the north-west edge of the moor was passed, despite claims that the water would be poisoned by arsenic and lead because of the presence of three disused metalliferous mines and their spoil heaps in the area to be flooded. The dam was built in 1972, and in that year Sayer wrote a 62-page booklet entitled The Meldon Story that was published by the DPA. After expounding at length all the arguments made against building a dam at Meldon and in favour of an alternative site at Gorhuish, and the responses from the establishment, it ended with this statement:

The effect on the younger generation of the methods of present-day misgovernment is alarming but inevitable. When they utterly despair of a fair hearing or a just decision, they tend to stop talking and reach for the nearest brick. And who can blame them? Certainly we do not. We well know that the provocation to lawlessness often starts in Whitehall.

=== China clay workings ===
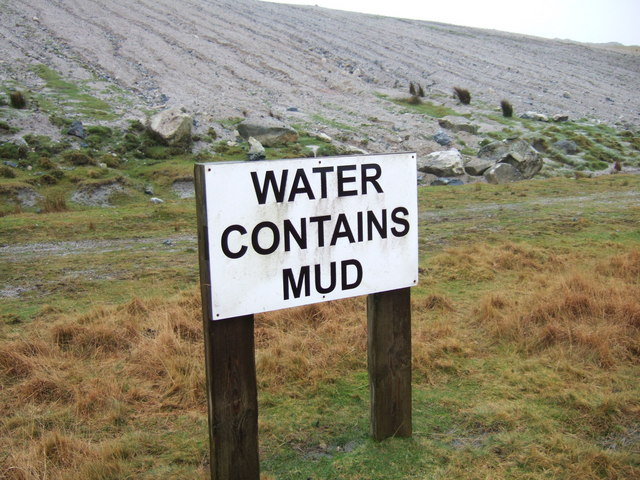
The china clay tips on the edge of Shaugh Moor in 2007

Following these efforts, she concentrated on the two companies involved in the extraction of china clay in the south west of the moor. They had permission dating from 1951 to expand their pits and tips. Shaugh Moor is an adjacent area that is rich in ancient monuments and it was there that the companies planned to tip the vast quantities of spoil that is generated from clay extraction. At the time the area became known as "Area Y", from an explanatory diagram that Sayer had drawn. The activism culminated in an adjournment debate in the House of Commons in which Janet Fookes, a Plymouth MP, argued against irreparably damaging the ancient landscape. In June 1978, the two companies agreed to share their waste tips, as Sayer had recommended, saving Shaugh Moor.

=== Okehampton bypass ===
In the 1970s there were plans to create a bypass for the A30 road around the town of Okehampton on the northern edge of Dartmoor. Two alternative routes were proposed: a northern one through agricultural land, or a southern one which would encroach on the National Park. After a public enquiry was held in 1979 and 1980 arguments continued for over five years with Sayer vigorously opposing the route through the moor. The matter was finally settled when the southern route was approved in December 1985 by the House of Lords. After the decision had been made, Sayer wrote a letter to Peter Bottomley, the then Minister of Transport that included the following extract:

The end of the Lords debate, when the vote was about to be taken and the half-empty Chamber suddenly filled up with well-wined and dined Lordships totally ignorant of the facts but jovially resolved to vote as directed, was only too typical of the whole disastrous charade...

=== Other ===
She opposed proposals to build a new Dartmoor Prison at Princetown in the centre of the moor in 1959. In the 1960s she complained about off-road car parking, and the poor treatment of Dartmoor ponies by those who only keep them for the subsidies they can obtain.

In 1983 she refused an invitation from the Prince of Wales to attend the launch of the Duchy of Cornwall's management plan for Dartmoor, since it allowed for a continuance of military usage. She was also one of a deputation who met the Prince in 1990 to explain to him why they thought he should not renew the military licences for a further term. However, the licences were renewed that year until 2011.

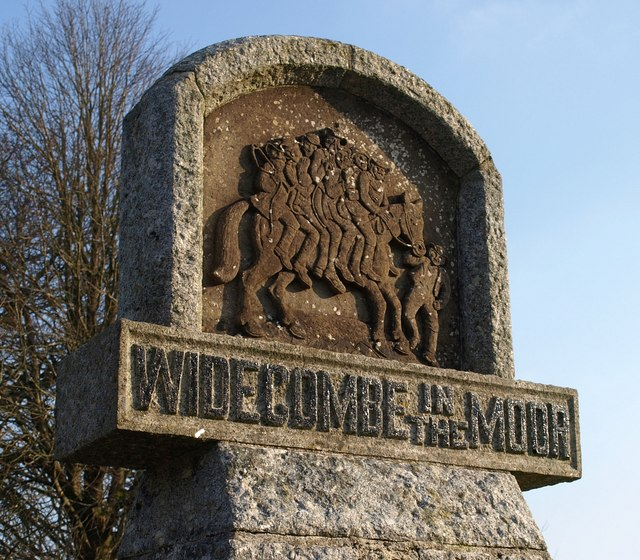
The village sign at Widecombe-in-the-Moor, designed by Sayer in the late 1940s

== Legacy ==
The DPA set up a Lady Sayer Land Purchase Fund after her retirement as chairman in 1973. It was used in 1984 to purchase 32 acres of land at Sharpitor, near Burrator Reservoir, in celebration of the successful fight against the Swincombe reservoir. As of March 2013 the fund held about £29,400.

On the centenary of her birth in 2004 John Bainbridge, the then chief executive of the DPA, revealed plans to memorialise Sayer by organising annual walks to some part of Dartmoor that she had saved, and also by holding an annual Sylvia Sayer lecture given by a prominent speaker.

Writing in 2009 in Dartmoor – A Statement of its Time, one of the New Naturalist series of books, Professor Ian Mercer (former Chief Officer of the Dartmoor National Park Authority), said of Sayer:

She was the scourge of farmers, foresters, quarrymen, civil [...] engineers, of generals and even of the National Park Authority when its professed pragmatism appeared to her, in the sort of words that she would use, 'snivelling cowardice'. [...] No modern history of Dartmoor would be valid without reference to her, but quite naturally reactions to her actions and statements divided the world of Dartmoor stakeholders for 50 years.

== Sources ==
- Hamilton-Leggett, Peter (1992). The Dartmoor Bibliography. Tiverton: Devon Books. ISBN 0-86114-873-8.
- Kelly, Matthew (2015). Quartz and Feldspar – Dartmoor: A British Landscape in Modern Times. London: Jonathan Cape. ISBN 978-0-22409-113-8.
- "Tribute to Sylvia Sayer". DPA News – the Newsletter of the Dartmoor Preservation Association (142). May 2000.
