= Devonport Leat =

Leat in Devon, England

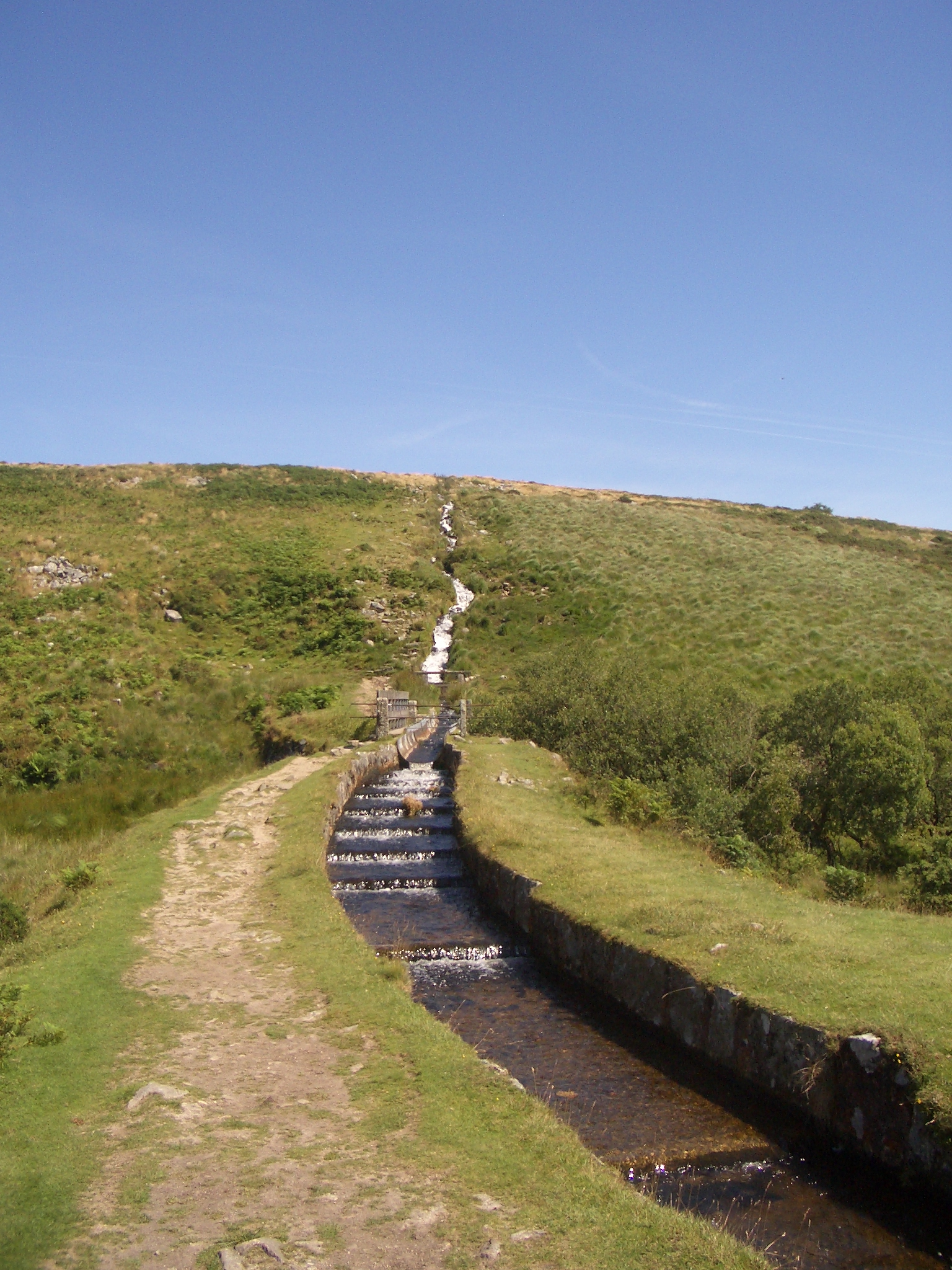
- Devonport Leat looking East towards Cramber Tor at Raddick Hill Falls
- Coordinates: 50.5802°N 3.9620°W

Location
- Interactive map of Devonport Leat

The Devonport Leat is a leat in Devon constructed in the 1790s to carry fresh drinking water from the high ground of Dartmoor to the expanding dockyards at Plymouth Dock (which was renamed Devonport on 1 January 1824).

== Feedwaters ==
It is fed by five Dartmoor rivers: the West Dart, the Cowsic, the Hart Tor Brook, the River Meavy and the Blackabrook (this last apparently was the first portion to supply Plymouth Dock).

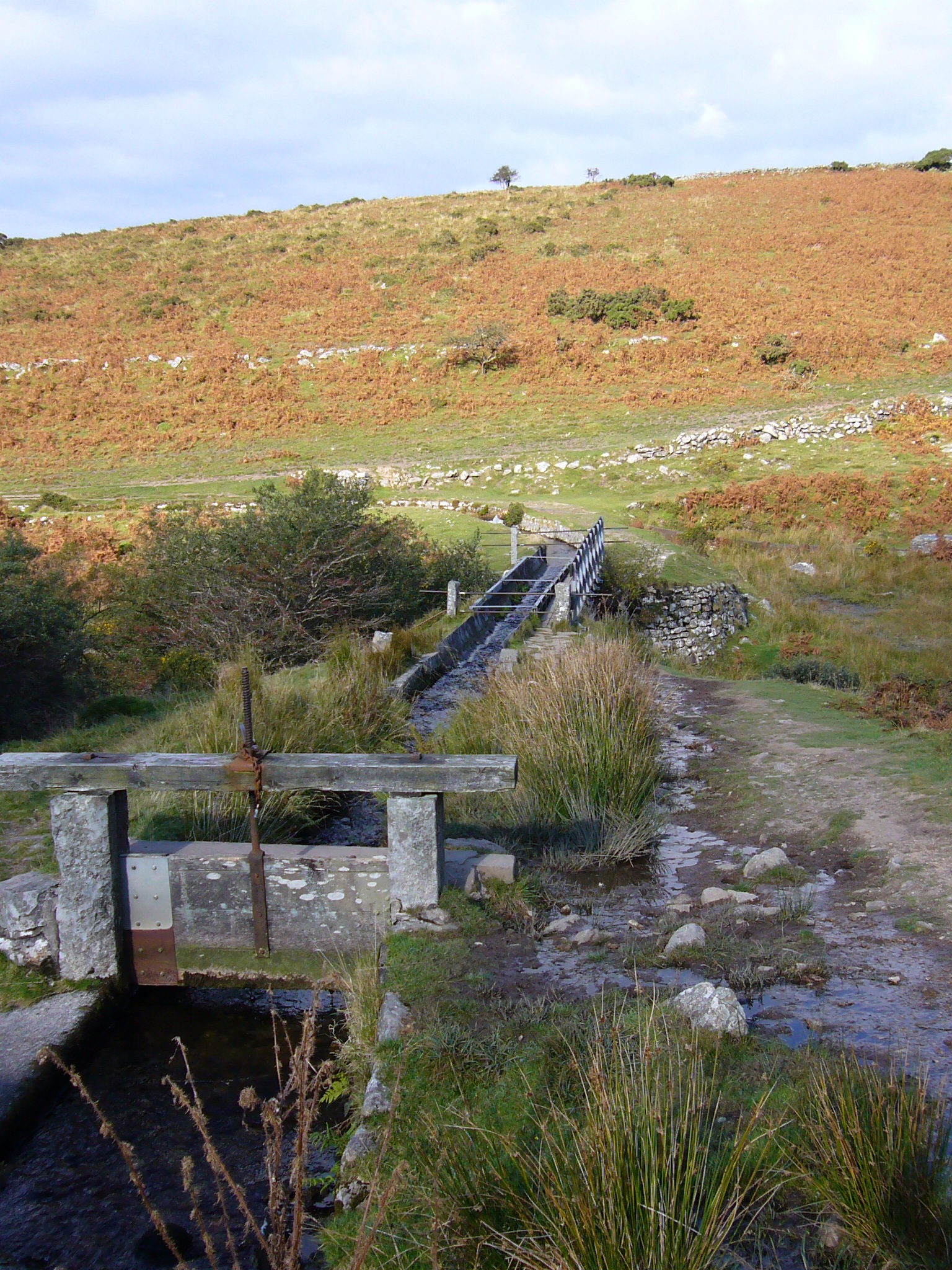
Aqueduct on the leat near Burrator Reservoir over the River Meavy

== Construction ==
Dartmoor granite was used to construct the water channel, as well as a small aqueduct and a tunnel.

== Historic changes ==
It was originally designed to carry water all the way to Plymouth Dock, a total distance of 27 miles (43 km), but has since been shortened and the operational part of the leat now stops near the Burrator Reservoir dam. Some of the water goes through underground pipes to the water treatment works at Dousland; the rest goes into the Burrator Reservoir which provides most of the water supply of Plymouth. For part of the route to Dousland the pipes follow the route of the disused Yelverton to Princetown Railway. Before the piped supply to Dousland was installed, the water was used for a hydroelectric turbine near Yelverton Reservoir and fed by a 12-inch-diameter (300 mm) pipe.

== Route ==
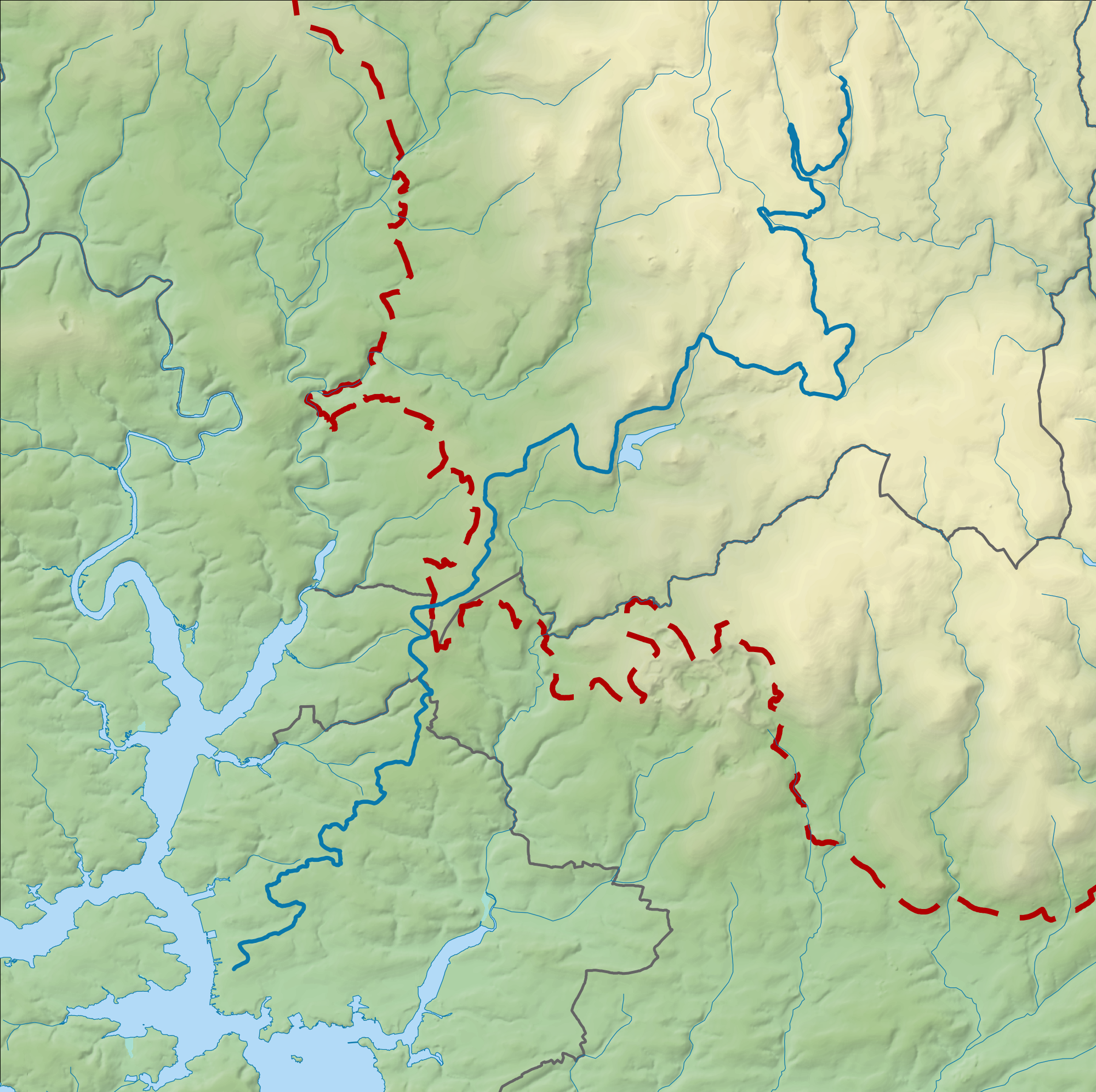
Route of Devonport Leat (blue); dashed red line shows edge of Dartmoor National Park

The Devonport Leat begins a short distance to the north of Wistman's Wood at an altitude of over 410 metres (1,350 ft) and twice passes close to Two Bridges (following the contours up the Cowsic valley in between) before heading towards Princetown. Its water supply now ends up in Burrator Reservoir. It follows a meandering path across the moor, carefully selected by engineers to follow the natural contours of the land.

== See also ==
- Drake's Leat
