= Drake's Leat =

Aqueduct in England

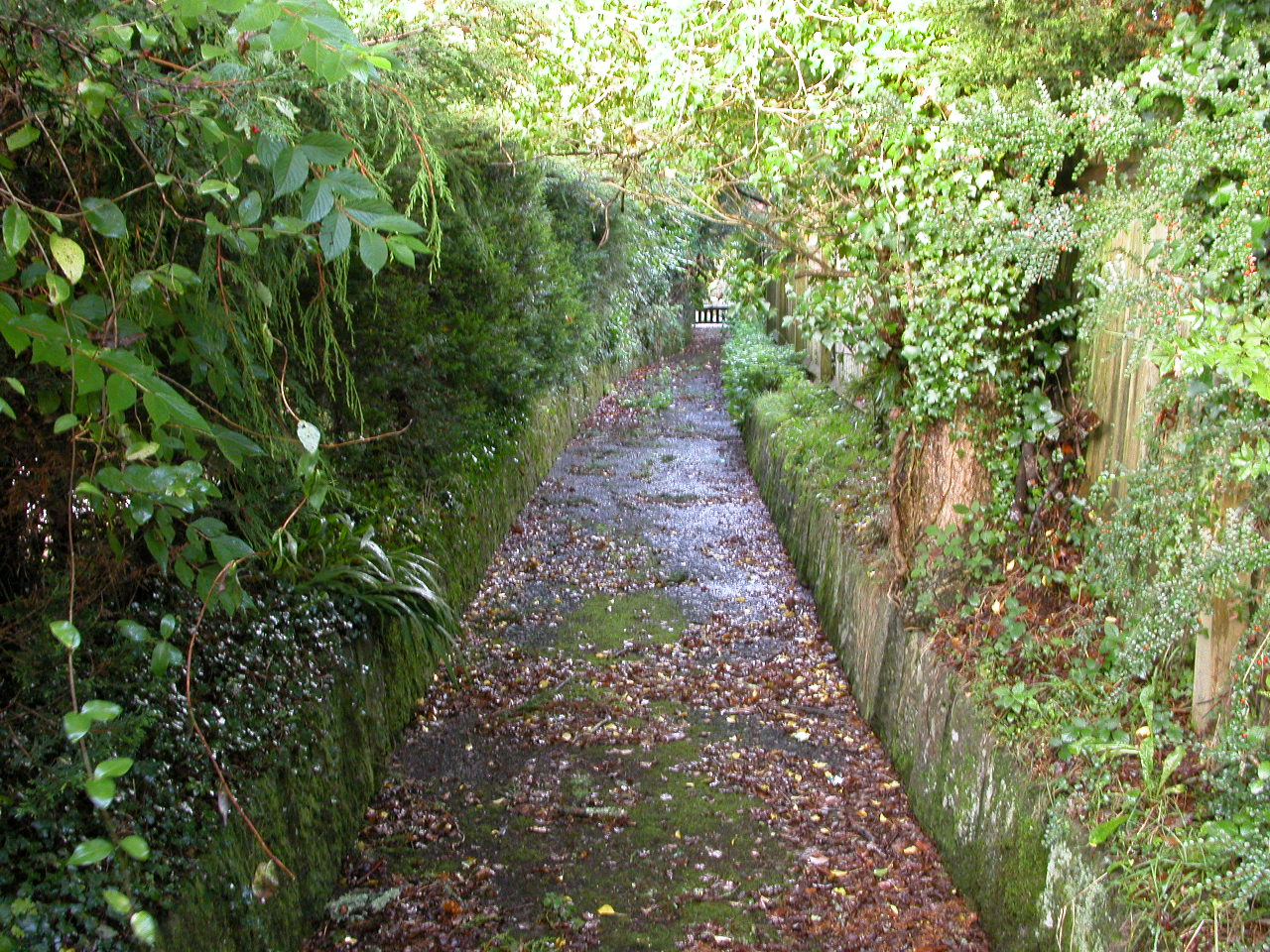
Drake's Leat

Drake's Leat, also known as Plymouth Leat, was a watercourse constructed in the late 16th century to tap the River Meavy on Dartmoor, England, from which it ran 17.5 miles (28.2 km) in order to supply Plymouth with water. It began at a point now under water at Burrator Reservoir, from which its path now emerges some 10m lower than the typical reservoir water level. It was one of the first municipal water supplies in the country.

== Plans ==
The leat was first mooted in 1560 and then Mr Forsland of Bovey was paid 16s 10d (89p) to prepare a feasibility study. Due to the necessity of following the contours the length of the leat was seventeen and a half miles.

In 1576, Walter Peperell became Mayor of Plymouth and it was at this time that the idea for the leat was resurrected by the Corporation of Plymouth. It was then that Robert Lampen of St Budeaux was paid 52s 5d (£2.62) to undertake a survey and the route of the leat was confirmed.

When Elizabeth I called a parliament in 1584, the Water Bill for Plymouth was already prepared for presentation. The bill had the following clauses:

1. To provide a supply of water for naval and merchant shipping.
2. To provide water for fire fighting in Plymouth.
3. To scour Sutton Harbour of silt.
4. To improve the poor quality of land on Dartmoor adjacent to the proposed leat.

The bill was passed to a Select committee chaired by a Mr Wroth and which included Sir Francis Drake, Mr Edgcumbe and Mr Grafton, for consideration. Drake proposed an additional clause stating that mills could be erected and operated on the banks of the leat. It gained royal assent and was passed as an Act in 1585 "For the Preservation of the Haven of Plymouth".

The town was authorized:
"... to digge and myne a Diche or Trenche conteynenge in Bredthe betwene sixe or seaven ffoote over in all Places throughe and over all the Lands and Grounds lyeing betweene the saide Towne of Plymmowth and anye parte of the saide Ryver Mewe als Mevye, and to digge, myne, breake, bancke and caste vpp, all and all maner of Rockes Stones Gravell Sande and all other Letts in anye places or Groundes for the conveyant or necessarie Conveyange of the same River to the saide Towne ..."

== Construction ==
Due to lack of funding caused by the war with Spain and the Armada, construction was not started until 1590 and completed in 1591. The construction of the leat was by means of a simple ditch and bank which measured approximately six feet at its widest and was approximately two feet deep. Its course was deliberately meandering and gently sloping so that the water would not flow too fast and erode the banks. It was estimated that it took some thirty five men just over four months to complete the construction. Drake took part in the ceremonial turning of the first sod in December 1590. On 24 April 1591, the supply of water first flowed to Plymouth and the leat was blessed by the rector of Meavy. A legend records that at its opening Drake rode a white horse ahead of the water all the way to Plymouth.

Drake was paid £200 for the work plus another £100 for compensation to any landowners whose property the course of the leat would have to pass through. In the event he paid out only £100 for construction and £60 for compensation making a tidy £140 profit. The leat powered all six of the new mills built by Plymouth Corporation and leased by Drake, as well as the existing mill, already being leased by Drake.

On completion of the leat it was obvious that little heed had been paid to the original clauses as the leat did not flow to the naval victualling yard at Lambhay until 1645; it was of no use for fire fighting as it avoided the built up areas of the city; it never went near Sutton Harbour, entering the sea at Millbay instead; and finally no arrangements for supplying irrigation were ever made with the taking of water from the leat being made illegal. It can therefore be seen that the primary purpose was to enable Drake to capitalise on his milling operations. Some of the excess water was made available free to the public, via 27 conduits spread around the town, after it had driven the mill wheels but by 1600 only 30 wealthier homes had been directly connected.

== Conflict with the tinners ==
Around 1600 an acrimonious dispute arose over the diversion of water from the leat for use in tin mills on Roborough Down. On one side was Thomas Drake, brother of the deceased Francis, who now owned the corn mills lower down the leat; on the other was Sir Walter Raleigh as Lord Warden of the Stannaries, who supported the tinners' claim under stannary law. The dispute went to the Star Chamber, and the outcome of the proceedings was that in 1603 the tinners were permitted to abstract water for their "two tynne milles knocking mills or classe milles".

== Preservation ==
Harsh winters and a general decline in the condition of the leat brought the feasibility of its continued existence into question. The ever-growing population, and the increasing demand on the water supply in Plymouth, meant that a more reliable source and supply of fresh water had to be found, and this led to the creation of Burrator Reservoir in 1891. So, three hundred years after its construction, the upper part of Drake's Leat was lost as the valley was flooded, although lower sections remained for some years.

Despite many considerations and plans to put the leat to good use, little has been preserved. The leat was briefly restored during the Second World War, should it have been needed if the city's new supply was damaged. Parts of the leat are still visible on the moor at Roborough Down (just off the A386) and near Clearbrook.

In 2025, during a portion of the leat was rediscovered during renovation works to Armada Way. In the same year, volunteers from the Dartmoor Preservation Association began clearing overgrown vegetation that was covering the leat in Roborough Down.

== See also ==
- Devonport Leat
