= Tottiford, Kennick, and Trenchford Reservoirs =

Group of reservoirs in Devon, England

Coordinates: 50.633°N 3.682°W

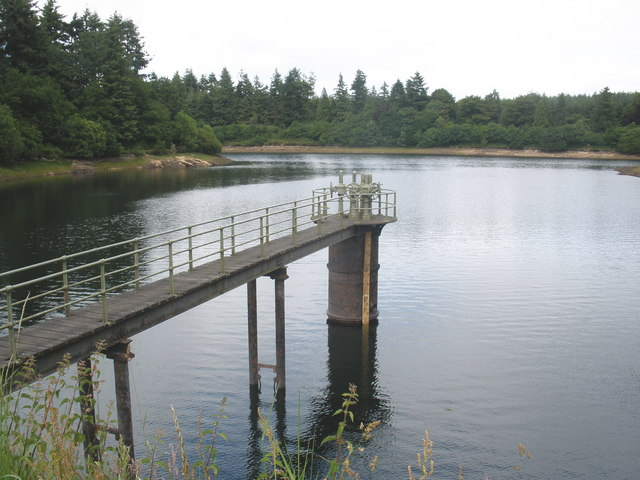
Tottiford Reservoir, the middle and oldest of the three linked reservoirs

The Tottiford, Kennick, and Trenchford Reservoirs are three man-made, connected fresh water reservoirs near Hennock, Devon. They form three of the eight reservoirs built within the Dartmoor National Park, and were built to serve the water needs of Torquay, around 13 miles (21 km) away.

Tottiford was the first to be constructed, being opened in 1861, followed by the higher Kennick in 1884. Trenchford is the lowest elevation of the three, and was completed in 1907. The reservoirs dam the Beadon Brook, with Trenchford also being fed by the Trenchford stream, which then continue after the water works to join the River Teign near Trusham.

== History ==
=== Tottiford ===
The land for Tottiford was purchased from Lord Exmouth in the late 1850s.

Construction was delayed by the objection of Mr JT Harvey, who persistently asserted that the Water Committee did not have the legal standing to purchase the required land.

The tender for construction was issued in August 1860, and by November 1861 the Water Committee were able to inspect the new water works, by which time the reservoir was around 2/3 full. By December 1861 the reservoir was full and overflowing, and the work declared complete.

Tottiford was originally designed to hold 30,000,000 imperial gallons (140,000,000 L) of water, but this was changed during construction to hold 50,000,000 imperial gallons (230,000,000 L). Whilst built to supply Torquay, an agreement was made to supply excess to Newton Abbot (through which the pipe would pass) as available.

=== Addition of Kennick ===
A number of options were considered for expanding the supply of water, including in the Trenchford valley, but this was dropped in favour of the higher site at Kennick.

== Archaeology ==
There is evidence of a pre-historic ceremonial site buried in the ground under the Tottiford reservoir, which has been exposed during particularly low water in the reservoir. This was discovered in 2009 and excavated in 2010 by Time Team.

== Engineering ==
The Tottiford dam is constructed of earthen embankments with core walls of clay puddle.

Between the three reservoirs, they impound 474,000,000 imperial gallons (2.15×10^{9} L) of water.

=== Safety ===
In 2009 the reservoirs were upgraded from a Category B risk, meaning that they could endanger lives but not a community, to a Category A risk, where more than 10 lives would be at stake if they failed.

== Recreation ==
The three reservoirs are managed by the South West Lakes Trust on behalf of South West Water, and are stocked with rainbow trout for fishing.
