= Leat =

Artificial watercourse or aqueduct dug into the ground

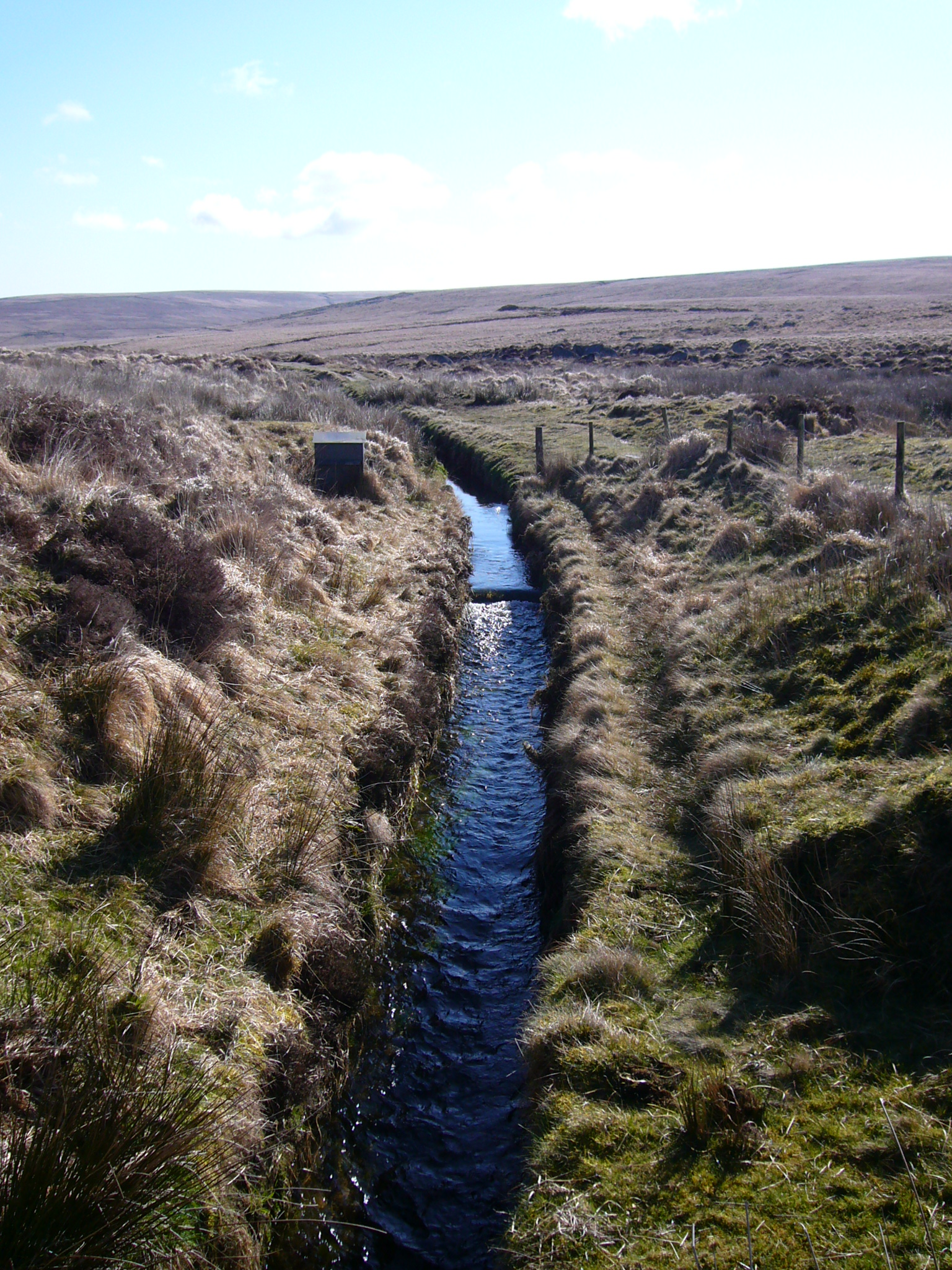
The Devonport Leat near Nun's cross farm

A leat (/ˈliːt/; also lete or leet, or millstream), in the south and west of England and in Wales, is an artificial watercourse or aqueduct dug into the ground, especially one supplying water to a watermill or its mill pond. Other common uses for leats include delivery of water for hydraulic mining and mineral concentration, for irrigation, to serve a dye works or other industrial plant, and provision of drinking water to a farm or household or as a catchment cut-off to improve the yield of a reservoir.

According to the Oxford English Dictionary, leat is cognate with let in the sense of "allow to pass through". Other names for the same thing include fleam (probably a leat supplying water to a mill that did not have a millpool). In parts of northern England, for example around Sheffield, the equivalent word is goit. In southern England, a leat used to supply water for water-meadow irrigation is often called a carrier, top carrier, or main.

== Design and functions ==
=== Water mills ===
Leats generally start some distance (a few hundred metres/yards, or perhaps several miles/kilometres) above the mill or other destination, where an offtake or sluice gate diverts a proportion of the water from a river or stream. A weir in the source stream often serves to provide a reservoir of water adequate for diversion. The leat then runs along the edge or side of the valley, at a shallower slope than the main stream. The gradient, together with the quality of the wetted surface of the leat, determines the flow rate. The flow rate may be calculated using the Manning formula. By the time it arrives at the water mill the difference in levels between the leat and the main stream is great enough to provide a useful head of water – several metres (perhaps 5 to 15 feet) for a watermill, or a metre or less (perhaps one to four feet) for the controlled irrigation of a water-meadow.

=== Water supply ===
Leats are used to increase the yield of a reservoir by trapping streams in nearby catchments by means of a contour leat. This captures part or all of the stream flow and transports it along the contour to the reservoir. Such leats are common around reservoirs in the uplands of Wales.

=== Mining ===
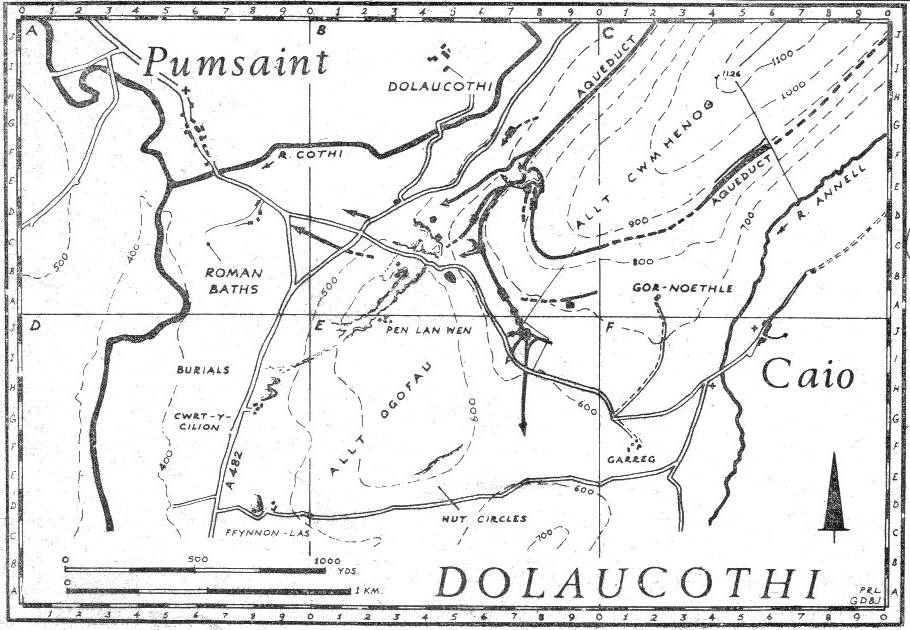
Map of the Roman Dolaucothi Gold Mines

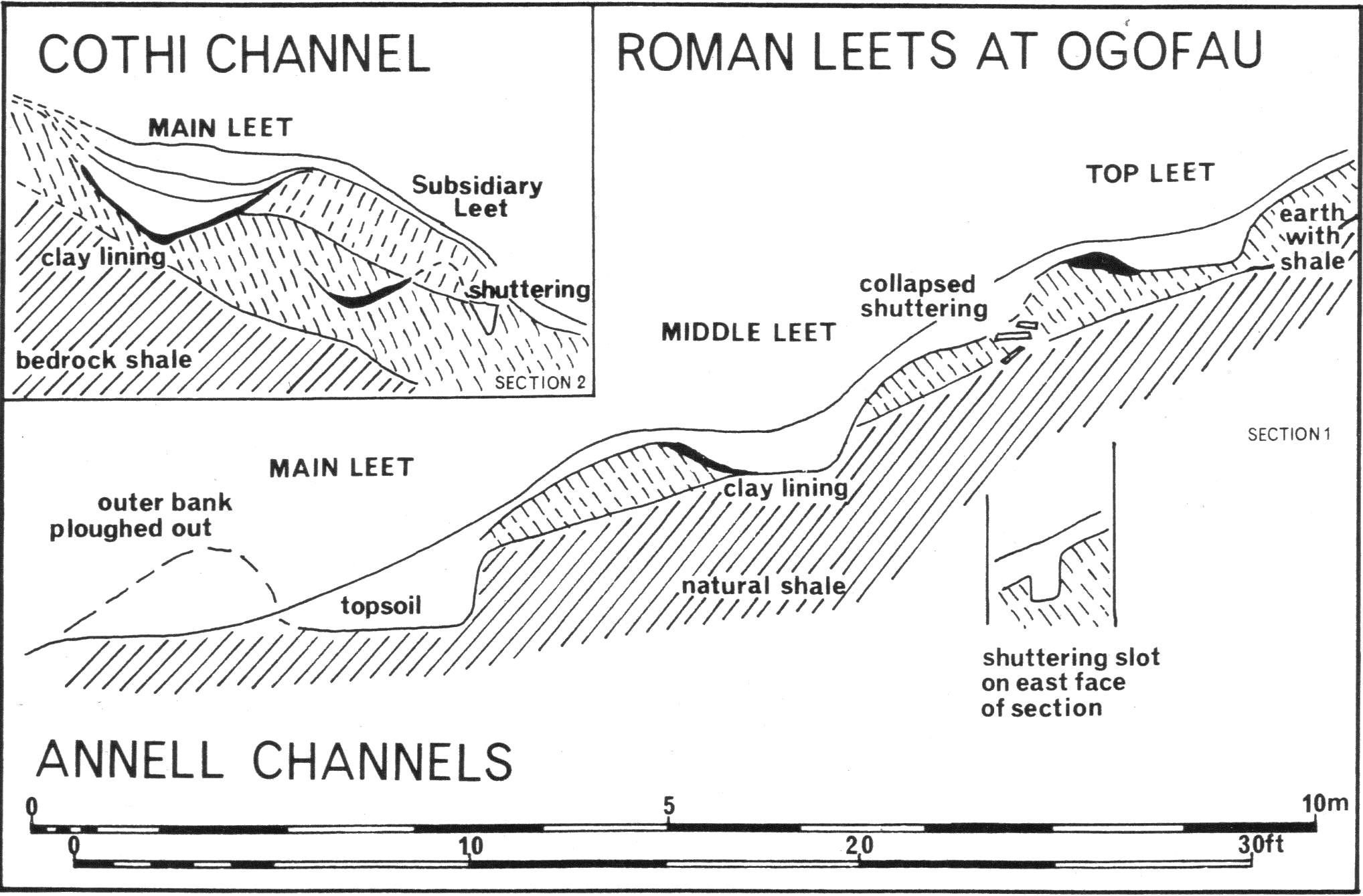
The aqueducts at Dolaucothi

Leats were built to work lead, tin and silver ores in mining areas of Wales, Cornwall, Devon, the Pennines and the Leadhills/Wanlockhead area of Southern Scotland from the 17th century onwards. They were used to supply water for hushing mineral deposits, washing ore and powering mills.

== Use in Roman times ==
Leats were also used extensively by the Romans, and can still be seen at many sites, such as the Dolaucothi Gold Mines. They used the aqueducts to prospect for ores by sluicing away the overburden of soil to reveal the bedrock in a method known as hushing. They could then attack the ore veins by fire-setting, quench with water from a tank above the workings, and remove the debris with waves of water, a method still used in hydraulic mining. The water supply could then be used for washing the ore after crushing by simple machines also driven by water.

The Romans also used them for supplying water to the bath-houses or thermae and to drive vertical water-wheels.

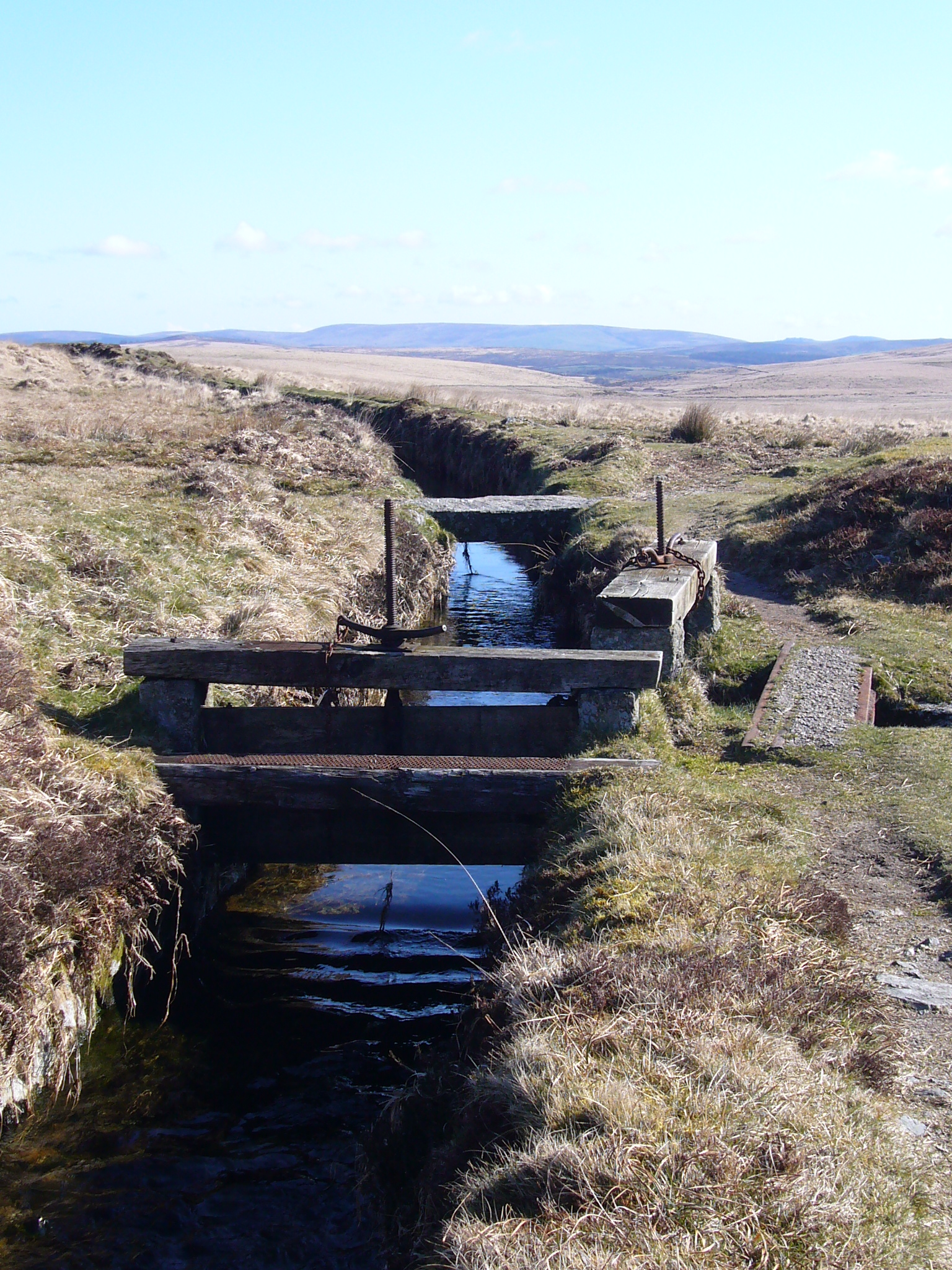
Devonport Leat showing sluice gates

== Dartmoor ==
There are many leats on Dartmoor, mostly constructed to provide power for mining activities, although some were also sources of drinking water. The courses of many Dartmoor leats may still be followed. Many such leats on the moor are marked on the 1:50000 and 1:25000 Ordnance Survey maps, such as that serving the now-defunct Vitifer mine near the Warren House Inn. Notable leats include:

- Drake's Leat, constructed in 1591 under the management of Sir Francis Drake, as an agent of the Corporation of Plymouth, to carry water from Dartmoor to Plymouth.
- Devonport Leat constructed in the late 18th century to carry water to the expanding naval dockyard at Devonport (now a part of Plymouth).

== See also ==
- Acequia
- Flume
- Kunstgraben
- Mill race
- Penstock
- Roman aqueduct
- Roman engineering
- Roman mining
