= River Meavy =

River in Devon, England

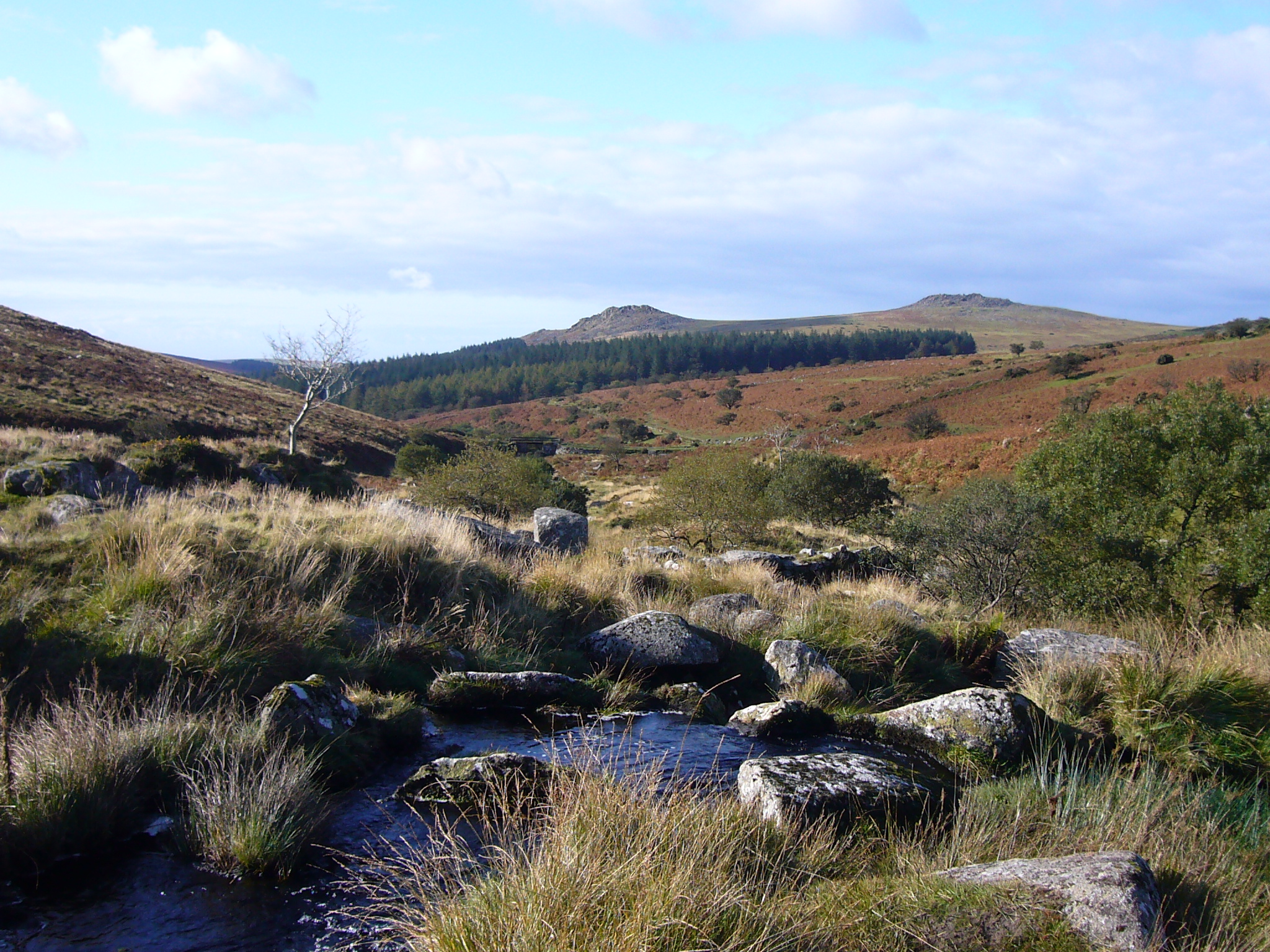
- View down the River Meavy towards Sharpitor and Leather Tor

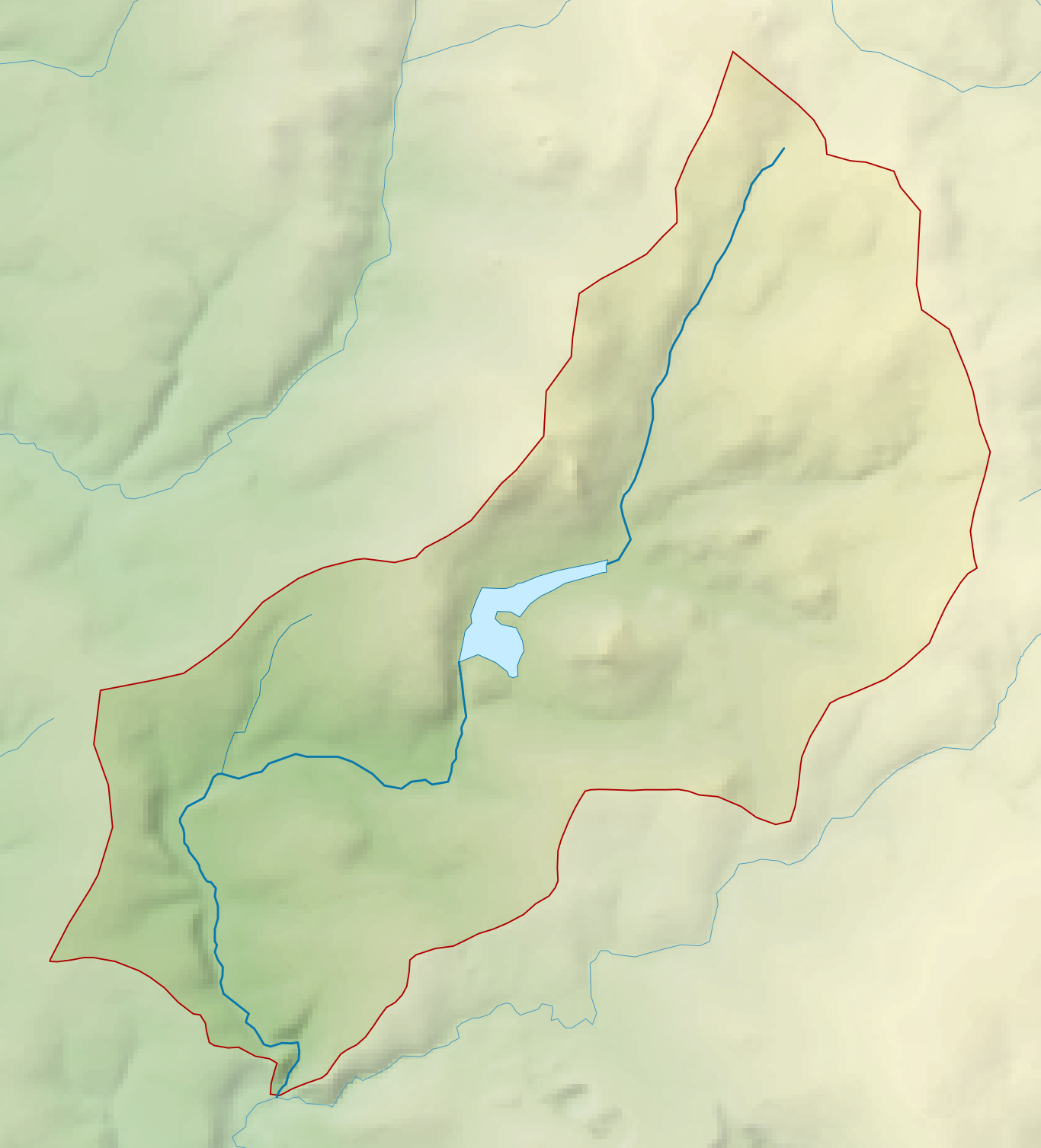
- Catchment and course of the River Meavy

- Location within Devon

Location
- Country: England
- Counties: Devon

Physical characteristics
- Source: Meavy Head
- Mouth: River Plym
  - location: Devon
  - coordinates: 50.4546°N 4.0681°W
- Length: 15.9 km (9.9 mi)
- Basin size: 42.2 km^{2} (16.3 sq mi)

The River Meavy is a river in the southwest part of Dartmoor in Devon in south-west England. It runs entirely in the national park and connects Burrator Reservoir to the River Plym.

== Course ==
The river is 15.9 kilometres (9.9 mi) long, and flows in a generally south-westerly direction throughout its course. It rises at Meavy Head, close to Princetown, and flows across Walkhampton Common, through Norsworthy and adjacent plantations, and into Burrator Reservoir. It leaves the reservoir at the main dam, and flows past the village of Meavy before joining the River Plym at the upper end of Bickleigh Vale. The entirety of the river is inside Dartmoor National Park.

Most of the valley surrounding the river's southern section is wooded, and has been described as a semi-neutral ancient woodland. The north section, beyond Burrator Reservoir, is less covered as it is towards the centre of Dartmoor and features several rock tors near the river.

== History ==
The river is believed to named after an Old English word, meaning "lively stream". The village of Meavy is in turn named after the river.

Drake's Leat was a watercourse constructed in the 16th century to transport drinking water from the River Meavy towards Plymouth. Burrator Lodge was built in 1896 for the reservoir owner. It is now a Grade II listed building. In 2015, the property was put on the market.

== Leisure ==
The river is popular for canoeing south of Burrator Reservoir, and is considered an easier course than the upper sections of the River Plym, which are some of the most challenging in Dartmoor. Despite the presence of the dam at Burrator, there is generally a sufficient flow of water.
