= North Hessary Tor =

Hill in Devon, England

Coordinates: 50°33′1″N 4°0′30″W

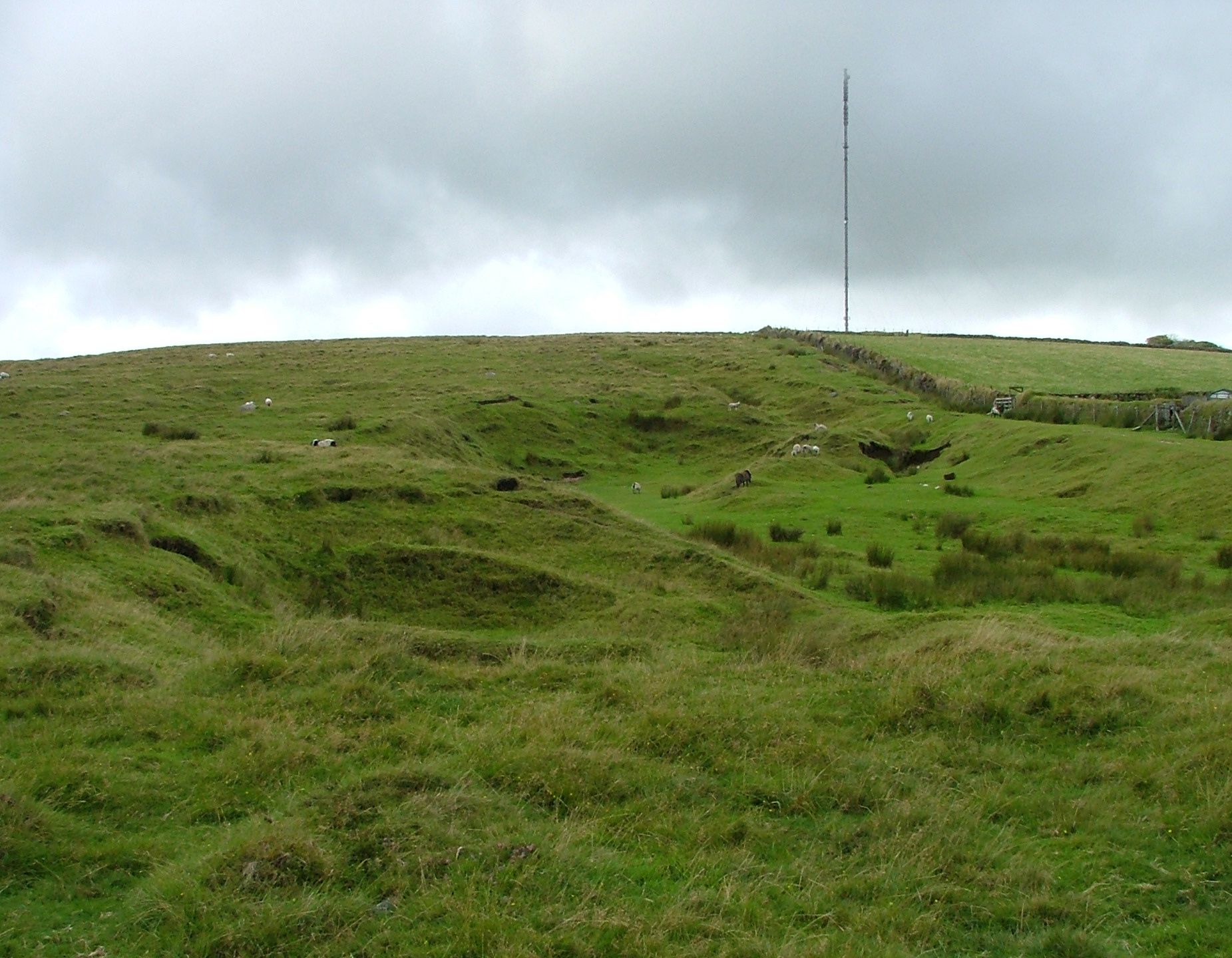
North Hessary Tor with radio mast

North Hessary Tor is a 517 metres hill just above Dartmoor Prison, in Princetown within Dartmoor Forest civil parish, which is in the borough of West Devon, Devon, England (grid reference SX578742). The tor is one of the boundary points mentioned in the perambulations of the Forest of Dartmoor.

Standing on the summit is the North Hessary Tor transmitting station, an FM radio and television transmitter which uses a 196 metres (643 ft) high guyed mast. It was built by the BBC in 1955 when a transmitter was needed to introduce 405-line television into Devon. It now carries a small UHF TV transmitter which serves Princetown and Dartmoor. FM radio transmissions began in 1956 and cover most of Devon and eastern parts of Cornwall.
