= Burrator Reservoir =

Reservoir in Devon, England

Coordinates: 50°29′56.57″N 4°2′25.64″W

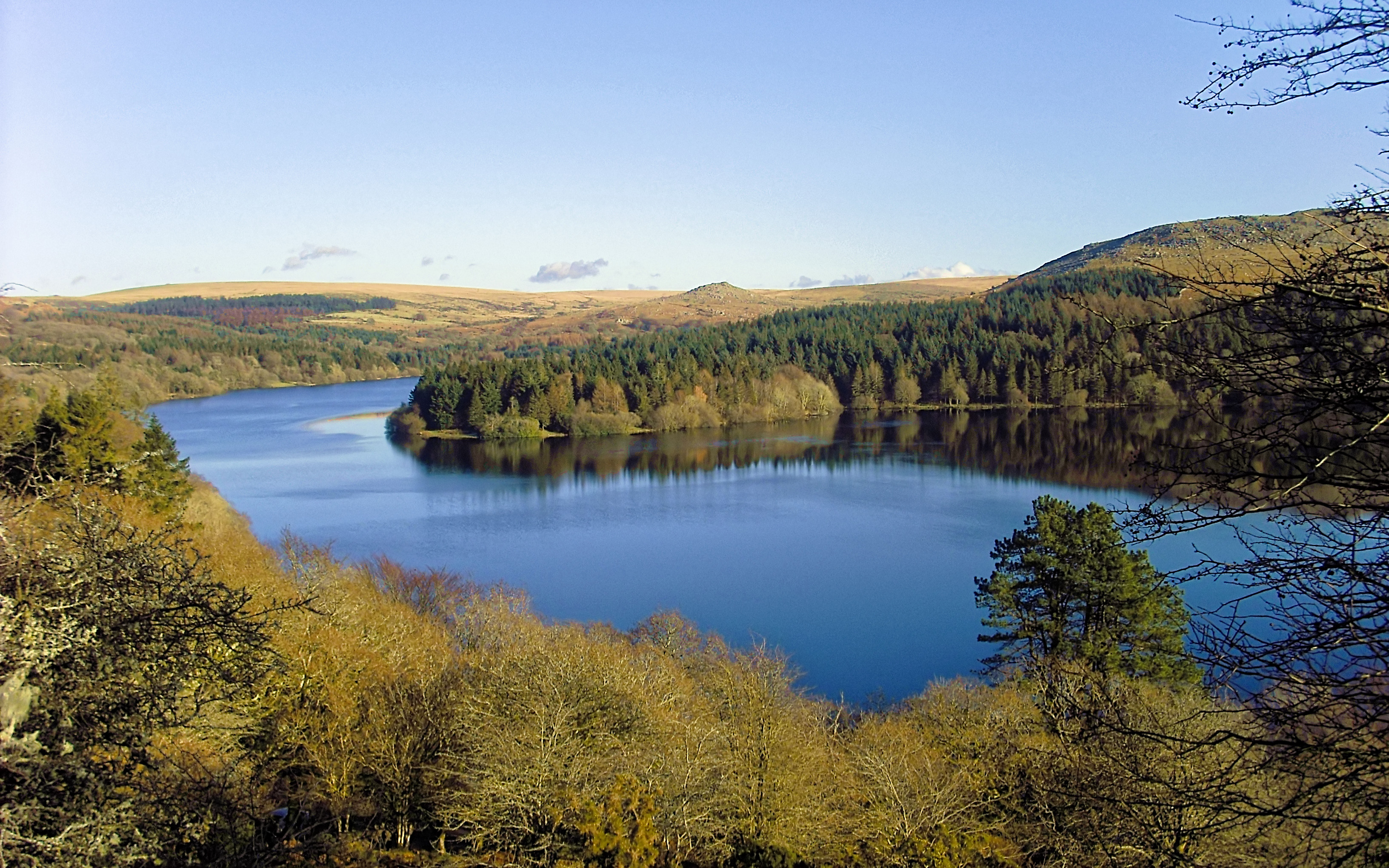
- Interactive map of Burrator Reservoir
- Location: Dartmoor, Devon, England
- Type: Reservoir
- Primary inflows: River Meavy, Sheepstor Brook
- Basin countries: England
- Surface area: 150 acres (61 ha)

Burrator Reservoir is a reservoir situated on the southern side of Dartmoor in Devon, England. It is part of a number of reservoirs and dams that were built over the course of the 19th and 20th centuries in the area now covered by Dartmoor National Park to supply drinking water to the city of Plymouth and other rapidly growing towns in the surrounding lowlands.

Burrator Reservoir was completed in 1898 and later expanded in 1929. The reservoir was built under the supervision of Edward Sandeman (1862-1959), the Water Engineer for Plymouth. The reservoir has two dams, the Burrator Dam, which is built across the River Meavy at Burrator Gorge at the south-western end, and the Sheepstor Dam built on a dividing ridge between the Meavy and Sheepstor Brook at the south-eastern end. The Burrator Dam was the first of the two to be built, with construction starting on 9 August 1893. It is the more massive of the two dams, constructed of concrete faced with granite blocks. The Sheepstor Dam was built in 1894 and is an earth embankment with a core wall of puddled clay above the original ground level, with a concrete section below ground. The reservoir was officially opened on 21 September 1898.

In 1923 plans were made to enlarge the reservoir's capacity from 668 million gallons to 1,026 million by raising the height of both dams by 10 feet. Work began in December 1923, including the construction of a temporary suspension bridge near Burrator Dam to maintain traffic flow during the project. The reservoir was officially re-opened on 12 September 1928.

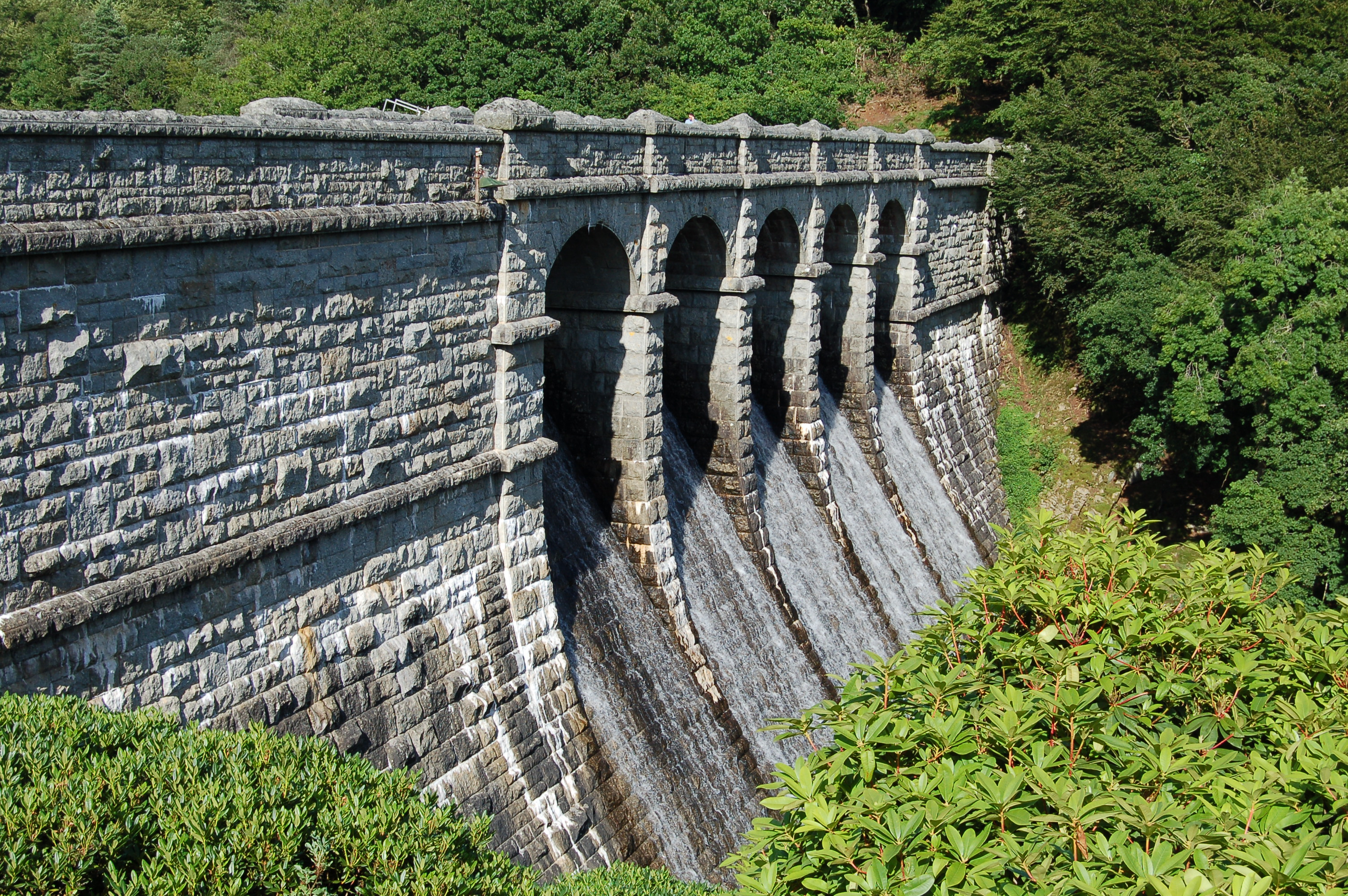
Burrator Dam

By the 1930s the watershed on Dartmoor for the reservoir was stated to be 5,360 acres. The present-day area of the reservoir at overflow level is about 150 acres. The reservoir's edges are planted with commercial forests.

Today, Burrator Reservoir is managed by the South West Lakes Trust and serves as a popular destination for leisure activities such as walking, cycling, and fishing.

== The reservoir in popular culture ==
The reservoir featured in the first episode of the second series of James May's Man Lab, broadcast on BBC Two in October 2011, when Oz Clarke and James May travelled along the reservoir's edge while attempting to stage an escape from Dartmoor Prison to the village of Meavy.

The reservoir also features in Steven Spielberg's 2011 film, War Horse.
