= Wethers =

Wethers is a surname. Notable people with the surname include:

- Brian Wethers (born 1980), American basketball player
- Doris L. Wethers (1927–2019), American pediatrician
- Matthew James Wethers (born 1985), Australian motorcycle speedway rider

== See also ==
- Grey Wethers, two neolithic sites in England
- Wether (disambiguation)
