= Wether (disambiguation) =

Wether is a castrated male sheep or goat.

Wether may also refer to:

- Wether Down, a hill in Hampshire
- Wether Hill (Lake District), a hill in Cumbria
- Wether Holm (disambiguation)

== See also ==
- Wethers, a surname
- Bellwether (disambiguation)
- Whether
- Weather (disambiguation)
