= Blowing house =

Tin smelting building formerly used in southwest England

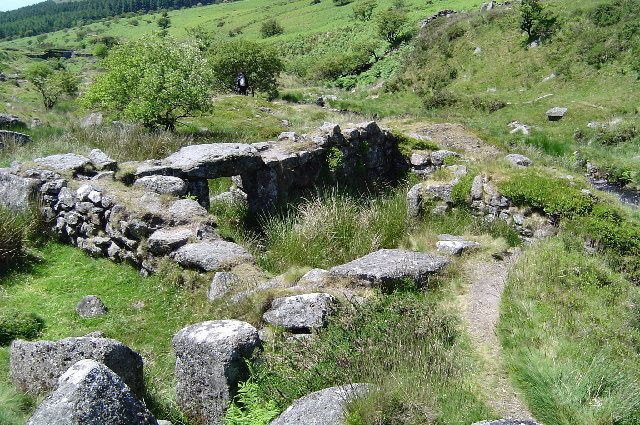
The remains of a blowing house near Black Tor on Dartmoor.

A blowing house or blowing mill was a building used for smelting tin in Cornwall and on Dartmoor in Devon, in South West England. Blowing houses contained a furnace and a pair of bellows that were powered by an adjacent water wheel, and they were in use from the early 14th century until they were gradually replaced by reverberatory furnaces in the 18th century. The remains of over 40 blowing houses have been identified on Dartmoor.

== History ==
The blowing house method of smelting tin was probably introduced early in the 14th century to replace the earliest method of smelting which had to be done in two stages – a first smelting probably took place near to the tinworks and the roughly smelted metal was taken to a stannary town to be smelted again to produce the final refined product. Each of these smeltings was taxed separately until 1303 when they were replaced by a single tax on the finished product. It is likely that this tax change was due to the improved smelting process provided by the blowing houses.

totum illud molendinium ibidem vocatum a blowyng myll & knakkyng myll

— Extract from a 1514 lease of land at Dartmeet
(held by the Devon Record Office).

Documentation confirms the existence of blowing houses in Cornwall as early as 1402, but the earliest reference for Dartmoor is not found until the early 16th century, though it is likely that they were in use on the moor earlier. In Devon there are many references to blowing mills throughout the 16th and 17th centuries, reflecting the boom time in tin-mining on Dartmoor. However, by 1730 there were only two blowing mills working in the whole of the county: at Sheepstor and Plympton.

From the beginning of the 18th century, this method was gradually superseded by reverberatory furnace smelting, which used higher temperatures and powdered anthracite as fuel and had the advantage of not requiring a forced draught of air. The smelting house at Eylesbarrow tin mine which was in operation during the first half of the 19th century had two furnaces, one of each type.

== Construction ==
On Dartmoor, blowing houses were rectangular buildings between around 16 to 32 feet (4.9 to 9.8 m) in length and around half this in width. They were made of unmortared granite blocks with walls often 2 feet 6 inches (0.76 m) or more thick and probably had turf or thatch roofs which were periodically burnt to retrieve the particles of tin that would have been driven into the roof through the blast from the bellows. Blowing houses are typically located on or near the bank of a stream where the fall of water was enough for a leat to be built to work a small (9 ft or 2.7 m) diameter overshot water wheel which developed around 0.66 hp (0.5 kW) to operate the bellows.

The only contemporary detailed description of a blowing house was provided by a Cornishman named William Pryce in his treatise on Cornish mining of 1778:

The fire-place, or castle, is about six feet perpendicular, two feet wide in the top part each way, and about fourteen inches in the bottom, all made of moorstone and clay, well cemented and clamped together. The pipe or nose of each bellows is fixed ten inches (250 mm) high from the bottom of the castle, in a large piece of wrought iron, called the Hearth-eye. The tin and charcoal are laid in the castle, stratum super stratum, in such quantities as are thought proper; so that from eight to twelve hundred weight of Tin, by the consumption of eighteen to twenty-four sixty gallon packs of charcoal, may be smelted in a tide or twelve hours time.

According to Crispin Gill, about two tons of charcoal was needed to smelt a ton of metal. The molten metal ran out from the bottom of the furnace into a granite trough or "float" from where it was ladled into stone moulds.

== Archaeology ==
Archaeological investigation of blowing houses started in 1866 when John Kelly examined the lower mill at Yealm Steps. Robert Burnard cleared the interior of the lower mill at Week Ford in the 1880s, but the most notable researcher of the remains on Dartmoor was R. Hansford Worth who made detailed records of over 40 sites. Since then, research on the tin industry in the south west has continued, for instance The Dartmoor Tinworking Interest Group was formed in 1991.

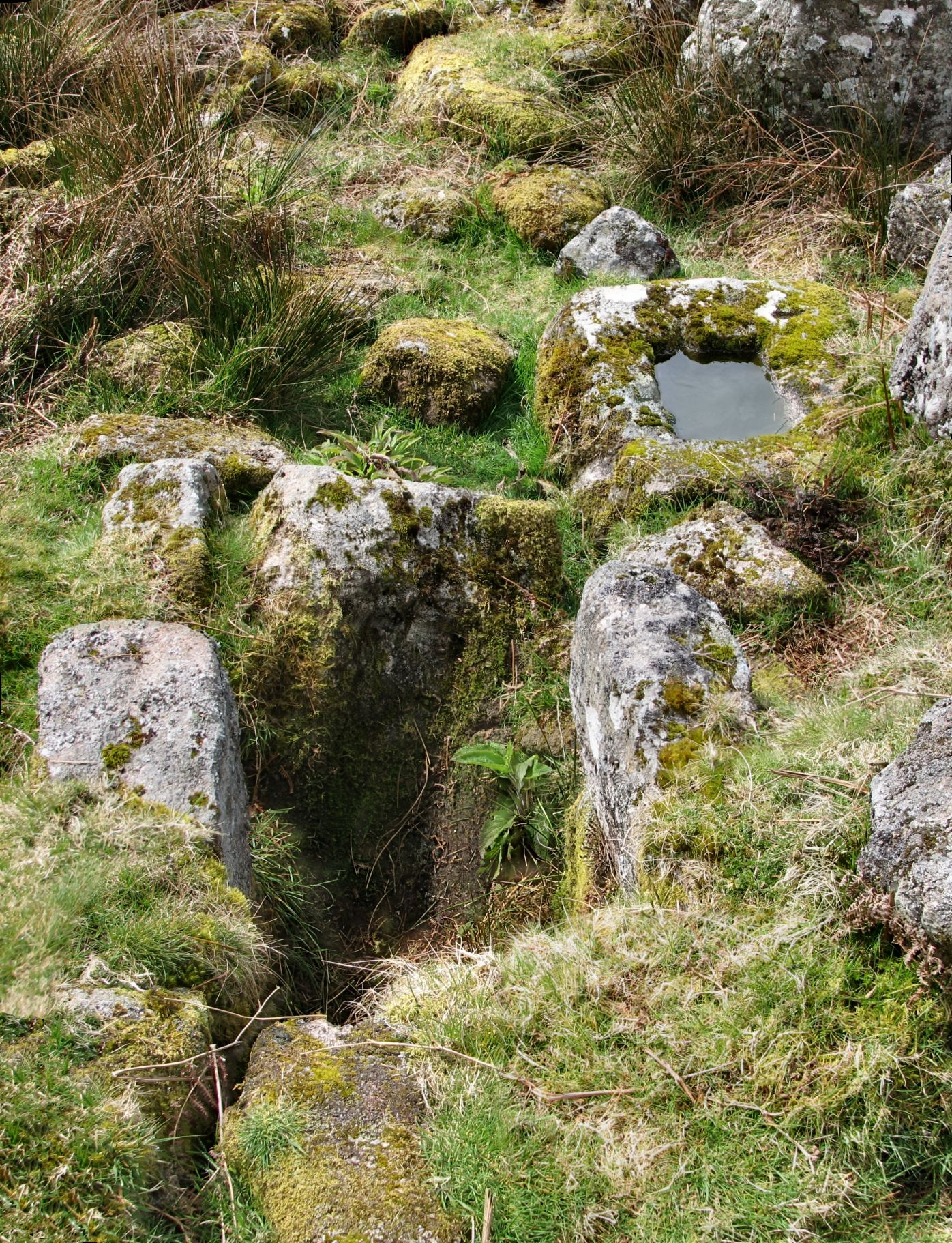
The furnace area of the Lower Merrivale blowing house (see text)

There is evidence for furnaces that match the description given by Pryce (see above) at Upper and Lower Merrivale, Avon Dam and Blacksmith's Shop. Each of these sites has two upright granite slabs about 2 to 3 feet (0.61 to 0.91 m) apart set into the floor area of the mill, leaving space behind for the bellows. The Merrivale sites also have a slab at the back, making a basic hearth shape. The accompanying photograph shows the two side slabs of the furnace at the Lower Merrivale blowing house, with the somewhat displaced float stone between them. The mouldstone, filled with rainwater, is just above and to the right.

The mouldstone is the best field evidence for a blowing house; they are large blocks of granite with a flat top containing a rectangular hollow recess into which the molten tin was poured to be cast into ingots. The moulds vary in size and shape, the largest known from Dartmoor being that from Upper Merrivale at 280 by 390 millimetres (11 in × 15 in), and the smallest 180 millimetres (7.1 in) square at Longstone. Some mouldstones have additional smaller hollows on their surface; these are traditionally assumed to be for assaying purposes, but some authors have suggested that they may have been for making small ingots for selling illicitly to avoid tin coinage, the tax on white, or refined tin.

The only properly documented find of a tin ingot from Dartmoor has a diagonal hole through it which matches the supposed practice of placing a stick in the mould when pouring in the molten tin. The stick would burn away leaving the hole which would be used to lever out the solid ingot from the mould and would later be useful to tie up the ingots for carriage. According to Worth, the found ingot fitted precisely into one of the moulds found at the lower blowing house on the River Yealm, although it did not fill it and weighed only 52 pounds (24 kg), far less than the average Dartmoor ingot weight of 195 pounds (88 kg). He speculated that it was the small surplus that remained after the normal ingots had been cast. Cornish ingots were much larger, averaging around 345 pounds (156 kg).

One of the best preserved blowing houses on Dartmoor is above Merrivale Bridge on the River Walkham. It has a mould stone close to its entrance and the wheel-pit can be easily traced. Some blowing houses also housed crushing ("knacking") or grinding ("crazing") mills, and at Gobbet Mine on the River Swincombe both the upper and lower grinding stones were found.

== See also ==
- Dartmoor tin-mining
- Blowing engine
