= Weather (disambiguation) =

Weather is the varied phenomena that can occur in the atmosphere of a planet.

Weather may also refer to:

== Weather forecasting and reporting ==
- Weather (Apple), a preinstalled weather forecasting app on iPhones
- MSN Weather, a weather service from Microsoft
- The Weather Channel, an all-weather network owned by Entertainment Studios

== Music ==
- Weather (Meshell Ndegeocello album), 2011
- Weather (Tycho album), 2019
- Weather (Huey Lewis and the News album), 2020
- Weathers (band)
- The Weather (Busdriver & Radioinactive album), a 2003 hip hop album with Daedelus
- The Weather (Pond album), 2017
- "The Weather", a song by Built to Spill from their 2001 album Ancient Melodies of the Future
- "The Weather", a song by All Time Low from their 2025 album Everyone's Talking!

== Literature ==
- Weather (novel), by Jenny Offill
- "Weather", a short story by Alastair Reynolds in his collection Galactic North, set in his Revelation Space universe

== Other uses ==
- Weathers (band)
- Weathers (surname)

== See also ==
- Wether (disambiguation)
- Whether
