= Weathers (surname) =

Weathers is a surname, and may refer to:

- Andre Weathers (born 1976), football player
- Barbara Weathers (born 1963), R&B/soul singer
- Beck Weathers (born 1946), pathologist
- Brenda Weathers (1936–2005), American activist and writer
- Carl Weathers (1948–2024), American actor and football player
- Casey Weathers (born 1985), American baseball pitcher
- Clarence Weathers (born 1962), American football player
- David Weathers (born 1969), American baseball relief pitcher
- Doug Weathers (born 1931), American television journalist
- Felicia Weathers (born 1937), American opera soprano
- Gale Weathers, a fictional character of the Scream film series
- John Weathers (born 1947), Welsh drummer
- Lawrence Carthage Weathers (1890–1918), Australian recipient of the Victoria Cross
- Michael Weathers (born 1997), American basketball player
- Ryan Weathers (born 1999), American baseball player
- William Weathers (1814–1895), English bishop

Fictional Characters

- Strip Weathers, also known as 'The King' from Cars franchise

== See also ==
- Weather (disambiguation)
- 29198 Weathers, Main-belt Asteroid
- Weathers (band), American Rock band
