= Eylesbarrow mine =

Disused tin mine on Dartmoor, Devon, England

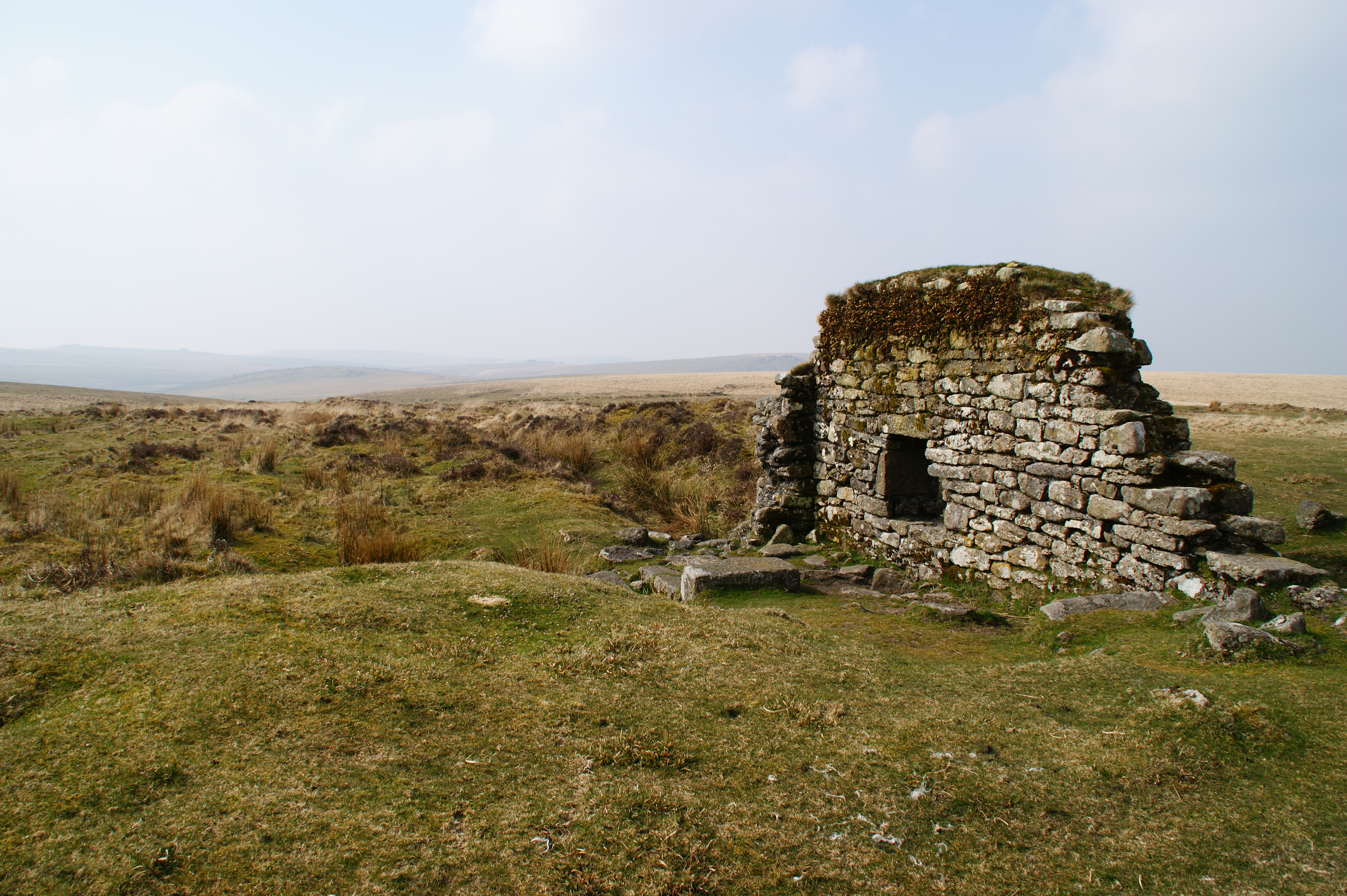
- The side wall of stamping mill No. 2

- Location in Devon
- Location: Dartmoor, Devon, England; 50°29′48″N 3°58′41″W
- Products: Black tin, kaolin (minor)
- Opened: 1804
- Closed: 1852
- Company: Various, see text

Eylesbarrow mine was a tin mine on Dartmoor, Devon, England that was active during the first half of the 19th century. In its early years it was one of the largest and most prosperous of the Dartmoor tin mines, along with Whiteworks and the Birch Tor and Vitifer mines. Its name has several variant spellings, such as Eylesburrow, Ailsborough, Ellisborough, Hillsborough etc. It was also known as Wheal Ruth for a short period around 1850. The extensive remains lie to the north of the River Plym, less than 1 mile (1.6 km) north-east of Drizzlecombe, on the southern shoulder of the hill called Eylesbarrow on top of which are two prominent Bronze Age barrows.

== Geology ==
The country rock of the mine is granite. The large mining sett (about 3 by 2 miles (4.8 by 3.2 km)) is crossed by many tin-bearing lodes which are substantially vertical and trend east-north-east. Most of the mine's excavations were made into just three of these lodes and were relatively shallow. The formation of the lodes was accompanied by extensive metasomatism which converted much of the plagioclase feldspar in the surrounding granite into the soft mineral kaolinite, and made excavation easier than it would have been in unaltered rock.

The lodes varied in width up to a maximum of around 2.4 ft (0.73 m) and were, at least in the early years of the mine's operation, sometimes of very high quality ore, (Note: The best tin ore was called "grain" or "grained" tin, which meant that distinct crystals of cassiterite were visible. Its purity commanded a premium price.) uncontaminated with other unwanted metalliferous ores. The existence of these high quality ores near the surface led the miners to believe that even better ore existed deeper down, but the history of the mine suggests that this is not the case and the mineralisation becomes patchy at depth.

== History ==
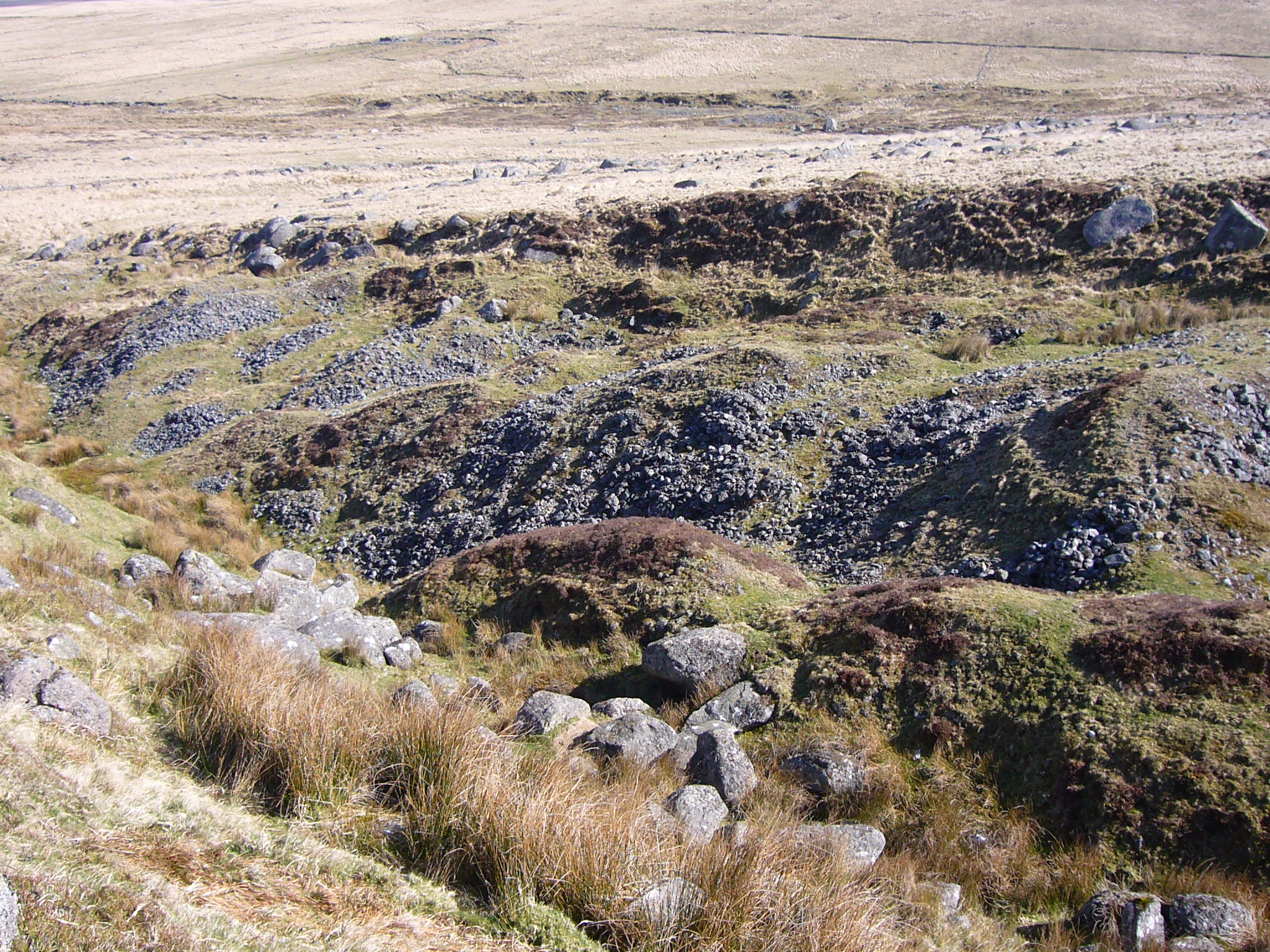
Typical signs of tin-streaming on Dartmoor

Streaming and open-cast mining for tin have taken place in this part of Dartmoor for many centuries. It is believed that the industry on the moor was at its peak as early as the 12th century. For instance, in 1168, men from the nearby village of Sheepstor are known to have been "tinners". Around 550 years later a document of 1715 stated of Sheepstor Parish that "all the parishioners are tinners", but by this time working for tin on the moor was already in decline, probably because of the exhaustion of the easily accessible deposits.

Revival came in the late 1780s, fired by the needs and innovations of the industrial revolution. It is possible that some underground working took place on the site of the mine as early as 1790, but the first documentary evidence is an offer for sale of shares in a mine called "Ailsborough" in 1804, and records of tin dues paid from 1806 to 1810.

By 1814 demand had caused the price of tin to rise to about £150 per ton and in that year a mining sett called "Ellisborough Tin Set" was granted. Extraction started at the mine in February 1815 and by 1820, despite several business difficulties, it was sending quantities of black tin to Cornwall for smelting. In 1822 the mine opened its own smelting house on the site—the only one in operation on the moor. There is evidence that black tin was bought from nearby mines for smelting here.

The next ten years or so were the mine's most productive period, despite there being a fall in the price of tin from 1826. In addition to tin, some "Forest Clay" (kaolin) (Note: Kaolin is formed from the alteration of granite—the large china clay workings at Lee Moor are around three miles to the south.) was sold. In 1831 the mine employed over sixty men, but at the end of that year the smelter ceased operation and there is then a four-year gap in the records.

=== Decline ===
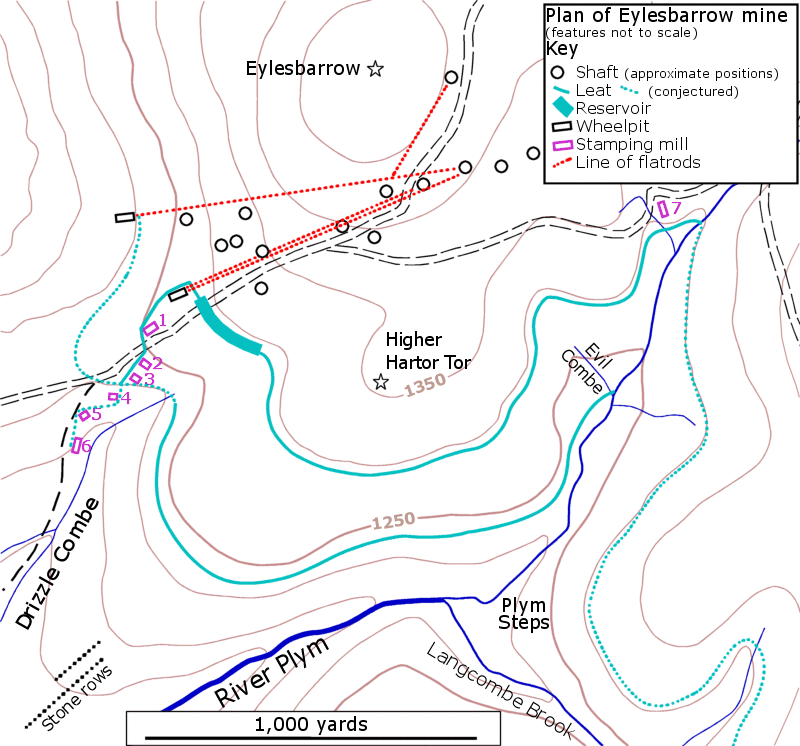
A plan of the mine, see text for details

In June 1836, when the price of tin was again at a high, a prospectus for "Dartmoor Consolidated Tin Mines" was published in the recently founded trade magazine The Mining Journal, offering 7,500 shares at £5 each. The mine apparently operated unsuccessfully on a small scale for the next few years while the price of tin fell again. In August 1838 the shares on which £3. 10s had been paid were worth only £2. By early 1840 the shares, by then fully paid-up were worth just £1. By 1841 only three or four men were employed and in 1844, with the price of tin at an all-time low of just over £60 per ton, the mine closed.

In early 1847, with tin back up to around £90 per ton, the mine was again advertised (this time as "Dartmoor Consols Tin Mining Company"), offering 2,048 shares at £2 each. This resurgence of activity was bolstered with glowing reports on the quality of its ore and the previous high returns that had been made despite the shafts being of no great depth. It was also said that the smelting house "can be made fit for use at a very trifling cost" which will make it "a source of great profit".

In June 1847 the mine captain, John Spargo, proposed a number of improvements, including the installation of a 50 ft (15 m) waterwheel and new stamps, and the sinking of new shafts, the whole costing a total of nearly £1,000. Much of this work was undertaken, but by October the same year, the first signs that all was not well appeared in The Mining Journal. The shares had not been well taken up (Note: In fact it was reported in April 1847 that only 636 of the 2,048 shares offered had been bought and there were outstanding debts of about £650.) and the lack of money was causing problems. By the following March it was reported that the mine could not continue in operation and a final call of £1 per share was being made to clear the debts of the company. It was clear that no tin had been sold.

Valuable Mining Materials for Sale—Ailesborough Mine …
An excellent water-wheel (built in 1848, and now in very good condition) 50 feet in diameter, 3 ft breast, with cranks, sadles, brasses, &c., complete, three balance bobs, with arch heads and pin chain complete …

— Extract from an advertisement in The Mining Journal, 25 September 1852

Yet another company, calling itself "Aylesborough", was formed during 1848, and sold over £50 worth of black tin. In 1849 Captain Spargo reported that the stamps were working well and a shaft had been deepened to 20 fathoms below adit. But problems reappeared and in 1851 it was advertised—for the last time—as "Wheal Ruth" with 2,700 shares offered at £2 each. This new concern employed only a few men, but operated successfully for a time, selling 1 ton 4 cwt 11 lb of ore for £61. 9s in September 1851 and over two tons for more than £107 in the last quarter of the year. However, on 25 September 1852 The Mining Journal ran an advert for the sale of all the mine's equipment by public auction. Since the price of tin was rising again at this time, it is most likely that the mine had become exhausted of tin that was recoverable economically.

== Documentation ==
Although it was once a large and important mine, there are no known plans of its extensive underground workings, and there are few extant records of its output of tin ore. What is known, however, is that a total of about 276 tons of white tin was "coined" (i.e. recorded and taxed) at Tavistock, the nearest stannary town, between the years 1822 and 1831, and this may have been worth almost £30,000. The mine's most productive year was 1825, when 403 blocks of tin weighing over 1,220 cwt in total were coined.

== Field remains ==
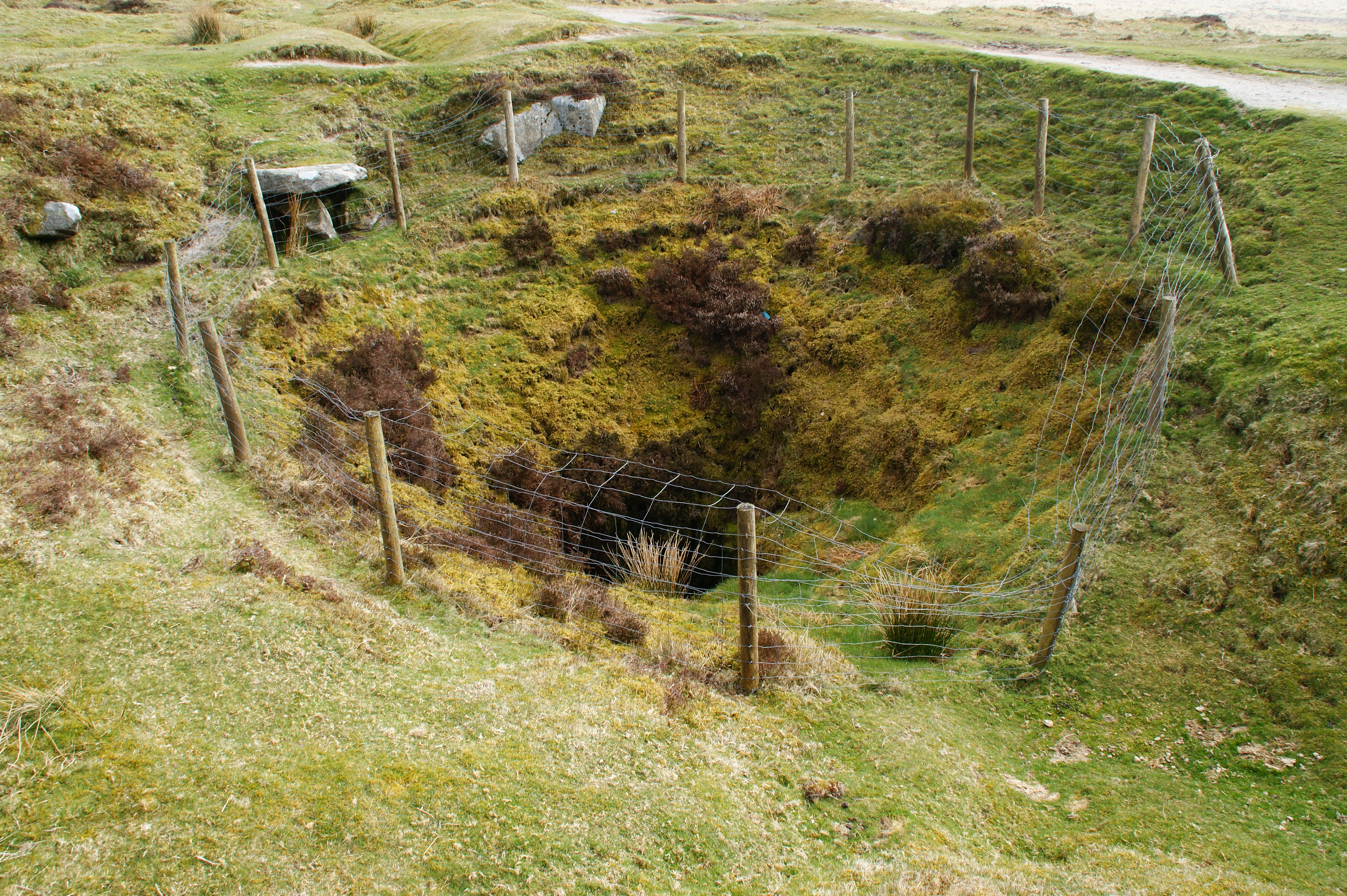
New Engine Shaft...

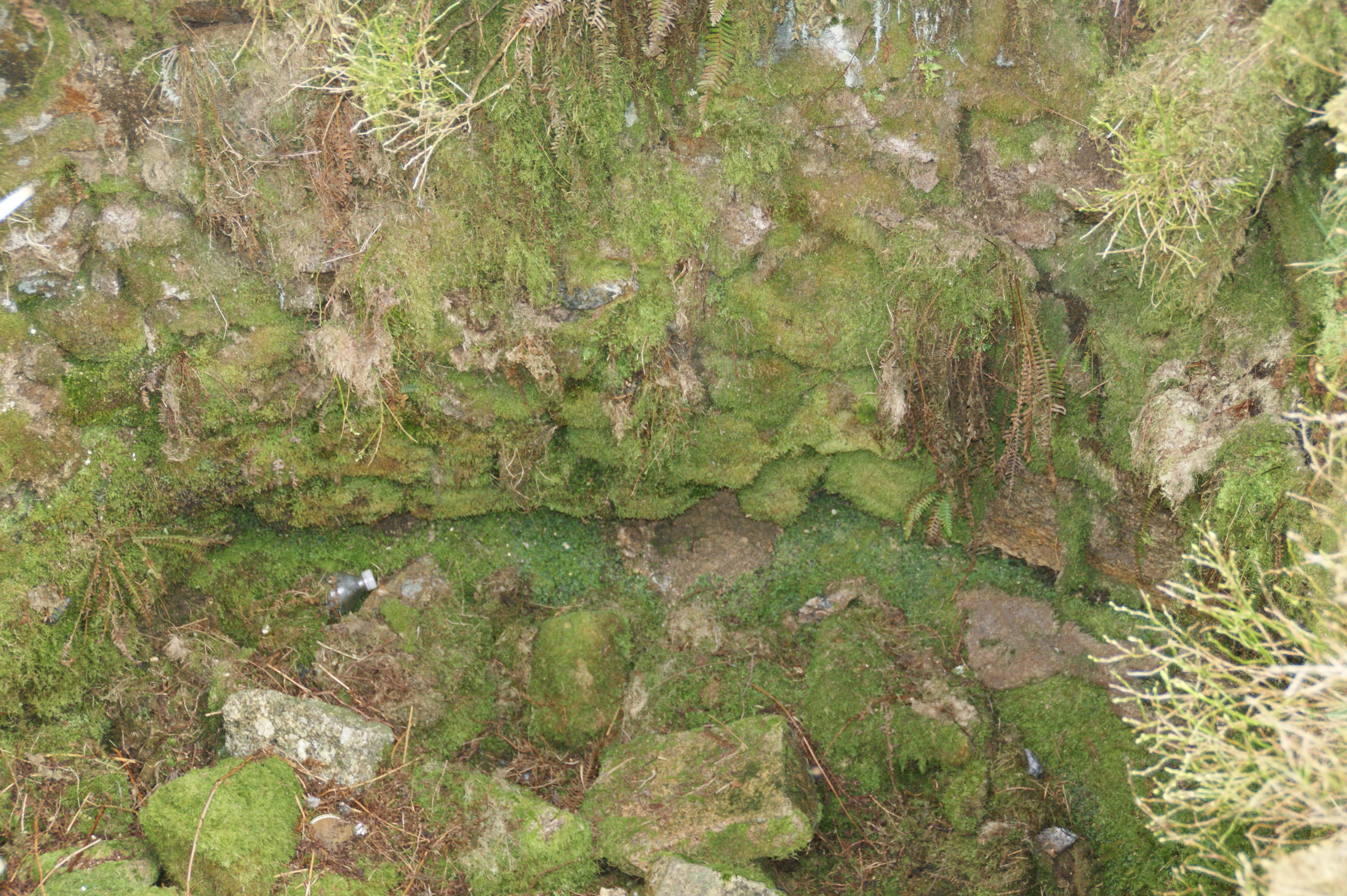
...and its masonry collar

The large site was extensively surveyed (Note: Mostly at a scale of 1:2500, but with the important features surveyed at 1:500.) by English Heritage in 1999, and details are held in the English Heritage Archive.

In common with most Dartmoor valleys, the entire valley floor of the upper River Plym and its tributaries are disturbed by the remains of streamworks. There are also a number of openworks that follow the lodes, and signs of leats and reservoirs and hundreds of prospecting pits. These all represent the efforts of the "old men" who worked the area for tin in the centuries before the mine came into being.

=== Shafts and adits ===
There are 25 shaftheads visible at Eylesbarrow, most of which are on a single curved alignment along the line of the main lode, which is roughly followed by part of the main track that runs through the mine. The shaftheads exist as conical pits, the smallest being 9m in diameter and the largest, marking Pryce Deacon's Shaft near the eastern end of the alignment, 16m in diameter. Some of them (for instance New Engine Shaft, shown here) have the original masonry collar still visible. Each pit has a spoil heap nearby, usually in the shape of a crescent on the downhill side of the pit. These heaps vary in size; the largest, at Pryce Deacon's Shaft, is over 3 m (9.8 ft) high and covers about 665 square metres (7,160 sq ft). Much interpretative work has taken place to match the visible shafts with the names mentioned in the contemporary documentation, with the result that about half of them can be named and dated with some confidence.

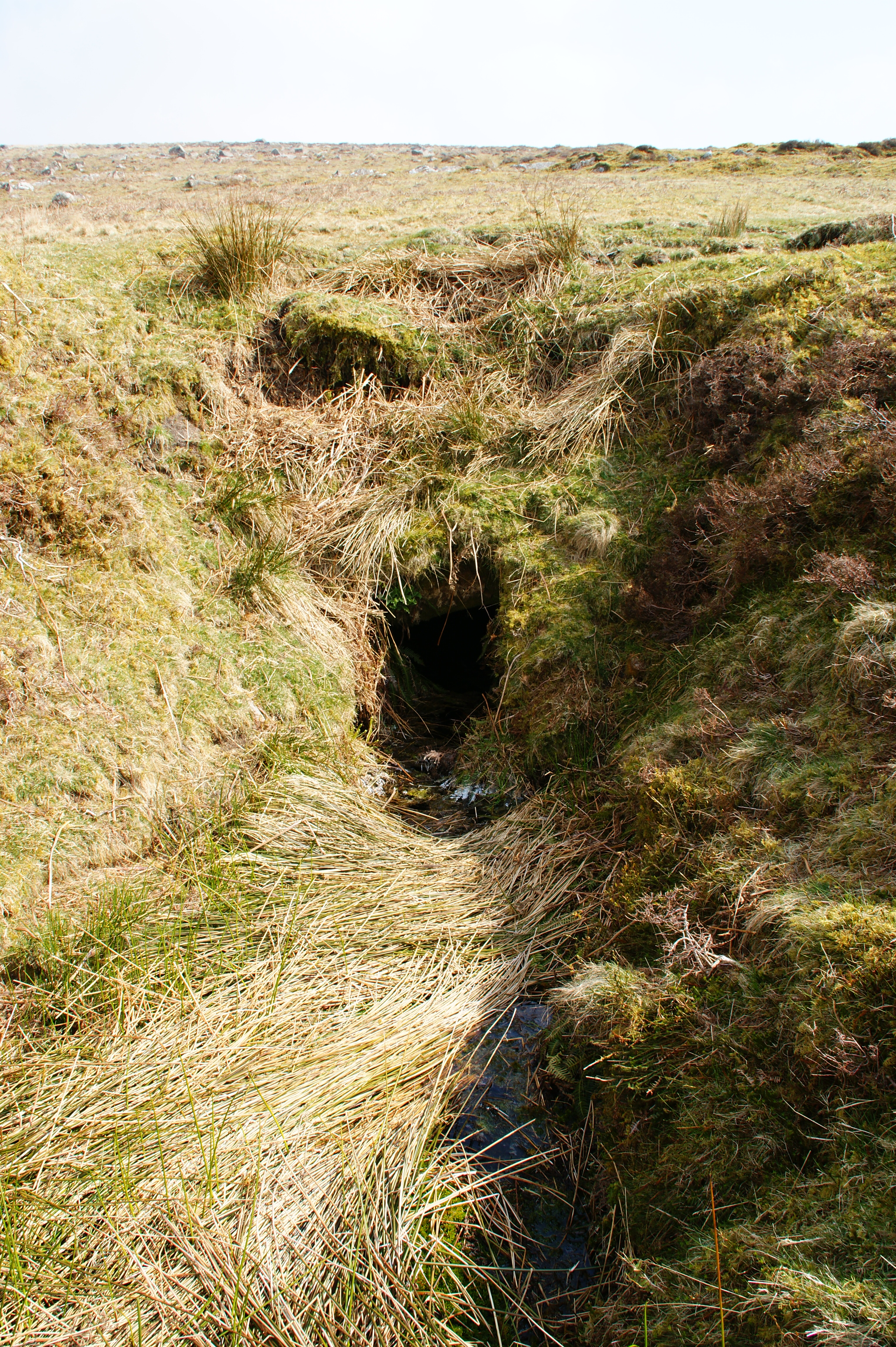
The entrance to Two Brothers Adit

Four adits are referred to in the mine documents. Shallow Adit and Deep Adit both date from the early phase of working, around 1815. Shallow Adit is blocked, its position marked by a stream issuing from the hillside just to the south of the main track. Deep Adit, however, is still open. Its entrance is lined with sturdy granite slabs and is about 2.2 m (7 ft 3 in) high and 0.9 m (2 ft 11 in) wide.

Two Brother's Adit is also still open and discharges an abundant stream of water into the steep-sided gulley that surrounds it. It evidently belongs to the later phase of the mine, being first mentioned in the 1840s. The fourth adit, referred to as Deacon's Adit, is untraceable in the field and may never have passed the planning stage.

=== Leats, reservoir and wheelpits ===
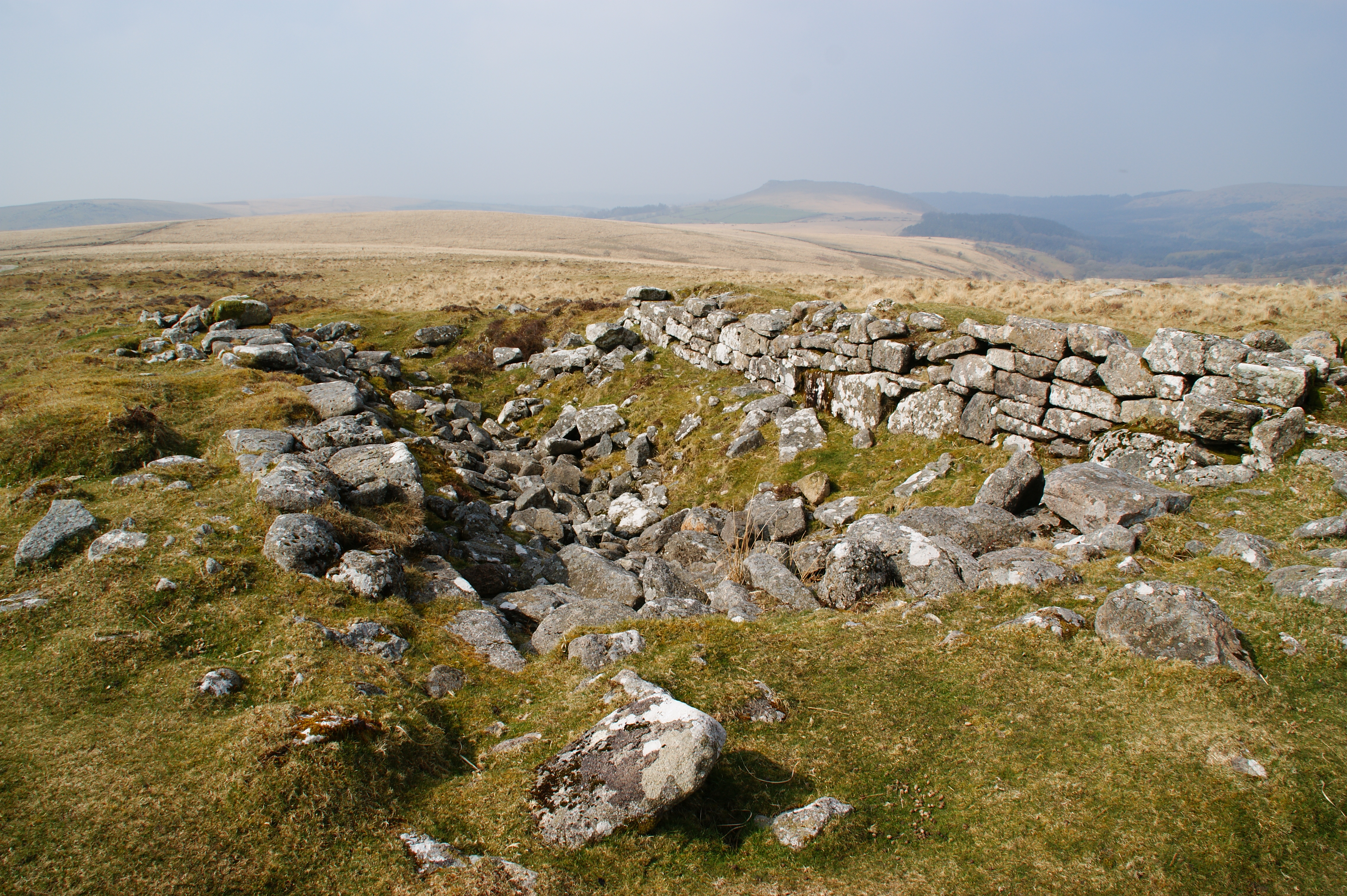
The 1815 wheelpit

Despite the extensive underground workings, no more than one waterwheel was used for pumping water out of the mine. The first waterwheel, whose wheelpit can still be seen just to the north of the main track, was built in 1814–15 and was powered by water carried by a leat that curved around the south side of Higher Hartor Tor drawing water from the upper reaches of the River Plym. In 1818 this leat, known as Engine Leat, was extended over the Plym to also collect water from the Langcombe Brook, a tributary on its south bank. Another leat built in the 1820s attempted to collect water from the hillside to the north. That the water supply was still inadequate at times is shown by the construction, before 1825, of a large linear reservoir on the line of the main leat, the northern end of which is now cut off by the main track which used to pass over it by a bridge. This reservoir was up to 13 m (43 ft) wide and up to 1.3 m (4 ft 3 in) deep and its 192 m (630 ft) long dam was about 10 m (33 ft) thick and reinforced with substantial granite blocks on the inner face. William Crossing reported that the mine owner, a man named Deacon, used to entertain guests by taking them out on the reservoir in a small boat.

Construction of a more powerful waterwheel, the one proposed by Captain Spargo in 1847, was completed by March 1849 at the latest. It replaced the earlier wheel and was sited in the head of the disused Deep Adit Shaft, close to the Two Brothers Adit. This waterwheel had a diameter of 50 ft (15 m) and 3 ft (1 m) breast and was almost certainly the largest on the moor at the time. (Note: A 60 ft (18 m) diameter wheel was installed at Bagtor mine in 1862.) Located about 30 m (98 ft) lower down the hillside, it took advantage of a richer water supply which included the outfall from the nearby adit, an earlier leat drawing water from the Plym, some further leats to the north that attempted to collect water from the surface runoff on the hillside, as well as the re-routed Engine Leat.

Traces of all the above-mentioned features can still be seen in the field.

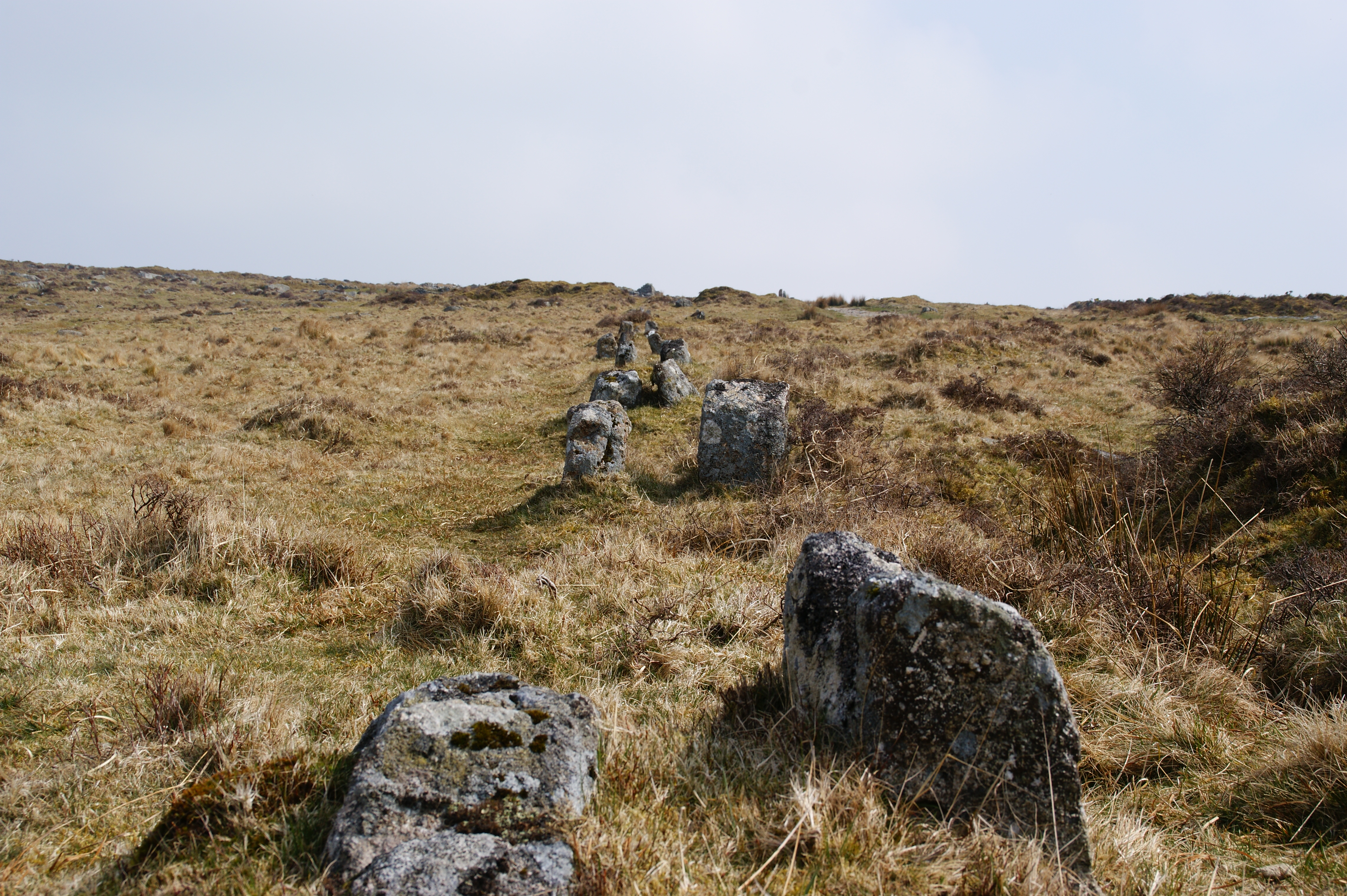
Some of the pillars for the flatrod system that led from the first waterwheel to Old Engine Shaft

=== The flatrod system ===
As a matter of principle a power source (such as a waterwheel) is installed as close as possible to the equipment that it drives (such as a water pump), to minimise the inevitable loss of power incurred in its transmission. When the distance between source and target is significant an efficient means of transferring the power is necessary, and in the 19th century the best method available was the flatrod system. This was used at a number of mines and consisted of a series of linked iron or wooden rods connected to a crank on a waterwheel (or steam engine). The crank converted the circular motion of the wheel into an oscillatory back-and-forth motion of the rods which, suitably supported, could be extended for some distance along the ground. A heavy weight, known as the balance bob, pivoted on one or both ends of the run of the rods kept them under tension and allowed the conversion of the horizontal motion to vertical motion down the shaft.

… 143 fms. iron rods, 2¼ inches wide by 2¾ inches thick, with joints, pins, &c., complete; 153 fms. iron rods, 1¾ in. square … 342 fms. of round iron rods, from 1¼ in. to 1½ in. … 139 cast iron pullies of 17-inch diameter, nearly new; 40 ditto, of 20-inch diameter …

— From the advert for the auction of the mine's equipment. The Mining Journal, 25 September 1852 (Note: fms. is an abbreviation for fathoms. A fathom is equal to 6 ft (1.83 m).)

At Eylesbarrow the engine shafts in which the water pumps were situated were located high on the brow of the hill where there was no adequate water supply for a waterwheel to be located nearby. Consequently, the power from the waterwheel was carried by a flatrod system up the hillside to the shafts. The rods were made of iron and were supported by pulleys with flanged rims that ran on short axles supported by pairs of granite pillars around 0.4 m apart. These pillars had distinctive notches cut into their tops to support the axles. Parts of four runs of these paired posts can be seen today. They vary in height from just above ground level to around a metre, and some run through shallow cuttings, representing the varying contour of the ground.

From the wheelpit of the first waterwheel, two series of double pillars head eastwards up the hill, just to the north of the main track. The northern series heads towards Old Engine Shaft, a distance of 663 metres (2,175 ft). This shaft was in use from 1814 onwards. The southern, less well preserved series, probably led to Pryce Deacon's Shaft, 777 metres (2,549 ft) away, and may have been in use in the 1840s.

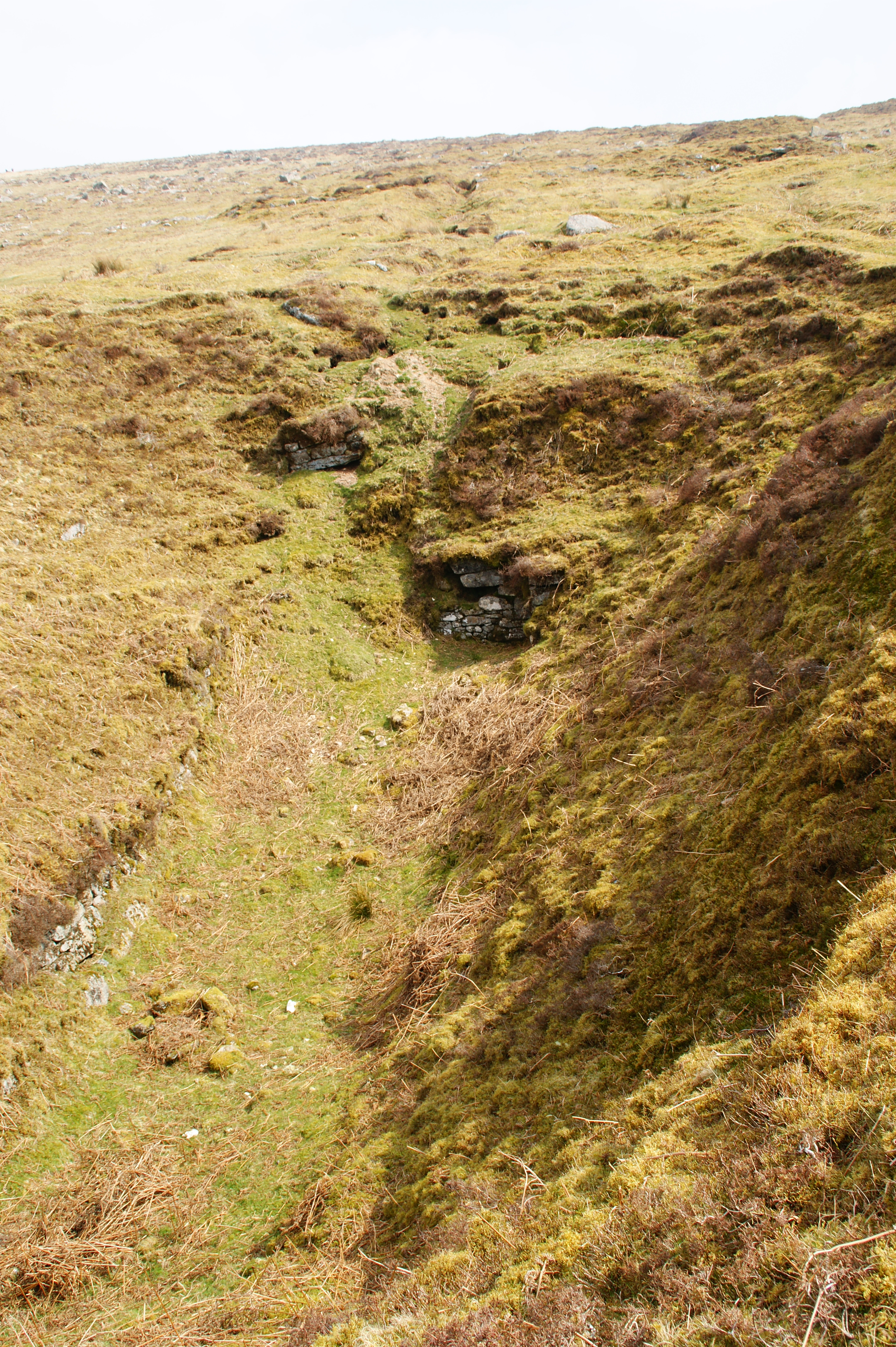
The remains of the wheelpit for the 50 ft wheel

In the second, later, wheelpit, pictured here, the wheel itself was on the south side of the pit (on the right in this photograph). The short length of wall on the right is the end wall of the wheelpit. The mechanism operating the flatrod system was on the north side, aligned with the short section of wall visible further away on the left: this probably formed part of the first support for the flatrods, which are believed to have travelled underground until they reached a V-shaped gulley, just visible towards the top of the photograph.

This flatrods from this wheel led towards Pryce Deacon's Shaft, 961 metres (3,153 ft) away and also to Henry's Engine Shaft, 854 metres (2,802 ft) away. A spur leads off at an angle to another unnamed shaft to the north, 1,192 m (3,911 ft) distant. The chronology of the use of these systems is not certain, though the extension to the northern shaft probably represents the very last phase of underground mining at the site.

=== Stamping mills and smelting house ===
The purpose of a stamping mill is to crush the mined ore to a fine sand which is then processed at an adjacent "dressing floor" to separate the heavier tin ore from the waste material or "gangue", which is dumped. There are remains of six stamping mills at Eylesbarrow mine, an unusually high number, although they were not all in use at the same time. They form a rough line down the hillside into the head of the Drizzlecombe valley and in the literature they are numbered from 1 to 6: No. 1 is the highest, located just below the first pumping waterwheel to the north of the main track; No. 6 is about 0.75 km (0.47 mi) distant and some 35 m (115 ft) lower down the slope. The prominent wall with a hole in it just below the main track is the side wall of the wheelpit of stamping mill No. 2, the hole marking the location of the axle.

The oldest mill is No. 4 which was operating in 1804, followed the next year by No. 6., a large construction which had its waterwheel in the centre of the floor with machinery on both sides. Both these were powered by the lower of the two leats that took water from the River Plym. The major works undertaken on the mine in 1814 included the construction of three new mills (Nos. 1, 2 and 3) and the cutting of the higher (Engine) leat to power them.

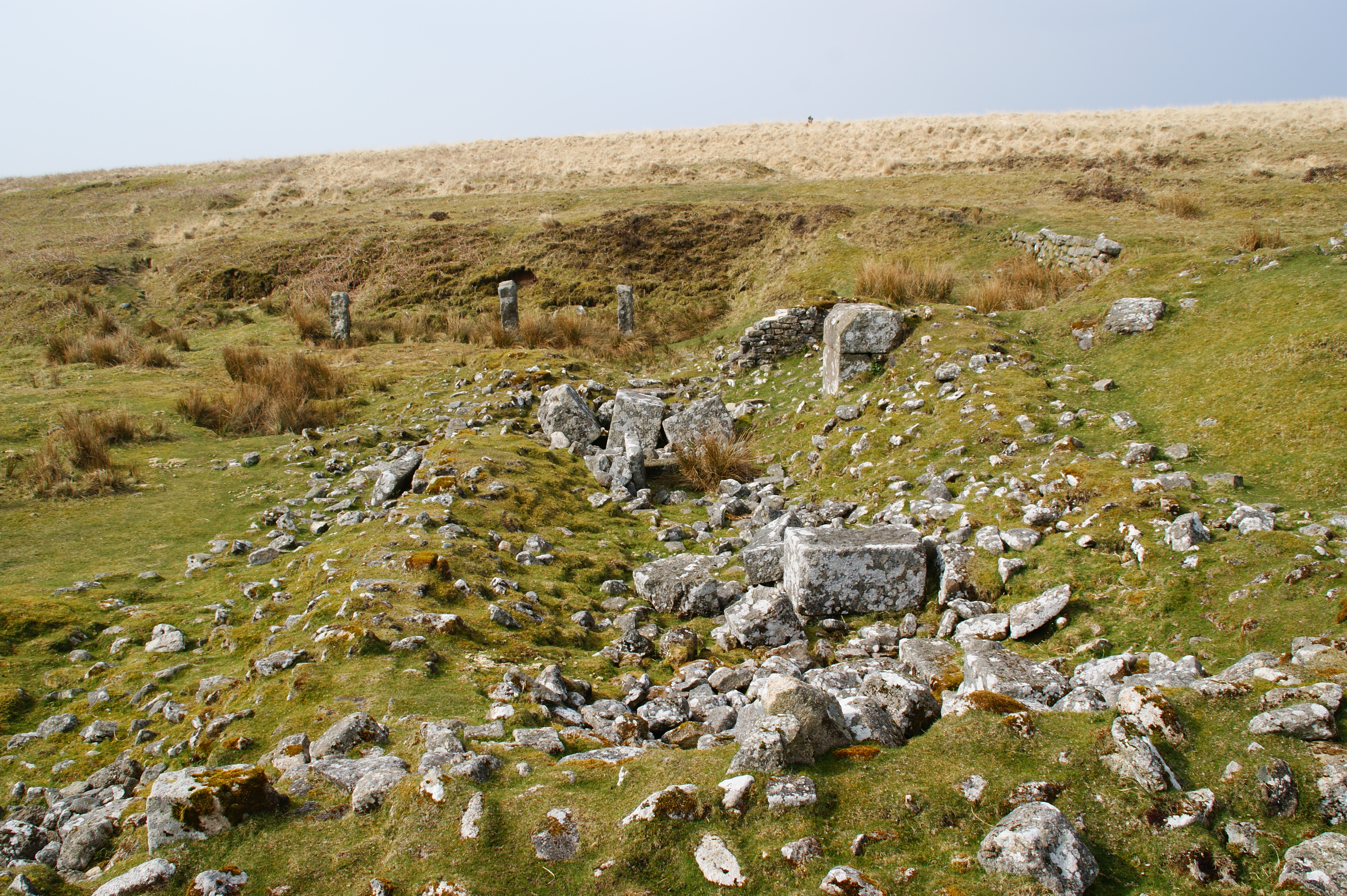
The remains of the smelting house...

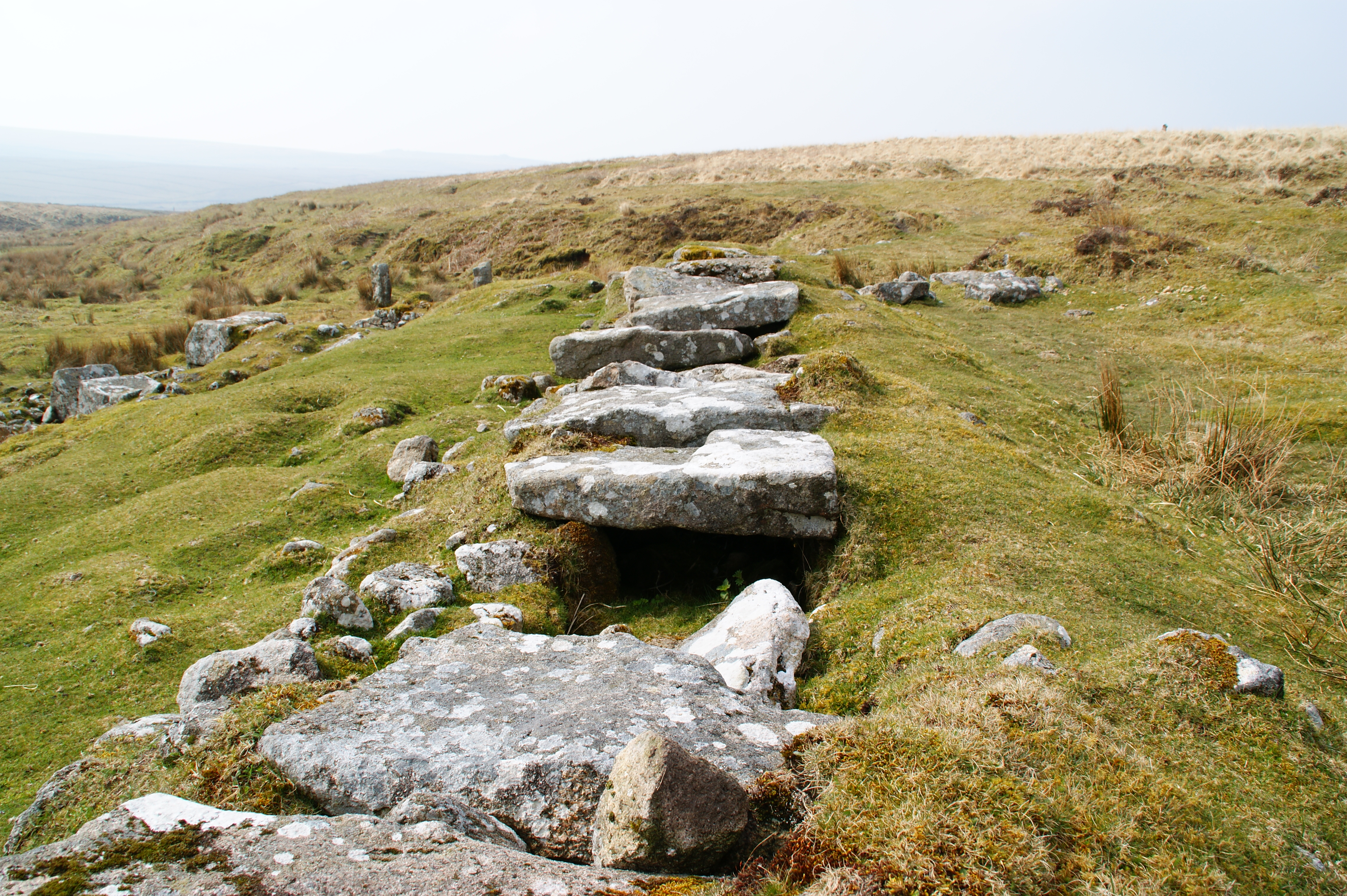
...and its flue

Mill No. 5, which had the smelter attached, was completed by 1822. The smelting house (shown here as it looks today) had two furnaces. There was a reverberatory furnace —the large squared block in the foreground was part of this; and an older-style blast furnace, similar in design to a blowing house, but with a unique flue running up the hillside behind to a short stack. The two large standing and three fallen granite blocks towards the back of the building are the remains of this furnace.

The wheelpit for the waterwheel that powered the bellows of the blast furnace was immediately behind the short length of standing wall, and the small stamping mill and dressing floor were behind again, on the other side of the wheel. The three stone pillars in the background are believed to have supported a roof structure later in the history of the mine, after smelting ceased.

=== Other remains ===
Some of the shafts have balance-bob pits associated with them, and there are traces of horse-whims, which were used to raise or lower items in the shafts. Several "reck houses", used for further processing of the crushed ore, are also visible. The ruins of the "mansion" or mine captain's house and its associated buildings can be seen to the north of the main track. There are further remains of an associated mine known as Wheal Katherine about a kilometre to the east—these include six shafts, a wheelpit and another stamping mill (known as No. 7).

== Sources ==
- Atkinson, Michael; Burt, Roger; Waite, Peter (1978). Dartmoor Mines – The Mines of the Granite Mass. Exeter: University of Exeter. ISBN 0-906231-00-0.
- Cook, R. M. L.; Greeves, T. A. P.; Kilvington, C. C. (1974). "Eylesbarrow (1814–1852) – A Study of a Dartmoor Tin Mine". Report & Transactions of the Devonshire Association. 106: 161–214.
- Dines, H. G. (1956). The Metalliferous Mining Region of South-West England. Volume II. London: HMSO. p. 731.
- Edmonds, E. A.; McKeown, M. C.; Williams, M. (1985). British Regional Geology - South West England. London: HMSO. p. 49. ISBN 0-11-880713-7.
- Hamilton Jenkin, A. K. (1974). Mines of Devon. Volume I, The Southern Area. Newton Abbot: David & Charles. pp. 87–90. ISBN 0-7153-6784-6.
- Newman, Phil (1998). The Dartmoor Tin Industry - A Field Guide. Newton Abbot: Chercombe Press. ISBN 0-9532708-0-7.
- Newman, Phil (1999). "Eylesbarrow (Ailsborough) Tin Mine". Proceedings of the Devon Archaeological Society. 57: 105–148. ISSN 0305-5795.
- Worth, R. N. (1967). Spooner, G. M.; Russell, F. S. (eds.). Worth's Dartmoor. Newton Abbot: David & Charles. ISBN 0715351486.
- "Search results for "Eylesbarrow"". (Note that according to the grid reference, image da000129 is a photograph of the "Mansion House", not the smelting-house; and da000130 is clearly spurious). Dartmoor Archive. Retrieved on 2009-04-01.
