= Bellwether =

Bellwether primarily refers to:

- Wether (ruminant), a castrated sheep or goat that has a bell placed on its neck intended to lead a herd of sheep and be easily tracked
- Bellwether (politics), a region whose election results closely tracks wider political trends
  - List of election bellwether counties in the United States, counties in the United States said to track US presidential election results

Bellwether may also refer to:

- Bellwether (novel), a 1996 Connie Willis novel
- Bellwether trial, a test case to determine the merits of a legal argument or claim
- Bellwether Gallery, an art gallery in Chelsea, New York City, from 1999 to 2009
- Bellwether Pictures, a film studio established in 2011
- Bellwether Prize, a literary award established in 2000
- Dawn Bellwether, a character in the 2016 film Zootopia
- Mira Bellwether (1982–2022), author of the zine Fucking Trans Women
