= Birch Tor and Vitifer mine =

Former tin mine in Devon, England

Birch Tor and Vitifer
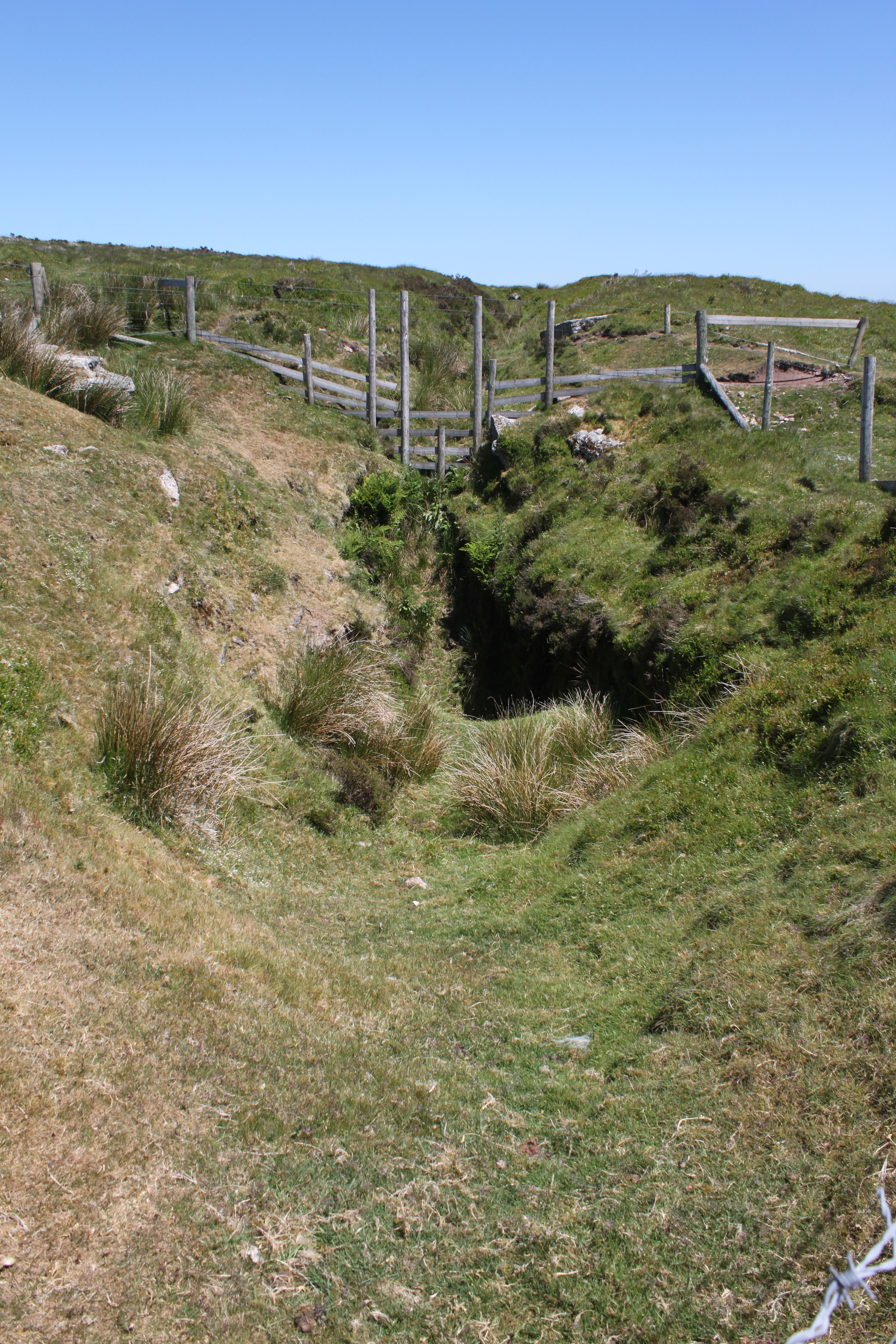

- Location in Devon

Location
- Location: Dartmoor, Devon, England; 50°36′43″N 3°52′05″W

Production
- Products: Tin

History
- Opened: 1750 (approx)
- Closed: 1925

Owner
- Company: Various

Birch Tor and Vitifer mine was a tin mine on Dartmoor, Devon, England. Located in the valley of the Redwater Brook, to the east of the B3212 Moretonhampstead to Princetown road, below the Warren House Inn, the mine was worked between the mid–18th century and 1925.

== History ==
In medieval times, or even before, the area later occupied by this mine was at the centre of the most extensive surface mining operations on Dartmoor, and today it is still scarred by the waste heaps left by stream working and numerous gullies of open cast mining.

Strictly speaking, Birch Tor mine on the eastern side of the Redwater Brook valley and Vitifer mine on the west were separate mines, but for most of their working lives they were operated under the same management, so they are usually considered together. The first documentary reference to "Vitifer Mine" was in 1750, and to "Burch Tor Bounds" in 1757. By the 1780s Vitifer was being operated by the Dartmoor Mining and Smelting Company, and in 1796 it was said to be employing 40 men. A few years later it was reported that the mine had a 36 ft (11 m) water wheel for pumping water out of the mine, and it had a half-mile long adit that had taken nearly four years to drive up the valley. At this time the ore from the mine was sent to Cornwall for smelting, but by the 1820s it was being smelted at Eylesbarrow mine, also on Dartmoor.

the accommodation offered … is so wretched that they are obliged to succeed each other in the same bed, which is thus in use throughout the 24 hours.

— Papers, dated 3 Feb 1835, held by the Duchy of Cornwall Office.

In 1834 the mine was reported to be "large and profitable", but the conditions for the more than 100 employees, including women and children, were very poor and many of the miners there were said to be refugees from other districts on account of petty crimes they had committed. At this time, one of the men who worked underground at Birch Tor said that the quality of the air down the mine was so bad that "it killed scores of miners".

In 1838 Birch Tor mine had two 40 ft waterwheels and one of 32 ft and it was said to be the only mine of any size working on Dartmoor. The two mines were amalgamated in 1845 and the underground workings were then being drained by two waterwheels of 45 ft diameter. It was around this time that it was discovered that the deeper excavations were not producing the quality of ore that had been expected, unlike many of the mines in Cornwall which proved to be richer in tin at depth.

By the 1850s the mine had only about 20 men working, but by 1863 it had revived and had about 150 employees. The next year was its peak, when it sold 150 tons of black tin. In 1870 it was still employing 102 people, but it was abandoned in 1882. From 1887 to 1903 a small amount of work continued at the mine under Moses Bawden, who had been involved with the mine since the 1860s; and from 1903 to 1913 new owners Phelips and Padfield kept just over 20 miners employed each year. This was the last underground work done at the mine, but the dumps were reworked until 1925, and although some further work on the dumps was undertaken in 1938–9, there is no record of any production from this period.

== Sources ==
- Greeves, Tom (2001). Tin Mines and Miners of Dartmoor (3rd ed.). Tiverton, Devon: Halsgrove. ISBN 0-86114-766-9.
- Hamilton Jenkin, A. K. (1974). Mines of Devon. Volume I, The Southern Area. Newton Abbot: David & Charles. pp. 87–90. ISBN 0-7153-6784-6.
- Newman, Phil (1998). The Dartmoor Tin Industry - A Field Guide. Newton Abbot: Chercombe Press. ISBN 0-9532708-0-7.
