= Dartmoor tin mining =

Mining industry in Devon, England

Coordinates: 50°34′N 4°0′W

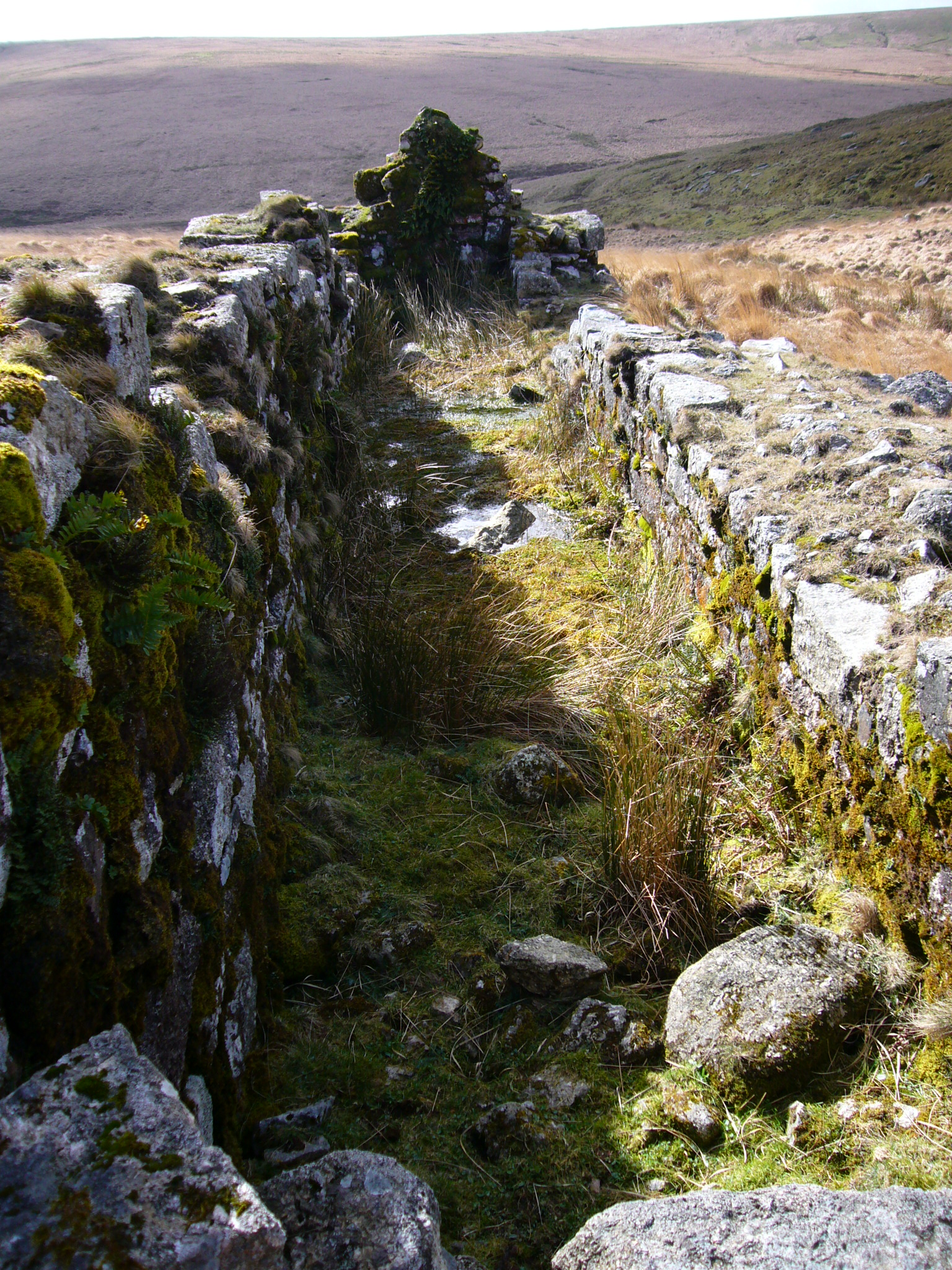
The wheelpit at Huntingdon mine

The tin mining industry on Dartmoor, Devon, England, is thought to have originated in pre-Roman times, and continued right through to the 20th century, when the last commercially worked mine (Golden Dagger Mine) closed in November 1930 (though it saw work during the Second World War), and "composite mines" such as those producing tin as a by- product, such as Hemerdon Mine in Plympton continue to operate today. From the 12th century onwards tin mining was regulated by a stannary parliament which had its own laws.

Tin is smelted from cassiterite, a mineral found in hydrothermal veins in granite, and the uplands of Dartmoor were a particularly productive area. The techniques used for the extraction of tin from Dartmoor followed a progression from streaming through open cast mining to underground mining. Today, there are extensive archaeological remains of these three phases of the industry, as well as of the several stages of processing that were necessary to convert the ore to tin metal.

== Stannary law ==
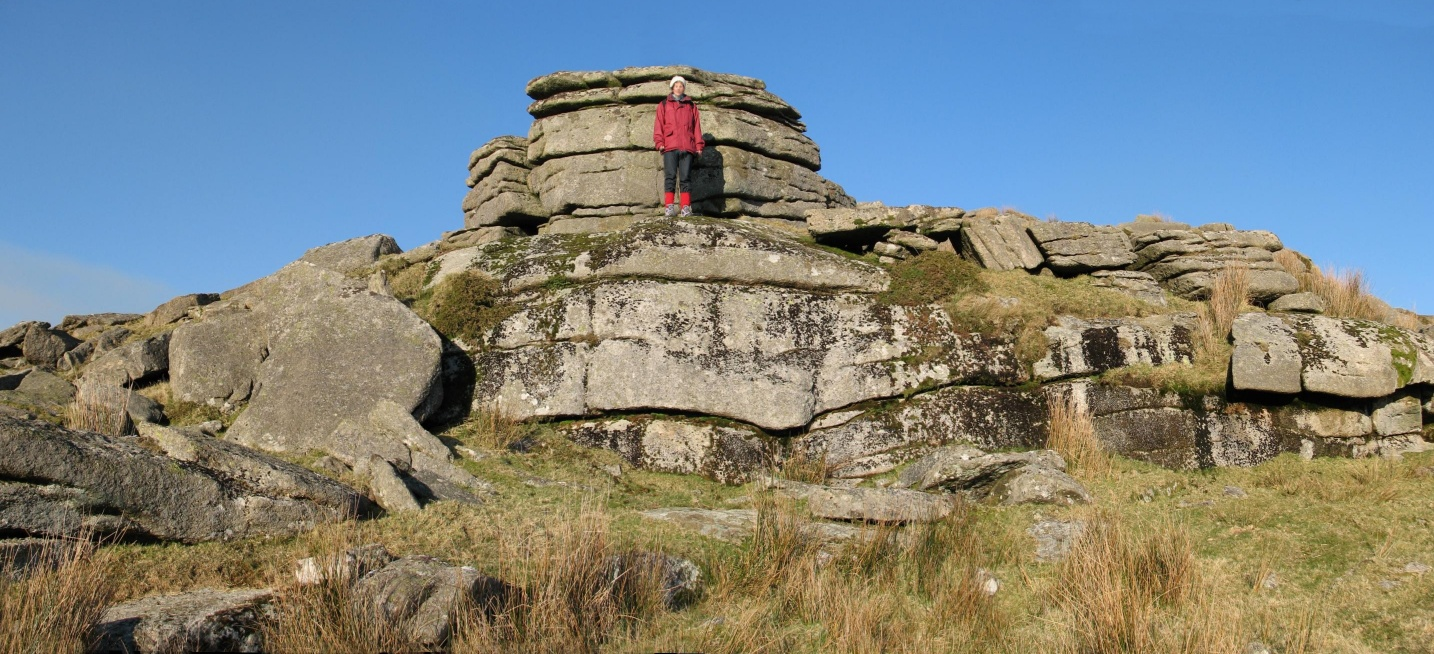
Crockern Tor – Parliament Rock as seen from the "floor" of the Great Court.

Mining became such an important part of life in the region that as early as the 12th century, tin miners developed their own set of laws (stannary law) and, ultimately, their own parliaments (stannary parliaments). These laws applied to anyone involved in the industry.

Stannaries were established in Tavistock, Ashburton and Chagford by King Edward I in 1305. Plympton followed soon after. The Devon stannary parliament met in an open-air forum at Crockern Tor from 1494.

Anyone who broke a stannary law could find himself imprisoned in the gaol at Lydford. The stannary courts were abolished in 1836.

== Geology ==
The majority of the tin mines on Dartmoor are located in granite country rock and most of the lodes trend ENE–WSW and are of limited length, though there are exceptions. In the underground workings, the tin ore, cassiterite, was usually found in association with large amounts of tourmaline, and in central Dartmoor with much specular haematite. In the southern part of the moor, the cassiterite was usually found in relatively large grains, but the lodes were of very variable quality. These factors, combined with the fact that none of the underground workings was found to be profitable at depth, (Note: Unlike Cornwall, where many tin mines remained productive at great depth (500 fathoms (910 metres) at South Crofty, for instance), the mines on Dartmoor became less productive as they were deepened. The deepest excavations on Dartmoor were no more than 40 fathoms (about 70 metres) below the valley floor, at Vitifer mine.) are typical of the deepest zone of tin mineralisation. The once very extensive alluvial deposits of tin ore, that were the first deposits to be mined, also point to the vast quantity of ore that once existed in lodes that have been eroded from above the granite since it was emplaced in the Carboniferous period.

== Mining methods ==
=== Streaming ===
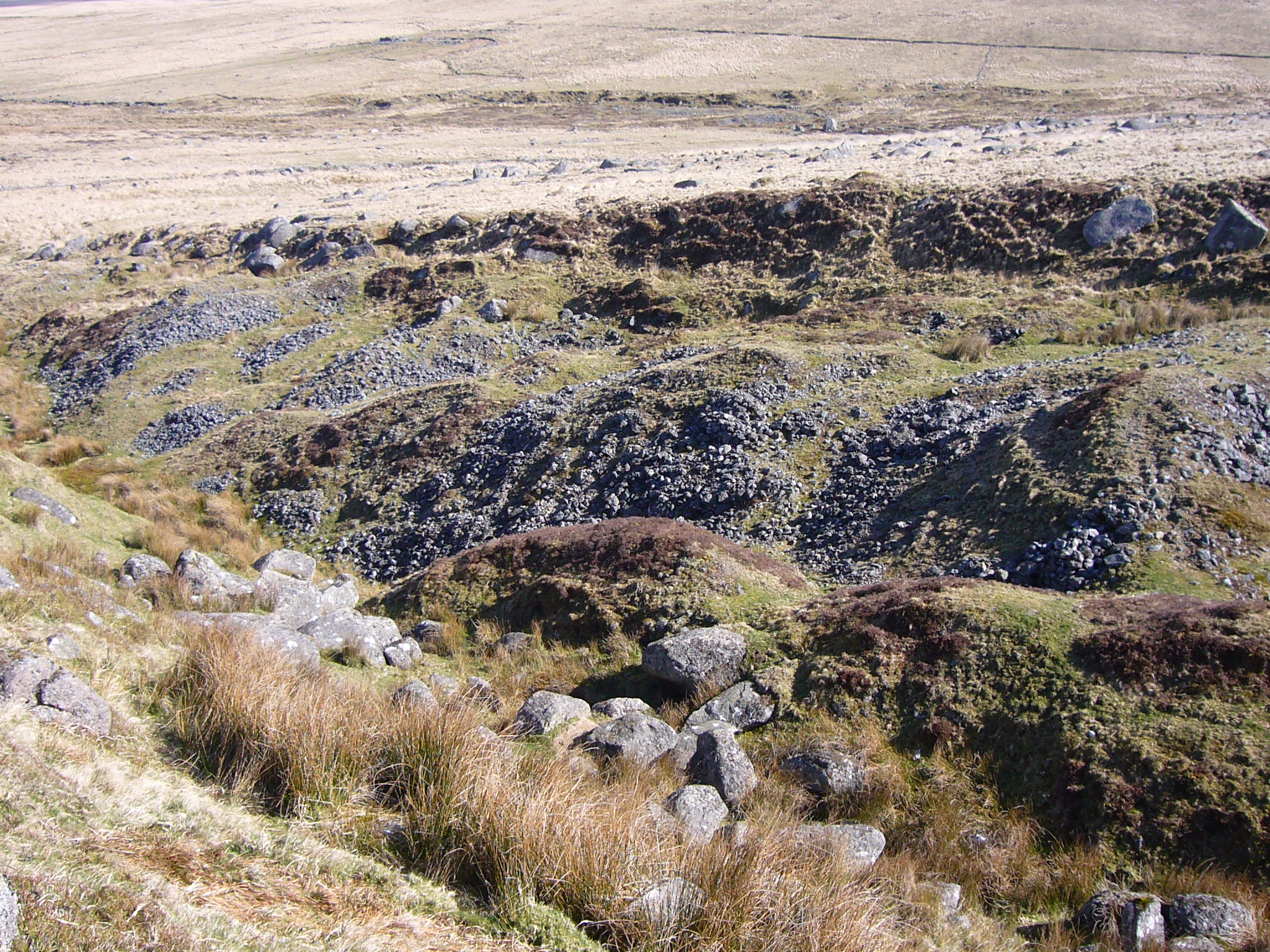
An example of the characteristic pattern of parallel ridges and scarp left by tin-streaming, east of Fox Tor.

The earliest means of recovery, known as streaming or streamworking, involved the collection of alluvial deposits from river and stream beds where they had accumulated after being eroded from the ore-bearing lodes. The geological processes that resulted in the deposition of the cassiterite in the stream beds often resulted in very pure tin gravel which was mixed with gravels of other, unwanted, minerals such as quartz, mica and feldspar, collectively known as gangue. It was relatively easy to separate these minerals on the basis of their very different specific gravities – cassiterite about 7 and gangue 3 or less. The separation was performed by passing a stream of water over the gravels: the gangue would be washed away faster than the wanted tin gravel.

Once a tin-bearing valley had been identified, the stream-workers would arrange a stream of water, probably carried by a leat from higher up the valley, and starting at the lowest end of the deposit they would dig a trench (known as the "tye") as deep as possible to allow the finer gangue to be washed away. From there they would start working up the valley, using the stream of water to wash over the debris they had loosened from the bed with picks. This method of working leaves characteristic evidence in the valleys - a series of ridges of the larger gangue material, sometimes roughly perpendicular to, sometimes coaxial with the line of the valley, sometimes apparently haphazard, all bounded by a scarp which marked the edge of the worked ground and whose height relates to the depth of the deposits.

Eluvial deposits—those that had weathered from the lode in the usual way, but had not then been transported by flowing water—were also worked; these tended to be poorer deposits due to the lack of sorting that a stream provides, and they usually did not have such a ready supply of water available to work them. They are found on gently sloping hillsides. Where possible the water needed to work these deposits was carried by a leat from the nearest available river, or if the site was above such supplies, reservoirs were constructed to collect rainwater and runoff from hillsides.

A study has shown that a phase of aggradation occurred in the Erme valley between the 4th century and 7th century, providing evidence of late Roman or early post-Roman tin mining activity in this valley. The same study confirmed what documentary evidence also relates: that there was a boom in tin production in the 13th century. The earliest written record of tin streaming comes from the 12th century.

=== Open cast ===
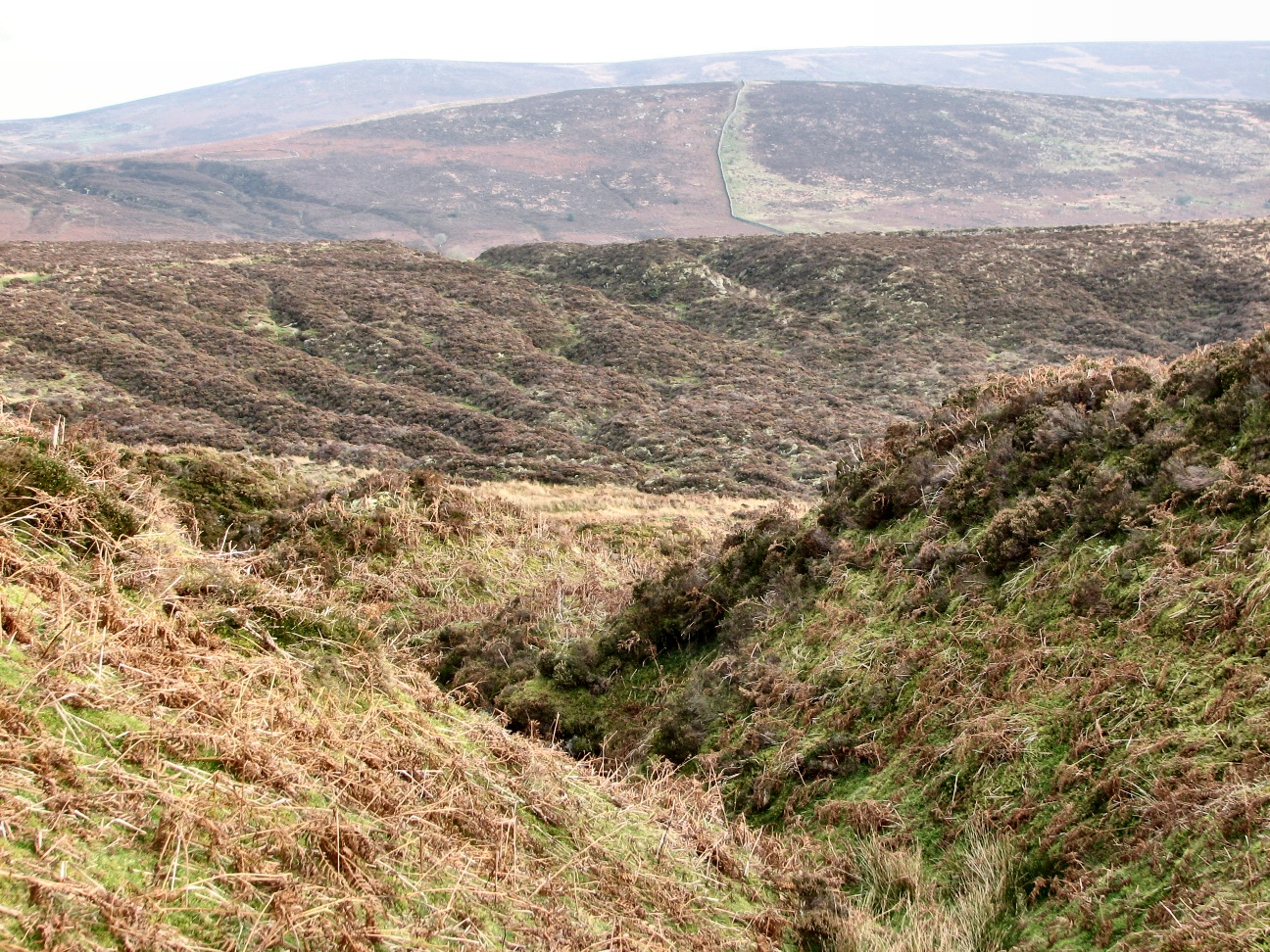
Openworks near the Warren House Inn. Looking down one gully towards a group of them in the middle distance, and more on the left side of the ridge beyond.

By the 15th century, the sources of stream tin were becoming scarce and since the demand for tin was as strong as ever, the direct working of lodes was considered viable despite the greater effort needed in both extraction and refining. "Beamworks" was the name given by the tinners to workings where the lode was followed by digging down from the surface, and the massive gullies that resulted remain prominent features of the moor today. Several of these gullies retain names that include the word beam: Gibby Beam, Willabeam and Scudley Beam, for example. They are also known as "openworks" or "gerts".

Another method of surface mining involved digging pits at intervals along the lode – this was known as "lodeback-work". At times these pits were dug in pairs along the back of the lode and the lode followed underground between them. This may have been the precursor to beamworks in a number of locations, but enough lodeback pits survive to indicate that it was a separate technique. The issue that mine managers had to decide was whether it was worth removing the extra overburden to form a gulley in order to be able to mine deeper into the lode.

In a similar fashion to streamworking, much use was made of water for the removal of the overburden and gangue. When digging large gullies the overburden, which consisted at least partly of decomposed granite ("growan"), was loosened with picks, and then water was used to wash away the unwanted material instead of manhandling it. Means of collecting, diverting and storing water were always associated with openworks. In some cases when only poor sources of water were available complex systems of reservoirs were built.

=== Underground ===
The Dartmoor tin industry declined in importance during the early 18th century and had fallen to nothing by 1730. This was due to a number of factors, but the most important was likely to be the exhaustion of the easily accessible deposits. It was not until the Industrial Revolution fuelled demand for all metals and also provided the technology to mine them that mining resumed on the moor on any scale.

Although underground mining technology had been available for many centuries, it is likely that the joint problems of the hardness of the granite rock and the preponderance of underground water together with the relatively easy pickings from near the surface made deep mining unviable until the late 18th century.

Many small mining enterprises started up on Dartmoor in the late 18th and 19th centuries – 48 mines are known to have produced some tin during this period. Many of these ventures were unsuccessful, despite being given optimistic names like Wheal Fortune, Wheal Lucky and Wheal Prosper (the common prefix Wheal is a Celtic word meaning "mine" or "works"). Some larger mines, however, such as Eylesbarrow and the Vitifer – Birch Tor complex were productive for many years.

Almost all of the underground mines re-worked lodes that had already been mined from the surface. Because of the great quantity of underground water, it was necessary to dig horizontal adits into the hillsides to de-water the mines. Dartmoor's topography, cut with deep valleys, helped there and in many cases it was possible to dig to a reasonable depth without the need to pump out water. These adits connected with shafts that were either sunk vertically downwards or followed the line of the steeply dipping lode. Working the lode then took place by stoping from the horizontal levels in the usual manner.

When it became necessary to go deeper than the lowest adit, it was essential to pump out the water. Large waterwheels were used for this and where the shaft was higher than a good water supply, the waterwheel was located lower down the hillside and the power transferred up to the shaft by a "flatrod" system. Evidence for these systems survives as double rows of stones with grooves on their tops – these held the pulleys that guided the metal rods. Such stone rows are still visible at Eylesbarrow and at Hexworthy.

The discovery of extensive tin deposits in Malaya in the later 19th century had a major impact on the Dartmoor industry, and many miners emigrated. The last tin mine on Dartmoor eventually closed just before the Second World War, although Hemerdon Mine, or Hemerdon Ball, was mined for tungsten and tin on a trial basis in the 1980s, leading to the re-opening this mine with first production in 2015.

== Processing ==
After collection the tin ore had to be crushed, concentrated and then smelted. Over time a series of ever more sophisticated processes were used for these operations.

=== Crushing ===
Early streamworkers operating on a small scale used a block of hard stone as a mortar and perhaps a metalbound piece of wood or a ball of stone as a pestle to break up the ore when necessary, but the rich gravels would have required little or no crushing before concentration. A later technique called "crazing" employed a pair of circular stones used like millstones, the top one rotating on the fixed lower stone. The coarse gravel or crushed ore was introduced into a hole in the centre of the top stone and was rendered to a fine sand. Only three examples of such crazing mills have been found; at Gobbet mine both stones are still visible.

As it became necessary to regularly process pieces of ore-bearing rock that were too large to be directly ground in a crazing mill, stamping was introduced. This involved vertical hammers powered by a waterwheel in a Stamp mill, of which at least 60 are known to have existed on Dartmoor. The first documentary evidence for a stamping mill on Dartmoor is dated 1504, though they would almost certainly have been in use earlier than this (the first reference for Cornwall is from 1400, for instance). Stamping mills were also known as "knacking" or "knocking" mills; Knacking Mill Gulf, a shallow side valley in the upper reaches of the River Erme, attests to the existence of such a mill there at one time.

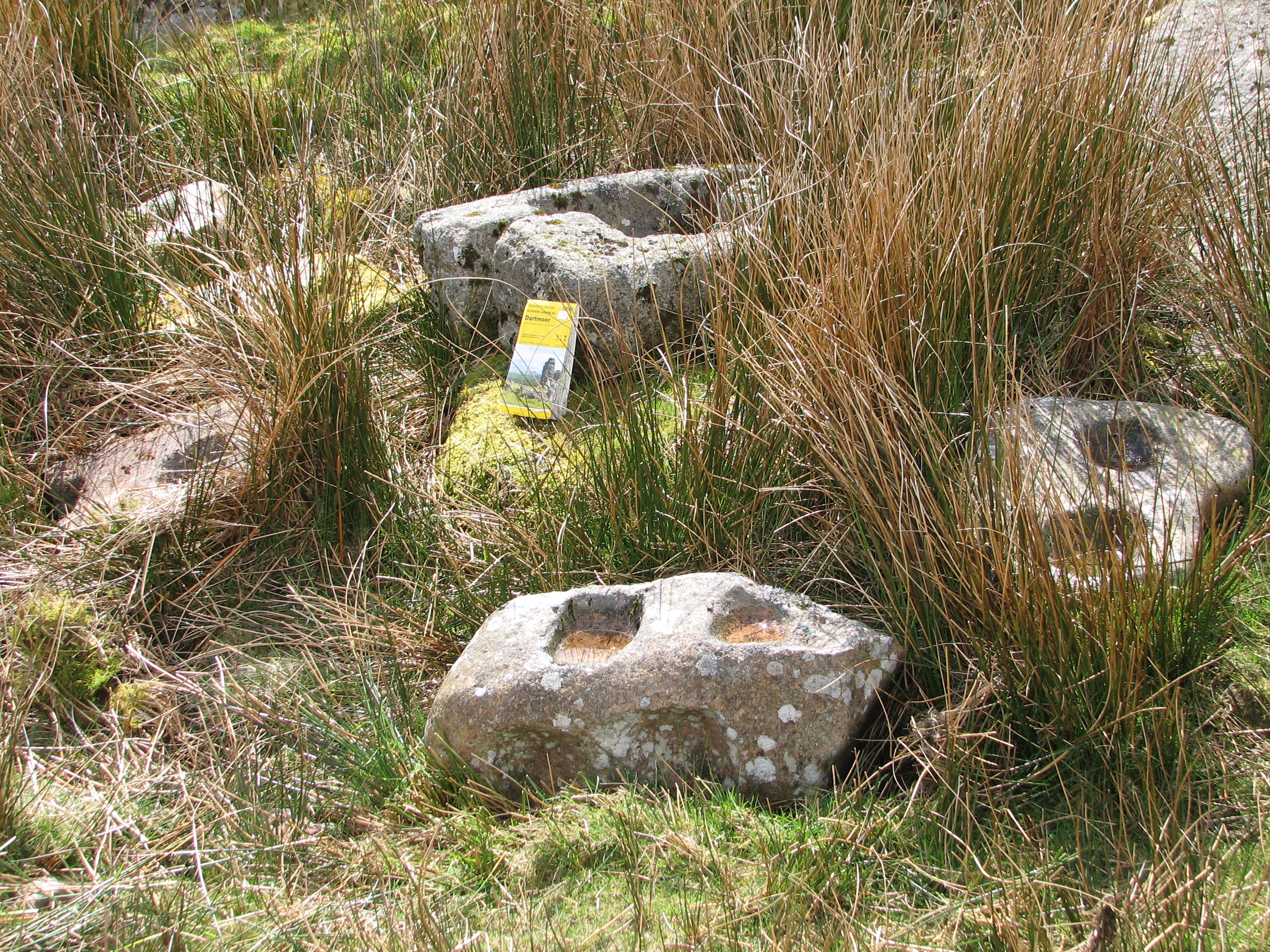
Discarded mortarstones and a broken mouldstone at the Walkham Valley higher tin mill.

The hammers or "stamps" in a stamping mill consisted of vertical balks of timber, iron-shod at the bottom, which were lifted by cams attached to the waterwheel drive shaft, and repeatedly dropped onto the ore which lay on a block of granite known as a mortarstone. There were usually two or three of these stamps in a row, powered by the same drive and operating in sequence. At first this process operated on the dry ore, which was shovelled in and removed by hand. However, in a 16th-century innovation from Europe, the stamp heads were surrounded by a wooden box with a finely perforated grill at one end and the ore was washed into the box by a stream of water which also washed out the crushed ore once it was just fine enough to pass through the grill. This was a vast improvement over dry stamping because it was a continuous process that also stopped the production of unwanted very fine dust.

The characteristic indicator of a former stamping mill is the mortarstone. These are blocks of granite up to a metre long with flat faces bearing two, three or (rarely) four circular or elliptical hollows usually around 17 cm in diameter and up to about 10 cm deep. Many of these mortarstones have hollows on more than one face, showing that they were turned and reused once the hollows became too deep for effective stamping.

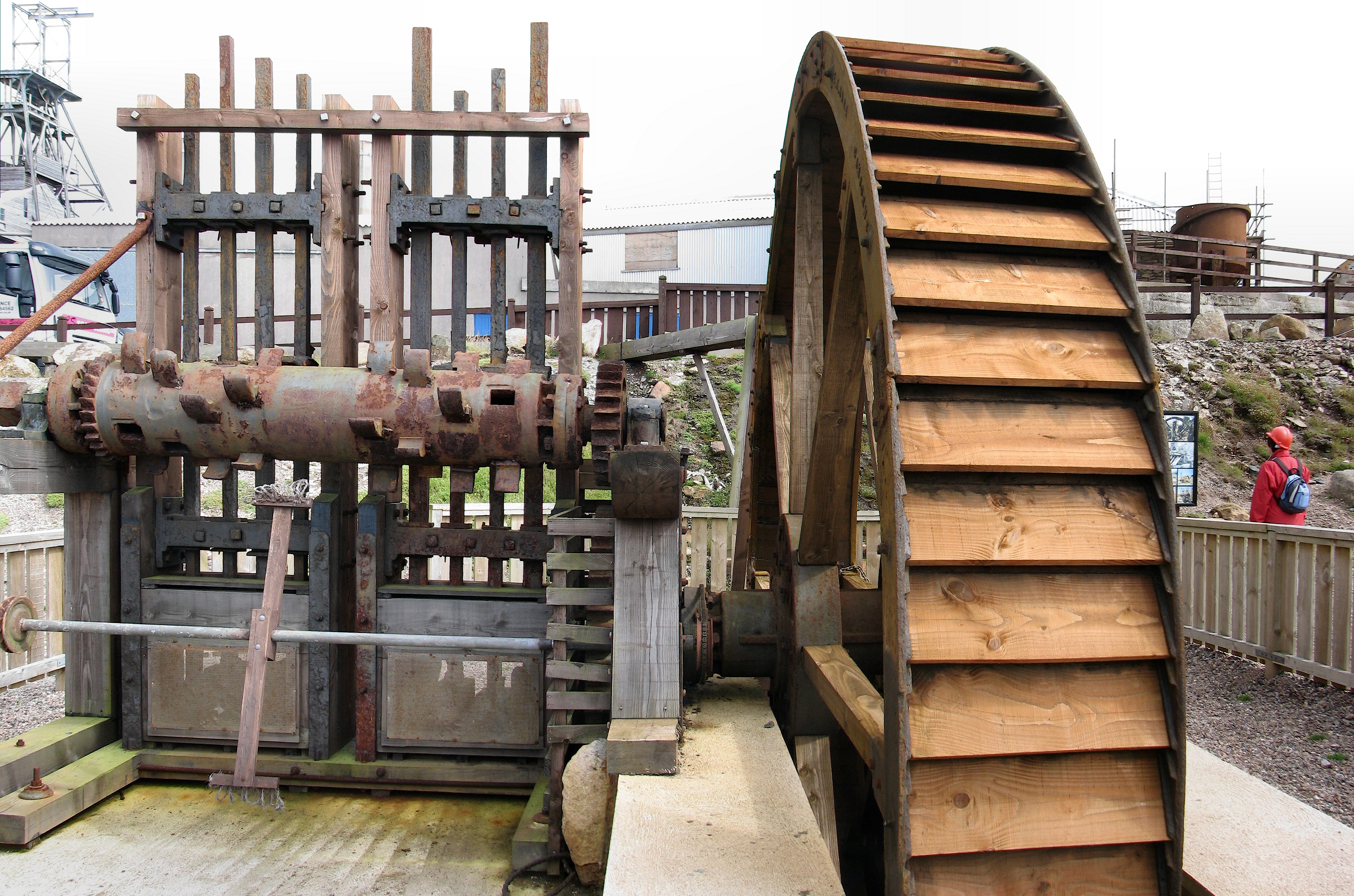
A set of eight Cornish stamps, similar to those in use on the moor in the 19th century

Improvements to the technology in the 18th and 19th centuries involved increasing the number of stamping heads and replacing the granite mortarstone with a thick bed of crushed quartz contained in a masonry or iron box. By the 1900s there were several different types of stamps in use: Cornish, Californian, Holman's Pneumatic, etc.

=== Concentration ===
Although individual grains or pebbles of alluvial tin collected by streaming were often of high purity it was usually still necessary to remove the unwanted "gangue" material before the ore could be smelted. The need for this process, which was known as dressing the ore, increased as the poorer sources of lode tin were exploited. The principle of concentration was a refined version of that used by the early tin-streamers: it depended on the large difference in specific gravity between the wanted tin ore and the gangue. Many different mechanical methods were used, including rectangular and circular buddles, Wilfley tables and revolving slime tables, kieves, trommels, and even magnetic separation.

An early separation method was the rectangular buddle which was simply a slightly inclined plane over which the crushed material was washed by a gentle stream of water. The heavier ore would settle near the top of the incline while the lighter material would settle lower down or be washed off the buddle altogether. As there was a gradation in quality from the top to the bottom, the mineworker's skill lay in deciding where to make the dividing line between the wanted material and the waste. The division was often made in three parts: the "heads", which represented the best quality ore; the "middles", which was often reprocessed; and the "tailings", which was dumped.

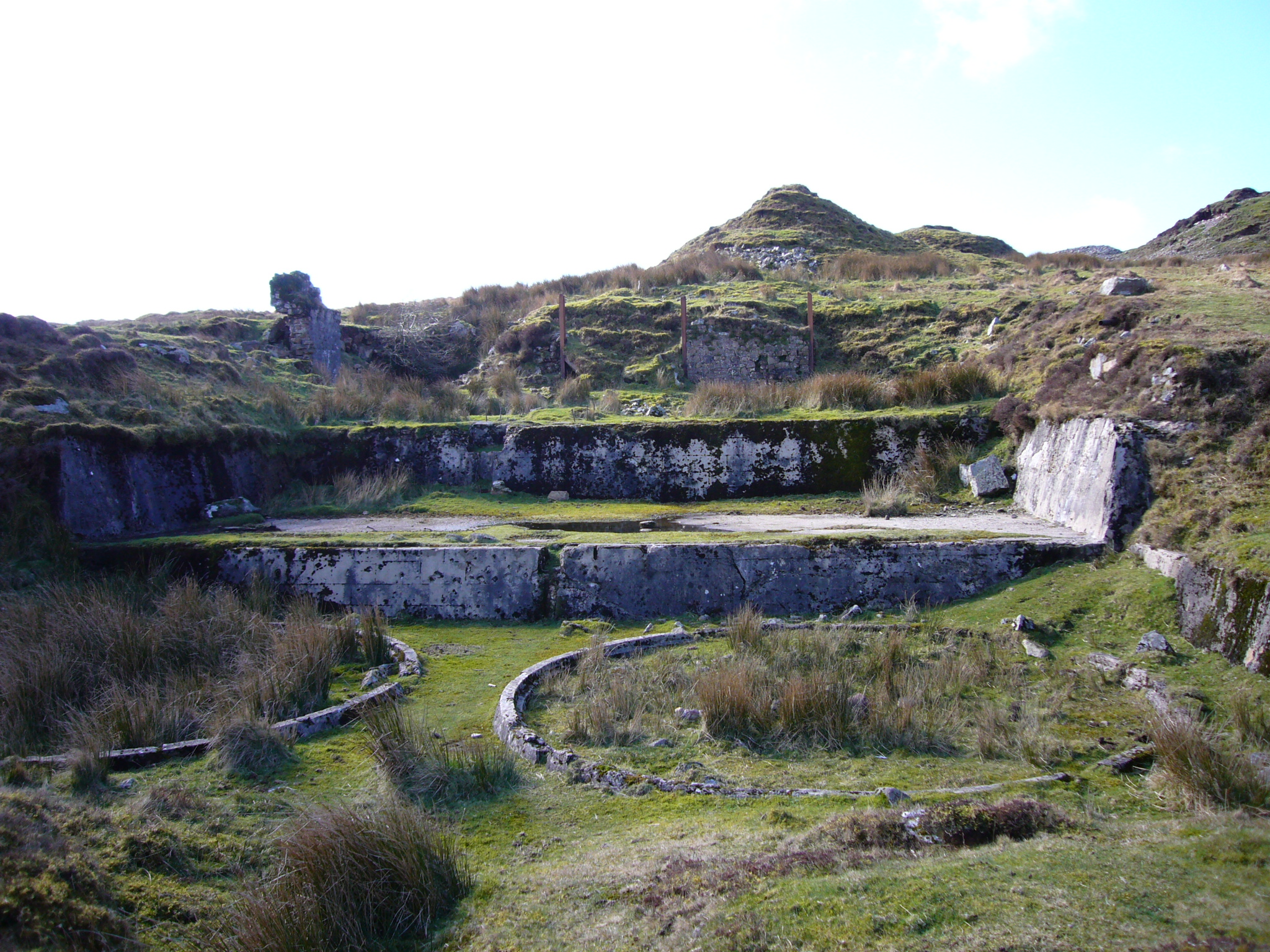
The dressing floor at Hooten Wheals, showing the remains of two early 20th century circular buddles.

From about 1848 a circular form of the buddle was introduced. The crushed ore, suspended in water was introduced onto a central cone and spread outwards over a slightly inclined conical surface. The "heads" would settle near the centre and the "tailings" at the outer edge. The main innovation of the circular buddle was a set of sweep arms, powered by a waterwheel, which rotated above the buddle and carried brushes or pieces of fabric that dragged across the surface of the settling deposits. By continuously disturbing the surface of the deposit, these stopped the formation of rivulets and allowed better separation to be obtained. The buddle would be run until the deposit built up to between 6 and 12 inches (15 and 30 cm.) deep. The deposits would then be dug out in three portions, the "middles" often being reprocessed in another buddle of a slightly different specification.

=== Smelting ===
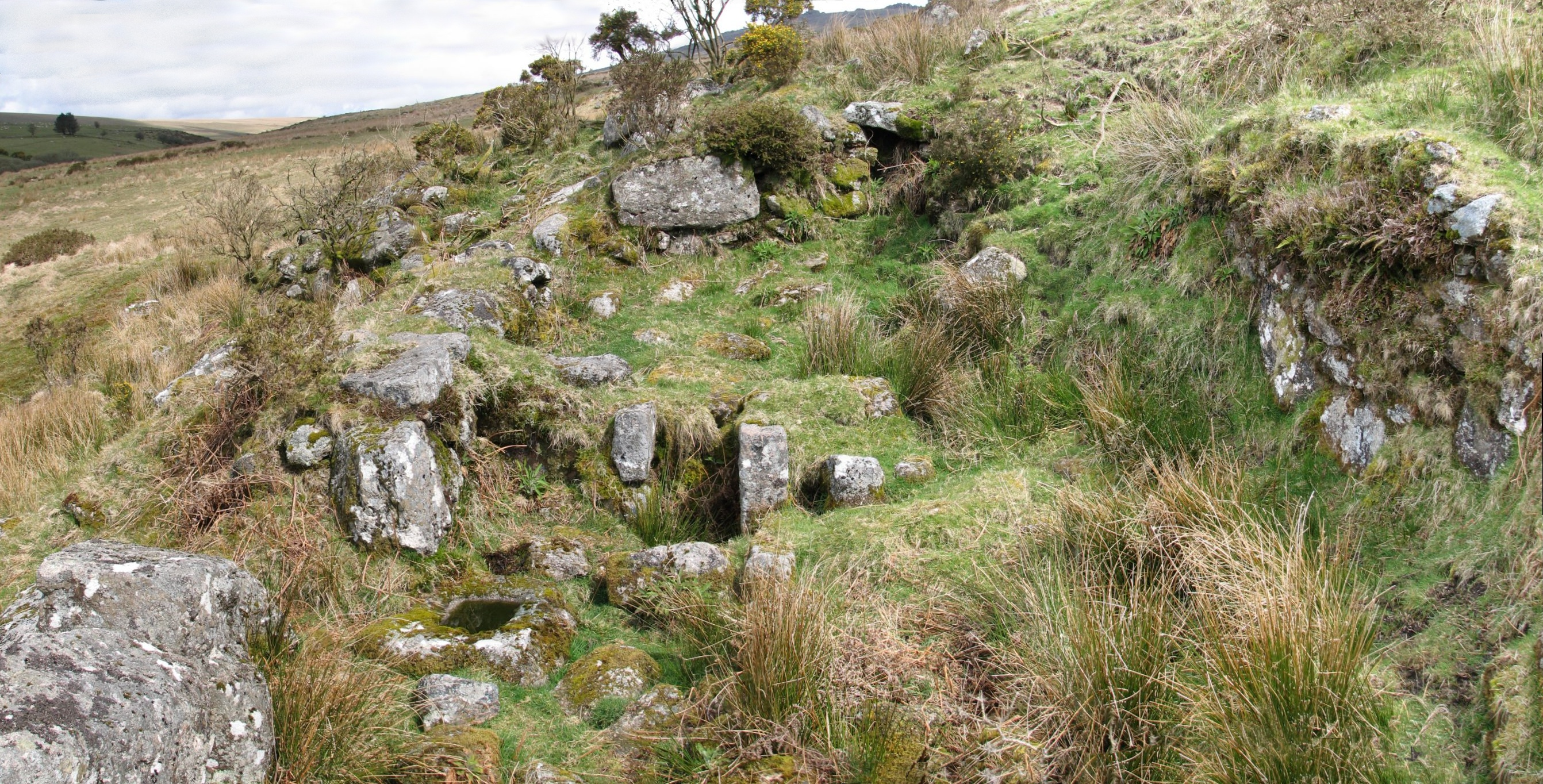
The remains of a Dartmoor blowing house, showing the furnace and mouldstone

The earliest method of liberating the metal from the tin ore necessitated two smeltings: the first was done at or near the streamworks and involved no more than a fire used to roast the ore; the second smelting was done at one of the Stannary towns. Little is known of the details of these practices, but their existence is confirmed by early documents that mention taxation of first and second smeltings. The introduction of the efficient blowing house process in around 1300 allowed the use of just one smelting. Later still reverberatory furnaces were used. Both types were in use at Eylesbarrow mine in the first half of the 19th century—the last place on Dartmoor where smelting was done.

== Consequences ==
The effects of the large scale of early tin streaming were felt on the coast, as several harbours silted up due to the amount of fine material that was washed down the rivers. Because of this, in 1532 a Stannary Court decree ordained that all rubbish should be deposited in "old Hatches, Tipittes, miry Places, or other convenient Places" away from the main streams.

The impact of mining on the Dartmoor landscape is still clear to see. Walkers on the moor will often stumble upon ruined blowing houses and mortar stones, featuring rows of semi-circular depressions, in which the ore was crushed. Many of the later mine shafts have now been filled in, but a few do still remain, fenced off to prevent walkers or animals from falling in.

== Three hares symbol ==
The three hares is a circular motif which appears in sacred sites from the Middle and Far East to the churches of south west England (where it is often referred to as the "Tinners’ Rabbits"). It occurs with the greatest frequency in the churches of the West Country of England. The motif appears in architectural wood carving, stone carving, window tracery and stained glass. In South Western England there are nearly thirty recorded examples of the Three Hares appearing on 'roof bosses' (carved wooden knobs) on the ceilings in medieval churches in Devon, (particularly Dartmoor). There is a good example of a roof boss of the Three hares at Widecombe-in-the-Moor, Dartmoor, with another in the town of Tavistock on the edge of the moor.

== See also ==
- Buddle pit
- Hydraulic mining
- Hushing
- Tin sources and trade during antiquity

== Sources ==
- Dines, H. G. (1956). The Metalliferous Mining Region of South-West England. Volume II. London: HMSO.
- Greeves, Tom (2016). Called Home - The Dartmoor Tin Miner 1830-1940. Truro: Twelveheads Press.
- Finberg, H. P. R. (1949). "The Stannary of Tavistock". Rep. Trans. Devon. Ass. Advmt Sci. 81.
- Finberg, H. P. R. (1950). "An Unrecorded Stannary Parliament". Rep. Trans. Devon. Ass. Advmt Sci. 82.
- Harris, Helen (1972). Industrial Archaeology of Dartmoor. Newton Abbot: David & Charles. ISBN 0-7153-4302-5.
- Newman, Phil (1998). The Dartmoor Tin Industry: a field guide. Newton Abbot: Chercombe Press. ISBN 0-9532708-0-7.
- Richardson, P. H. G. (1992). Mines of Dartmoor and the Tamar Valley after 1913. Sheffield: The Northern Mine Research Society. ISBN 0-901450-38-3.
- Worth, R. N. (1967). Spooner, G. M.; Russell, F. S. (eds.). Worth's Dartmoor. Newton Abbot: David & Charles. ISBN 0715351486.
