= Grey Wethers =

Prehistoric stone circles in Devon, England

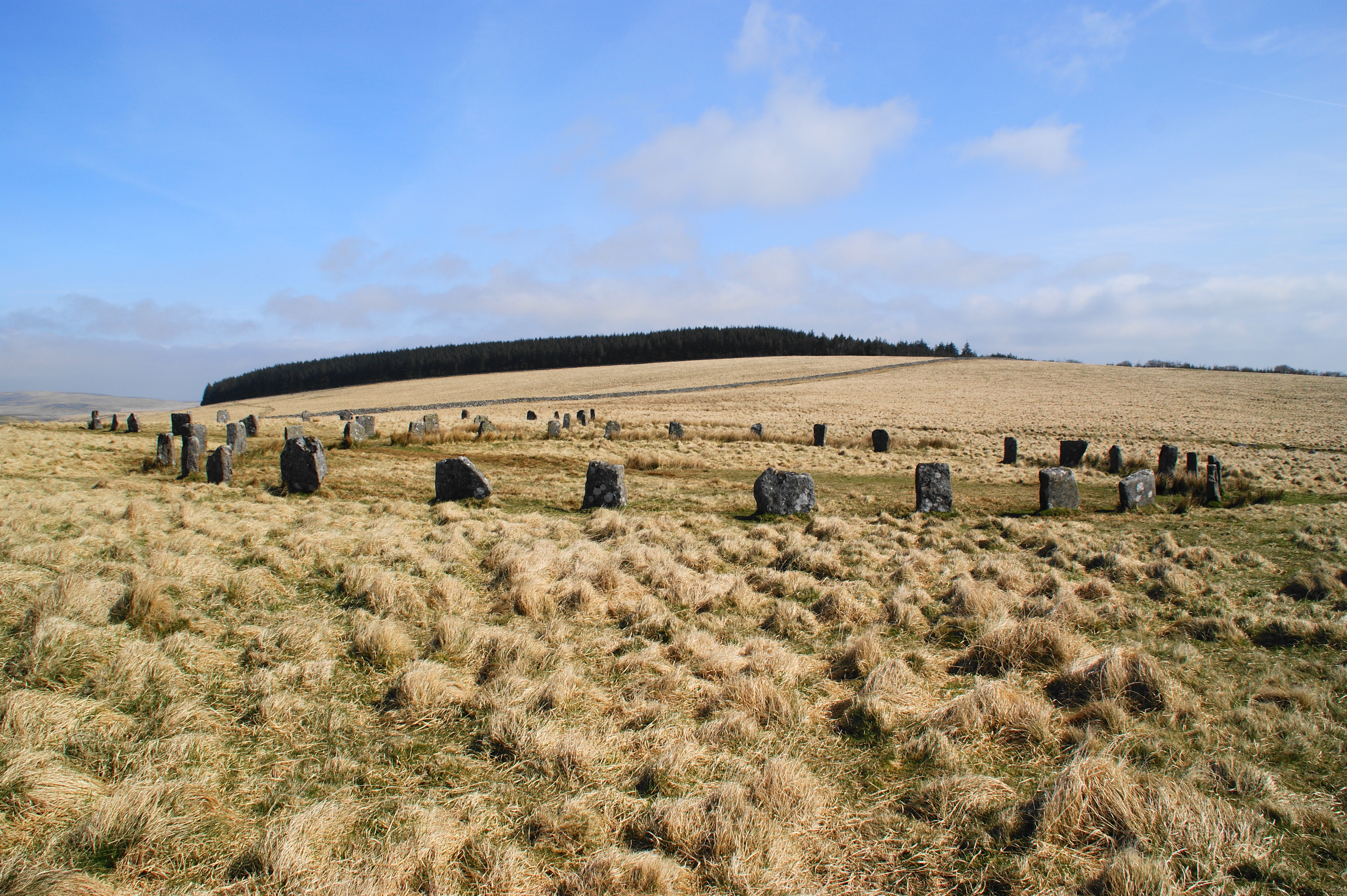
- View of the two circles from the south

- Location within Devon
- 50.63166°N 3.92577°W
- Type: Stone circles
- Periods: Bronze Age
- Location: Devon
- OS grid reference: SX639831

Grey Wethers consists of a pair of prehistoric stone circles, situated on grassy plateau to the north of Postbridge, Dartmoor, in the United Kingdom.

== Description ==
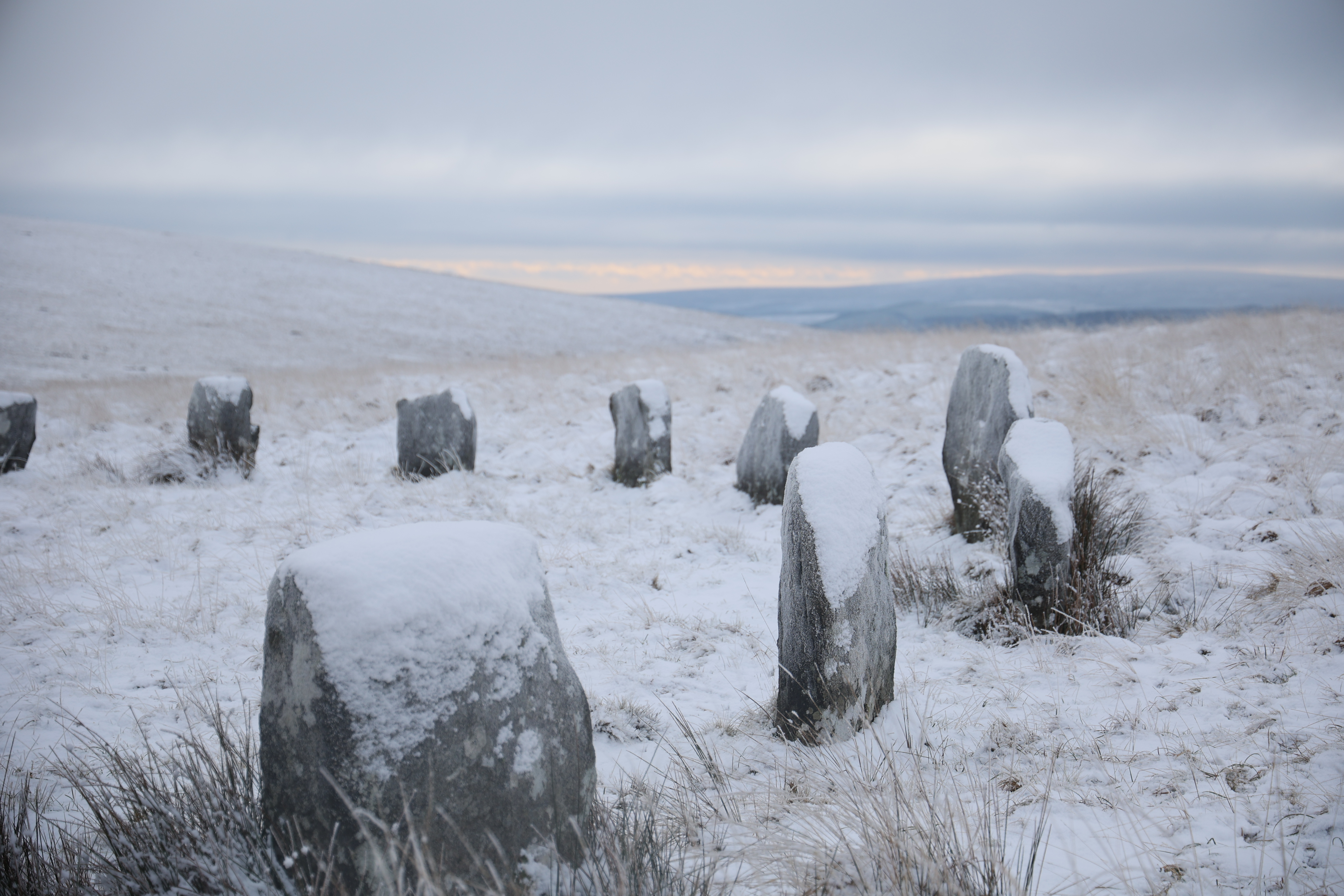
The stone circle in the snow, showing a closer view of individual stones

The circles are each approximately 33 m (108 ft) in diameter, and less than five metres apart. Their centre points are aligned almost exactly north to south. The northern circle has 20 stones remaining, while the southern has 29 – all of a relatively consistent size, mostly between 1.2 and 1.4 m (3.9 and 4.6 ft) in height.

An excavation was carried out in 1898 and a number of charcoal fragments were discovered within the circles. The circles were restored and many fallen stones re-erected in 1909.

== Folklore ==
As with many ancient Dartmoor landmarks, Grey Wethers is the subject of local folklore, explaining the origin of the name ('wether' is an Old English word meaning sheep).

One story tells of a farmer who had recently moved to Dartmoor and was foolish enough to criticise the sheep on sale at Tavistock Market. He stopped for a drink at the Warren House Inn, and helped by several pints of cider, the locals persuaded him that there was an excellent flock of high quality sheep nearby, which he would be welcome to buy. They walked off in search of them, and through the mist the farmer saw what he took to be a fine flock. He agreed to the sale, and returned to the site the following morning to find that what he had taken to be sheep were actually the stones of Grey Wethers.
