= Warren House Inn =

Public house on Dartmoor in Devon, England

Coordinates: 50°36′47″N 3°52′30″W

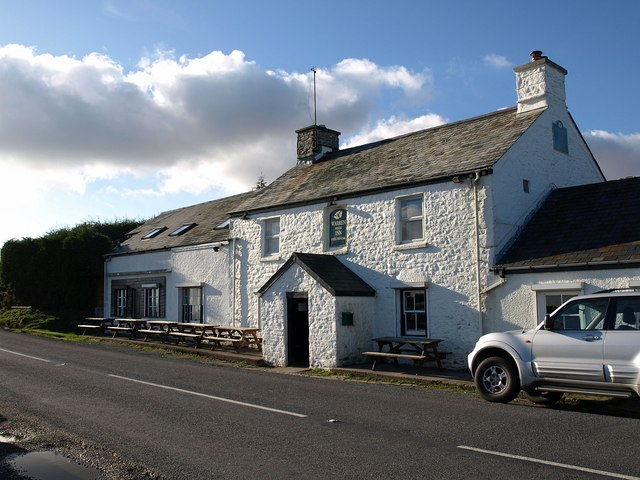
The Warren House Inn

The Warren House Inn is a remote and isolated public house in the heart of Dartmoor, Devon, England. It is the highest pub in southern England at 1,425 feet (434 m) above sea level, and is the second highest pub in all England. It is located on an ancient road across the moor, about 2 miles (3 km) north east of the village of Postbridge and has been a stopping point for travellers since the middle of the 18th century.

== History ==
In 1905 Robert Burnard wrote: "When packhorses were used on the Moreton track, New House, or as it is now called, Warren House Inn, was on the right side of the road proceeding from Postbridge towards Moreton, and it is so shown on Donne's map. This old building was burnt down some years ago and was rebuilt in 1845 by J. Wills on the other side of the present road, here it occupies the site of the ancient packhorse way."

Here is cider and beer,
Your hearts for to cheer.
And if you want meat
To make up a treat,
There are rabbits to eat.

—Inn sign in about 1831.

As Burnard said, the current building dates from 1845, but the original inn on the southern side of the packhorse track was probably built in the middle of the 18th century, certainly well before the turnpike road was created in 1792. There must have been sufficient packhorse and foot traffic because some time afterwards a small rabbit warren was established nearby to allow the inn to serve rabbit-pie with scrumpy. The earliest landlord recorded is William Tapper, in 1786.

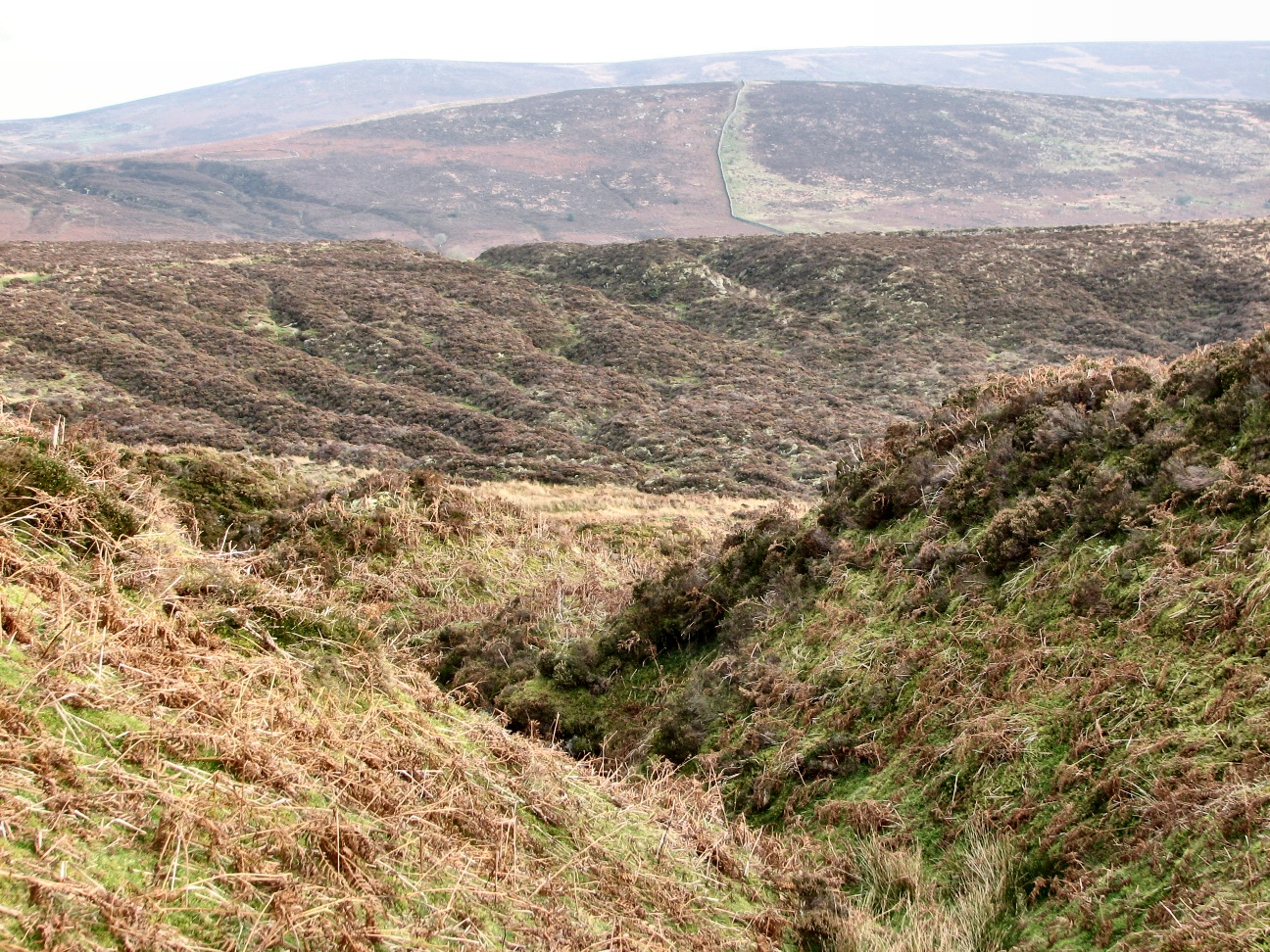
The view east from near the Inn, showing remains of open-cast tin mining

The newly rebuilt inn was first named The Moreton Inn and in 1850 it was owned by William Honey of Tavistock and the host was William Warne. Not long after, Jonas Coaker, the self-styled Dartmoor Poet who was born in Postbridge in 1801, became landlord and it was probably he who renamed the inn. In his day the inn was frequented by miners from the nearby Vitifer and Golden Dagger tin mines. Coaker later recounted two incidents that took place while he was landlord: in one he had to take to the moor when a crowd of miners helped themselves to his liquor; and on another occasion two miners got into a fight with a fatal result for one of them, but the survivor was let off with three weeks' imprisonment mostly on Coaker's evidence because he was able to show gross provocation.

== Folklore ==
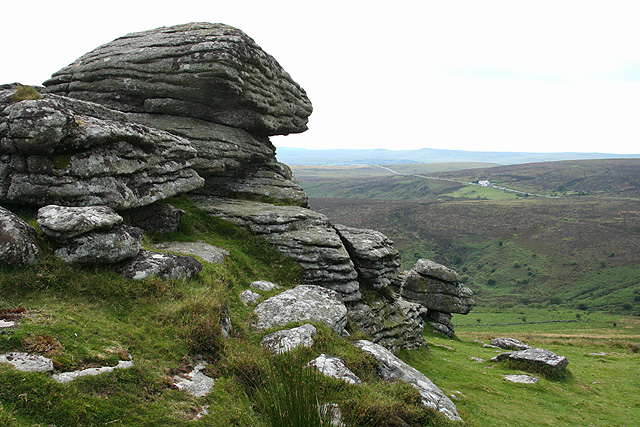
A distant view of the Inn giving an idea of its isolation

The Inn is the subject of much folklore, probably exaggerated over the generations. For example, one traveller is said to have stayed there overnight and found a body in a chest in his room. When he mentioned this to the landlord, he was told: "'tis only fayther! … the snaw being so thick, and making the roads so cledgey-like, when old fayther died, two weeks agon, we couldn't carry un to Tavistock to bury un; and so mother put un in the old box, and salted un in…"

Another relates to a visitor who was persuaded to buy a flock of sheep, after consuming copious quantities of cider. The following morning, he discovered that the "flock" that he had been shown by the locals that night was actually the prehistoric stone circles of Grey Wethers.

The fire in the hearth, it is rumoured, has never been allowed to go out and has itself become part of the folklore of the inn. It is said that when the inn was rebuilt, the glowing embers of the fire were carried across the road on a shovel to the new hearth.

== See also ==
- The Great Thunderstorm, Widecombe
- Dartmoor tin-mining
