= Jay's Grave =

18th century landmark on Dartmoor, Devon, South-West England

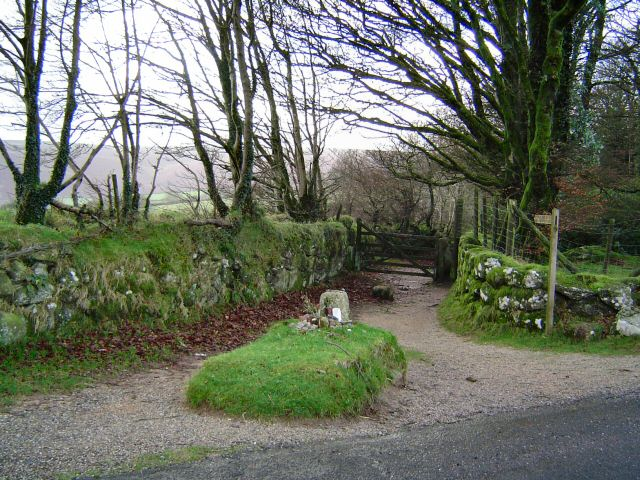
- Interactive map of Jay's Grave
- 50.60509°N 3.79269°W
- Type: Suicide's grave
- Location: Near Manaton, Dartmoor
- Region: Devon, England

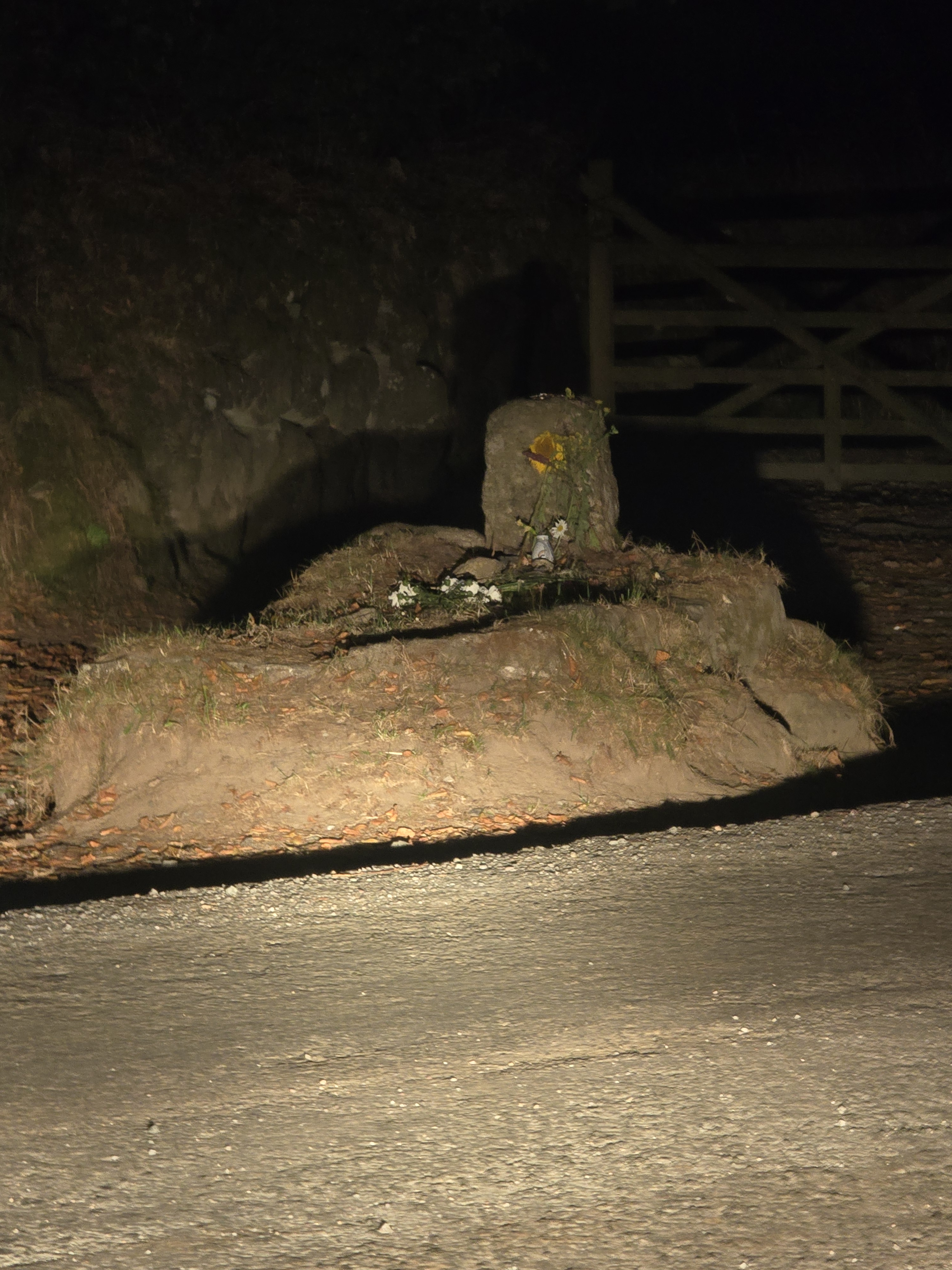
Jay's Grave under the full-beam headlights of a car at night in 2026

Jay's Grave (or Kitty Jay's Grave) is supposedly the last resting place of a suicide victim who is thought to have died in the late 18th century and denied burial within consecrated ground, a standard practice for suicide victims at the time. It has become a well-known landmark on Dartmoor, Devon, in South-West England, and is the subject of local folklore, and several ghost stories.

The small burial mound is at the side of a minor road, about 1 mile (1.6 km) north west of Hound Tor, at the entrance to a green lane that leads to Natsworthy. Fresh flowers are regularly placed on the grave, although no one admits to putting them there.

== Folklore ==
Since it was first set down in the late 19th century, the story attached to the grave has changed and has been greatly embellished.

=== Early references ===
An early newspaper account of the discovery of the grave appears on page 5 of the North Devon Journal for 23 January 1851, under "County Intelligence":

In the parish of Manaton, near Widdecombe on the moor while some men in the employ of James Bryant, Esq., of Prospect, at his seat, Hedge Barton, were removing some accumulations of way soil, a few days since, they discovered what appeared to be a grave. On further investigation, they found the skeleton of a body, which proved from enquiry to be the remains of Ann Jay, a woman who hanged herself some three generations since in a barn at a place called Forder, and was buried at Four Cross Lane, according to the custom of that enlightened age.

In 1876 Robert Dymond edited and published a book entitled "Things Old and New" Concerning the Parish of Widecombe-in-the-Moor and its Neighbourhood which contains the following:

A simple mound and unwrought headstone by the roadside marks the site of a more modern grave. A poor old woman, called Kay, having hanged herself, was laid here under cross roads without the rites of Christian burial. There are many such graves of suicides hereabouts, and the country folk shudder as they pass the whisht spots by night.

In Volume 1 of the Western Antiquary, dated October 1881, one F. B. Doveton asked for further details of a grave that he had noted by the side of the road to Hey Tor. Doveton's guide had told him that it

was called "Jay's Grave" and was that of a young woman who had hanged herself years ago in a barn in Manaton, the bones being subsequently buried here.

In a reply to Doveton's enquiry that was published later the same month, P. F. S. Amery quoted the above passage from Dymond and added some extra information:

This one is about a quarter of a mile from the Swallaton Gate, on the road leading from Ashburton to Chagford; it is not now a cross road, but a path strikes across the main road, and leads between the farms of Hedge Barton and Heytree into the valley of Widecombe. The grave is known as Betty Kay's, and about twenty years ago, the late Mr. James Bryant, the owner of the property, opened the little mound to verify the local tradition, and discovered the bones, which he placed in a coffin, and reinterred in the same grave with a head and foot stone properly set up.

Twenty years later, in the first volume of Devon Notes and Queries (1900–01), W. H. Thornton, who identified himself as the rector of North Bovey, asked:

What were the circumstances which attended the death of the poor girl who occupies, or occupied, Jay's grave, at the point where the Heatree Common lane joins the Chagford and Ashburton road? Local tradition declares that she was a maidservant at Manaton Ford farmhouse, and that she hanged herself, and was buried at night on the down above the house. It is also asserted that the grave has been opened and no remains found. They had either been previously removed by friends, or the burial must have taken place long ago. The grave is still distinct, and the mound of earth over it is decently kept. Can anyone assign a date to the tragedy?

In reply to this enquiry P. F. S. Amery, who was by now one of the editors of Devon Notes and Queries, wrote:

...Jay’s Grave, which is by the side of the Ashburton and Chagford road, where the Heytree and Hedge Barton Estates meet. A workman of mine, aged 74, informs us that about forty years ago [...] he was in the employ of Mr. James Bryant, of Hedge Barton, Manaton, when he remembers Jay’s Grave being opened, in which a young unmarried woman who had hung herself in Cannon Farm outbuildings, which is situated between Forder and Torhill, was said to have been buried, but no one then living at Manaton could remember the occurrence. The grave was opened by order of Mr. James Bryant in the presence of his son-in-law, Mr. J. W. Sparrow, M.R.C.S. Bones were found, examined, and declared to be those of a female. The skull was taken to Hedge Barton, but was afterwards placed with the bones in a box and re-interred in the old grave, a small mound raised with head and foot stones erected at either end. Such is the present appearance of the grave.

In a map from 1905, the grave appears as Jane's Grave.

In 1909, William Crossing, in his Guide to Dartmoor repeated Amery's report, though he named the suicide as "Kitty Jay, as she used to be spoken of", and amended the location of the incident to "Canna, a farm not far from the foot of East Down".

The Dartmoor author Beatrice Chase wrote about the legend in her 1914 novel The Heart of the Moor, and claimed in a prefixed publisher's note that the events it describes are true. In the novel she says:

[...] near a plantation a little off the roadside, upon a turfy bank, I found the semblance of a rude grave. It was a narrow ridge, raised above the surrounding turf, with irregular stones along its edges, and at the head an upright hunk of granite. [...] Going nearer I found that unknown hands had placed upon it a rough cross of ducky flowers, which lay limp and dying in the sunshine.

Because there is no inscription on the grave she sets out to discover whose it might be. After asking several locals and searching maps and guidebooks without success, she eventually finds that "Granny Caunter" knows the story:

"Yes, miss, it be a grave sure 'nough," [...] " J's grave 'tis called. No, I can't tell 'ee how 'tis spelt for I never couldn't spell. Mary Jay was the poor maid's name. I heard my mother tell of it, when I was a li'l maid. It happened when her was a li'l maid herself. Her could just mind hearing tell of it." [...] "'Tis a suicide's grave, miss." [...] "Her was an orphan from the workhouse, 'prenticed to Barracott Farm between Manaton and Heatree. One day, when her was quite young, her tooked a rope and went to the barn there on the Manaton Road, and hanged herself from a beam. Her was quite dead when the farmer found her." [...] "Us reckoned 'twas the same old story, miss—a young man, who wadn't no gude to her, poor maid."

Patricia Milton, writing in 2006, points out that Chase was being disingenuous in her novel, because as early as 1905 the grave was being mentioned in guidebooks, and coach drivers were already pointing it out to tourists.

=== Later versions ===
By 1965 Jay's Grave had become a major Dartmoor attraction, with tourist coaches stopping there while the driver/guide related their own version of the story. The mysterious appearance of fresh flowers upon the grave was always mentioned.

Recent versions of the legend include embellishments such as the orphaned baby being taken into the Poor House in Newton Abbot or Wolborough where she was given the name Mary Jay. She now sometimes acquires the name Kitty after being sent to Canna Farm as a teenage apprentice. In one version of the tale, she is raped by a local farmhand. In another version, she finds romance with the farmer's son. Either way, she becomes pregnant which results in her being thrown out of the farm and left with a reputation. Such is her shame and despair that she hangs herself in a barn, or perhaps from the great kitchen fireplace lintel, or else she drowns herself in a shallow pool.

It is now said that the three local parishes of Widecombe-in-the-Moor, North Bovey and Manaton all refused to bury her body within consecrated ground, so she was buried at a crossroads, which was standard practice for suicide victims at the time. It is also often said that this crossroads is at the point where the three parishes met, though the Ordnance Survey map confirms that this is not the case.

== The grave ==
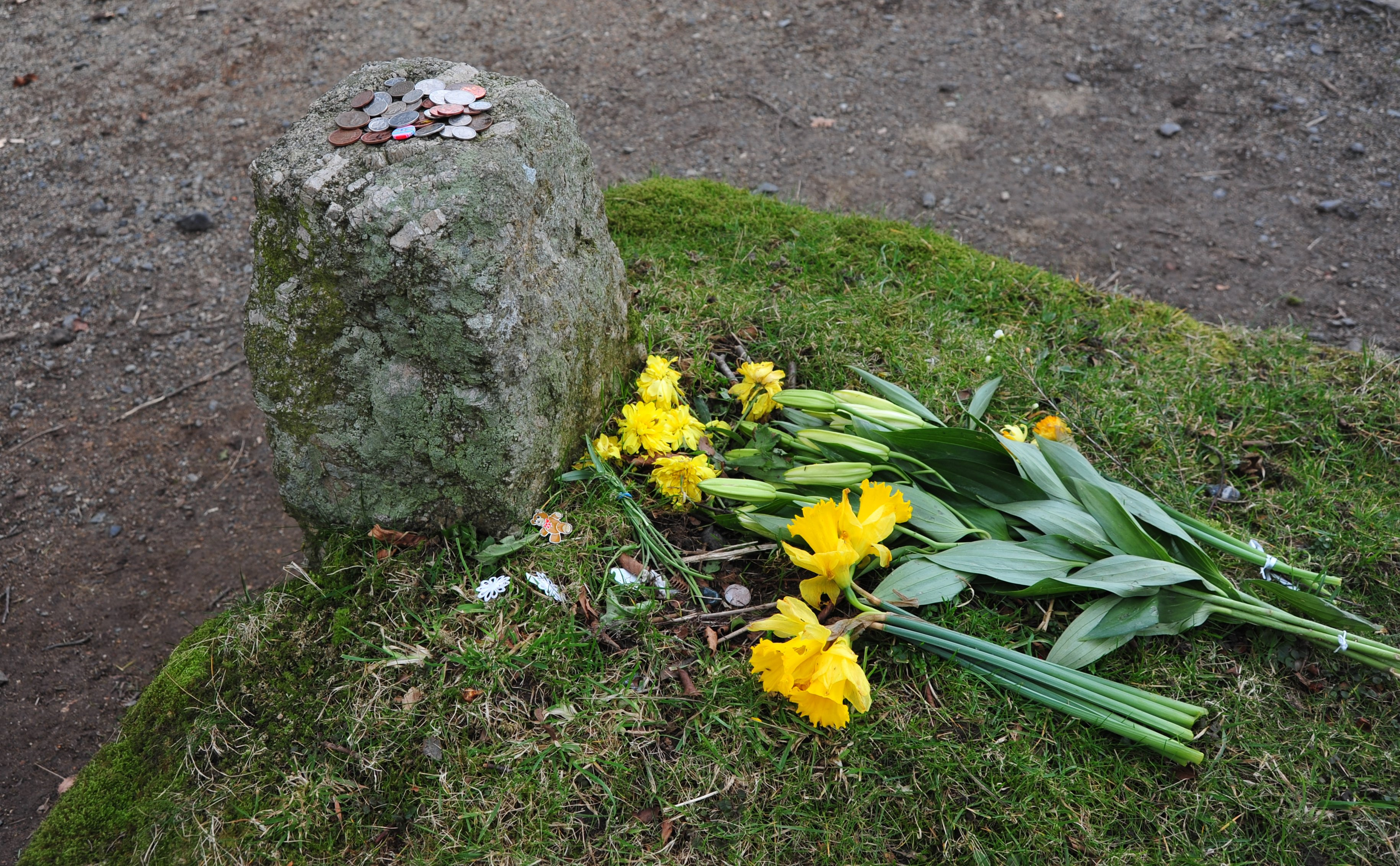
A typical collection of flowers, coins and other votive offerings

There are always fresh flowers on the grave, the placement of which is the subject of local folklore – some claim they are placed there by pixies, but it is known that the author Beatrice Chase was one person who did this, before her death in 1955. By 2007 the placing of flowers had expanded into all sorts of votive offerings: coins, candles, shells, small crosses and toys, for instance.

Motorists, passing at night, claim to have glimpsed ghostly figures in their headlights, others report seeing a dark, hooded figure kneeling there.

== Notable uses of the story ==
Jay's Grave was the inspiration for John Galsworthy's short story The Apple Tree, written in 1916.

In the late 1960s, knowledge of the legend prompted Martin Turner of local rock band the Empty Vessels to visit the grave with his brother Glenn, late at night after a gig. Some years later, by then a founder member of Wishbone Ash, Turner used the experience to write the lyrics to a song called "Lady Jay" which appears on the band's 1974 album There's the Rub. "I thought it was tragic, yet very romantic," he later said.

David Rudkin wrote an episode inspired by the tale entitled The Living Grave for the BBC 2 TV anthology series Leap in the Dark, broadcast in 1980. It also inspired Seth Lakeman to write his 2004 song and album, both called Kitty Jay. Sir Arthur Conan Doyle visited the nearby house, Heatree with his friend, Bertram Fletcher Robinson, and this is said to have been inspired by the location of the house and its proximity to Jay's Grave, Bowerman's Nose, Hound Tor and Grimspound to write The Hound of the Baskervilles.
