= Dartmoor Commons Act 1985 =

Act of the Parliament of the United Kingdom

- Act of Parliament
- Parliament of the United Kingdom
- Long title: An Act to constitute the Dartmoor Commoners' Council for the maintenance of and the promotion of proper standards of livestock husbandry on the commons in and about the Dartmoor National Park; to regulate public access to the commons; to confer powers on that Council and on the county council of Devon with reference to those commons; and for connected and other purposes.
- Citation: 1985 c. xxxvii
- Territorial extent: Dartmoor

Dates
- Royal assent: 30 October 1985

Text of statute as originally enacted

Text of the Dartmoor Commons Act 1985 as in force today (including any amendments) within the United Kingdom, from legislation.gov.uk.

The Dartmoor Commons Act 1985 (c. xxxvii) is an act of the Parliament of the United Kingdom that legislates for access to land within Dartmoor, an upland area in southern Devon, South West England.

The act established the Dartmoor Commoners' Council, a statutory body responsible for regulation of livestock husbandry on and public access to the commons, and delimits its regulatory and enforcement powers.

The act was granted royal assent on 30 October 1985.

== Public access ==
Section 10 of the act grants the general public "a right of access to the commons on foot and on horseback for the purpose of open-air recreation". The exact nature of the meaning of "open-air recreation" has been disputed, specifically in regard to wild camping, with a High Court ruling in January 2023 prohibiting the practice.

Following a Court of Appeal judgment in July 2023, it was established that camping was an activity covered by the act, permitting legal wild camping on Dartmoor.

The ruling, permitting camping, was upheld by the Supreme Court in May 2025.

== See also ==
- National Parks and Access to the Countryside Act 1949
- Dartmoor National Park Authority
- Devon County Council
- Freedom to roam
