= Dartmoor =

National park in South West England

Dartmoor National Park
- IUCN category V (protected landscape/seascape)
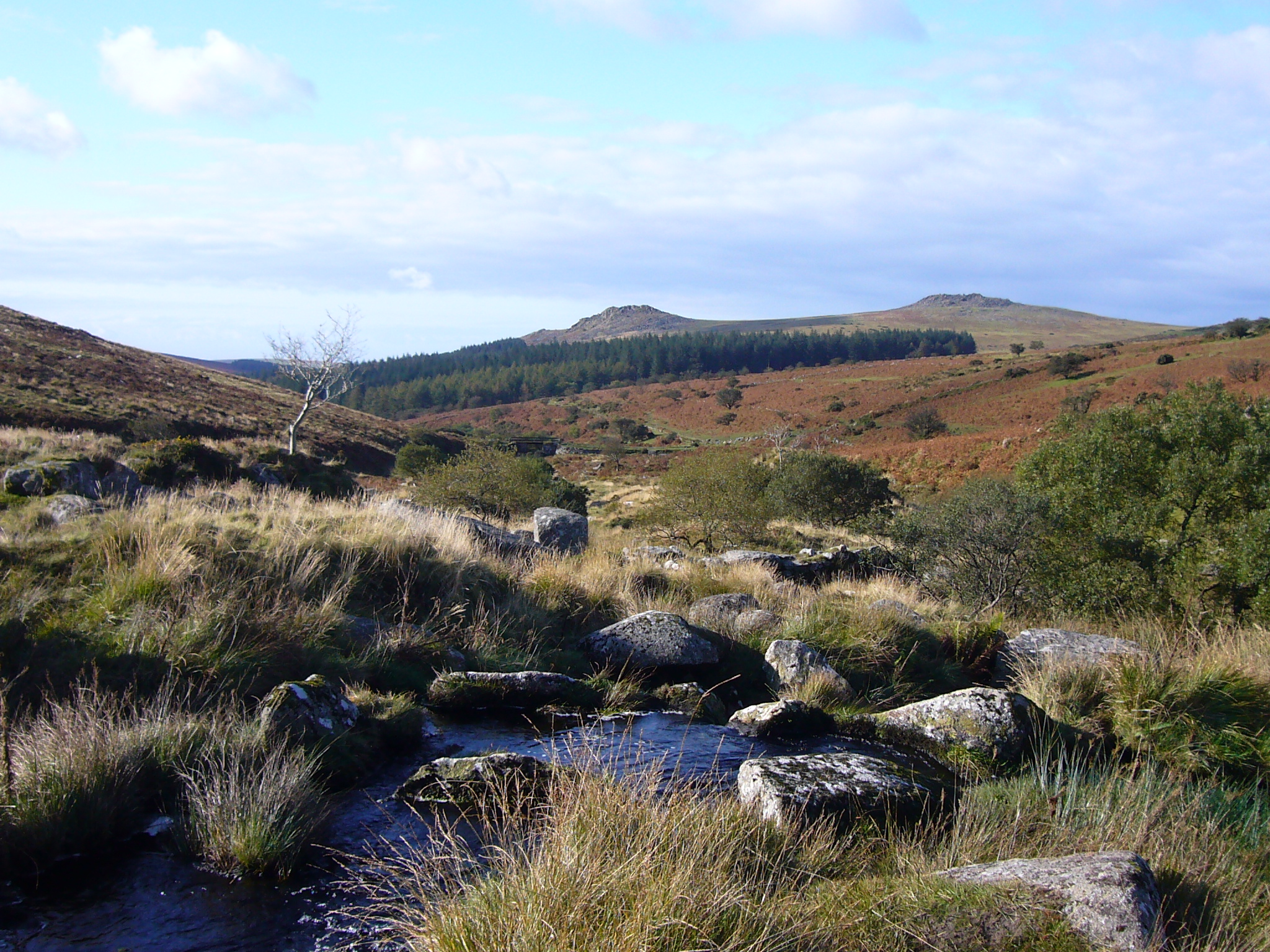
- View down the River Meavy towards Leather Tor and Sharpitor

- Location: United Kingdom (South West England)
- Coordinates: 50°34′N 4°0′W
- Area: 954 km^{2} (368 sq mi)
- Established: 1951
- Visitors: 10.98m
- Governing body: Dartmoor National Park Authority
- Website: www.dartmoor.gov.uk

Dartmoor is an upland area in southern Devon, South West England. The moorland and surrounding land has been protected by National Park status since 1951. Dartmoor National Park covers 954 km^{2} (368 sq mi).

The granite that forms the uplands dates from the Carboniferous Period of geological history. The landscape consists of moorland capped with many exposed granite hilltops known as tors, providing habitats for wildlife. The highest point is High Willhays, 621 m (2,037 ft) above sea level. The entire area is rich in antiquities and archaeological artefacts.

Dartmoor National Park is managed by the Dartmoor National Park Authority, whose 22 members are drawn from Devon County Council, local district councils and Government. The Dartmoor Commoners' Council exists to create and enforce regulations regarding commoners' rights.

Parts of Dartmoor have been used as military firing ranges for over 200 years. The public is granted extensive land access rights on Dartmoor (including restricted access to the firing ranges) and it is a popular tourist destination.

== Physical geography ==
=== Geology ===
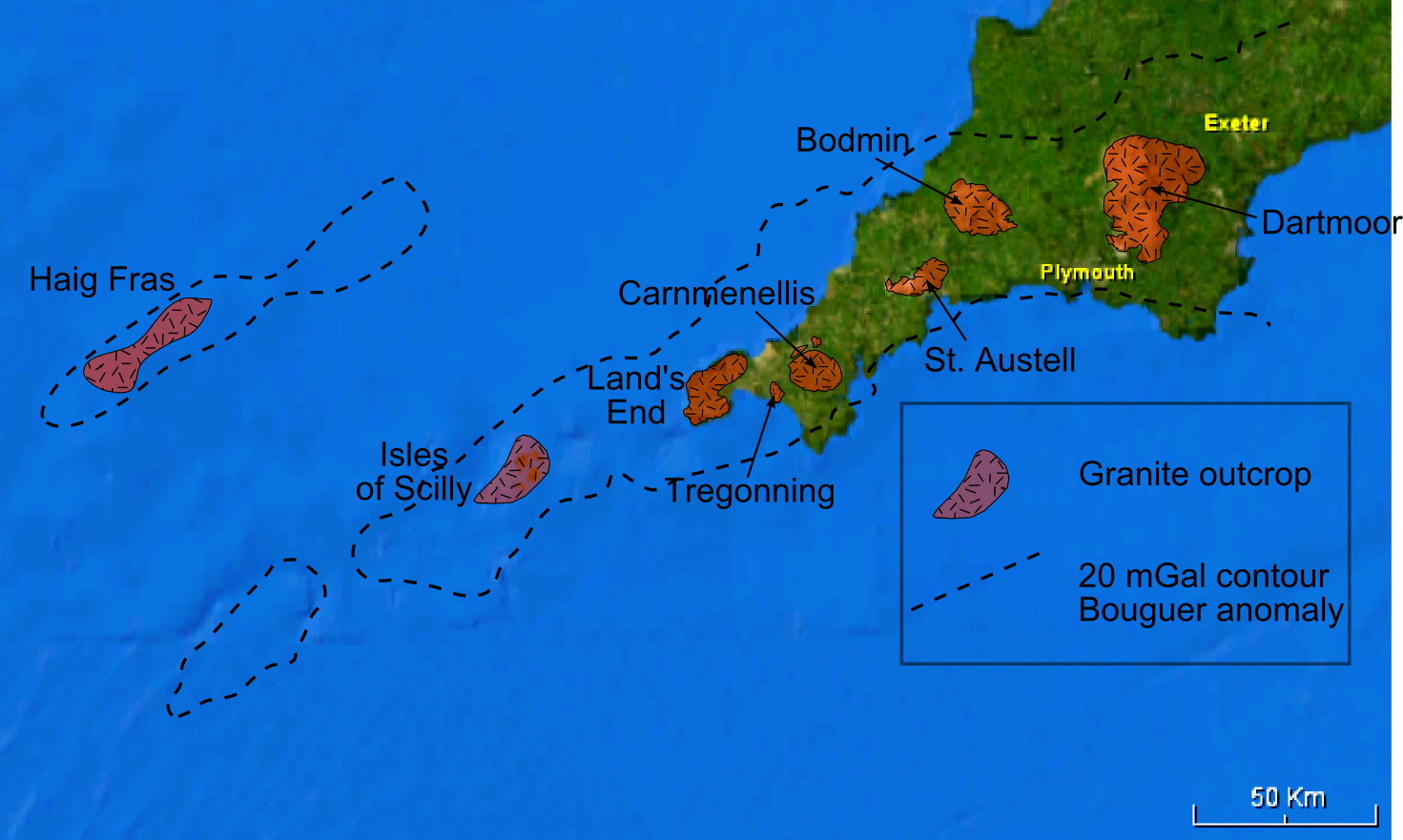
Map showing the main granite outcrops of the Cornubian batholith in southwest England and the gravity anomaly associated with it

Dartmoor includes the largest area of granite in Britain, with about 625 km^{2} (241 mi^{2}) at the surface, though most of it is under superficial peat deposits. The granite (or more specifically adamellite) was intruded at depth as a pluton into the surrounding sedimentary rocks during the Carboniferous period, probably about 309 million years ago. It is generally accepted that the present surface is not far below the original top of the pluton; evidence for this includes partly digested shale xenoliths, contamination of the granite and the existence of two patches of altered sedimentary rock on top of the granite. A considerable gravity anomaly is associated with the Dartmoor pluton as with other such plutons. Measurement of the anomaly has helped to determine the likely shape and extent of the rock mass at depth.

=== Tors ===
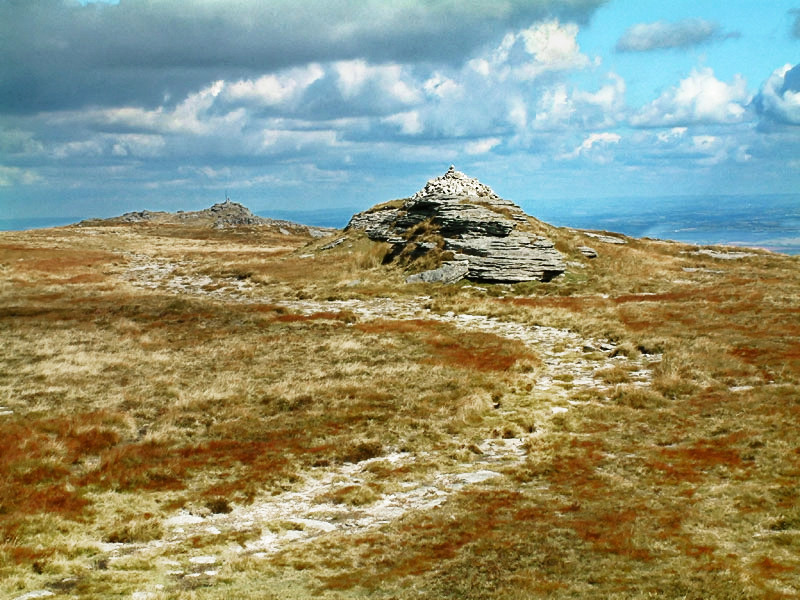
High Willhays with Yes Tor behind

Dartmoor is known for its tors – hills topped with outcrops of bedrock, which in granite country such as this are usually rounded boulder-like formations. Each tor represents a mass of granite left standing where deep chemical weathering removed the surrounding, more heavily jointed rock. More than 160 of the hills of Dartmoor have the word tor in their name but quite a number do not. However, this does not appear to relate to whether or not there is an outcrop of rock on their summit. The tors are the focus of an annual event known as the Ten Tors Challenge, when around 2,400 people aged between 14 and 19 walk for distances of 35, 45 or 55 mi (56, 72 or 89 km) between ten tors on many different routes.

The highest points on Dartmoor are on the northern moor: High Willhays, 621 m (2,037 ft), (grid reference SX 580892) and Yes Tor, 619 m (2,031 ft), (grid reference SX 581901). The highest points on the southern moor are Ryder's Hill, 515 m (1,690 ft), (grid reference SX 660690), Snowdon 495 m (1,624 ft), (grid reference SX 668684), and an unnamed point, 493 m (1,617 ft) at (grid reference SX 603645), between Langcombe Hill and Shell Top. The best-known tor on Dartmoor is Haytor (called Hey Tor by William Crossing), 457 m (1,499 ft), (grid reference SX 757771). For a more complete list see List of Dartmoor tors and hills.

=== Rivers ===
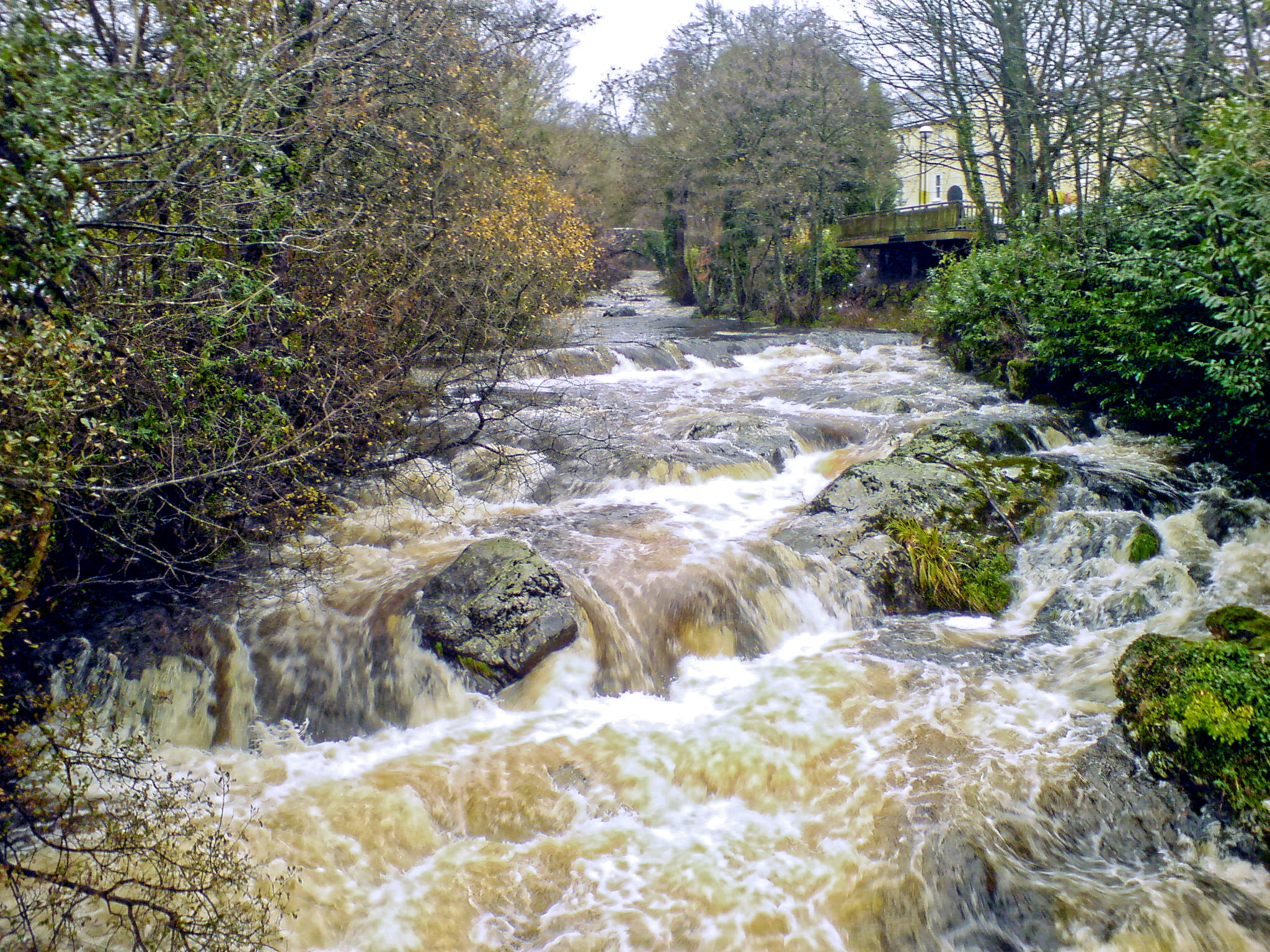
River Erme at Ivybridge

The high ground of Dartmoor forms the catchment area for many of Devon's rivers. As well as shaping the landscape, these have traditionally provided a source of power for moor industries such as tin mining and quarrying.

The moor takes its name from the River Dart, which starts as the East Dart and West Dart and then becomes a single river at Dartmeet. It leaves the moor at Buckfastleigh, flowing through Totnes below where it opens up into a long ria, reaching the sea at Dartmouth. Other rivers flowing from Dartmoor include the Teign, the Taw, the Tavy, the Avon, and the Lyd.

Some of the rivers in Dartmoor have been dammed to create reservoirs for drinking water, including the River Avon and the South Teign River (Fernworthy Reservoir).

=== Bogs ===
Much more rain falls on Dartmoor than in the surrounding lowlands. As much of the national park is covered in thick layers of peat (decaying vegetation), the rain is usually absorbed quickly and distributed slowly, so the moor is rarely dry. In areas where water accumulates, dangerous bogs or mires can result. Some of these, topped with bright green moss, are known to locals as "feather beds" or "quakers", because they can shift (or 'quake') beneath a person's feet. Quakers result from sphagnum moss growing over the water that accumulates in the hollows in the granite.

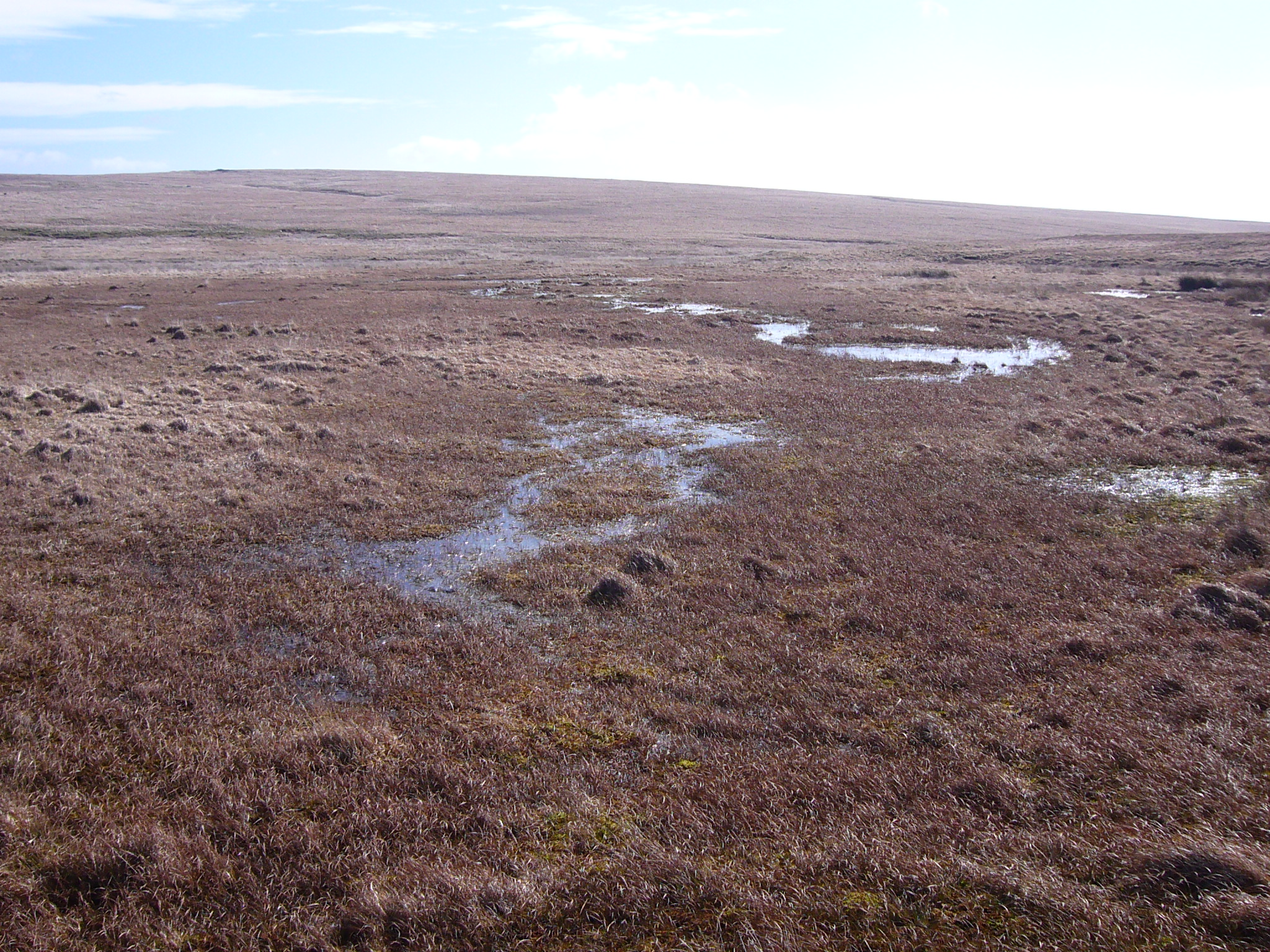
Aune Mire, the source of the River Avon

The vegetation of the bogs depends on the type and location. Blanket bog, which forms on the highest land where the rainfall exceeds 2,000 millimetres (79 in) a year, consists mainly of cotton-grass (eriophorum species), sedges (carex and rhynchospora), Bog Asphodel and Common Tormentil, with sphagnum thriving in the wettest patches. The valley bogs have lush growth of rushes, with sphagnum, cross-leaved heath, sundews and several other species.

Some of the bogs on Dartmoor have achieved notoriety. Fox Tor Mires was supposedly the inspiration for Great Grimpen Mire in Conan Doyle's novel The Hound of the Baskervilles, although there is a waymarked footpath across it. Sabine Baring-Gould, in his Book of Dartmoor (1900) related the story of a man who was making his way through Aune Mire at the head of the River Avon when he came upon a top-hat brim down on the surface of the mire. He kicked it, whereupon a voice called out: "What be you a-doin' to my 'at?" The man replied, "Be there now a chap under'n?" "Ees, I reckon", was the reply, "and a hoss under me likewise".

The South West Peatland Project aims to restore around 300 hectares (740 acres) of Dartmoor's peatland through collaboration with the national park authority. Preserving these peatlands will help mitigate climate change through sequestering carbon from the atmosphere. More generally, Dartmoor aims to be carbon negative by 2045.

== Climate ==
Along with the rest of South West England, Dartmoor has a temperate climate, which is generally milder than locations at similar height in the rest of England. At Princetown, near the centre of the moor at a height of 453 metres (1,486 ft), January and February are the coldest months with mean minimum temperatures around 1 °C (34 °F). July and August are the warmest months with mean daily maxima not reaching 18 °C (64 °F). Compared with Teignmouth, which is on the coast about 22 miles (35 km) to the east, the average maximum and minimum temperatures are 3.0 °C (5.4 °F) and 2.6 °C (4.7 °F) lower respectively, and frost is at least five times as frequent. On the highest ground, in the north of the moor, the growing season is less than 175 days – this contrasts with some 300 days along most of the south coast of the county.

Rainfall tends to be associated with Atlantic depressions or with convection. In summer, convection caused by solar surface heating sometimes forms shower clouds and a large proportion of rainfall comes from showers and thunderstorms at this time of year. The wettest months are November and December and on the highest parts of the moor the average annual total rainfall is over 2,000 millimetres (79 in). This compares with less than 800 millimetres (31 in) in the lower land to the east around the Exe Estuary, which is in the rain shadow of the moor. Due to the influence of the Gulf Stream snowfall is not common, though due to its high altitude it is more vulnerable to snowfall than surrounding regions.

Between 1961 and 1990 Met Office data shows that there was an average of 20 days when snow fell on the moor, and over 40 days a year with hail, which is as high as anywhere else in the country. This results when cold polar maritime air that has travelled over a large expanse of warmer ocean is forced to rise over high country.

When average temperatures at Princetown between 1961 and 2000 are compared, the average annual temperature in the decade 1990–2000 was up by 0.2 °C (0.4 °F) and the late winter temperature increased by 0.5 °C (0.9 °F).

== Wildlife ==
Because of Dartmoor's height and granite geology, it experiences strong winds and has acidic soils. In consequence it has been subject to very little intensive farming, and all these factors combine to form the basis of the important ecosystems found here. The landscape is one of granite with peat bogs overlying it. While the moors topped with granite tors are the most iconic part of Dartmoor's landscape, only about half of Dartmoor is actually moorland. Equally important for wildlife are the blanket bogs, upland heaths and the oak woodlands, which are all of global importance. Dartmoor is a Special Area of Conservation (SAC) with four habitats (Northern Atlantic wet heaths with Erica tetralix; European dry heaths; Blanket bogs and Old sessile oak woods with Ilex and Blechnum in the British Isles) being listed as primary reasons for the selection of Dartmoor as a SAC. In addition the area has a population of the southern damselfly, which is also a primary reason for its selection along with populations of Atlantic salmon and otter being qualifying reasons.

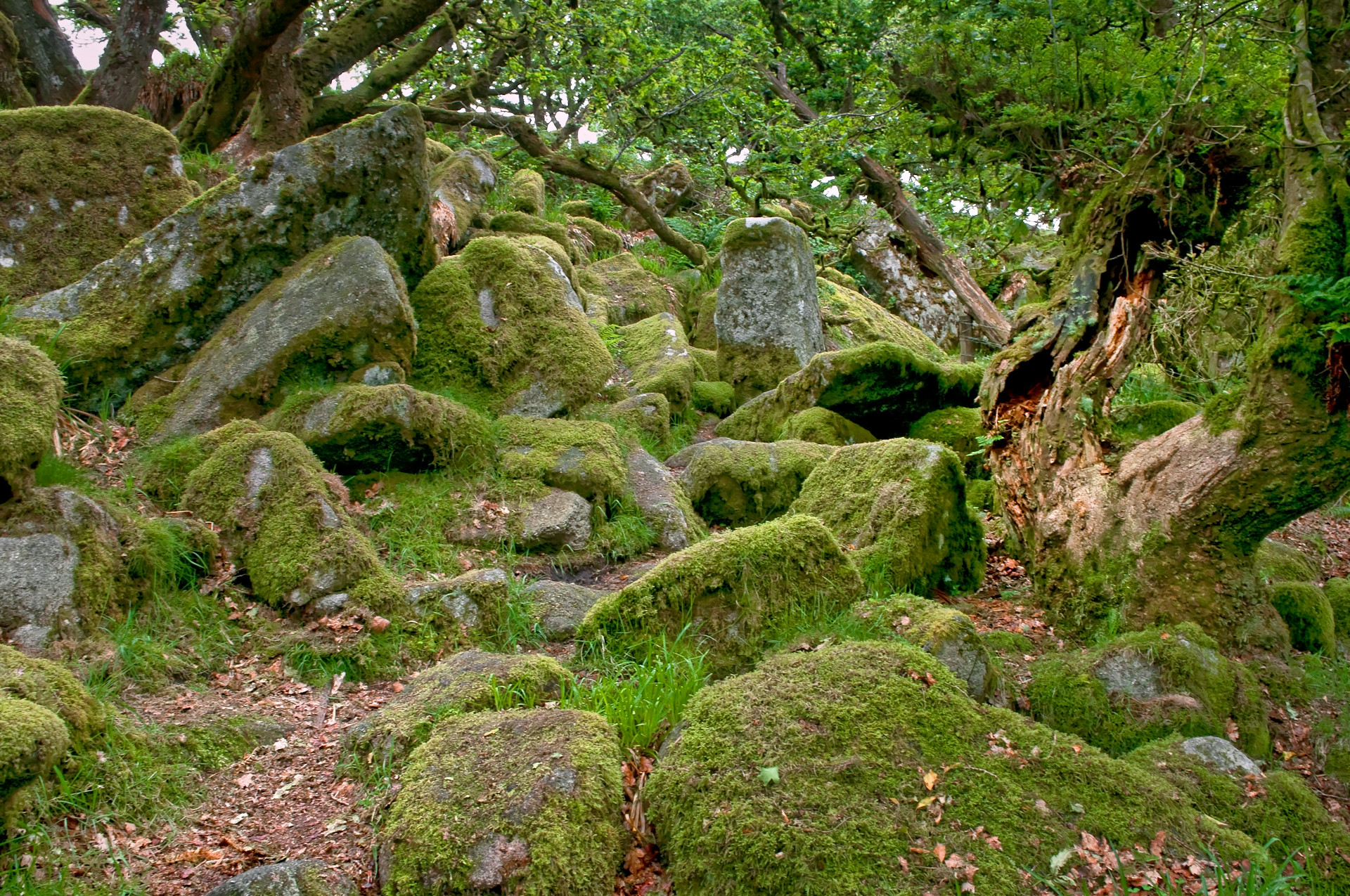
Inside Wistman's Wood in summer

Wistman's Wood is one of the old sessile oak woods that contribute to the listing of Dartmoor as a SAC and is possibly a surviving fragment from the earliest Neolithic woodland clearances. It is home to exceptional epiphytic mosses, liverworts and lichens. Nearly 50 species of moss and liverwort are found in the wood along with 120 types of lichen, including Smith's horsehair lichen, speckled sea-storm lichen and pendulous wing-moss. Over 60 species of lichens grow on the exposed surfaces of the granite tors, including granite-speck rim-lichen, purple rock lichen, brown cobblestone lichen and goldspot lichen and many rare lichen grow on rocks exposed by mining that are rich in heavy metals. On the upland heaths heather (ling) and bell heather are common along with western gorse. In dry grassy areas tormentil, heath bedstraw and heath milkwort are all common. Cross-leaved heath and purple moor grass grow in wetter spots and in the boggy areas many different species of sphagnum and other mosses can be found, along with liverworts, Hare's-tail Cotton-grass, round-leaved sundew and bog asphodel, and in the valley bottoms, many different sedges, bogbean and pale butterwort all grow.

A large variety of bird species can be found on Dartmoor including ones that have declined elsewhere in the UK, such as skylark and common snipe; some are even rare nationally, such as the ring ouzel and the cuckoo. There are internationally important populations of meadow pipit and stonechat. Woodland birds include a number of migrant species, like the pied flycatcher, the wood warbler or the common redstart. Mammals found here include otters, hazel dormice and nearly all of the UK's 16 bat species. Three rare species: the barbastelle, and the greater and lesser horseshoe bats are of particular importance. The upper reaches of the rivers are spawning grounds for Salmon and trout; Palmate newts, frogs and toads breed in the numerous small pools. Two shrimp species can be found on Dartmoor: fairy shrimp that can be found in temporary pools, and, in underground streams, very rare cave shrimp. The world's largest land slug, the Ash black, is also found. Reptiles include common lizards and adders. The farmland in the wet valleys around the edge of the moors is the most important habitat for insects, including: the marsh fritillary butterfly, southern damselfly, narrow-bordered bee hawkmoth and bog hoverfly. Areas of bracken are home to the high brown fritillary and pearl-bordered fritillary. Insects found in the heathlands include the emperor moth, green hairstreak and the bilberry bumblebee. The old oak woodlands have a distinctive group of insects including the blue ground beetle and Heckford's pygmy moth, a species found nowhere else in the world.

== History ==
=== Pre-history ===
The majority of the prehistoric remains on Dartmoor date back to the late Neolithic and early Bronze Age. Indeed, Dartmoor contains the largest concentration of Bronze Age remains in the United Kingdom, which suggests that this was when a larger population moved onto the hills of Dartmoor. The large systems of Bronze Age fields, divided by reaves, cover an area of over 10,000 hectares (39 mi^{2}) of the lower moors.

The climate at the time was warmer than today, and much of today's moorland was covered with trees. The prehistoric settlers began clearing the forest, and established the first farming communities. Fire was the main method of clearing land, creating pasture and swidden types of fire-fallow farmland. Areas less suited for farming tended to be burned for livestock grazing. Over the centuries these Neolithic practices greatly expanded the upland moors, and contributed to the acidification of the soil and the accumulation of peat and bogs.

After a few thousand years, the mild climate deteriorated. This left these areas uninhabited, and, consequently, relatively undisturbed to the present day. The highly acidic soil has ensured that no organic remains have survived, but the durability of the granite has meant that the remains of buildings, enclosures and monuments have survived well, as have flint tools. A number of remains were "restored" by enthusiastic Victorians and, in some cases, they have placed their own interpretation on how an area may have looked.

=== Standing stones ===
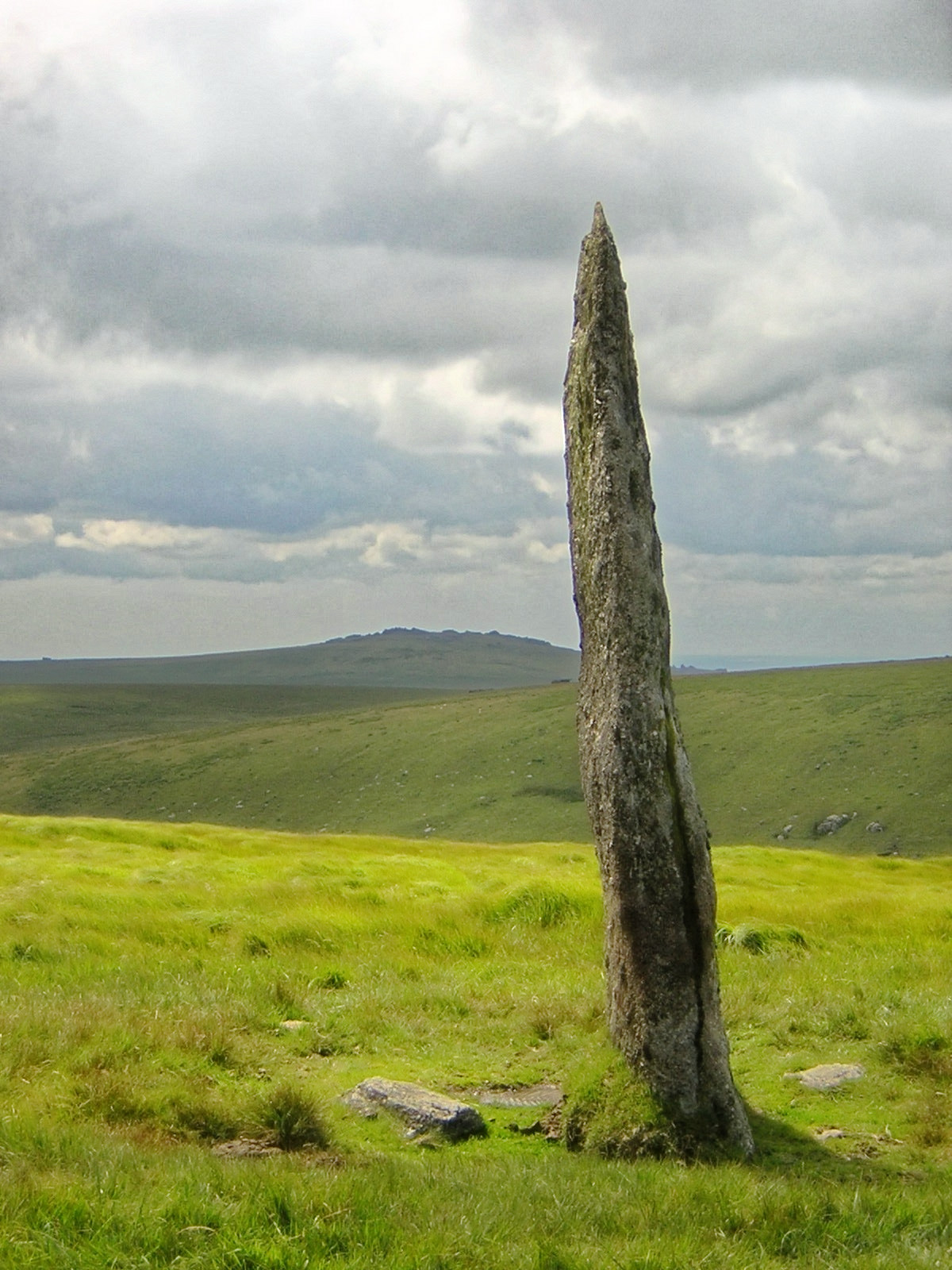
Beardown Man, Dartmoor

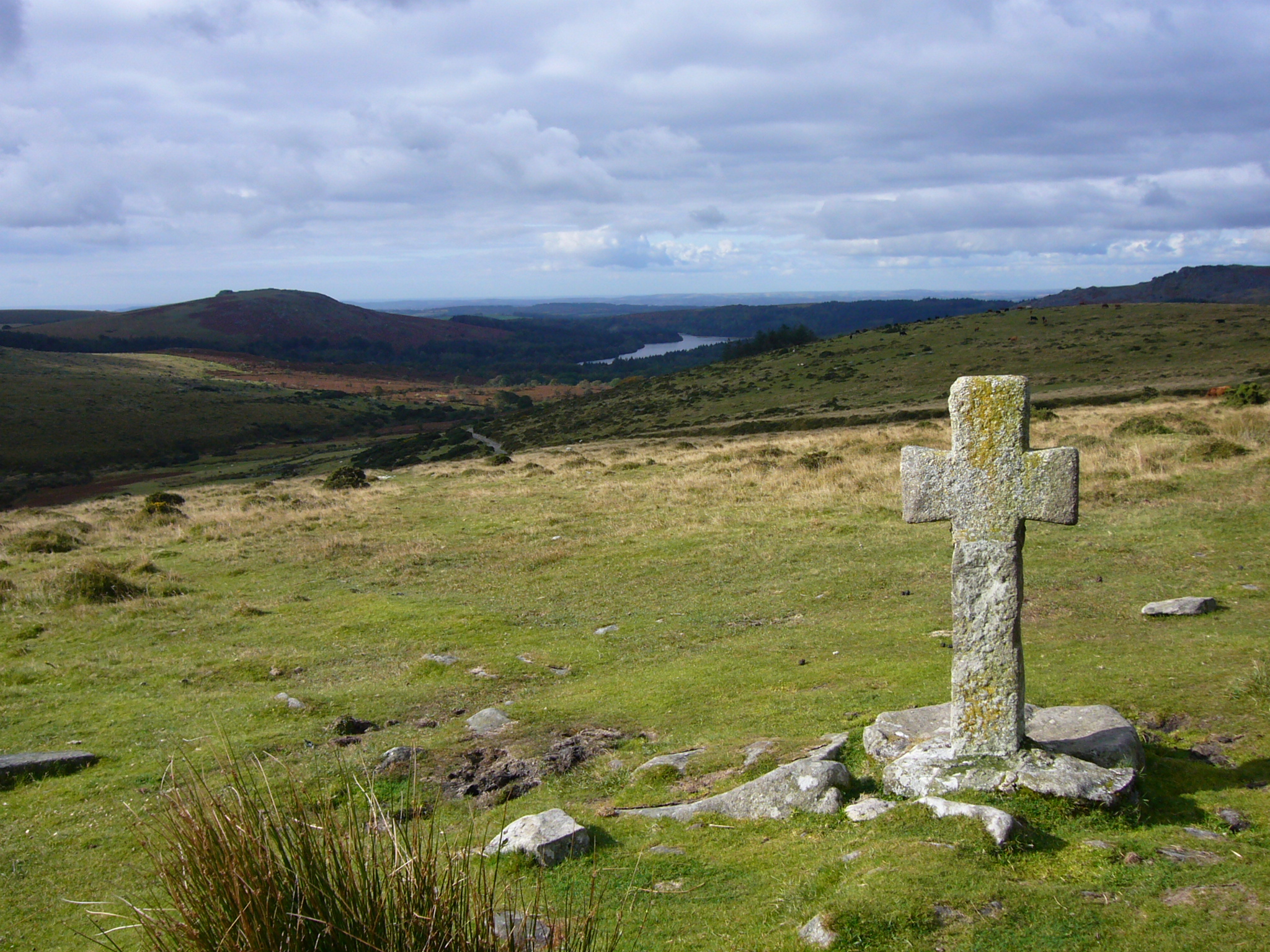
Ancient stone cross close to Crazywell Pool

Numerous prehistoric menhirs (more usually referred to locally as standing stones or longstones), stone circles, kistvaens, cairns and stone rows are to be found on the moor. The most significant sites include:

- Upper Erme stone row is the longest on Dartmoor and in fact in the world at 3,300 m (10,800 ft)
- Beardown Man, near Devil's Tor – isolated standing stone 3.5 m (11 ft 6 in) high, said to have another 1 m (3 ft 3 in) below ground. grid reference SX596796
- Challacombe, near the prehistoric settlement of Grimspound — triple stone row. grid reference SX689807
- Drizzlecombe, east of Sheepstor village – stone rows, standing stones, kistvaens and cairns. grid reference SX591669
- Grey Wethers, near Postbridge — double circle, aligned almost exactly north south. grid reference SX638831
- Laughter Tor, near Two Bridges — standing stone 2.4 m (7 ft 10 in) high and two double stone rows, one 164 m (538 ft) long. grid reference SX652753
- Merrivale, between Princetown and Tavistock — includes a double stone row 182 m (597 ft) long, 1.1 m (3 ft 7 in) wide, aligned almost exactly east–west, stone circles and a kistvaen. grid reference SX554747
- Scorhill (pronounced 'Scorill'), west of Chagford — circle, 26.8 m (88 ft) in circumference, and stone rows. grid reference SX654873
- Shovel Down, north of Fernworthy reservoir — double stone row approximately 120 m (390 ft) long. grid reference SX660859
- Yellowmead Down, a quadruple concentric stone circle and stone rows.

=== Hut circles and kistvaens ===
There are also an estimated 5,000 hut circles still surviving although many have been raided over the centuries by the builders of the traditional dry stone walls. These are the remnants of Bronze Age houses. The smallest are around 1.8 m (6 ft) in diameter, and the largest may be up to five times this size.

Some have L-shaped porches to protect against wind and rain; some particularly good examples are to be found at Grimspound. It is believed that they would have had a conical roof, supported by timbers and covered in turf or thatch.

There are also numerous kistvaens, Neolithic stone box-like tombs.

=== The historical period ===
The climate became wetter and cooler over the course of a thousand years from around 1000 BC, resulting in much of high Dartmoor being largely abandoned by its early inhabitants.

It was not until the early Mediaeval period that the weather again became warmer, and settlers moved back onto the moors. Like their ancient predecessors, they used the natural granite to build their homes, preferring a style known as the Dartmoor longhouse. The earliest surviving farms, still in operation today, are known as the Ancient Tenements. Most of these date back to the 14th century, and some even earlier. Some of the longhouses are still inhabited today, although they have been clearly adapted over the centuries. Many are now used as farm buildings, while others have been abandoned and fallen into ruin.

Some way into the moor stands the town of Princetown, the site of Dartmoor Prison, which was originally built by Isbell Rowe & Company, Plymouth, for prisoners of war from the Napoleonic Wars and the War of 1812. The prison has a reputation for being escape-proof, due to both the buildings themselves and its physical location.

The Dartmoor landscape is scattered with the marks left by the many generations who have lived and worked there over the centuries – such as the remains of the Dartmoor tin-mining industry, and farmhouses long since abandoned. See Industrial archaeology of Dartmoor.

== Ownership and access ==
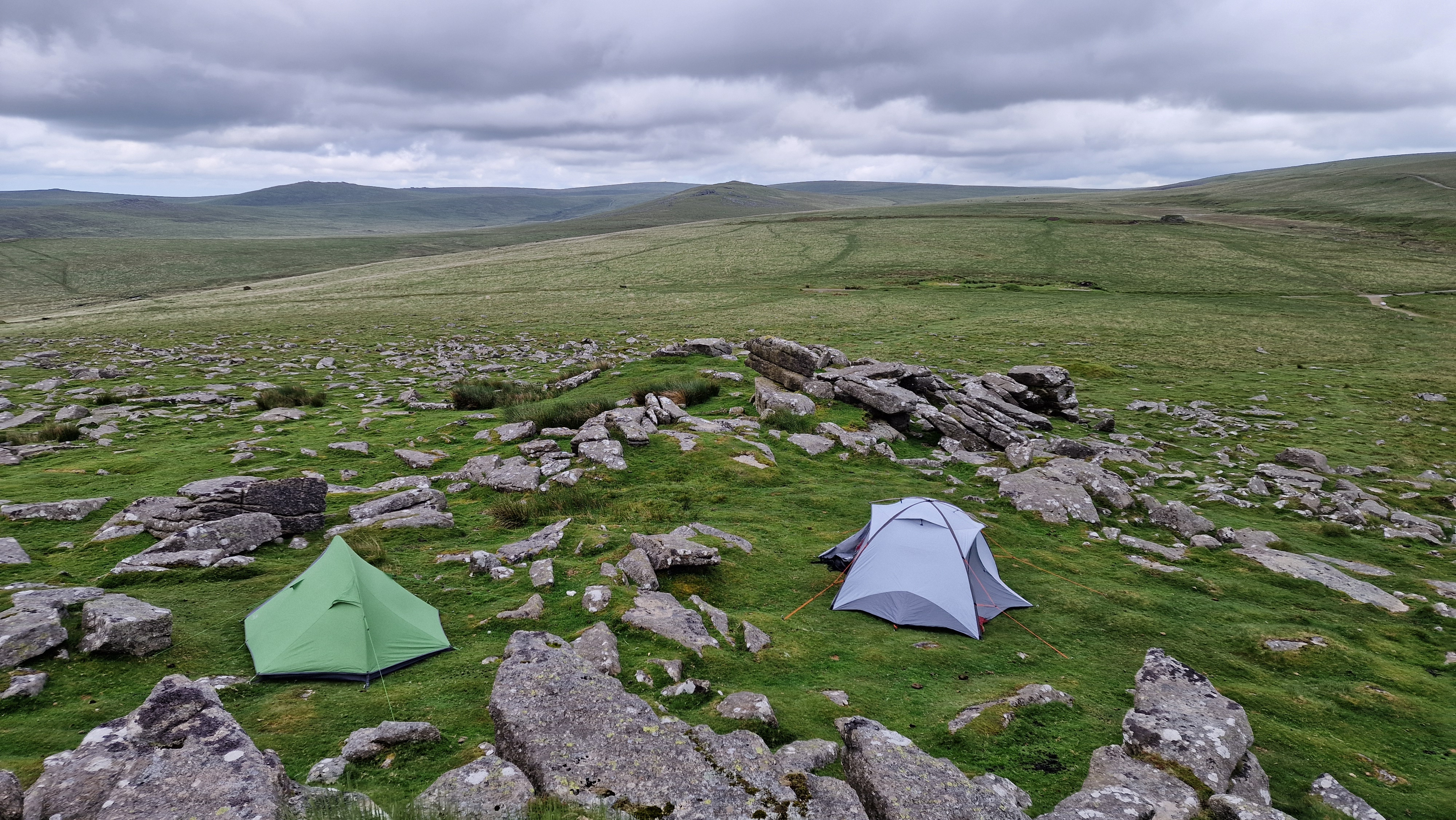
The right to wild camp on Dartmoor has been upheld and reinstated, following the Court of Appeal's ruling in mid-2023.

Over half of Dartmoor National Park (57.3%) is private land; the Forest of Dartmoor being the major part of this, owned by the Duke of Cornwall. The Ministry of Defence owns 14% (see below), 3.8% is owned by water companies (see Dartmoor reservoirs), 3.7% by the National Trust, 1.8% by the Forestry Commission and 1.4% by Dartmoor's national park authority. About 37% of Dartmoor is common land.

Dartmoor differs from some other National Parks in England and Wales, in that since the Dartmoor Commons Act 1985 much of it has been designated as access land, which, although it remains privately owned, has no restrictions on where walkers can roam. In addition to this access land, there are about 730 km (450 mi) of public rights of way on Dartmoor, and many kilometres of permitted footpaths and bridleways where the owners allow access.

Because of the 1985 Act, Dartmoor was largely unaffected by the Countryside and Rights of Way Act 2000, which established similar rights in other rural parts of the country, until 2006, when the 2000 Act opened up much of the remaining restricted land to walkers.

=== Camping ===
In January 2023, in a High Court judgment in a case brought by landowner Alexander Darwall, the right of the public to wild camp on Dartmoor was lost. Julian Flaux, the Chancellor of the High Court, ruled: "...section 10(1) of the 1985 Act does not confer on the public any right to pitch tents or otherwise make camp overnight on Dartmoor Commons. Any such camping requires the consent of the landowner." A protest against the new restrictions, led by local storyteller Martin Shaw, was held in January 2023. The High Court's decision was overturned by the Court of Appeal on 31 July 2023 allowing wild camping on Dartmoor. The Darwalls were granted leave to appeal to the Supreme Court, who upheld the Court of Appeal's decision to allow wild camping on Dartmoor on 21 May 2025.

=== Use by the Ministry of Defence ===
There is a history of military usage of Dartmoor dating back to the Napoleonic Wars. Today, a large British Army training camp remains at Okehampton — also the site of an airbase during the Second World War.

The Ministry of Defence (MoD) uses three areas of the northern moor for manoeuvres and live-firing exercises, totalling 108.71 km^{2} (41.97 sq mi), or just over 11% of the National Park. Red and white posts mark the boundaries of these military areas (shown on Ordnance Survey 1:25,000 scale maps). Flagpoles on many tors in and around the ranges fly red flags when firing is taking place. At other times, members of the public are allowed access. Blank rounds may also be used, but the MoD does not notify the public of this in advance.

Some "challenge" and charitable events take place with assistance of the military on Dartmoor, including the long established Ten Tors event and the more recent Dartmoor Beast.

The disused Rippon Tor Rifle Range was built to train soldiers during the Second World War, and remained in use until its closure in 1977.

== Preservation ==
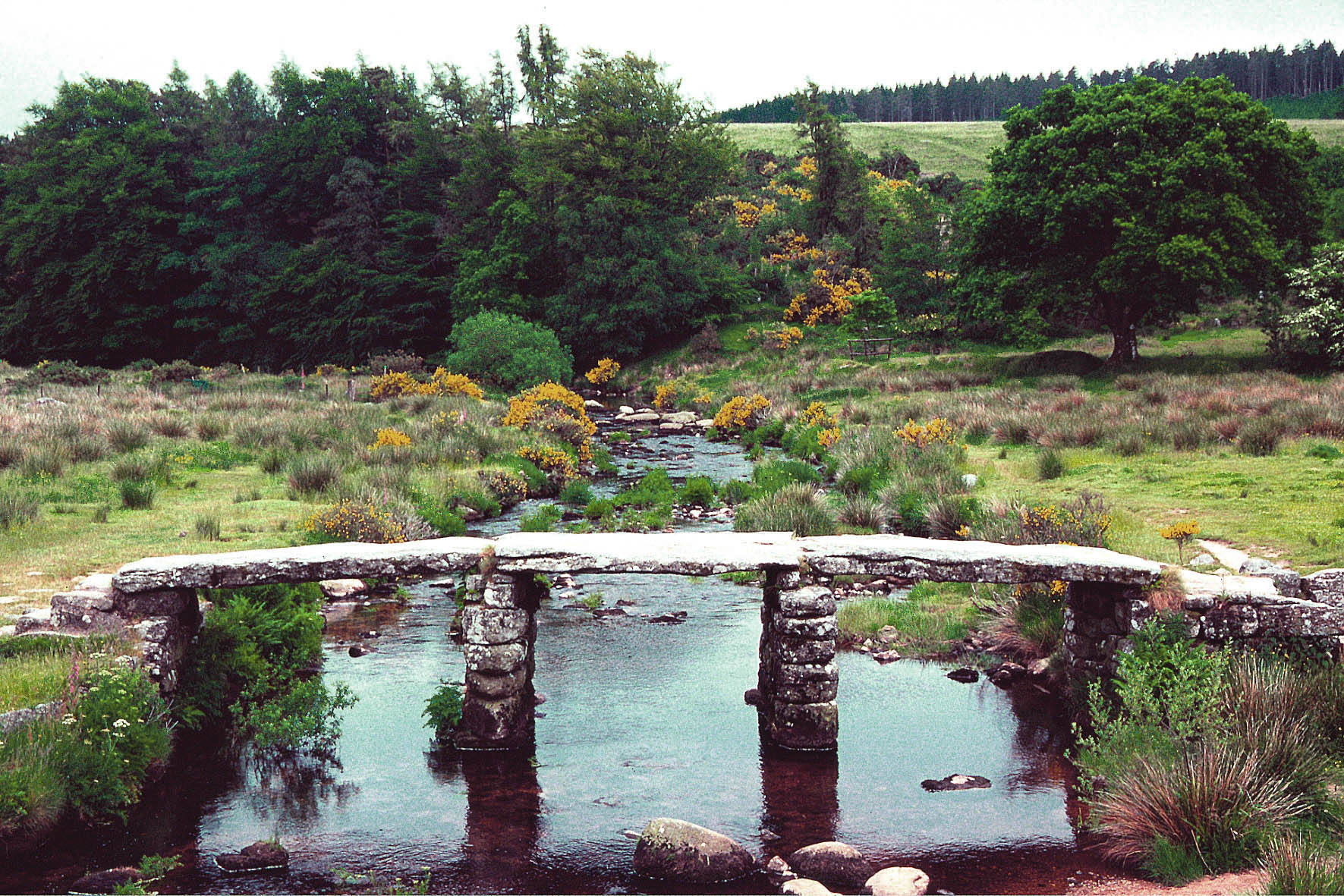
The clapper bridge at Postbridge

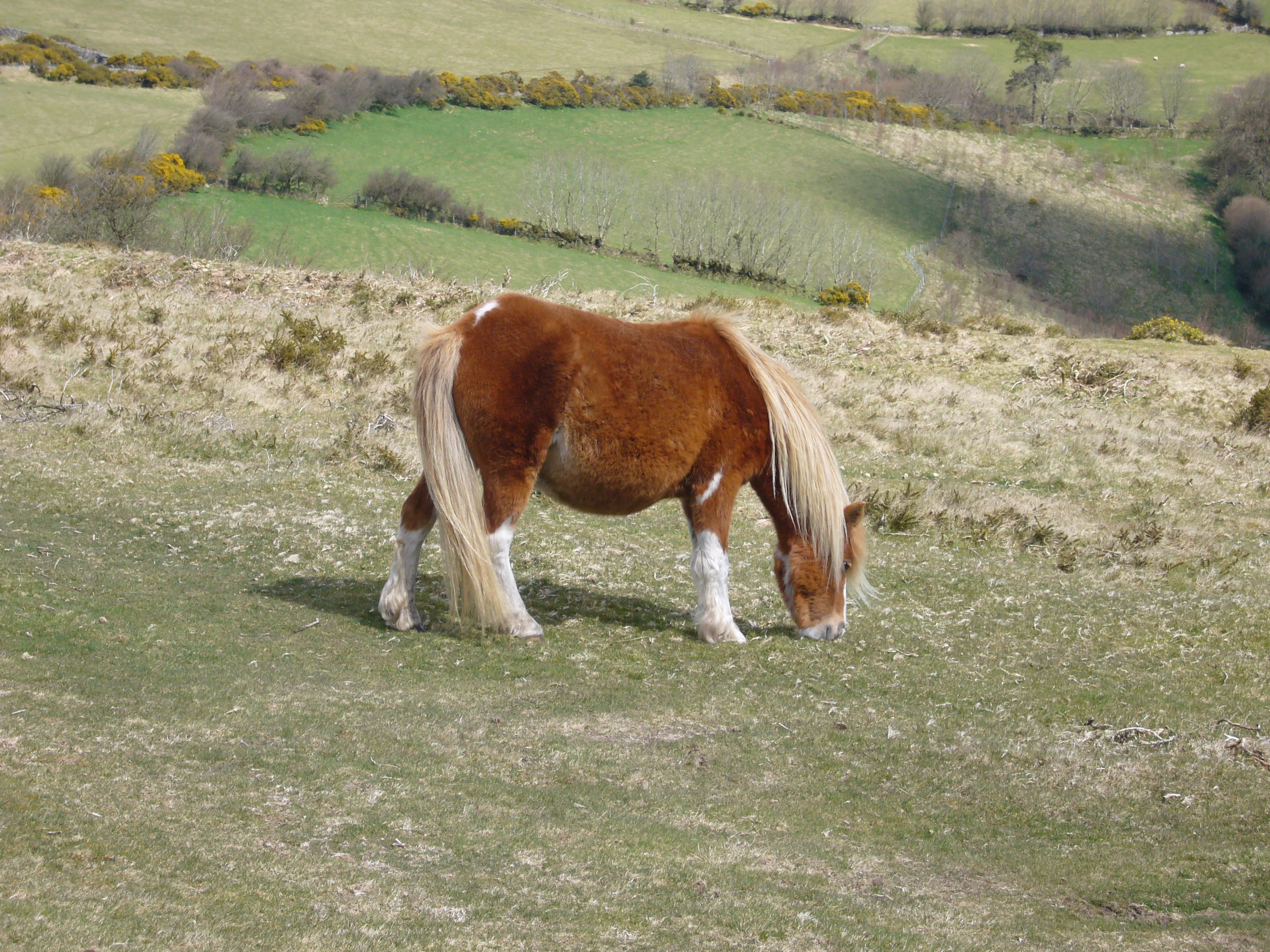
Dartmoor pony near Widecombe in the Moor

Throughout human history, the landscape has been exploited for industrial purposes. In recent years, controversy has surrounded the work of industrial conglomerates Imerys and Sibelco (formerly Watts Blake Bearne), who have used parts of the moor for china clay mining. Licences were granted by the British Government but were recently renounced after sustained public pressure from bodies such as the Dartmoor Preservation Association.

The British government has made promises to protect the integrity of the moor; however, the cost of compensating companies for these licences, which may not have been granted in today's political climate, could prove prohibitive.

The military use of the moor has been another source of controversy, as when training was extended in January 2003. The national park authority received 1,700 objections before making the decision. Objectors said that Dartmoor should be an area for recreation, and that the training disturbs the peace.

Those who objected included the Open Spaces Society and the Dartmoor Preservation Association. During her lifetime, Sylvia Sayer was another outspoken critic of the damage that she perceived that the army was doing to the moor.

== Towns and villages ==
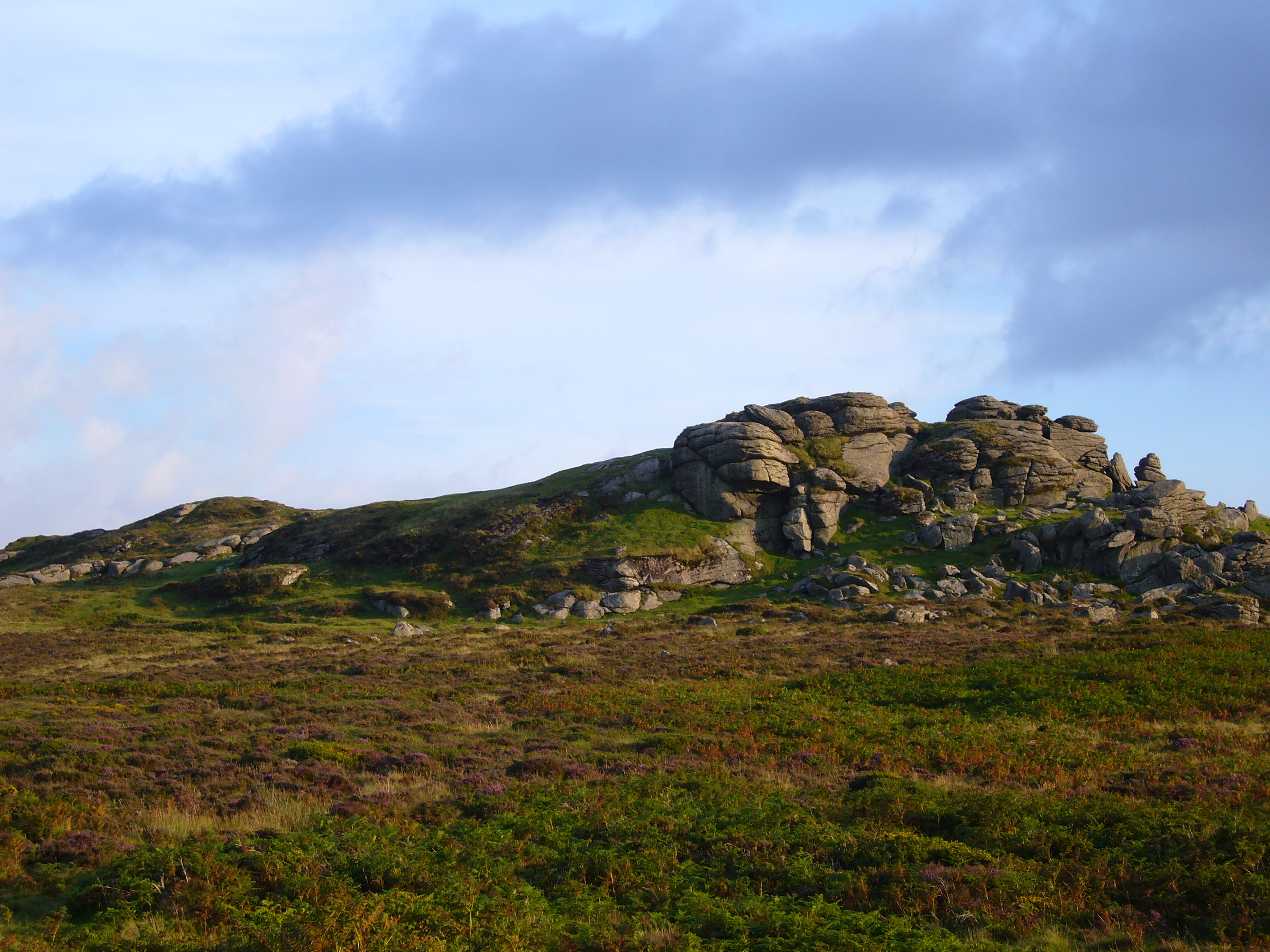
A typical Dartmoor tor close to Haytor

The designated Dartmoor National Park area has a resident population of about 33,000, which swells considerably during holiday periods with incoming tourists. The largest settlements within the National Park are Ashburton (the largest, with a population of about 3,500), Buckfastleigh, Moretonhampstead, Princetown, Yelverton, Horrabridge, South Brent, Christow, and Chagford.

For a full list, expand the Settlements of Dartmoor navigational box at the bottom of this page.

== Landmarks ==
- Avon Dam Reservoir – reservoir popular for walks and trout fishing
- Bowerman's Nose – a tor said to be shaped like a nose
- Brentor Church – remote church 344 m (1,129 ft) high on crag at western edge of moor
- Buckfast Abbey – abbey near Buckfastleigh
- Burrator Reservoir – late Victorian reservoir
- Canonteign Falls – second highest waterfall in England
- Castle Drogo – Edwardian faux castle built by Edwin Lutyens on a crag above Teign Gorge, Drewsteignton
- Childe's Tomb – ancient burial site
- Cosdon Hill – prominent hill, northern extremity of moor, site of beacon fire for invasion warning
- Cranmere Pool – original letterbox site and location of the legend of Cranmere Binjie
- Crazywell Pool – artificial lake
- Dartmeet – meeting point of East and West Dart rivers
- Dartmoor Prison – a prison in the middle of Dartmoor at the village of Princetown
- Devonport Leat – human-made water channel
- Duck's Pool – location of a memorial to local writer William Crossing
- Fernworthy Dam & Reservoir – granite-faced concrete dam and lake in Fernworthy Forest, near Chagford
- Fingle Bridge – a 17th-century crossing of the River Teign near Chagford
- Great Links Tor – dominant tor on north west scarp of moor
- Grey Wethers – pair of ancient stone circles
- Grimspound – Bronze Age settlement
- Haytor Granite Tramway – early tramway with stone rails; ran from quarries at Haytor to Stover Canal
- Haytor Rock – prominent tor and viewpoint between Bovey Tracey and Widecombe
- Hay Tor – less prominent outcrop behind Haytor Rock when viewed from the south. Popular spot for rock climbing due to its large cliff face and relative ease of access.
- High Willhays – highest point on Dartmoor
- Hound Tor – rugged tor with remains of Iron Age village
- Jay's Grave – burial site
- Lydford Gorge – deep and narrow gorge with waterfalls
- Meldon Viaduct and reservoir – 201 m (659 ft) wide and 45 m (148 ft) high concrete dam and Victorian iron bridge which itself is 165 m (541 ft) wide and 46 m (151 ft) high
- North Hessary Tor transmitting station – a TV mast near Princetown which can be seen for many miles.
- Rippon Tor Rifle Range – disused rifle range
- Redlake Tramway – disused railway
- Spitchwick – a swimming spot where the River Webburn joins the River Dart
- Tavistock Canal – 19th-century canal
- Two Bridges – 18th-century coaching inn
- Warren House Inn – highest inn in south west England, rumoured to have a fire which has not gone out in hundreds of years.
- Widecombe in the moor, village in a valley in southern Dartmoor with a church rumoured to have been struck by lightning in medieval times.
- Wistman's Wood – copse of stunted oaks in the valley of the West Dart near Two Bridges
- Yes Tor – tor next to High Willhays, forming the second highest hill in Dartmoor.
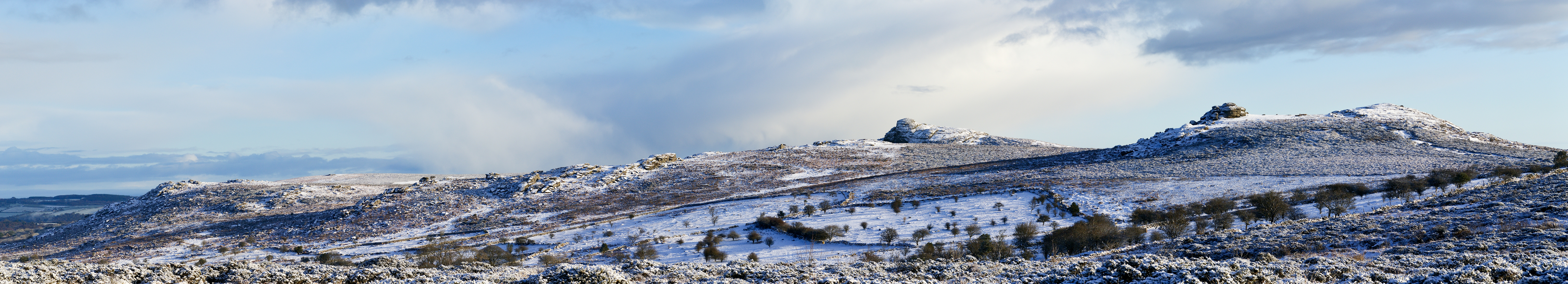
Panorama of some better known Dartmoor tors in snow

== In myths and popular culture ==
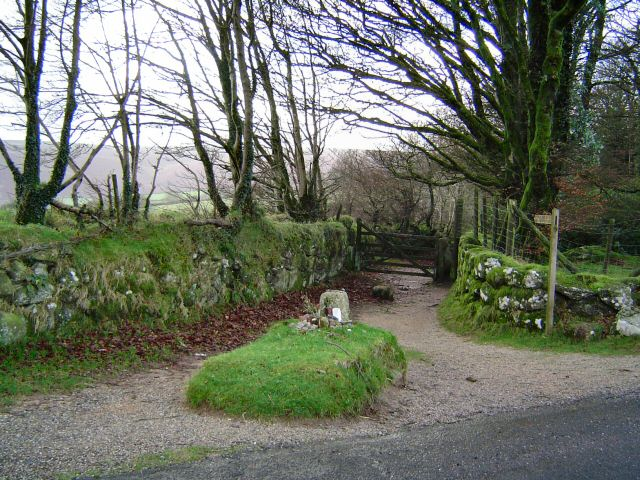
Jay's Grave

Dartmoor is known for its many ancient myths and legends. It is reputedly the haunt of pixies, a headless horseman, a mysterious pack of "spectral hounds", and a large black dog, among others. During the Great Thunderstorm of 1638, the moorland village of Widecombe-in-the-Moor was said to have been visited by the Devil.

In addition to the many general legends and myths, some specific Dartmoor-based landmarks have ghost stories associated with them. For example, the ancient burial site of Childe's Tomb, the rock pile called Bowerman's Nose, the stone crosses that mark former mediaeval routes across the moor and the allegedly haunted Jay's Grave. In recent decades, other stories have emerged such as the "hairy hands", that are said to attack motorists on the B3212 near Two Bridges; and the "Beast of Dartmoor", a supposed big cat.

In 1820, the newly formed Royal Society of Literature offered a prize for a poem on the subject of Dartmoor, this being won by Felicia Hemans. This location has also inspired a number of other artists and writers, such as Sir Arthur Conan Doyle in The Hound of the Baskervilles and "The Adventure of Silver Blaze", R. D. Blackmore, Eden Phillpotts, Beatrice Chase, Agatha Christie, Rosamunde Pilcher, Gilbert Adair, the Reverend Sabine Baring-Gould and Bertram Fletcher Robinson.

The Old Dark House is a 1963 comedy horror film directed by William Castle for Hammer Film Productions. It is a remake of Universal's 1932 film of the same name directed by James Whale. Both films are based upon the 1927 novel by J. B. Priestley originally published under the name Benighted. The 1963 film starred Tom Poston, Robert Morley, Janette Scott, Joyce Grenfell and Fenella Fielding, and it is predominantly set on Dartmoor.

Dartmoor is also featured in a number of award-winning film, television and video game productions. For example, in the 2005 film Harry Potter and the Goblet of Fire, the fictional 1994 Quidditch World Cup final between Ireland and Bulgaria is hosted here. In 2010, Ditsworthy Warren House near Sheepstor was used as a filming location for the Steven Spielberg film, War Horse. In 2012, the BBC released The Hounds of Baskerville, which is a second series episode of the television drama, Sherlock and it features a fictional Dartmoor-based animal testing centre called 'Baskerville'. In 2021, the IO Interactive video game titled Hitman 3 was released and this features a Dartmoor-based mansion as a location.

== Leisure activities ==
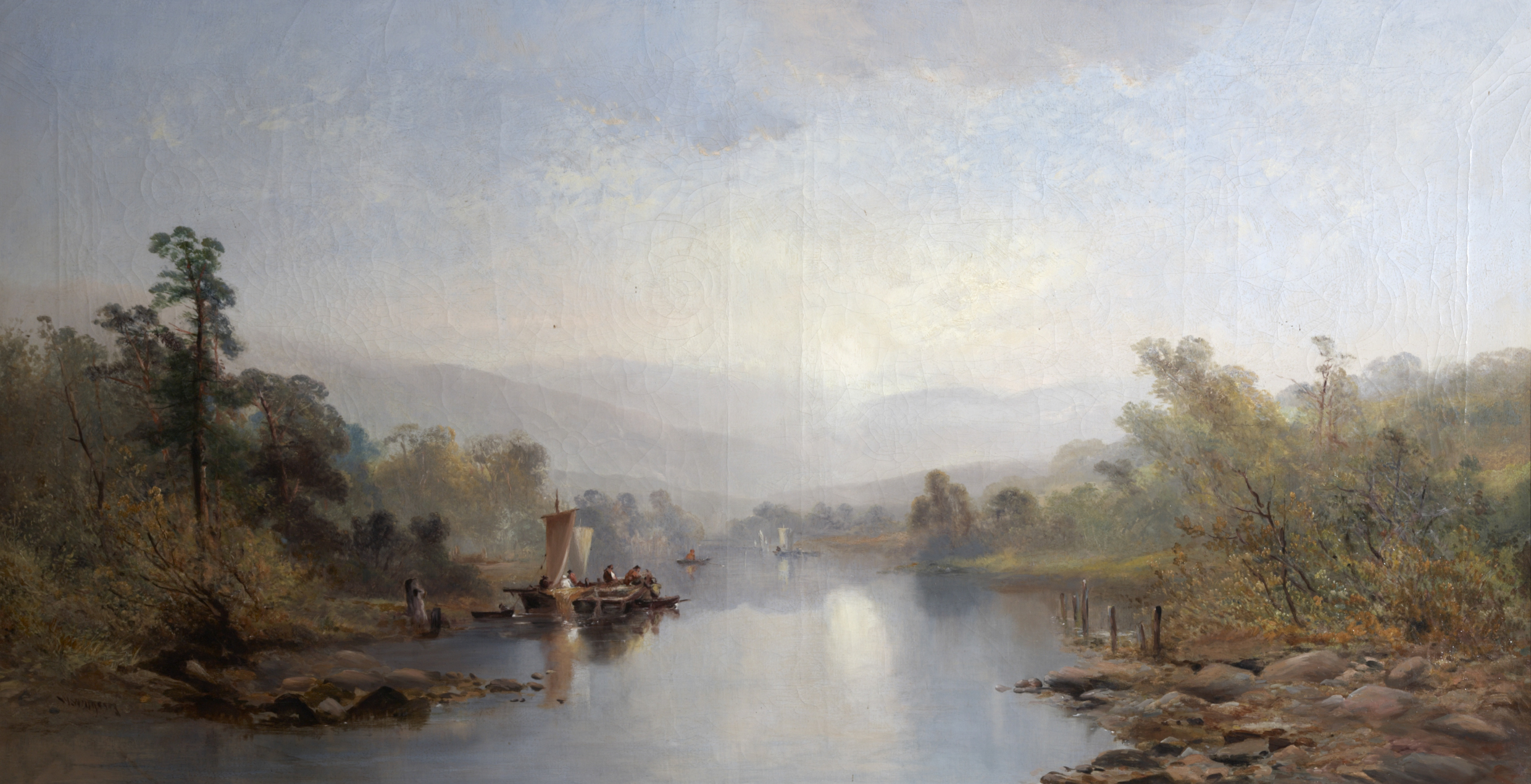
River Scene, Dartmoor in background by William Widgery, 19th century

Until the early 19th century Dartmoor was not considered to be a place worth visiting: in the 1540s John Leland wrote in his Itinerary that "Dartmore is muche a wilde Morish and forest Ground", and even by 1789 Richard Gough's opinion was that it is a "dreary mountainous tract". At the turn of the 19th century John Swete was one of the first people to visit Dartmoor for pleasure and his journals and watercolour paintings now provide a valuable historical resource.

The oldest leisure pursuit on the moor is hill walking. William Crossing's definitive Guide to Dartmoor was published in 1909, and in 1938 a plaque and letterbox in his memory were placed at Duck's Pool on the southern moor. Parts of the Abbots Way, Two Moors Way and the Templer Way are on Dartmoor.

Letterboxing originated on Dartmoor in the 19th century and has become increasingly popular in recent decades. Watertight containers, or 'letterboxes', are hidden throughout the moor, each containing a visitor's book and a rubber stamp. Visitors take an impression of the letterbox's rubber stamp as proof of finding the box and record their visit by stamping their own personal stamp in the letterbox's logbook. A recent related development is geocaching. Geocache clues make use of GPS coordinates, whereas letterboxing clues tend to consist of grid references and compass bearings.

Whitewater kayaking and canoeing are popular on the rivers due to the high rainfall and their high quality, though for environmental reasons access is restricted to the winter months. The River Dart is the most prominent meeting place, the section known as the Loop being particularly popular. Other white water rivers are the Erme, Tavy, Plym and Meavy.

Other activities are rock climbing on the granite tors and outcrops, some of the well-known venues being Haytor, Hound Tor and The Dewerstone; horse riding, which can be undertaken on any of the common land; cycling (but not on open moorland); and angling for wild brown trout, sea trout and salmon (although much of the river fishing on Dartmoor is privately owned, permits are available for some stretches) .

=== Visitor centres ===
The park's main visitor centre is located in Princetown and features exhibits about Dartmoor's history, culture and wildlife, as well as changing displays of local art. The visitor centres located in Postbridge and Haytor feature information, maps, guidebooks and items for exploring the area.

=== Astronomy ===
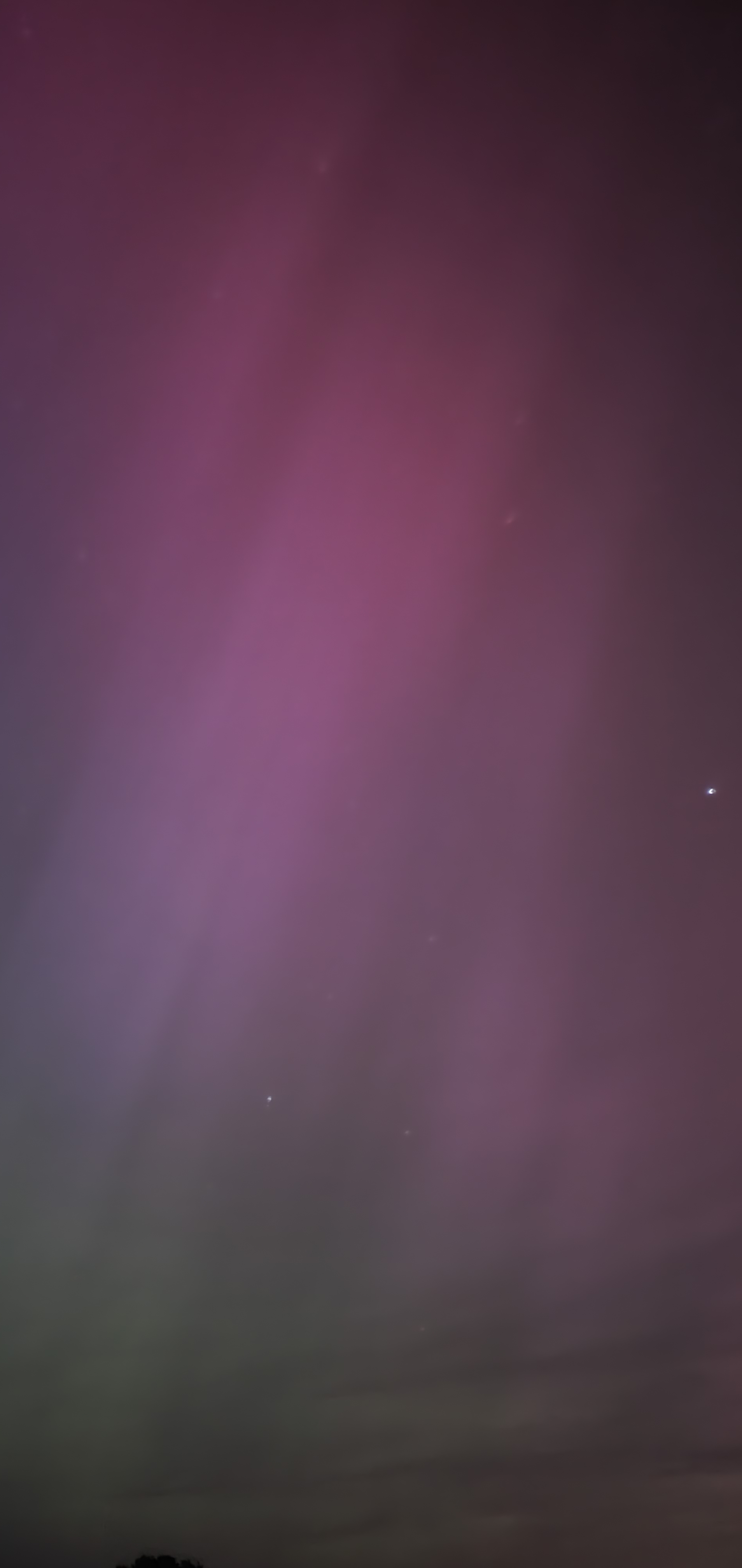
Aurora borealis visible from near Bridford during the May 2024 solar storms

Dartmoor is popular with local astronomers because it is remote from many sources of light pollution. However, in recent years, LED street lights have caused more light pollution to be spread onto Dartmoor.

== Transport ==
=== Bus ===
Dartmoor is served by the following bus services:

- 359 Moretonhampstead – Exeter (Country bus)
- 271 Newton Abbot – Bovey Tracey – Widecombe (Summer Saturdays only) (Country bus)
- 173 Moretonhampstead – Chagford – Exeter (Stagecoach)
- 178 Newton Abbot – Bovey Tracey – M'tonhampstead – Chagford – Okehampton (Country bus)
- 98 Tavistock – Princetown – Postbridge (Oakleys)

Other bus services operate in Dartmoor on a less frequent basis.

GWR operate direct trains from Exeter to Okehampton.

== See also ==
- Dartmoor Discovery, ultramarathon race
- Dartmoor Way long-distance footpath
- Museum of Dartmoor Life
