= Shovel Down =

Area of Dartmoor in Devon, England

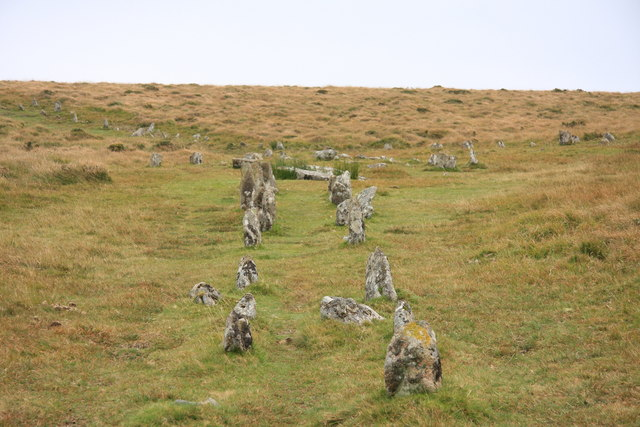
- Stone row on Shovel Down looking towards the Fourfold Circle

- Location within Devon
- 50.657°N 3.904°W
- Type: Stone rows, stone circle, standing stones
- Periods: Bronze Age
- Location: Devon
- OS grid reference: SX660860

Shovel Down is an area of Dartmoor in Devon that is covered in megaliths including the remains of several stone rows, the Fourfold Stone Circle, and several standing stones.

== Stone rows ==
The Shovel Down stone row complex (grid reference SX66968660) occupies the northern and southern slopes of a broad east-west ridge of unenclosed moorland. It is of probable Bronze Age date. Approximately five double stone rows and one single stone row are to be seen. Other probable Bronze Age monuments are in the immediate area, including the Fourfold Circle, the Long Stone, the Three Boy's Stone, and several cairns.

== Fourfold Circle ==
The Fourfold Circle (grid reference SX65958601) is a configuration of four concentric stone circles. The outer circle has a diameter of 9 m, the others have diameters of 6.4 m, 4.7 m and 2.4 m respectively. The Fourfold Circle is the location of a turf-covered cairn with a central cist which has been robbed.

== The Long Stone ==
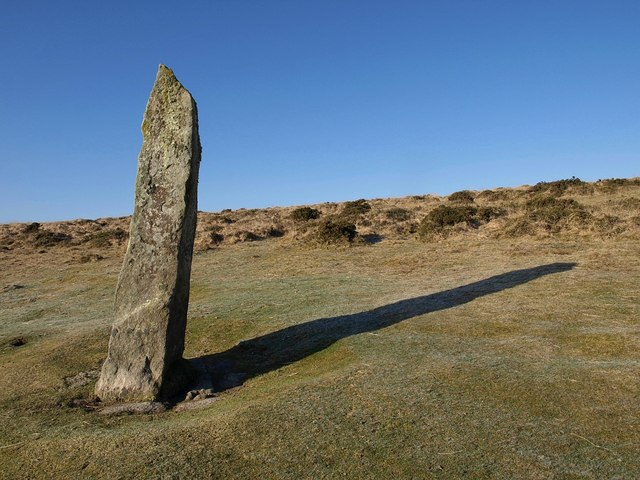
The Long Stone

The Long Stone (grid reference SX66028567) stands in the middle of two stone rows. It is referred to as the "Langstone" in a documentary source of 1240. It now marks the boundary of three parishes.

== Three Boys standing stone ==
The Three Boys standing stone (grid reference SX66028549) is a stone marking the southern end of one of the stone rows. It is the only survivor of three such stones known as the Three Boys. The two other stones are believed to have been taken for use as gateposts.
