= High Willhays =

Dartmoor and Southern England's highest point

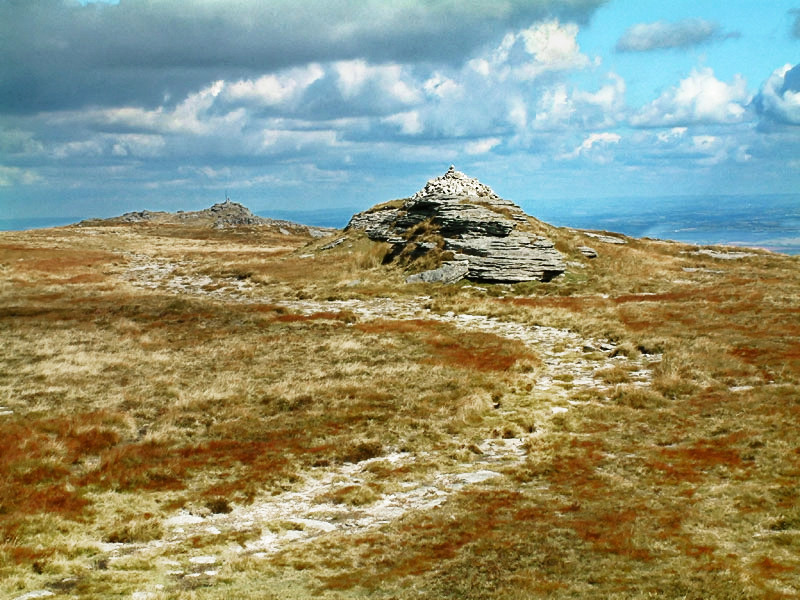
- High Willhays with Yes Tor beyond

Highest point
- Elevation: 621 m (2,039 ft)
- Prominence: c. 537 m (1,762 ft)
- Parent peak: Cross Fell
- Listing: Marilyn, Hewitt, County Top, Nuttall
- Coordinates: 50°41′06″N 4°00′36″W

Geography
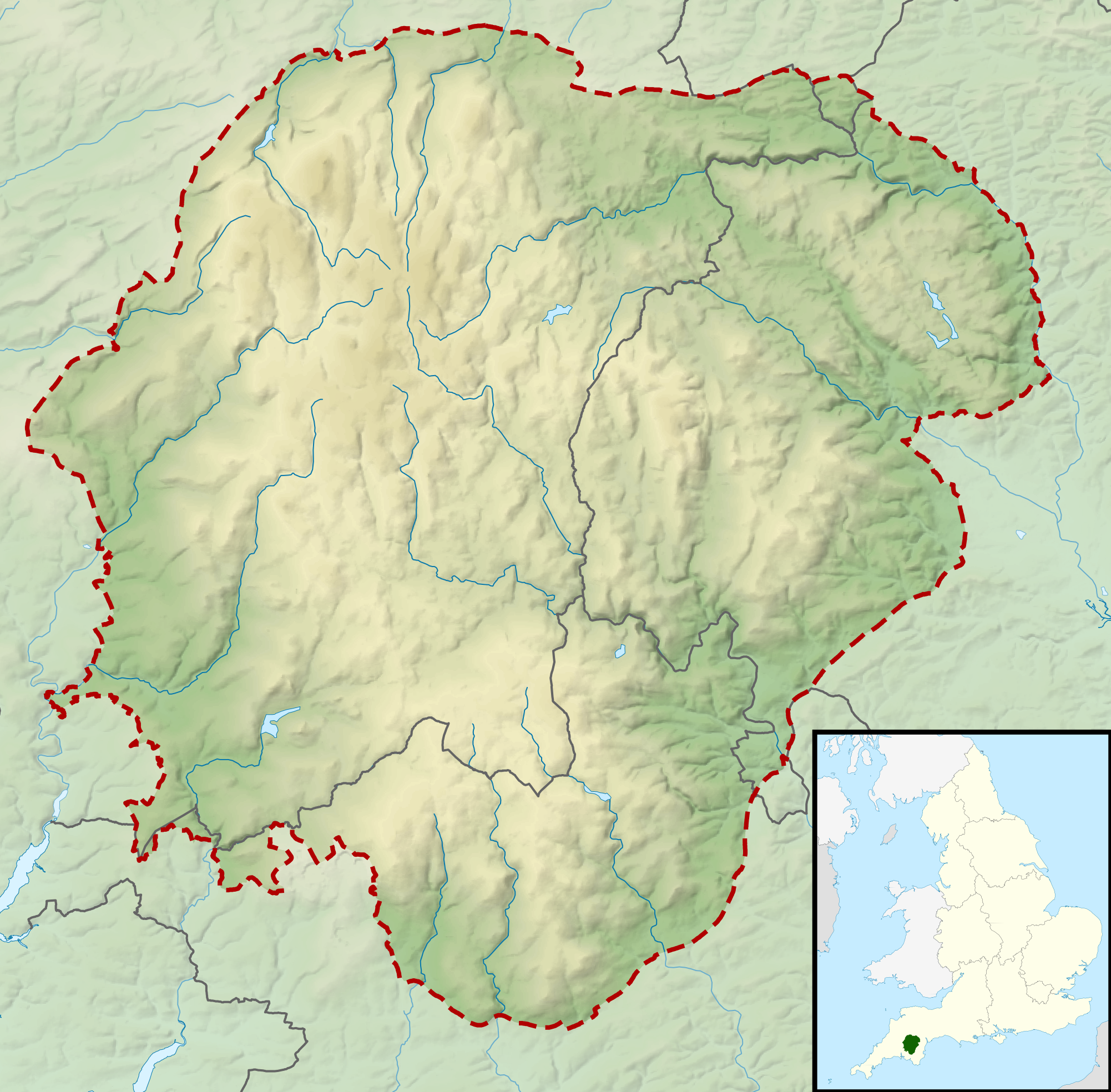
- Location within Dartmoor
- Location: Dartmoor, England
- OS grid: SX580892
- Topo map: OS Landranger 191

Climbing
- Easiest route: From Meldon Reservoir, SX 562918

High Willhays (/ˈwɪliːz, ˈwɪlheɪz/ WIL-eez, WIL-hayz), or according to some authorities High Willes, is the highest point on Dartmoor, Devon, at 621 metres (2,039 feet) above sea level, and the highest point in Southern England. It is generally regarded as the most southernly mountain in the United Kingdom, being only about half a mile south of its sister peak; Yes Tor.

== Toponymy ==
In 1912, William Crossing, writer and documenter, said that the name High Willes had been thought to have derived from the word huel or wheal meaning mine, but he did not think that very likely as old mine workings were invariably located close to streams. He suggested instead that the name derived from gwylfa, a watching place, noting its similarity with Brown Willy, the name of the highest hill on nearby Bodmin Moor, and suggested that a watch for beacon fires used to be kept here. He also posited a possible link to the word gwili meaning winding or tortuous, but said it was unlikely this was where it originated from.

The Place-Names of Devon (1931) notes that the peak was named Hight Wyll in a document of 1532, and was known in 1827 as High Willows. The authors state that the name may simply be a compound of high and well (meaning spring), though they admit that the additional syllable at the end is hard to explain.

== Topography ==
High Willhays is near the northwestern edge of Dartmoor, about 2.5 km (1 1/2 miles) south east of Meldon Reservoir and about 5 km (3 miles) south of the town of Okehampton. Although it is the highest point of the moor, it is relatively insignificant in comparison to most of the moor's tors, consisting of no more than a few low outcrops of rock along a north–south ridge. The largest outcrop is crowned with a cairn. The more impressive, but slightly lower, Yes Tor is about 1 km (5/8 mile) north along this ridge, which is known as "the roof of Devon".

High Willhays and Yes Tor are two of only four summits in England south of Kinder Scout in the Peak District to rise above 2,000 feet (610 m), the others being Black Mountain on the Welsh border and Black Hill nearby in Herefordshire. Before Ordnance Survey measured accurately the heights of High Willhays and Yes Tor many people believed Yes Tor was the higher of the two, and it was only the local farmers and moormen that believed the contrary. However, the first topographical survey of the area carried out by Ordnance Survey suggested that High Willhays was 12 feet (3.7 m) higher, although the difference has now been measured at just 8 feet (2.4 m). William Crossing stated that High Willhays was the highest point in England south of Ingleborough in the Yorkshire Dales, but since then surveys have shown that several summits south of Ingleborough - situated in both the Dales and the Peak District - are higher, including Kinder Scout (albeit the latter is less prominent), and that Black Mountain on the Wales/Herefordshire border and Black Hill in Herefordshire are also higher. Despite being classified as a mountain due to its elevation (621 m) and prominence, visually it is said to look far more like a somewhat steeper hill, inkeeping with the normal, generally undulating landscape of Dartmoor.

The geology of High Willhays, like most of Dartmoor, consists of granite intruded about 280 million years ago. However High Willhays is in an area of the northern plateau of the moor where the exposed rock has noticeably fewer of the large feldspar megacrysts that are typical of most of Dartmoor's tors. Each of the outcrops displays lamellar bedding.

High Willhays is within one of Dartmoor's Danger Zones, areas used periodically by the British Army for exercises. Red flags are raised around the perimeter when live-firing is due to take place.

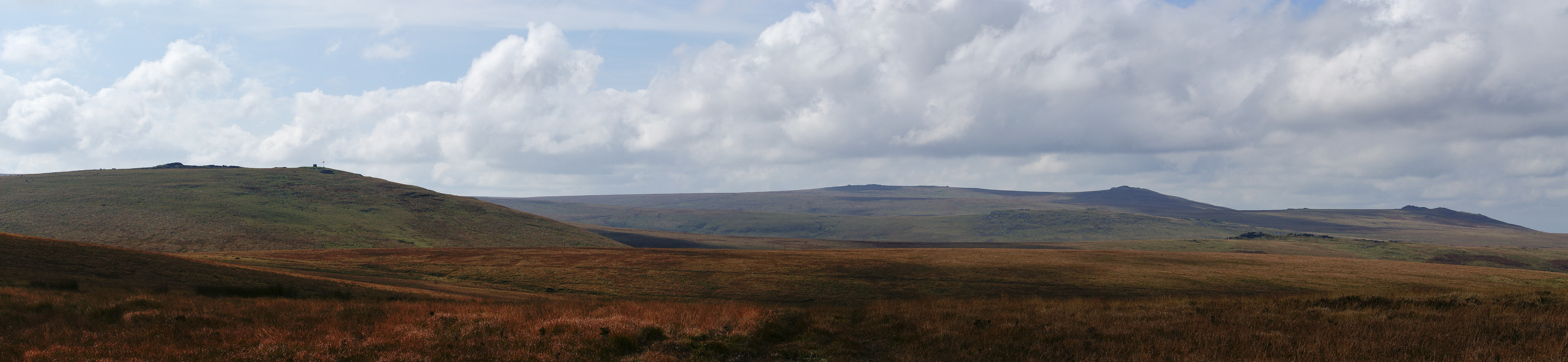
View over Dartmoor from Hound Tor, showing High Willhays at the centre
