= Rippon Tor Rifle Range =

English rifle range from World War II

Coordinates: 50.5510°N 3.7653°W

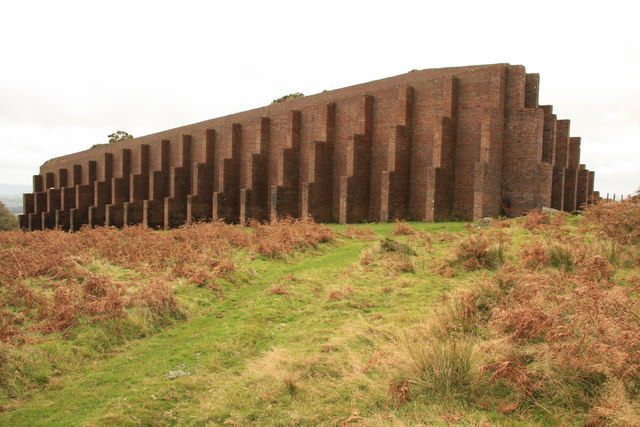
Rippon Tor Rifle Range's brick stop butt.

Rippon Tor Rifle Range is a disused rifle range from World War II on Dartmoor, Devon, England. The range is situated southeast of the 473 m high Rippon Tor, near the village Widecombe-in-the-Moor, and close to the road between Halshanger and Cold East Cross.

== History ==
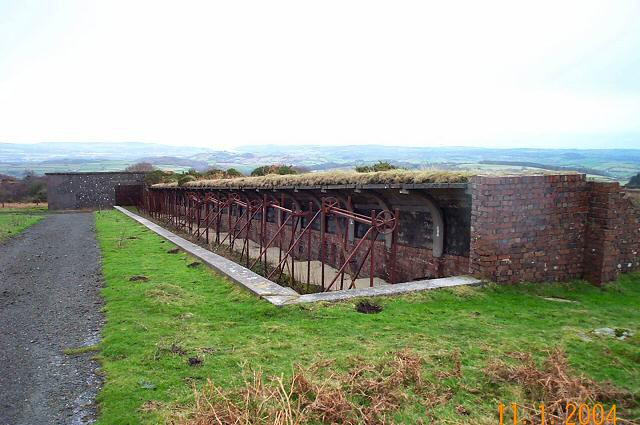
The marker's gallery, with the remaining target mechanism. At the far end is the store/workshop building.

The outbreak of World War II in 1939 resulted in much of Dartmoor being used for military training, particularly artillery firing. As part of the training facilities, a new rifle range was built near Rippon Tor in 1942.

In 1948, the government confirmed the range would remain open for the use of local units of the Territorial Army. Dartmoor was granted National Park status in 1951 and its managing authority spent years campaigning for military training in Dartmoor to be transferred elsewhere. The authority considered the range at Rippon Tor to be dangerous to nearby walkers.

The range was closed in 1977 as an implementation of the recommendations of the Nugent Committee. The committee was formed in 1971 to consider military landholdings in respect of training requirements and the public animosity surrounding the use of sites in areas like Dartmoor. The committee's recommendations were made in 1973, which, including the release of some land at Okehampton and the range at Rippon Tor, aimed to reach "the best possible compromise between the Army's training requirements and the national park's amenity requirements".

Although some called for the range's demolition after its closure, including the Dartmoor Preservation Association, the landowner decided to retain it as a piece of wartime archaeology. At the time, the cost of demolition was expected to be "tremendous", and the use of lead in the core of the range's construction was an environmental concern if demolition were to be carried out.

== Design ==
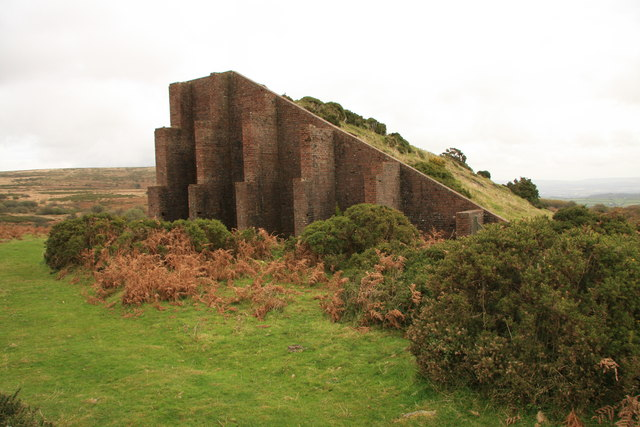
One side of the stop butt.

The range has a north–south alignment and spans an approximate distance of 600 metres in length and 80 metres in width. The range's stop butt is built of brick, and is approximately 55 metres long, 15.5 metres wide and 9.2 metres high. It is supported by nineteen buttresses on the north side and six buttresses each on the east and west sides. The back stop (the receiving end) is infilled with earth, gravel and sand to form a sloping bank southwards. On the opposite side of the butt is the markers' gallery, which is an earth-covered structure of concrete and brick. It retains the mechanism that once raised and lowered its twelve Hythe pattern target frames. Adjoining it on the east side is the former target store and workshop. There are six earthwork firing points which are set approximately 91.5 metres apart to the east.

To the south-west, at the entrance to the range site, is the former concrete troop shelter, toilet block, possible vehicle park and service road. A likely pumping station for the range, next to the road between Cold East Cross and Halshanger Cross, was noted in a survey of the site in 2010. The remains of a water storage structure, located close to the butts, contains four galvanised storage tanks. The fencing along the boundary of the range has been removed, but the posts remain.

== Gallery ==
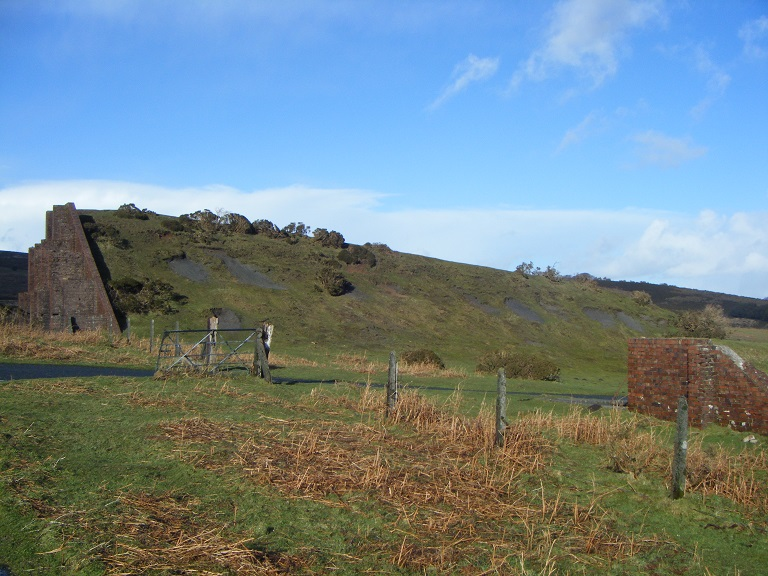
The back stop banking.

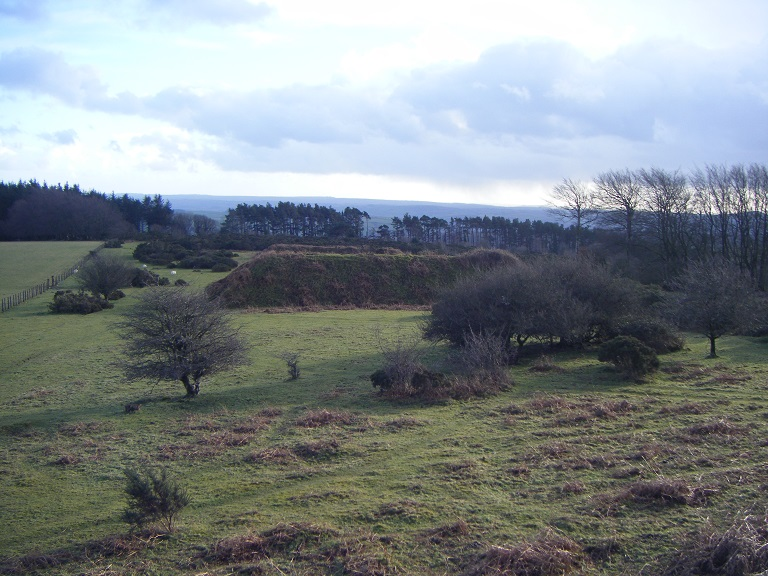
Two earth mounds, where the soldiers would fire at the stop butt from.

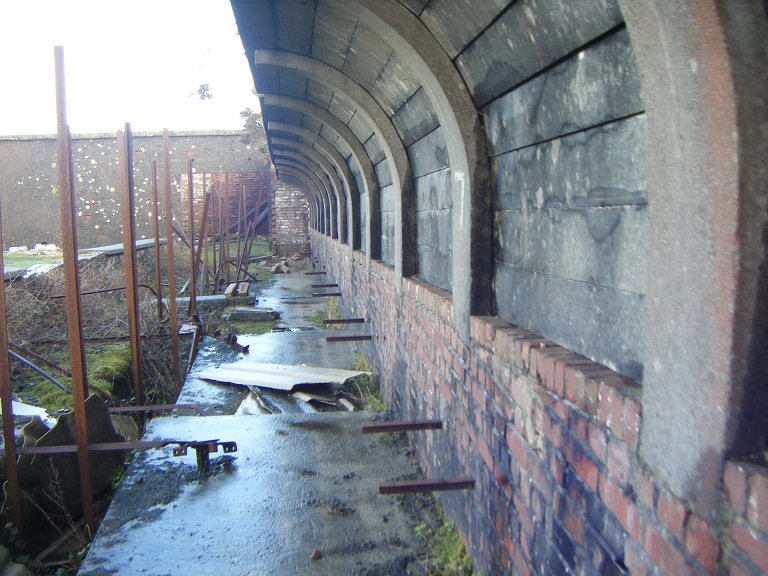
The marker's gallery.

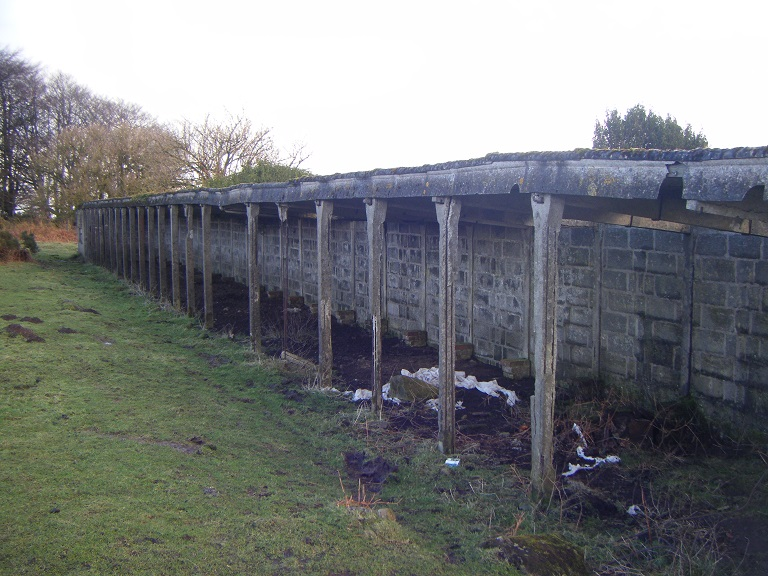
The troop shelter.

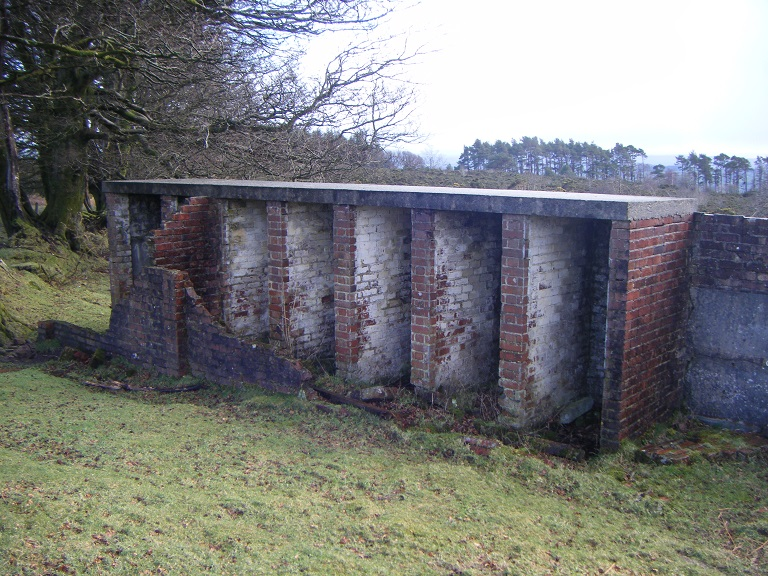
The toilet block.

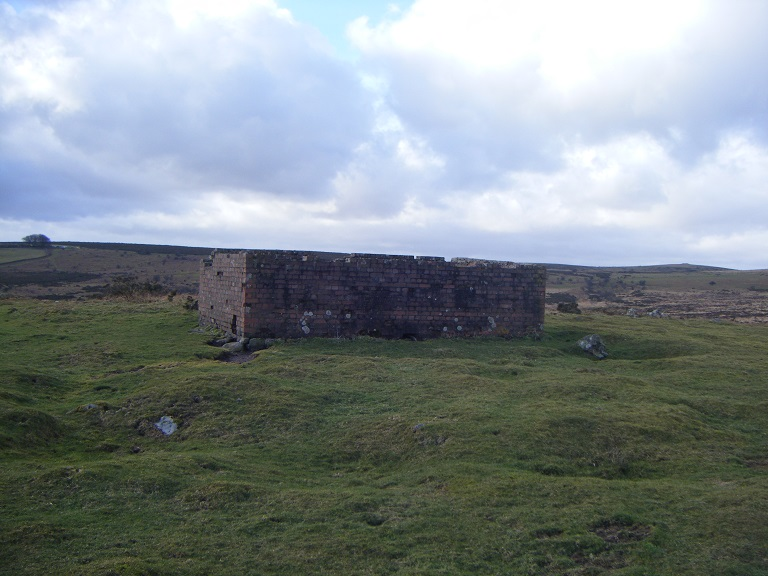
The remains of the water storage building.

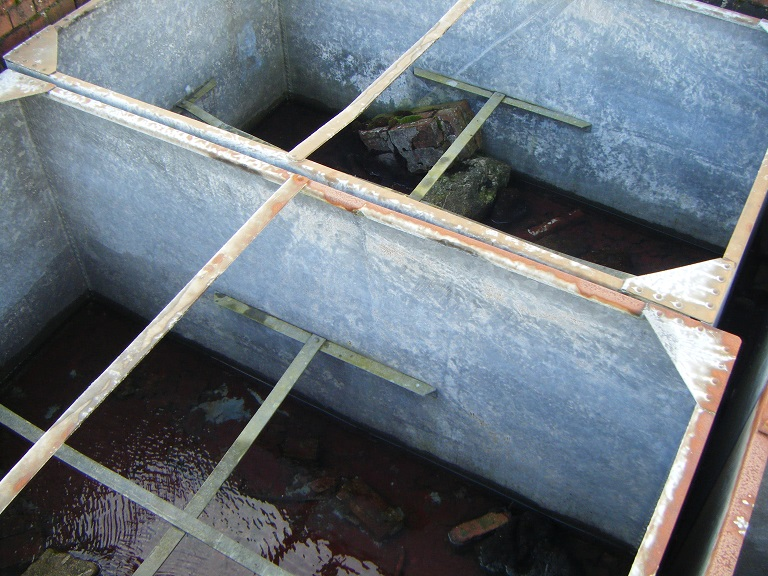
Two of the water storage galvanised tanks.
