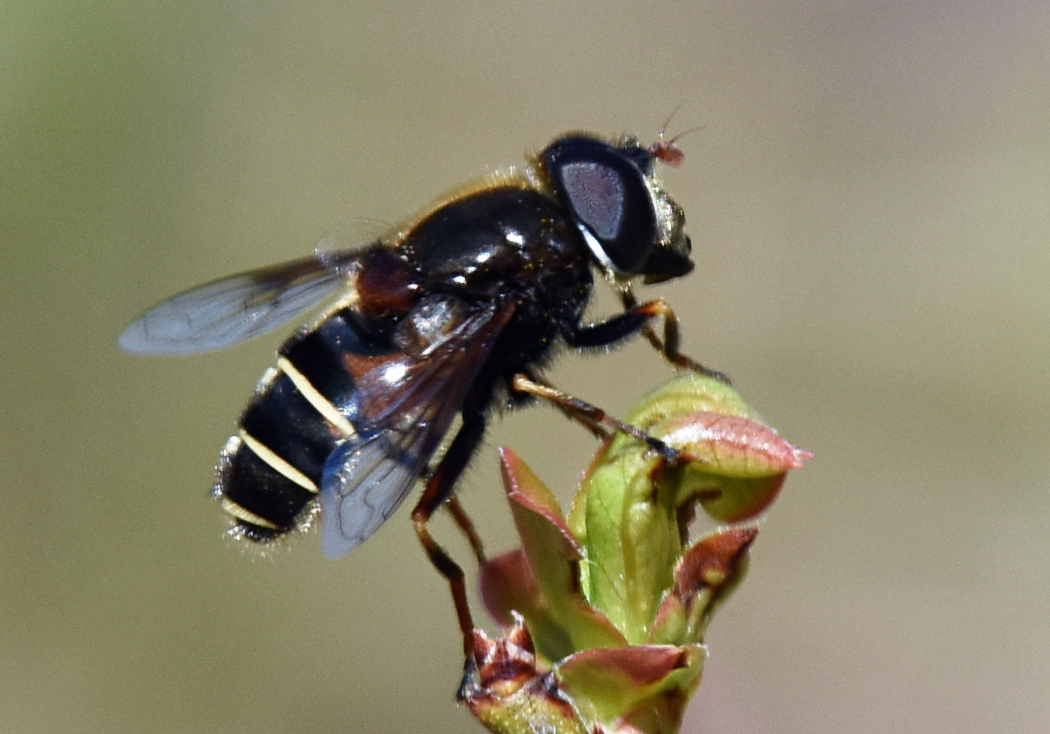

Scientific classification
- Kingdom: Animalia
- Phylum: Arthropoda
- Class: Insecta
- Order: Diptera
- Family: Syrphidae
- Genus: Eristalis
- Subgenus: Eoseristalis
- Species: E. cryptarum

Binomial name
- Eristalis cryptarum (Fabricius, 1794)

Synonyms
- Eristalis nubilipennis Curtis, 1832; Syrphus cryptarum Fabricius, 1794; Eristalis compactus

= Eristalis cryptarum =

Species of fly

Eristalis cryptarum is a holarctic species of hoverfly. Known as the bog hoverfly or bog-dwelling drone fly, it is a bog specialist but may occur in other wetlands. Its larvae are assumed to live in peat that is saturated with water, such as that found in these boggy areas. The female has been observed depositing eggs on and close to very fresh cow dung along oligotrophic seepages in moorland.

Hoverflies get their names from the ability to remain nearly motionless while in flight. The adults are also known as flower flies for they are commonly found around and on flowers from which they get both energy-giving nectar and protein rich pollen. The larvae are aquatic filter-feeders of the rat-tailed type.

E. cryptarum has a wide distribution across central and Northern Europe and East to Siberia and Mongolia. In England, it was once found in all southwestern counties as far east as the New Forest, but since the middle of the 20th century its range has contracted, for unknown reasons, and it is only now found at a few sites on Dartmoor, Devon. In Denmark it is considered critically endangered, possibly extinct.

== Description ==
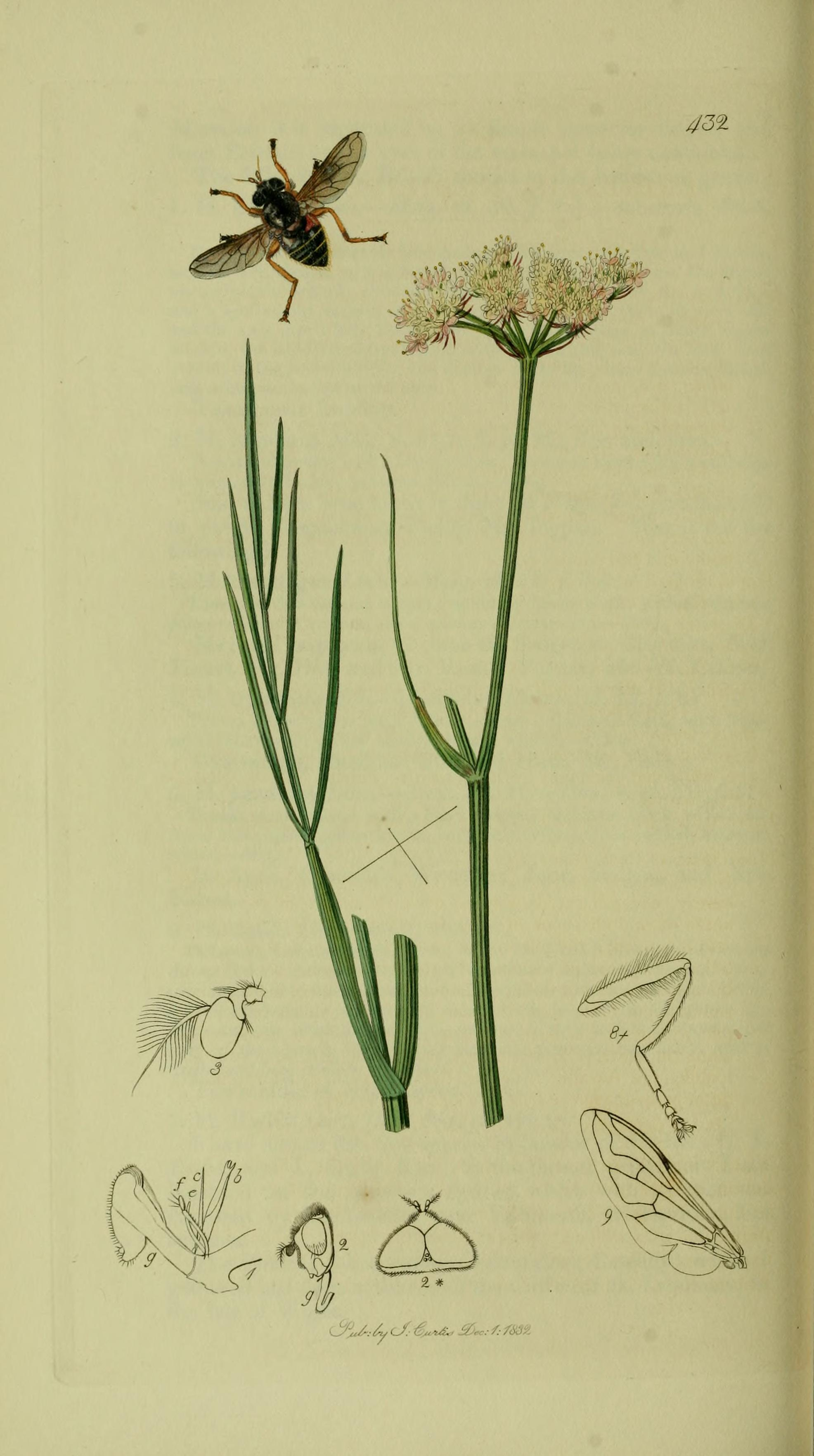

For terms see Morphology of Diptera.

Length

9–13 mm (0.4–0.5 in)

Head

The front or frons in female is yellow pilose below, on the sides lightly pollinose above, clothed with black pile. The pile yellowish on front and vertex and black about the ocelli, sometimes black on the front likewise. The face has a black ground color that is lightly covered with whitish pollen and pile on the sides. The black facial stripe is wide on a pronounced tubercle. The cheeks (gena) are shining black. The face is rather produced below. The third joint of the antennae (flagellum) is unusually large and bright reddish-orange. The arista is bare. The eyes are wholly lightly pilose. The occiput is black above and white below.

Thorax

The scutum is dark shining brown with reddish pile on the sides. The scutellum is reddish with black pile, along the border the pile is reddish. The pleurae are mostly black pilose.

Abdomen

Second segment of the abdomen on the sides with roughly triangular reddish-orange, or brownish red that extending across between, a shining fascia, not interrupted in the middle, the black elsewhere deep opaque. The hind border is yellow. The pile on spots of second segment is bright golden red. The third segment and also the fourth are wholly shining black except for their yellow hind border. The posterior part of the third segment, however, is less distinctly so, more subopaque. The hypopygium, or fifth segment is wholly shining black with long white pile.

Wings

Wings hyaline with black veins. The anterior part as far as the cross-vein, and reaching a little into the base of the second basal cell is tinted brown. The wings also have a brownish band on the anterior basal portion. Diagnostic veination: Spurious vein (sv) present, R_{4+5} looping into cell r_{4+5}, r_{2+3}. closed cell anterior cross- vein (r-m) near the middle of discal cell (dm) is oblique.

Legs

The legs are reddish with black pile.
The basal part of femora black and the last three joints of tarsi are black. The hind femora are black and not thickened. The tibia are orange with yellow basally. The male genitalia are figured by Hippa et al. (2001) The larva is undescribed.

Eristalis wing

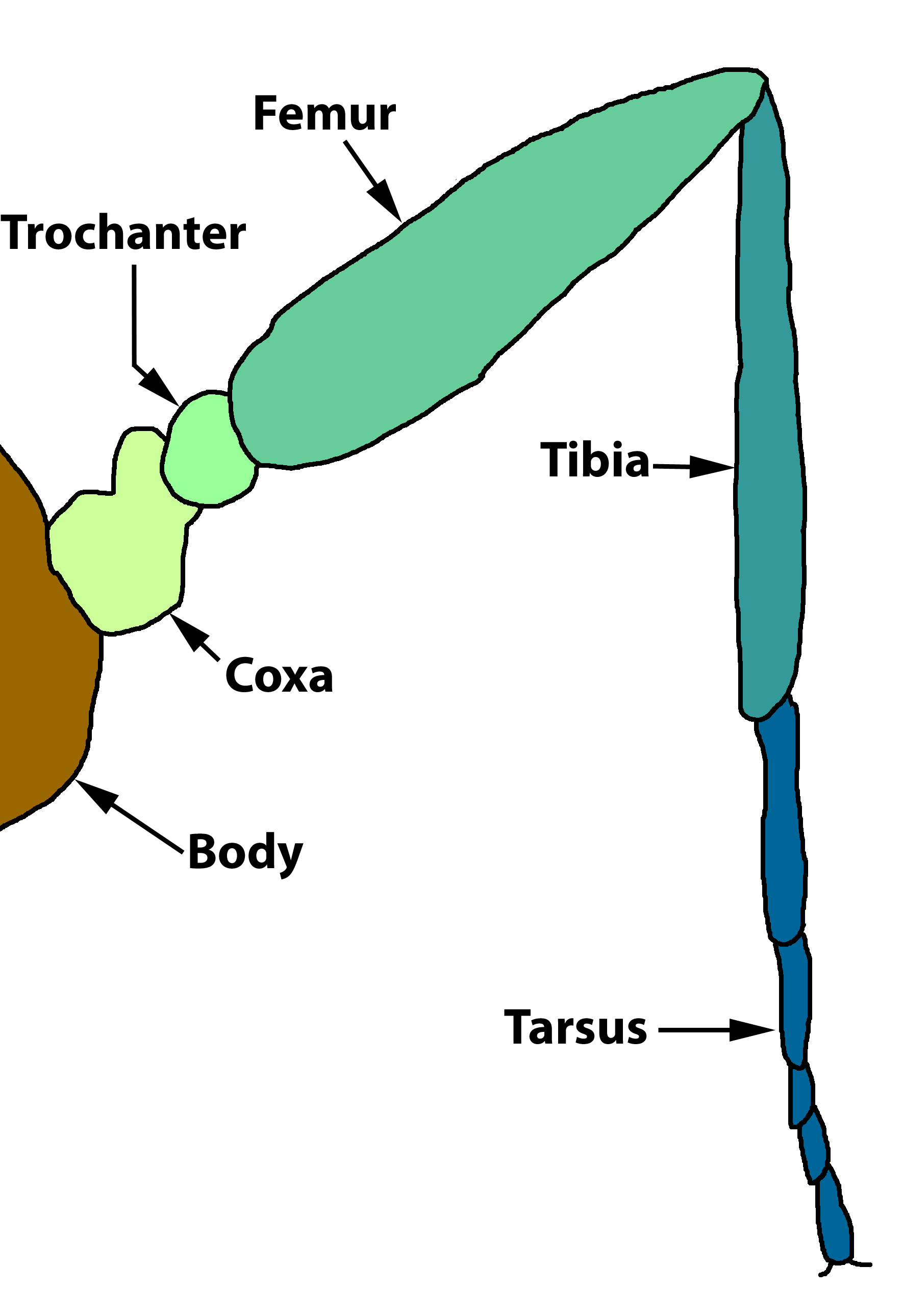
Insect leg

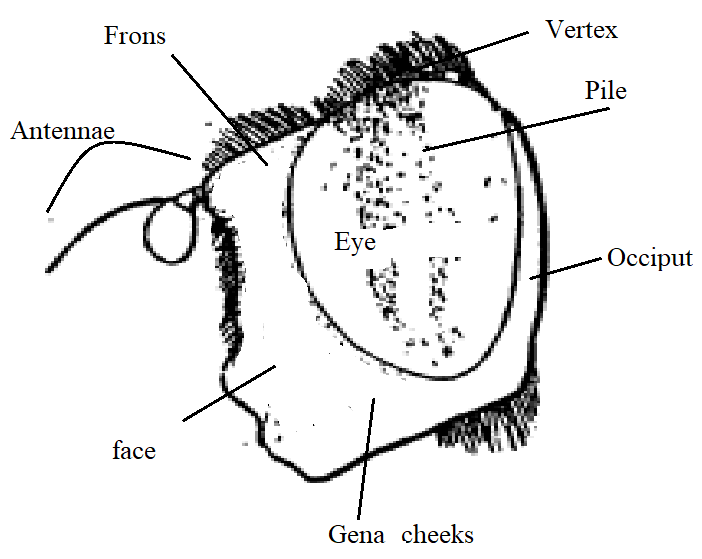
Eristalis head

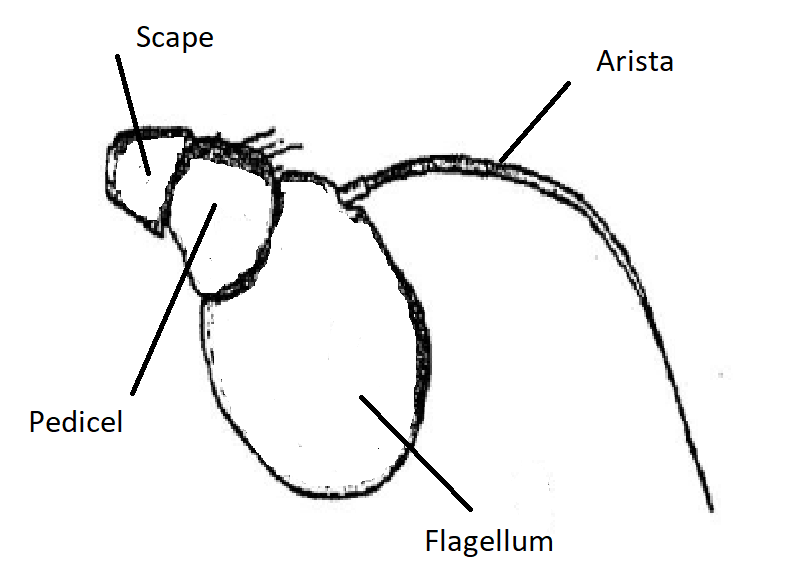
Syrphid antenna

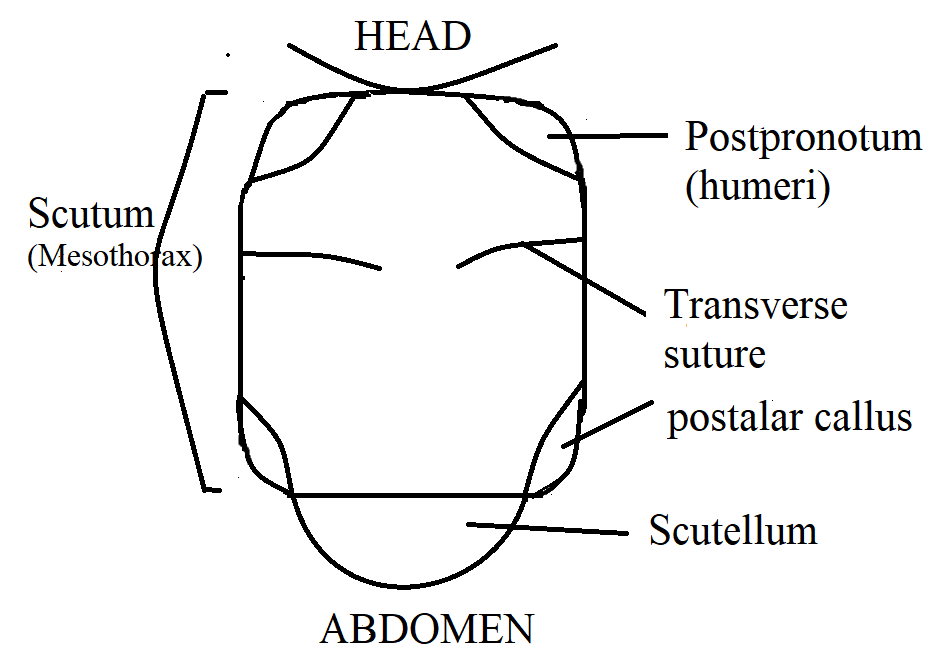
Dorsal view of Syrphid thorax
