= Yes Tor =

Second highest point on Dartmoor

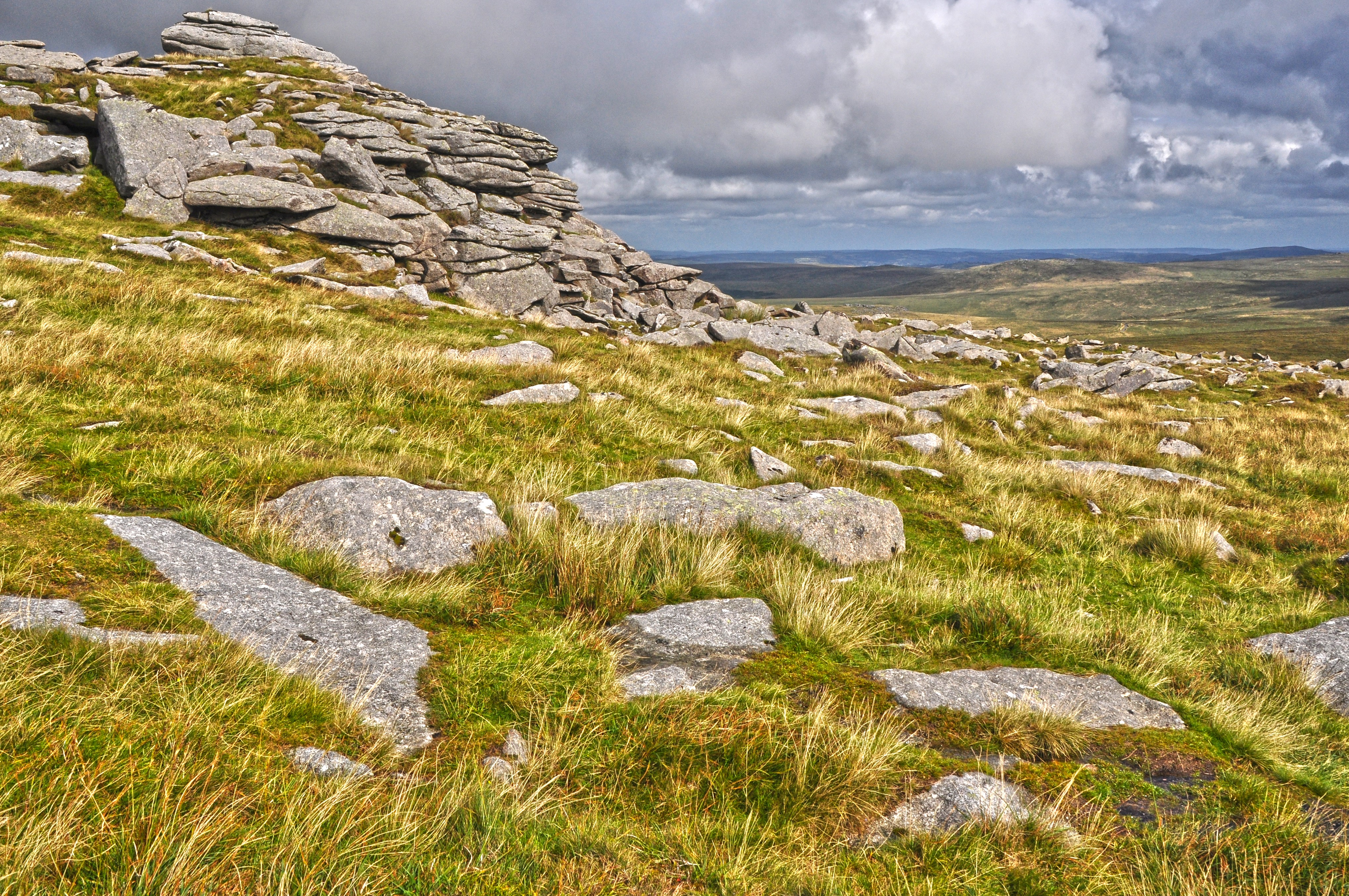
- Yes Tor

Highest point
- Elevation: 619 m (2,031 ft)
- Prominence: 24 m (79 ft)
- Listing: Nuttall
- Coordinates: 50°41′35″N 4°00′43″W

Geography
- Location within Devon
- Location: Dartmoor, England
- OS grid: SX580901
- Topo map: OS Landranger 191

Yes Tor /ˈjɛs/ is the second highest point on Dartmoor, Devon, South West England, at 619 metres (2,031 ft) above sea level. It is one of only three wholly English peaks south of the Peak District National Park—the other two being the nearby High Willhays, and Black Hill in Herefordshire—that are above 2,000 feet (610 m). The name means "eagle's tor", from Old English earnes torr.

Because the summit lies within an active British Army firing range, public access is strictly regulated and permitted only on days or nights when firing is not taking place, as per the current Dartmoor Firing Notice.

Yes Tor is 2 metres (7 feet) lower than the nearby High Willhays.

== In popular culture ==
Literature

- In his memoir Father and Son (1907), Edmund Gosse views Yes Tor, near which he lived when a boy, as an unthreatening and unprepossessing hill: "Alas! We might as well have attempted to rouse the summit of Yes Tor into volcanic action."
- The American science fiction author Kim Stanley Robinson makes an oblique reference to Yes Tor in his novel 2312, commingled with a variety of then-historical musical contextual clues.

Music

- Yes Tor was the original inspiration for the name of the Yes album Tormato and a picture of the Tor features on the album cover, and a topographic map on the inner sleeve. The planned name for the album was Yes Tor until Rick Wakeman, or more probably Hipgnosis designer Aubrey Powell, vandalised the prototype artwork using a ripe tomato.

New religious movements

- The Aetherius Society considers it to be one of its 19 holy mountains.
