= West Buckfastleigh =

Civil parish in Devon, England

Coordinates: 50.49°N 3.83°W

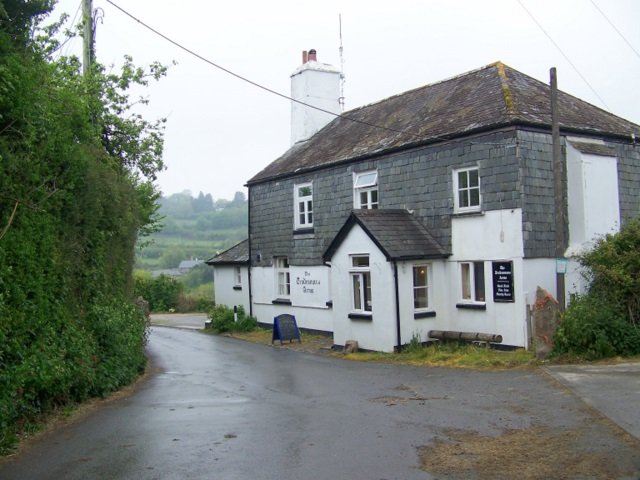
- The Tradesman's Arms in Scorriton

- Location within Devon
- Population: 301 (2011 census)
- Civil parish: West Buckfastleigh
- District: South Hams
- Shire county: Devon
- Region: South West
- Country: England
- Sovereign state: United Kingdom

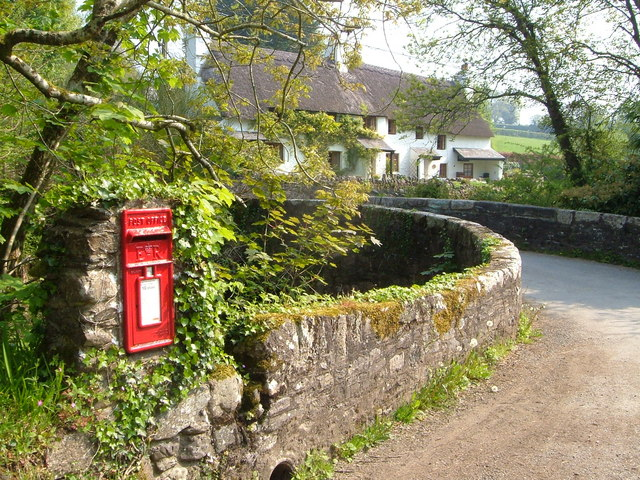
Bridge at Combe.

West Buckfastleigh is a small civil parish in the South Hams district, on the eastern border of Dartmoor in Devon, England. Situated within the parish are the village of Scorriton and the hamlets of Michelcombe and Combe. In 2011 it had a population of 301.

== Description ==
West Buckfastleigh is a civil parish located at the eastern fringes of Dartmoor, and lies inside of the borders of the National Park. The majority of the parish is farmland. The parallel valleys of the Holy Brook and the River Mardle run through the parish.

It is crossed by the ancient track known as Abbots' Way.

== Location ==
Starting north and going with the clock, the neighbouring parishes are Holne, Ashburton, Buckfastleigh, Dean Prior and Dartmoor Forest. West Buckfastleigh lies within the local government district of South Hams, unlike the parish with which it shares the majority of its name, Buckfastleigh, which is in Teignbridge.

== History ==
The parish was formed on 31 December 1894 from the rural part of "Buckfastleigh", the part in Buckfastleigh Urban District became "East Buckfastleigh" but was renamed "Buckfastleigh" as a successor parish.
