= Hembury Castle, Buckfast =

Iron Age hill fort in Devon, England

Coordinates: 50.5018°N 3.7978°W

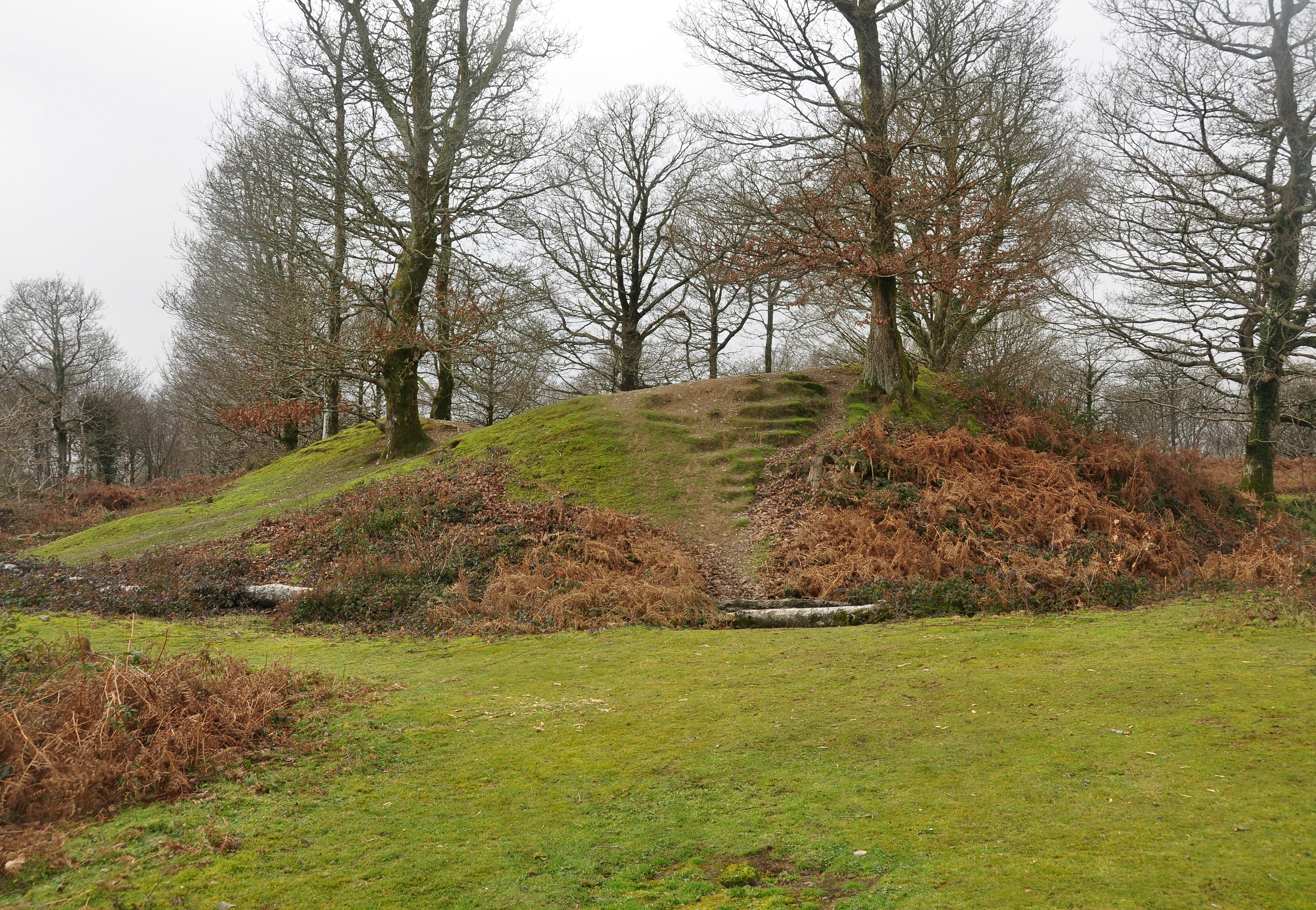
The motte inside Hembury Castle

Hembury Castle is an Iron Age hillfort about a mile north-west of the village of Buckfast on the south-eastern edge of Dartmoor in Devon, England (grid reference SX726684). The fort is about 178 metres above sea level on a promontory between the River Dart on the east and the Holy Brook, south-west. The slope down to the River Dart is very steep and is covered by Hembury Woods which is now a Site of Special Scientific Interest.

The fort is said to cover about seven acres and it is surrounded by a prominent rampart and ditch. It is one of several Iron Age forts on the eastern edge of Dartmoor, others include Holne Chase Castle, Wooston Castle, Cranbrook Castle and Prestonbury Castle. Inside the fort, on the western side, is an 11th- or 12th-century motte with a surrounding narrow inner bailey. The ramparts of the earlier hillfort may have been used as the outer bailey of the castle. The entire site has legal protection as a scheduled monument.

The first documentary reference to Hembury Castle is in the 13th-century cartulary of nearby Buckfast Abbey, where it is referred to as vetus castellum quod dicitur Hembire. The name probably derives from Old English hean byrig, "at the high burh".

A legend relates that the fort was held by the Danes, but it was taken from them by a stratagem. Some local women allowed themselves to be captured by the Danes and taken into the fort, but in the night when their captors were in a drunken sleep, the women rose, killed them and let in their countrymen.
