= Sampford Spiney =

Village in Devon, England

Coordinates: 50.533037°N 4.0709581°W

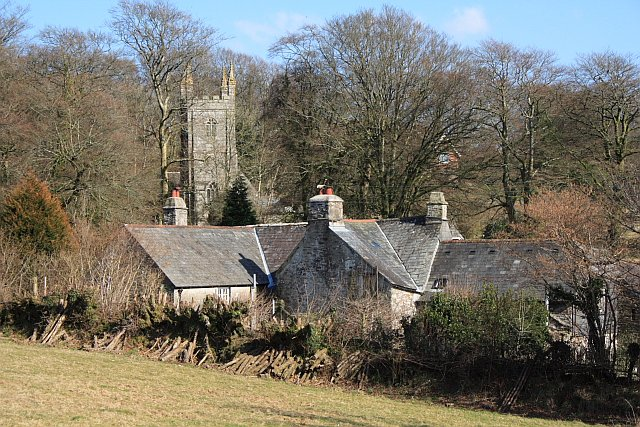
- St Mary's Church

- Location within Devon
- Area: 5.9239 km^{2} (2.2872 sq mi)
- Population: 117 (2011 census)
  - Density: 20/km^{2} (52/sq mi)
- Civil parish: Sampford Spiney
- District: West Devon
- Shire county: Devon
- Region: South West
- Country: England
- Sovereign state: United Kingdom
- Police: Devon and Cornwall
- Fire: Devon and Somerset
- Ambulance: South Western

Sampford Spiney is a village and civil parish in the Walkham valley, about 4 miles east south east of Tavistock, in the West Devon district, in the county of Devon, England. In 2011 the parish had a population of 117. The parish includes the hamlet of Woodtown. The parish borders Walkhampton, Whitchurch and Horrabridge.

== Features ==
There are 26 listed buildings in Sampford Spiney, of which the church is Grade I listed.

== History ==
Sampford Spiney was recorded in the Domesday Book as Sandford/Sandforda. The name "Sampford" means 'Sandy ford', with the "Spiney" part being a family name of which the Spiney family held Sampford Spiney in the 13th century. On the 1st of October 1950 Horrabridge became a separate parish, the transferred area contained 135 acres. The parish was historically in the Roborough hundred.
