= Roborough Hundred =

Ancient administrative unit of Devon, England

The hundred of Roborough was the name of one of thirty-two ancient administrative units of Devon, England. It was named after an ancient location of its hundred court in Roborough, South Hams, near Plymouth. (A different Roborough (Roborough, Torridge), was within Fremington Hundred.)

The parishes in the hundred were:

- Bere Ferrers
- Bickleigh (near Plymouth)
- Buckland Monachorum
- East Stonehouse
- Eggbuckland
- Maker (in Cornwall from 1844)
- Meavy
- Pennycross
- Peter Tavy
- Plymouth: Charles the Martyr
- Plymouth: St Andrew
- Sampford Spiney
- Sheepstor
- St Budeaux
- Stoke Damerel
- Tamerton Foliot
- Walkhampton
- Whitchurch.

== See also ==
- List of hundreds of England and Wales - Devon
- Inspeximus: Poetry from the Manors of The Roborough Hundred by Ruth Snell ISBN 978-1-78132-302-1 (2014) SilverWood Books Bristol
