= Crazywell Pool =

Lake in Devon, England, UK

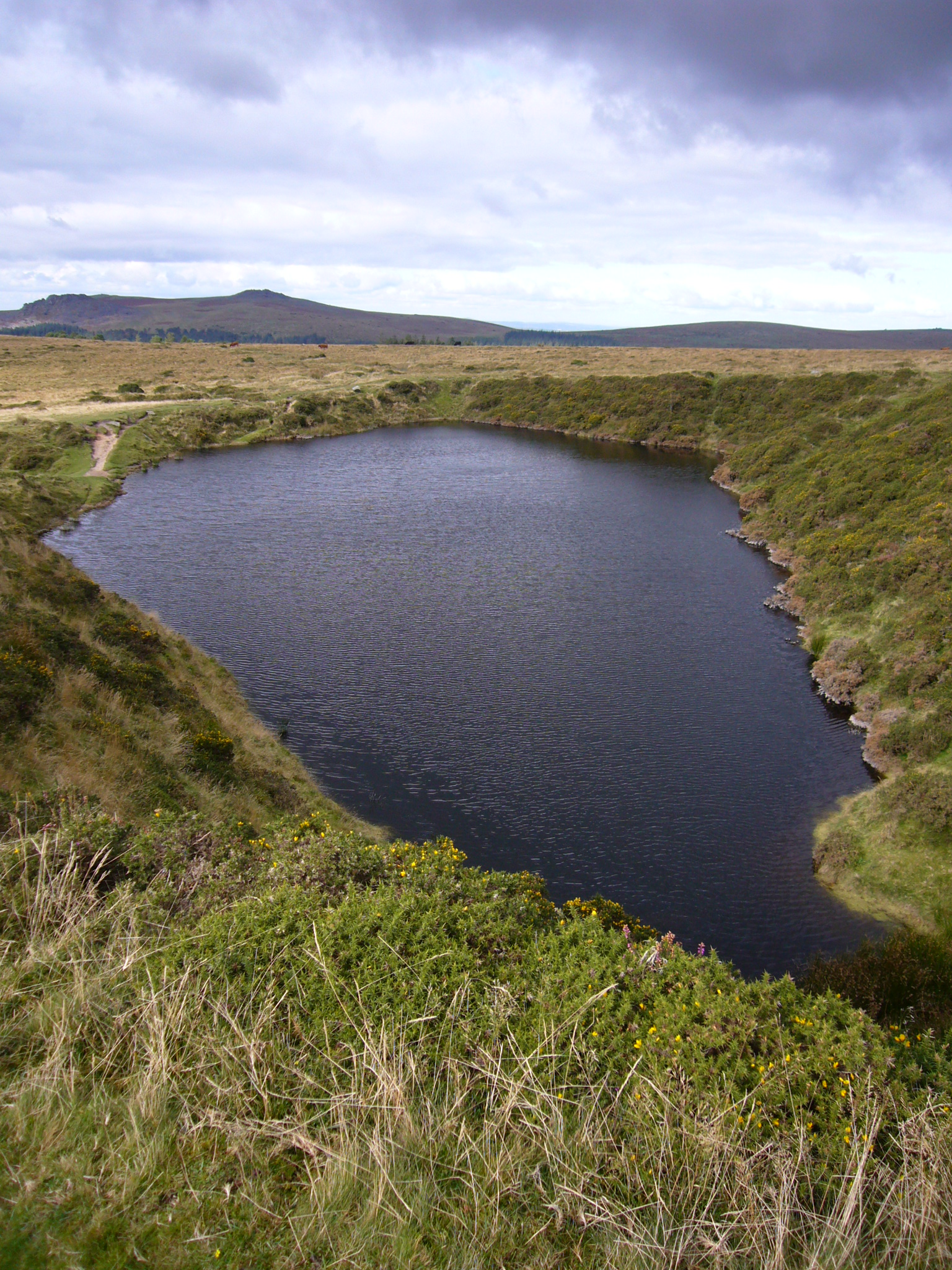

- Location within Devon
- Location: Princetown, Devon
- Coordinates: 50.51706°N 4.00150°W
- Basin countries: United Kingdom
- Surface area: 3,500 m^{2} (0.86 acres)
- Max. depth: 16 ft (4.9 m)

Crazywell Pool or Crazy Well Pool is a large pond situated about 3 km (1.9 mi) south of Princetown just off the path between Burrator and Whiteworks on the western side of Dartmoor, Devon, England at grid reference SX582705. It is about 100 metres (110 yd) long and has a surface area of about 3,500 square metres (0.86 acres).

The pool is thought to be the result of excavations by tin miners, and is either a flooded mine shaft, or a reservoir. The presence of tin workings downhill from the pool support this view. The valley of Newleycombe Lake has been extensively worked with many mining remains along its short length. The level of the pool never varies much from its mean—it is maintained by a hidden spring and by subterranean drainage at its lower end. Near to the pool is Crazywell Cross, one of the line of crosses that marked the ancient track between Buckfast Abbey and Tavistock Abbey.

In 1998, Nathaniel Burton, a sixteen-year-old recruit in the Royal Marines, died in Crazywell Pool. He was taking part in a routine training exercise and drowned while crossing the icy waters of the pool.

== Legends ==
There are no natural lakes on Dartmoor, which may be one reason why Crazywell Pool has attracted more than its share of local legends. It was once believed to be bottomless, and according to local legend the parishioners of Walkhampton (or Sheepstor) brought up the bell ropes from the parish church to test its depth. Even after tying the ropes together—a total length of over 500 feet—and weighting the end, it was claimed they were still unable to reach the bottom. This legend was disproved in the dry summer of 1844 when the pool was almost completely pumped out by the Plymouth Dock Water Company to supplement the water supply of Devonport Leat which runs along the hillside not far above the pool. The reality is that the pool is about 16-foot (4.9 m) deep at the western end and considerably less at the eastern end.

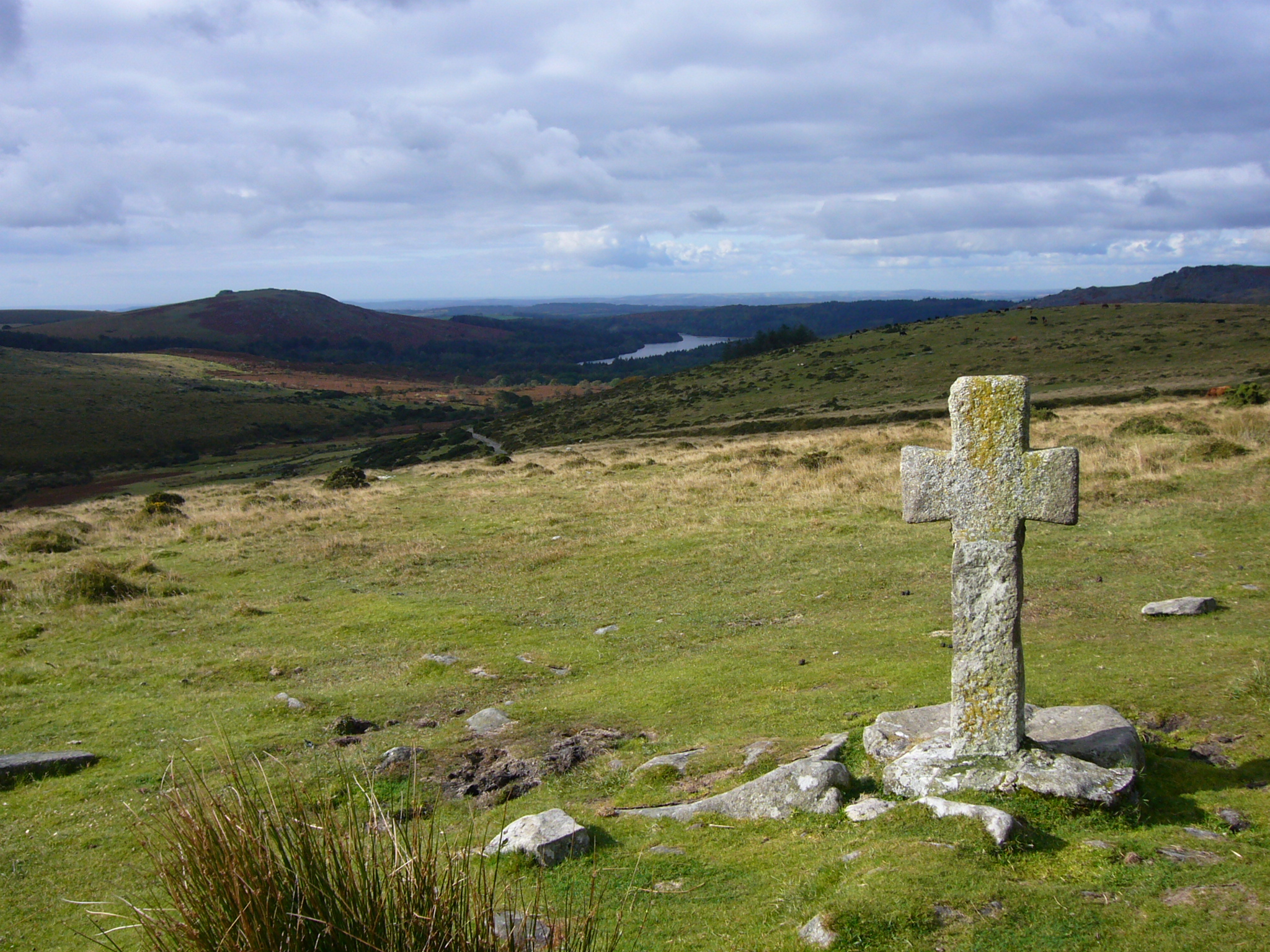
The ancient cross next to the pool

Crazywell Pool is the subject of other Dartmoor superstitions. The water level was said to rise and fall with the tides at sea, and it was claimed that at dusk the waters call out the name of the next parishioner to die and that their face can be seen in the surface of the pool at midnight on Midsummer's Eve.

The pool was also said to be haunted during the Middle Ages by the Witch of Sheepstor, who gave people bad advice. Legend says she advised Piers Gaveston, who owned the Forest of Dartmoor from 1308, and who was in hiding here after being banished from the king's court, telling him to return to court, predicting that "his humbled head shall soon be high". Instead, he was captured by the king's enemies and beheaded and his head was set up on high battlements.

More recently, two young men were said to have gone to the pool at midnight one Midsummer's Eve on a motorbike for a dare, but they never returned because on their way back the motorbike came off the road, killing them both.

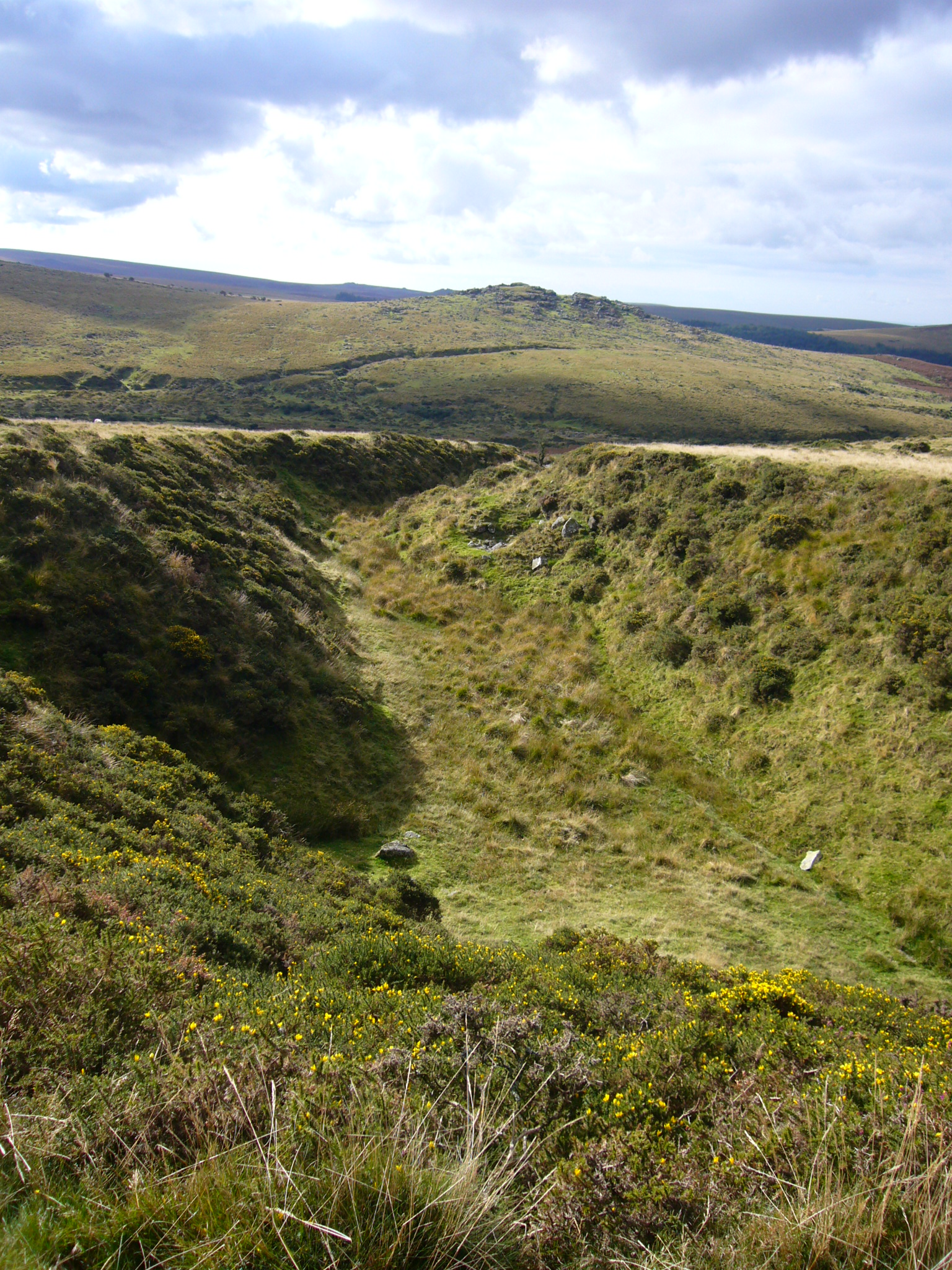
Mine working below the pool
