= Whitchurch, Devon =

Village in Devon, England

Coordinates: 50°32′02″N 4°07′49″W

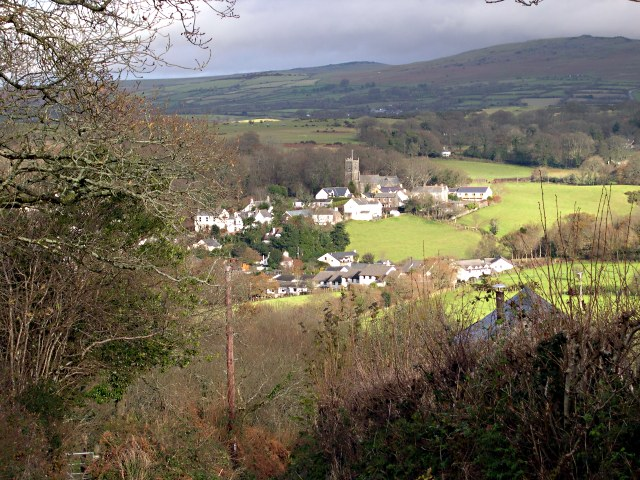
Whitchurch village

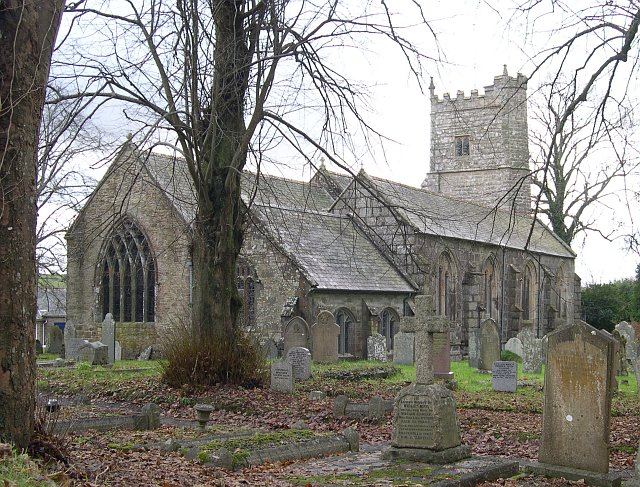
Whitchurch Church

Whitchurch is a suburban village and civil parish to the south-east of the town of Tavistock, Devon, England. It lies in the West Devon local authority area, and within Tavistock Deanery for ecclesiastical purposes. The village itself is no longer in the civil parish, having been absorbed into Tavistock in 1930, leaving the parish of Whitchurch just covering the rural areas south-east of the town. Historically, Whitchurch formed part of the Roborough Hundred.

== History ==
It is believed that a church must have been present in Whitchurch as early as the 11th century, and that it was most likely built from the white elvan that can be found at Roborough Down only a few miles away. This may be the derivation of the name of the village ("White-church"), though many other English villages bearing the same name are considered to be thus named simply because their churches were either built of stone, or were whitewashed. The main church currently standing in Whitchurch—St. Andrew—is for the most part a 15th-century building made from granite as well as elvan. Many memorials can be found in the church, including a monument to Francis Pengelly (1722) made by John Weston of Exeter showing a "celestial ballet" on a medallion, and also an early 17th-century slate slab to the Mooringes of Moortown.

Year	Population
1801	478
1901	1508

There are several interesting houses within the parish. Walreddon Manor is a Grade I listed country house built in the reign of Edward VI by the Courtenay family. The 17th century heiress Mary Fitz (widow of Sir Richard Grenville) was born there. On her death in 1671, the manor was inherited by her cousin, Sir William Courtenay. It stayed in ownership of the Courtenay family until 1953. In the late 1800s, the manor was let to the explorer and colonial administrator Edward John Eyre. Later residents include the film director Hugh Hudson, and, since 2001, the Conservative MP Zac Goldsmith.

The so-called Priory, near the church, is a 19th-century granite building incorporating a square 4th century entrance tower from an earlier structure.

== Governance ==
There are three tiers of local government for the civil parish of Whitchurch, at parish, district and county level: Plasterdown Grouped Parish Council, West Devon Borough Council and Devon County Council. The parish council is a grouped parish council covering the two civil parishes of Whitchurch and Sampford Spiney.

Whitchurch was an ancient parish. The village of Whitchurch was transferred into the urban district of Tavistock in 1930, but it was not considered appropriate for the whole parish of Whitchurch to be included in an urban district. The residual rural parts of the parish were therefore not transferred to Tavistock and continued to form a parish called Whitchurch, despite no longer including the village after which it was named.
