= Hembury Woods =

Woodland in Devon, England

Coordinates: 50°30′18″N 3°47′36″W

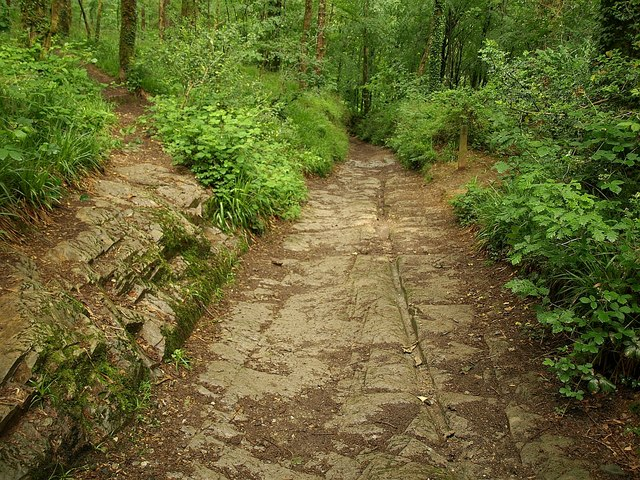
Hembury Woods

Hembury Woods is a Site of Special Scientific Interest within Dartmoor National Park in Devon, England. It is located 3km northwest of Buckfastleigh within the valley of the River Dart. The Iron Age hill fort called Henbury Castle (a scheduled ancient monument) is located within this protected area.

== Biology ==
Hembury Woods is largely composed of semi-natural woodland dominated by pedunculate oak. Tree species also include silver birch and alder. Understorey plants include common gorse, holly, hazel. Herb species include bluebell, wood sage, bilberry, common cow-wheat, wood spurge, primrose, wood anemone and wild daffodil. Royal fern has also been recorded here. Habitats in this protected area also includes heath and grassland where there is a population of autumn hawkbit.

Lichen species include Fuscopannaria sampaiana and also Phlyctis agelaea (that occurs on beech trees).

Bat species recorded as roosting in this protected area include greater horseshoe bat and lesser horseshoe bat.

== Geology ==
Hembury Woods is located on the slopes between the two valleys cut by the River Dart and its tributary the Holy Brook. Underlying soils are derived from the shales, slates and grits of the upper Devonian and Carboniferous Culm Measures.

== Land ownership ==
All land within this protected area is owned by the National Trust who refer to the site as Henbury and Holne Woods.
