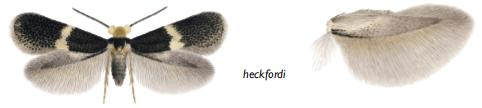
- male and male hindwing
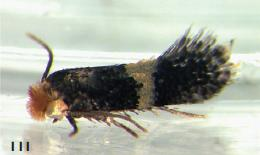

Scientific classification
- Kingdom: Animalia
- Phylum: Arthropoda
- Clade: Pancrustacea
- Class: Insecta
- Order: Lepidoptera
- Family: Nepticulidae
- Genus: Ectoedemia
- Species: E. heckfordi

Binomial name
- Ectoedemia heckfordi van Nieukerken, A. & Z. Lastuvka, 2009

= Ectoedemia heckfordi =

Species of moth

Ectoedemia heckfordi is a moth of the family Nepticulidae. It is only known from Devon in Great Britain, having been discovered in 2004 at the National Trust's Hembury Woods by amateur naturalist Bob Heckford, for whom it is named.

The wingspan is 4.8–6.2 mm. Adults are on wing from April to May. There is one generation per year.

The bright green larvae feed on oaks, Quercus petraea and Quercus robur. They mine the leaves of their host plant.

In April 2010, Heckford presented the type specimen to the Natural History Museum in London.

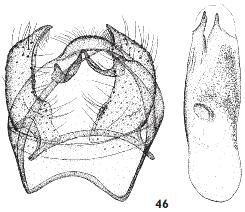
Male genitalia

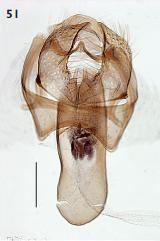
Male genitalia

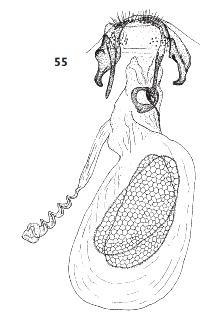
Female genitalia

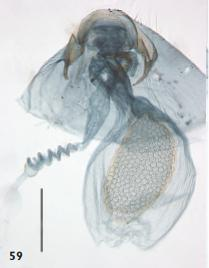
Female genitalia

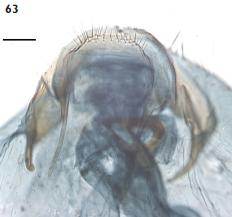
Female terminal abdominal segment

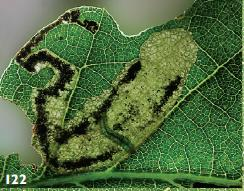
Final instar larva on Quercus petraea

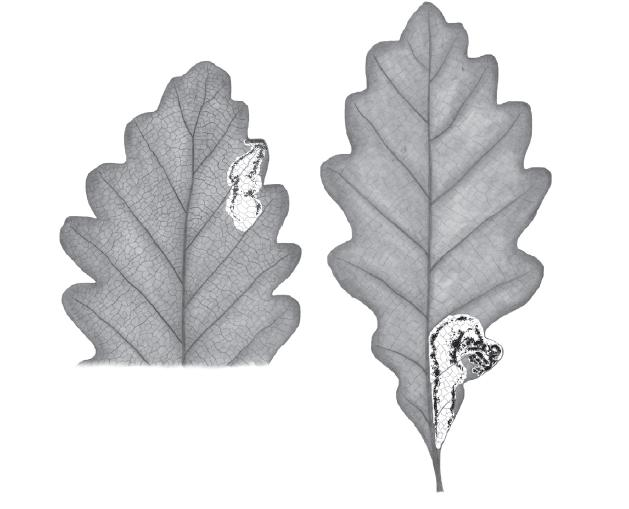
Leafmine
