= Fingle Bridge =

Bridge over the River Teign in Devon, England

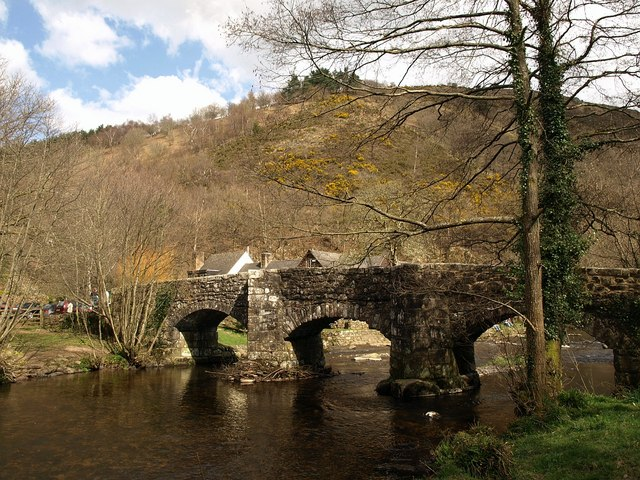
- Fingle bridge viewed from upstream, with the site of Prestonbury Castle behind
- Coordinates: 50.69551°N 3.78100°W
- Carries: Unclassified road
- Crosses: River Teign
- Locale: Devon
- Preceded by: Dogmarsh Bridge
- Followed by: Clifford Bridge

Characteristics
- Design: Arch bridge
- Material: Granite
- Piers in water: 2

History
- Construction end: 17th century

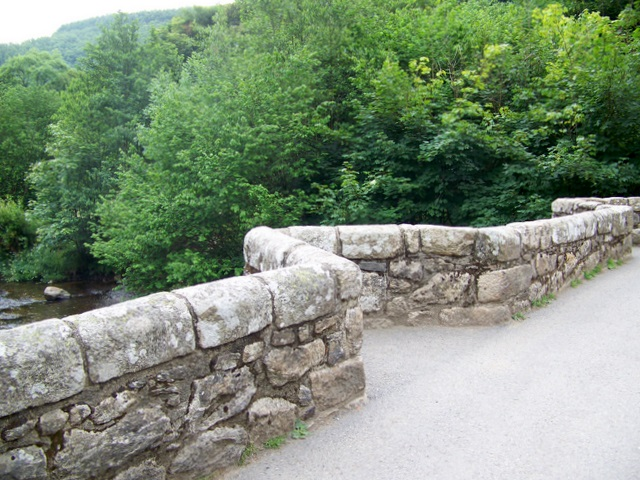
A closer detail of the bridge deck and wall

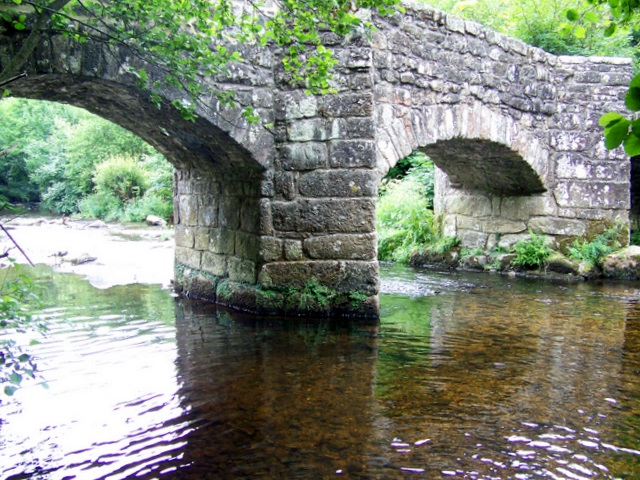
A closer view of the ashlar stone piers from upstream

Fingle Bridge is a 17th-century stone arch bridge carrying an unclassified road over the River Teign near Drewsteignton, within Dartmoor National Park in Devon, England. This packhorse bridge has three arches and the two central piers are surrounded by triangular cutwaters extending upwards to form pedestrian refuges, and is a Grade II* listed building.

== History ==
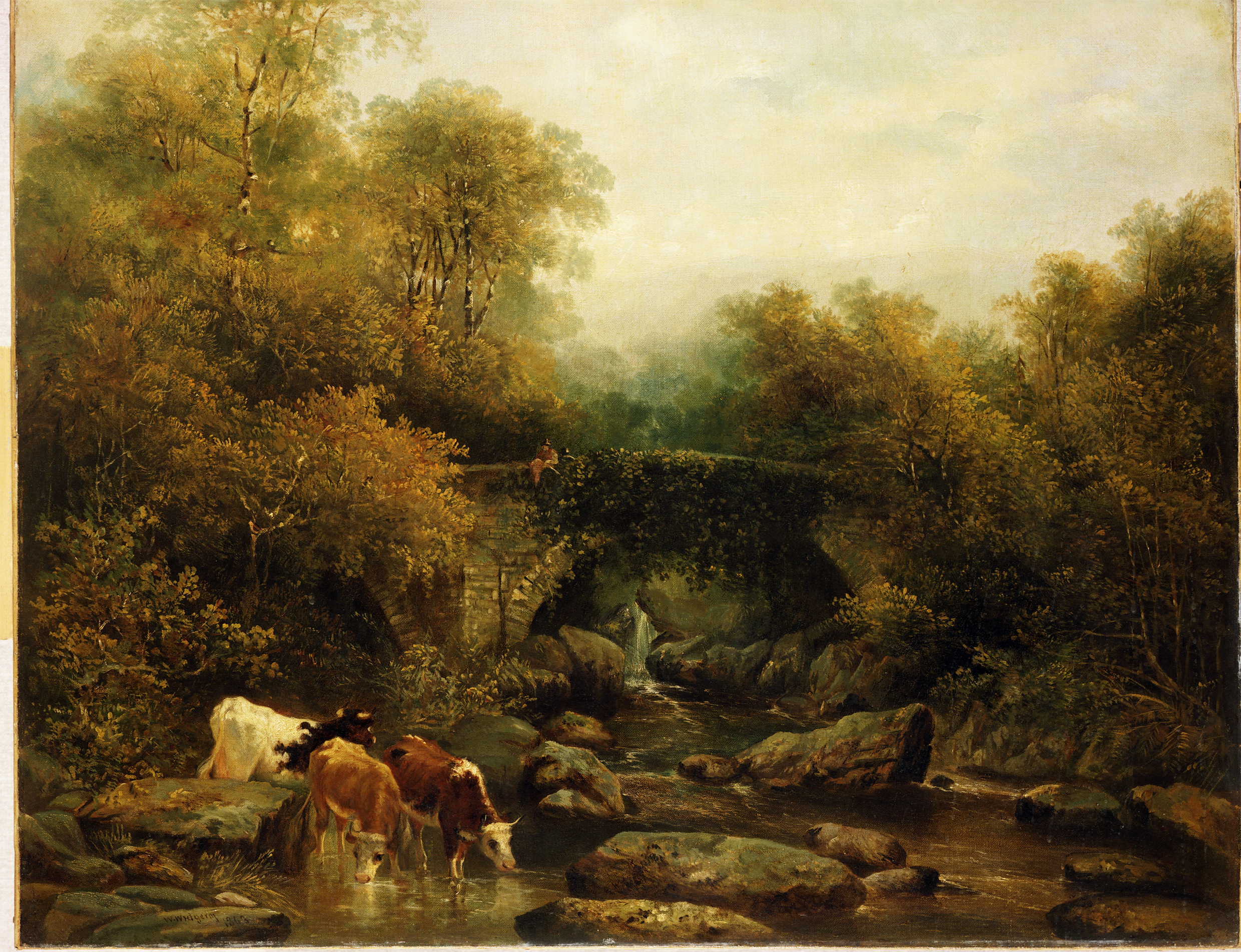
Fingle Bridge painted in 1863 by William Widgery of Exeter

Fingle Bridge takes its name from Fingle Brook, a minor tributary which flows into the Teign adjacent to the bridge. Fingle is derived from the old English "fang", meaning to catch, a reference to the suitability of the stretch of river for fishing. The arches of the bridge were repaired, it is believed by English Heritage during the 19th century.

The bridge sits in the base of the deep Teign Gorge, between the ancient hillforts of Prestonbury Castle 130 metres (430 ft) above the river to the north and Cranbrook Castle 230 metres (750 ft) above to the south, and the bridge is built on the historic crossing point between the two. In its early years the bridge was an important crossing over the Teign used by packhorses transporting corn and wood products across the gorge, although the track up to Cranbrook Castle is now an unmaintained byway such that the bridge leads only to a car park on the south side of the river for roadgoing vehicles, the bridge's function having been replaced by the larger and more accessible Dogmarsh Bridge further upstream on the A382 road.

In 1897 Jesse Ashplant founded the Fingle Bridge Tea Shelter on the north landing of the bridge, serving refreshments to the fishermen, tourists and grain carriers of the day. This developed into the Anglers' Rest pub and was later renamed as the Fingle Bridge Inn.

In 1955 Fingle Bridge was designated a Grade II listed building, reclassified in 1967 as Grade II*.

== Related buildings ==
Fingle Mill once stood 200 metres (660 ft) downstream, a corn mill recorded as being in operation as early as 1790 by the then owner of the bridge, George Ponsford, powered by a now-defunct 500-metre (1,600 ft) long leat.

The track leading south to Cranbrook Castle is also the site of one of the Dartmoor crosses which is in the style of a granite slab with the cross engraved on it.

== Fiction ==
During May 1903, Bertram Fletcher Robinson had a short story titled The Battle of Fingle's Bridge published in Pearson's Magazine (Vol. XV, pp. 530–536). This is a fairy tale, told by a small boy who falls asleep on a moor and witnesses a battle between the people of the ferns and rushes and the people of the gorse and heather. All these people are only six inches tall and are dressed in medieval garb and armour and have miniature horses and weapons. The boy, aided by a fairy, becomes involved in the battle and finally awakens to find signs of the battle on the moor. This story was illustrated by Nathan Dean.
