= Mardle =

Mardle is a surname. Notable people with the surname include:

- Paul Mardle (born 1962), English discus thrower
- Wayne Mardle (born 1973), English darts player

Also a fictional town in the first episode of Vera_(TV_series)#Series_4_(2014), presumably in Northumberland.

== See also ==
- River Mardle, a river in Devon, England
