= Woodtown =

Hamlet in Devon, England

Coordinates: 50°31′39″N 4°03′41″W

- Location within Devon
- Civil parish: Sampford Spiney
- District: West Devon
- Shire county: Devon
- Region: South West
- Country: England
- Sovereign state: United Kingdom
- Police: Devon and Cornwall
- Fire: Devon and Somerset
- Ambulance: South Western

Woodtown is a hamlet in the civil parish of Sampford Spiney, on Dartmoor, in the West Devon district, in the county of Devon, England. It is roughly half a mile south-east of Sampford Spiney village and lies close to the River Walkham.
