= Combe, Buckfastleigh, Devon =

Village in Devon, England

Coordinates: 50.497°N 3.815°W

Combe
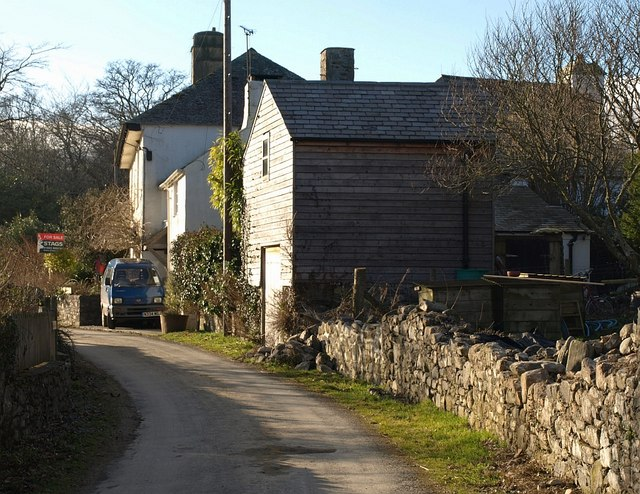
- Lower Combe

- Location within Devon
- OS grid reference: SX7068
- Civil parish: West Buckfastleigh
- District: Teignbridge
- Shire county: Devon
- Region: South West
- Country: England
- Sovereign state: United Kingdom
- Post town: BUCKFASTLEIGH
- Postcode district: TQ11
- Police: Devon and Cornwall
- Fire: Devon and Somerset
- Ambulance: South Western
- UK Parliament: Totnes

Combe is a small village in the county of Devon, England. It lies on the River Mardle about 2 miles north west of the town of Buckfastleigh.
