= Yellowmead stone circle =

Bronze Age stone circle in Devon, England

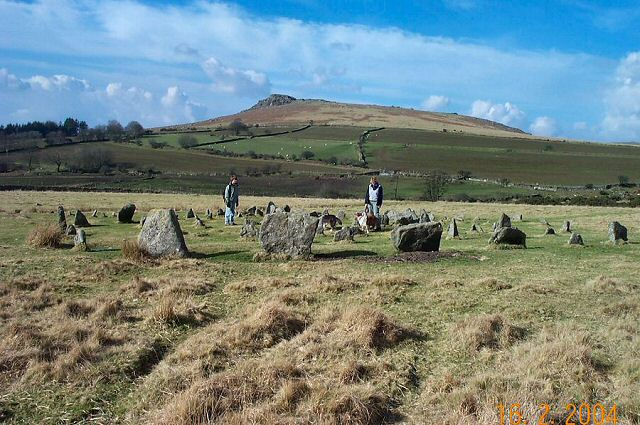

- Location within Devon
- 50.492939°N 4.010564°W
- Type: Stone circle
- Periods: Bronze Age
- Location: Sheepstor
- OS grid reference: SX57486783

Site notes
- Public access: Yes

Yellowmead stone circle near Sheepstor in Devon, England, is a Bronze Age concentric stone circle consisting of four rings of stones set within one another. The largest is 20 metres wide and the smallest, 6 metres. It is located on Yellowmead Down.

The circles once encircled a burial cairn although this is now barely visible. To the south west, several possible stone rows lead away, crossed by a post-medieval leat that once served a nearby tinworks.

The site was excavated and restored by Rev. H Breton in 1921. In 2008 geophysical surveys and a small excavation were carried out to determine whether the restoration of 1921 had been performed accurately (it had), and to discover whether additional features remain buried in the peat. Fallen stones were found in line with some of the stone rows, suggesting that further features may lie downslope below the leat.
