= Holy Brook, Devon =

River in Devon, England

Holy Brook
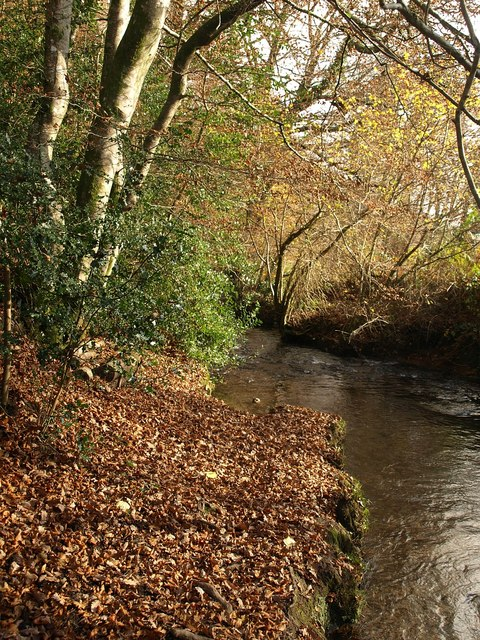
- Holy Brook near Hembury South Gate.

Location
- Country: England
- County: Devon

Physical characteristics
- Source: 50.504°N 3.865°W
  - location: Flank of Snowdon
  - elevation: 330 m (1,080 ft)
- Mouth: 50.496°N 3.776°W
  - location: River Dart
  - elevation: 30 m (98 ft)
- Length: 6 km (3.7 mi)

Holy Brook is a tributary of the River Dart in Devon, England. It rises on the eastern flank of the 495 m (1,624 ft)-high hill of Snowdon on Dartmoor, at grid reference SX678687. It was once a much longer stream, but its headwaters were long ago captured by the River Mardle, and the physical evidence of this stream capture is clear when viewed from higher up the side of Snowdon.

Its course is generally eastwards, and for the first three-quarters of its length it flows roughly parallel to the River Mardle, only about 700 m (about half a mile), north of that river. As Holy Brook comes off the moor, it flows through Gibby Combe Wood and then through Michel Combe, a steep-sided valley (or combe) which is just to the south of the hamlet of Michelcombe. It then passes between the villages of Scorriton (to the south) and Holne, and as it approaches the River Dart it flows through a wooded valley that forms the southern boundary of Hembury Woods, below Hembury Castle. Here it is crossed by the road from Buckfastleigh to Holne at Hembury Bridge, which has a single arch and a parapet topped by flat stones that are joined by iron clamps. From this bridge to its confluence with the River Dart near the grounds of Buckfast Abbey at grid reference SX741677, Holy Brook forms the boundary between the Teignbridge and South Hams districts.

The first known documentary reference to the stream appears in the 13th-century cartulary of Buckfast Abbey, in which it is called Nordbroc and Northbroke ("north brook"), probably because of its course just to the north of the River Mardle.

A report on folklore published by the Devonshire Association in 1976, states that the name "Holy Brook" is not an ancient one, though it notes that two fields named "Paternoster" lie on its course. It has been proved, the report says, that its water is slightly radioactive and, according to the Holne branch of the Women's Institute, it was still believed in 1976 to have curative powers: strained muscles, bruises and rheumatism could all be alleviated by wading in its waters.
