= Horrabridge =

Village in Devon, England

Coordinates: 50.509°N 4.099°W

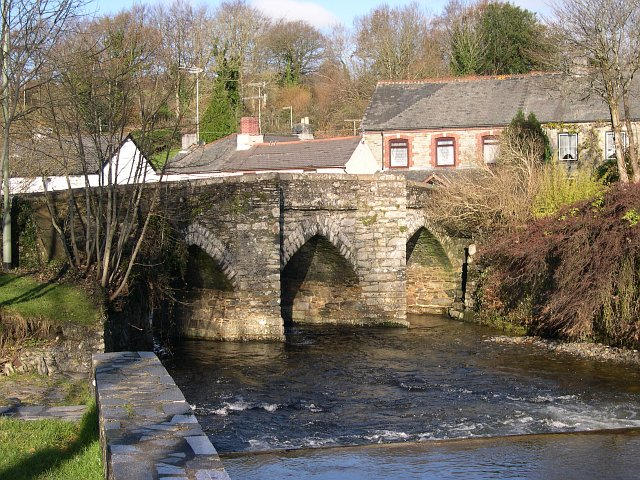
- The packhorse bridge over the River Walkham

- Location within Devon
- Population: 2,199 (2021 census)
- OS grid reference: SX512697
- Civil parish: Horrabridge
- District: West Devon
- Shire county: Devon
- Region: South West
- Country: England
- Sovereign state: United Kingdom
- Post town: YELVERTON
- Postcode district: PL20
- Police: Devon and Cornwall
- Fire: Devon and Somerset
- Ambulance: South Western
- UK Parliament: Torridge and West Devon

Horrabridge is a village and civil parish in the West Devon district, in Devon, England. The village lies approximately 12 miles (19 km) north of the city of Plymouth and 4 miles (6.4 km) south of Tavistock, and is within the Dartmoor National Park. In 2021 the parish had a population of 2,199.

The village sits on the River Walkham, a fishing river famous for its salmon. The village's name may have been taken from the 15th-century packhorse bridge which remains the only vehicular route from one side of the village to the other, and featured in the children's television programme Bagpuss. The bridge is a Grade I listed structure.

Horrabridge has two pubs, the London Inn and The Leaping Salmon, but has lost many of its shops over the last 20 years including a draper, television shop and a general store. The village does however retain its post office, family bakery, hairdresser, florist and newsagent.

Until the beginning of the 20th century, the main industry was the mining of copper and tin. This industry has completely disappeared, leaving a legacy of unmapped mineshafts in the village and the surrounding area. It is a popular starting point for walks on Dartmoor and has become a dormitory village for the adjoining towns.

== Transport ==
The village is on the A386 which is the main road running from Okehampton in the North to Plymouth in the South via Tavistock.

The main bus service is service 1 from Plymouth to Tavistock, operated by Stagecoach seven days a week.

Lomax Tours run coach trips from Horrabridge to places of interest such as Bath Christmas Market, Lyme Regis, RHS Rosemoor flower shows, Sidmouth etc.

There was a Horrabridge station on the South Devon and Tavistock Railway until the line was closed in 1962.

== Sport ==
Horrabridge has a football club associated with it; Horrabridge Rangers Sports Association. The football club has been around for over 100 years and provides an activity for the children of Horrabridge and the surrounding villages of Yelverton, Buckland Monachorum, Crapstone, Meavy and Walkhampton.

== Notable people ==
Musician Seth Lakeman recorded his album Kitty Jay in Horrabridge.

== Twin Towns ==
Horrabridge is twinned with Tilly-sur-Seulles in Normandy and the Twinning Association has existed since 1974.
