= Dartmoor crosses =

Series of stone crosses found in Dartmoor National Park in Devon, England

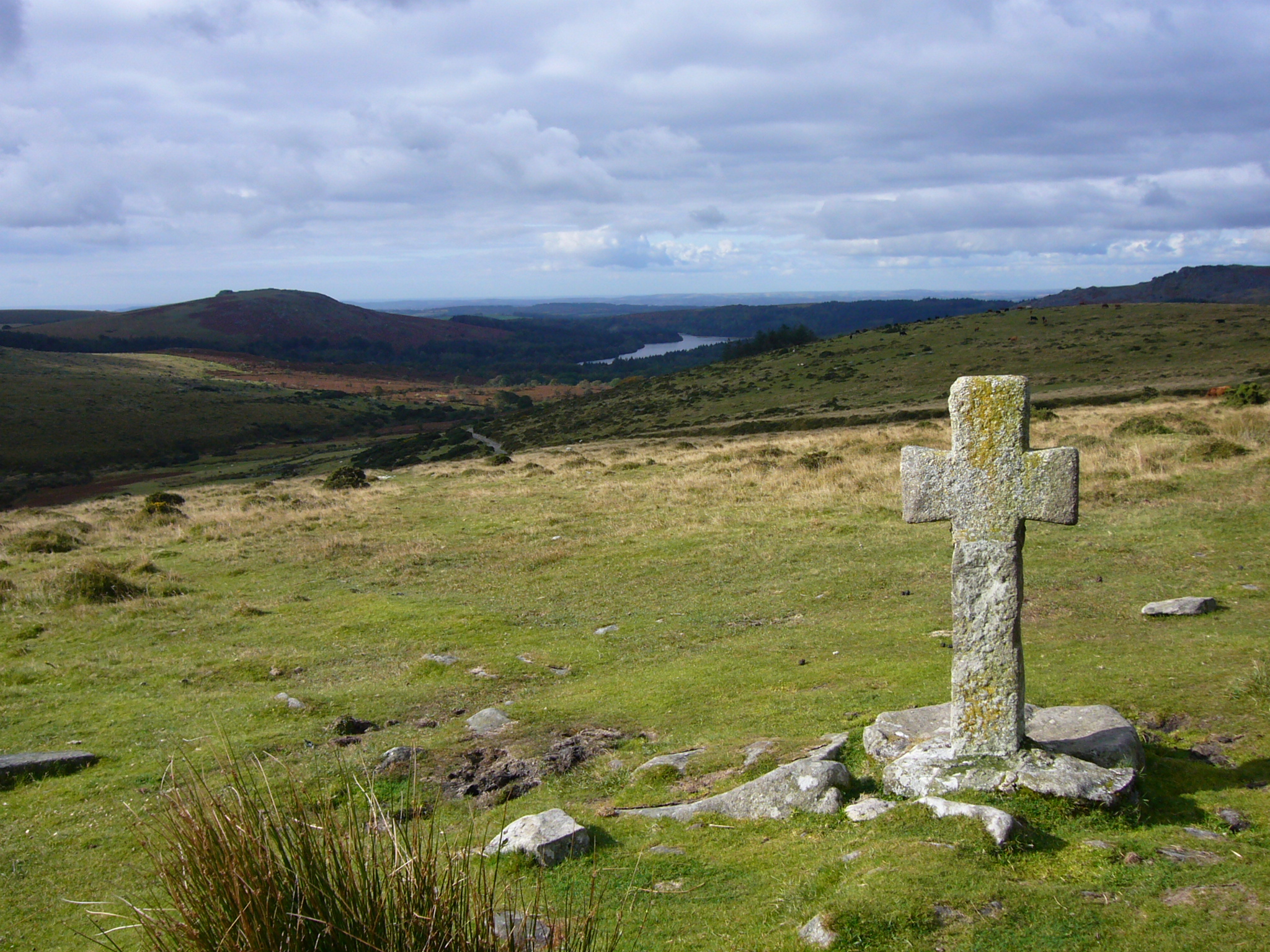
- Ancient cross close to Crazywell Pool on southern Dartmoor
- Interactive map of Dartmoor crosses
- 50°34′N 4°0′W
- Location: Devon, England, United Kingdom

The Dartmoor crosses are a series of stone crosses found in Dartmoor National Park in the centre of Devon, England. Many of them are old navigational aids, needed because of the remoteness of the moorland and its typically bad weather. Some mark medieval routes between abbeys. Other crosses were erected as memorials, for prayer, as town or market crosses, in churchyards, and as boundary markers. The crosses were erected over a long period of time, some as recently as 100 years ago, the earliest probably almost 1,000 years ago.

In 2005, the Dartmoor National Park Authority had an ongoing project to microchip the most vulnerable of its granite artifacts, including crosses, to deter theft and aid the recovery of any that might be stolen.

== Legend ==
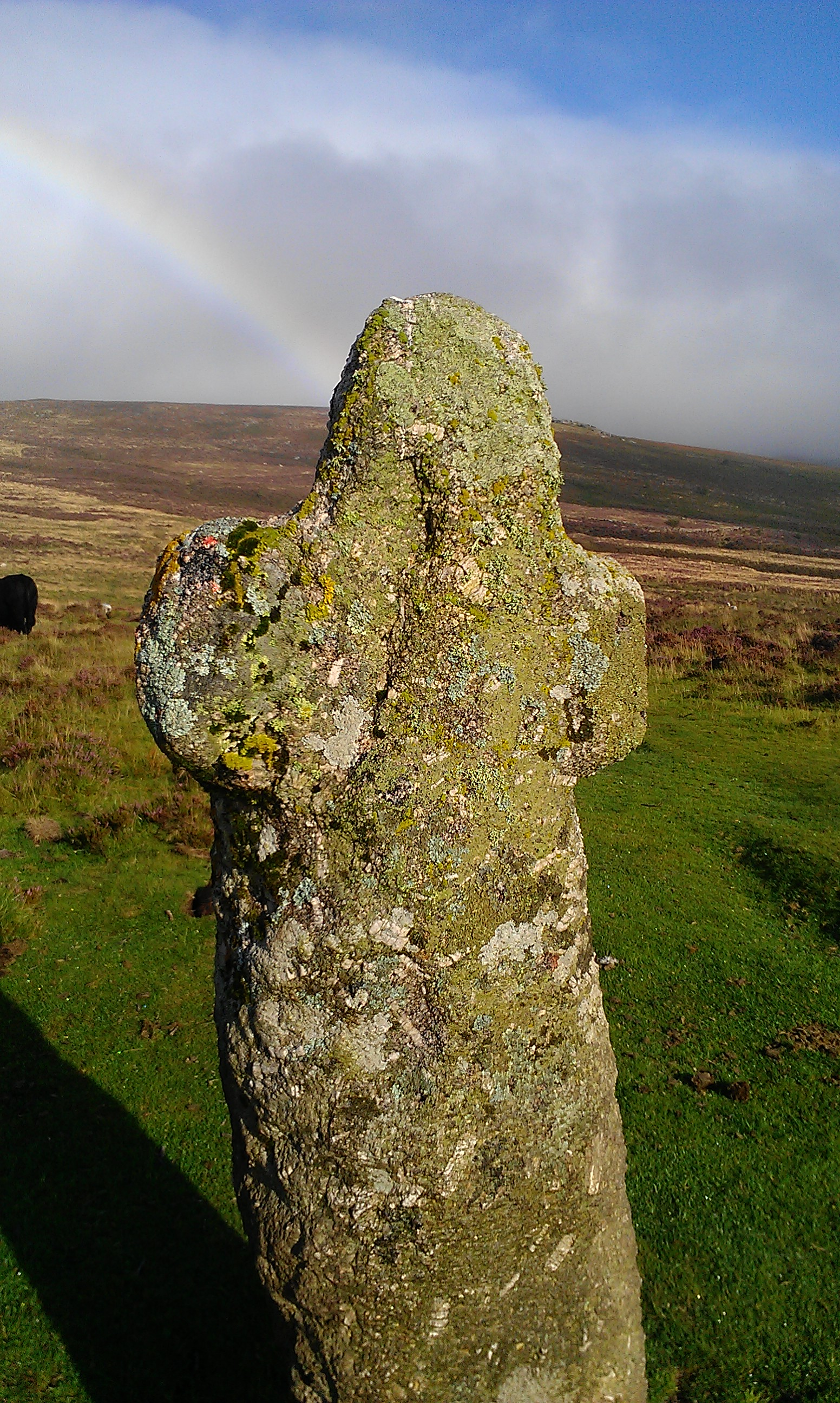
Detail of Bennett's Cross

There is a legend attached to the origin of the original crosses. The story says that there were four monks who did not want to follow their abbot's rules on austere living. Once the abbot went to Italy, the four brothers decided to celebrate, yet they needed some money. They robbed and killed a wealthy Jew. In the same evening the brothers were called to the nearby moor, which was covered in snow and ice at the time. When they reached the place, they realized that the messenger who had beckoned them was the ghost of the murdered Jewish man.

The ghost hypnotized them, and they wandered into the mire, fell through the ice, and were sucked into the thick bog. The abbot, who knew nothing about the murder of the old Jew and assumed they had run off out of guilt when they saw him coming home, ordered that the crosses be erected to mark the tracks from one monastery to another to prevent future monks from getting lost.

== Notable crosses ==
=== Bennett's Cross ===
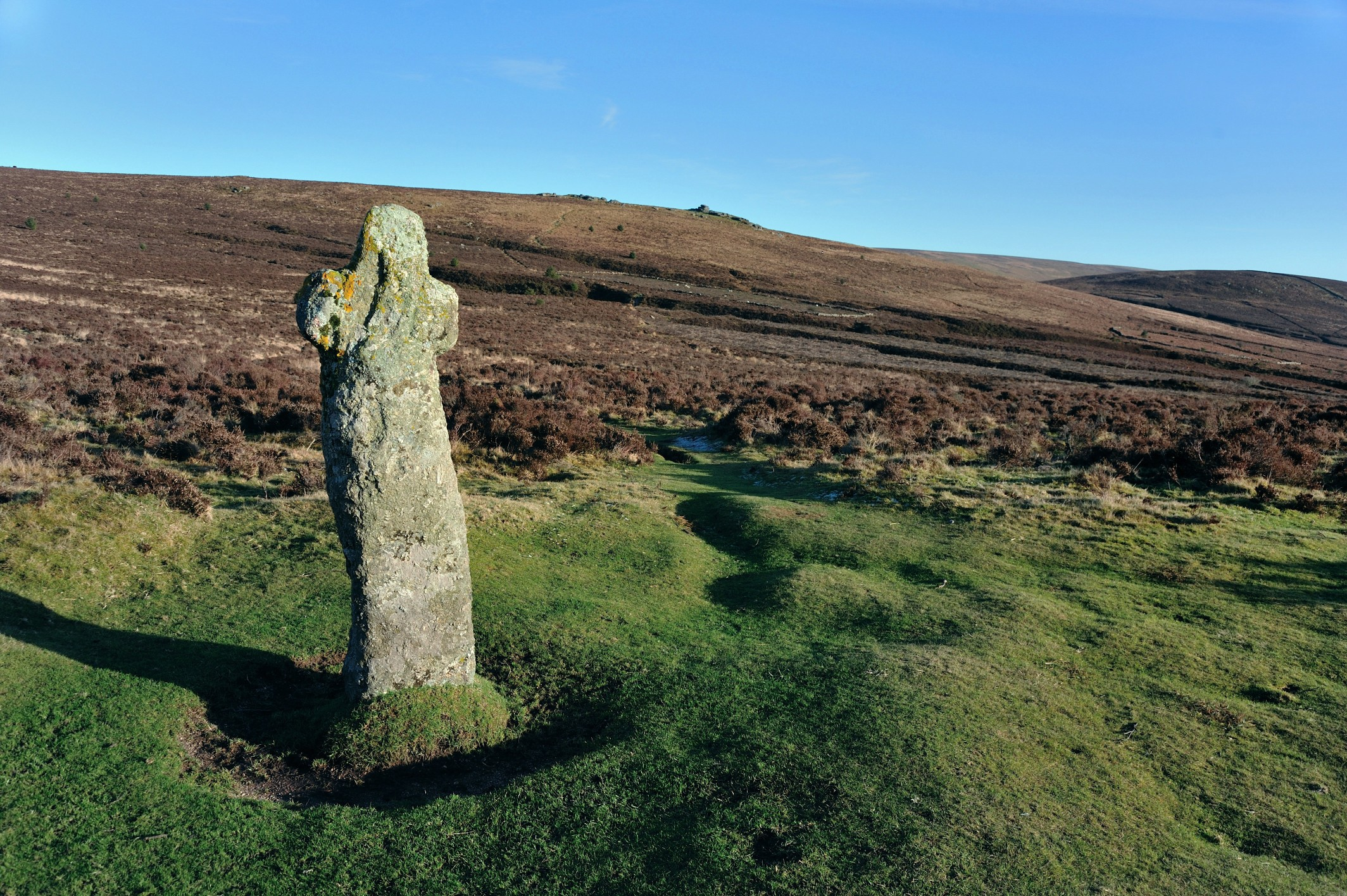
Bennett's Cross

This cross is by the side of the road from Moretonhampstead to Two Bridges, about 900 metres north-west of the Warren House Inn. It was probably erected at this spot for two reasons: as one of the markers of this route long before the road was built, and to mark the boundary between the parishes of Chagford and North Bovey, which runs roughly along the same line as the road. Nothing is known of the early history of the cross, although its crude shape suggests that it is very old. It was later used as a boundary marker for Headland Warren ("WB" carved on one face stands for "Warren Bounds") and as one of the bounds of the mining sett of Vitifer Mine. Its survival here is probably due to its use as a boundary marker: two similar crosses further along the road towards Two Bridges are known to have been removed in the 19th century.

Its original name is not known. In 1902, William Crossing, the well-known writer about Dartmoor, reported that it is mentioned in a document of 1702, where it is not named but referred to in such a way as to indicate that it was already well-known. It has been suggested that it may have been erected by the monks of a local Benedictine Order ("Bennet" was a common form of "Benedict") or that it was named after William Bennet, who was a miner who attended a Stannary Parliament on Crockern Tor in the early 16th century. However, it seems that the actual reason for its present-day name is that it was discovered in a fallen state and subsequently restored and re-erected on its present spot by Ellery Bennet, a Plymouth solicitor, in the 1860s.

=== Cadover Cross ===
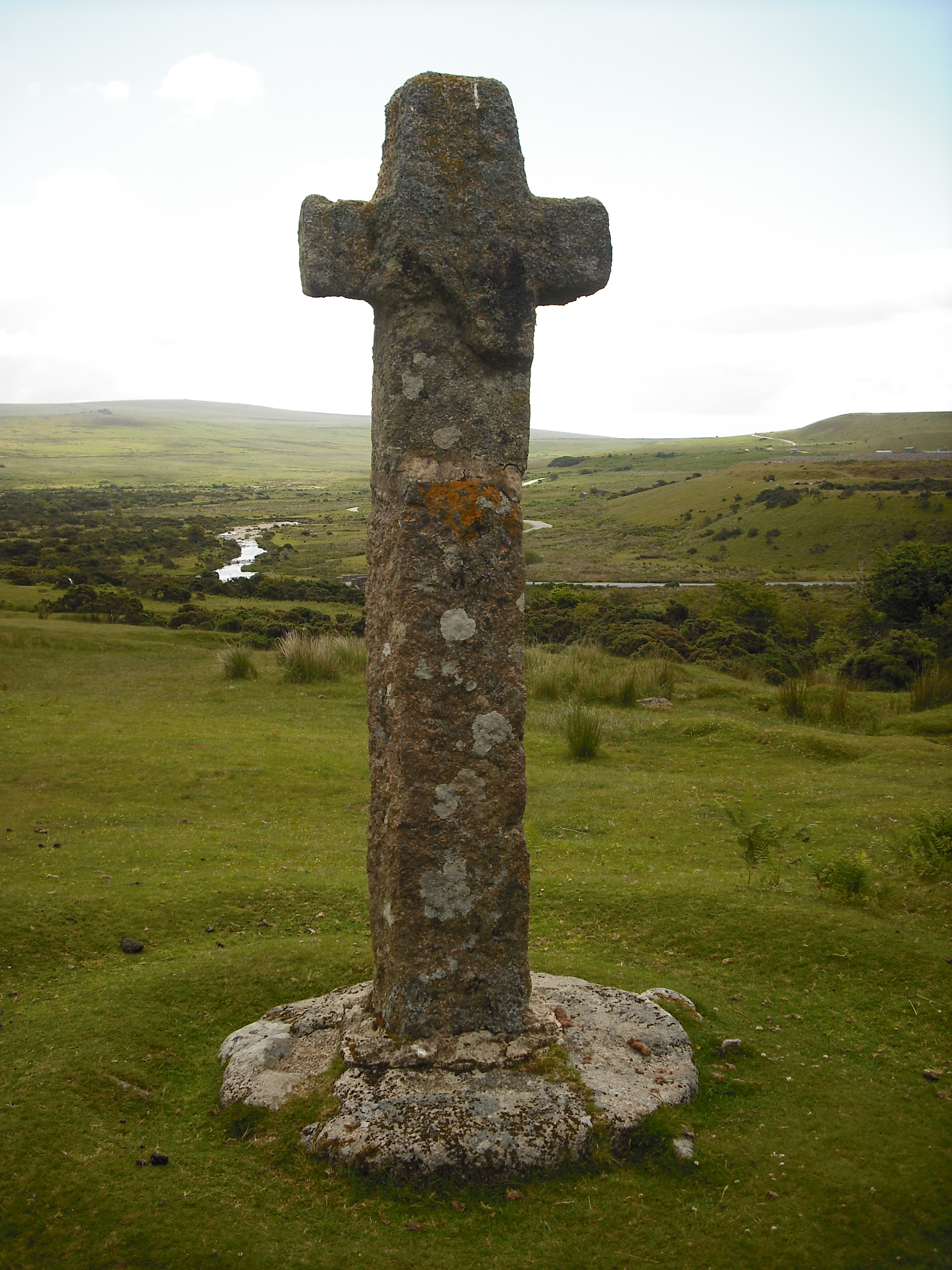
Cadover Cross

Cadover Cross is located on Wigford Down, about 250 metres north-west of Cadover Bridge on the minor road between Plympton and Yelverton. Two important 12th century routes used the river crossing here: one leading from Tavistock to Plympton Priory, the other to Ivybridge via Cornwood, so it is likely that the cross existed then. The first documentary evidence for it is a mention as a boundary mark in 1381.

The head of the cross was discovered by soldiers in 1873 and at the request of the vicar of the nearby village of Shaugh Prior they erected it on the spot where it was found. By 1901 it had fallen again and it remained so until 1915 when Hugh Breton, the vicar of Sheepstor, arranged for it to be re-erected on a new shaft. After searching for a suitable site to re-erect it, they dug a hole and fortuitously discovered the original socket-stone which they raised to ground level and re-used.

Early 20th century writers described incised crosses on the faces of the cross, but they are barely visible today.

=== Crazywell Cross ===
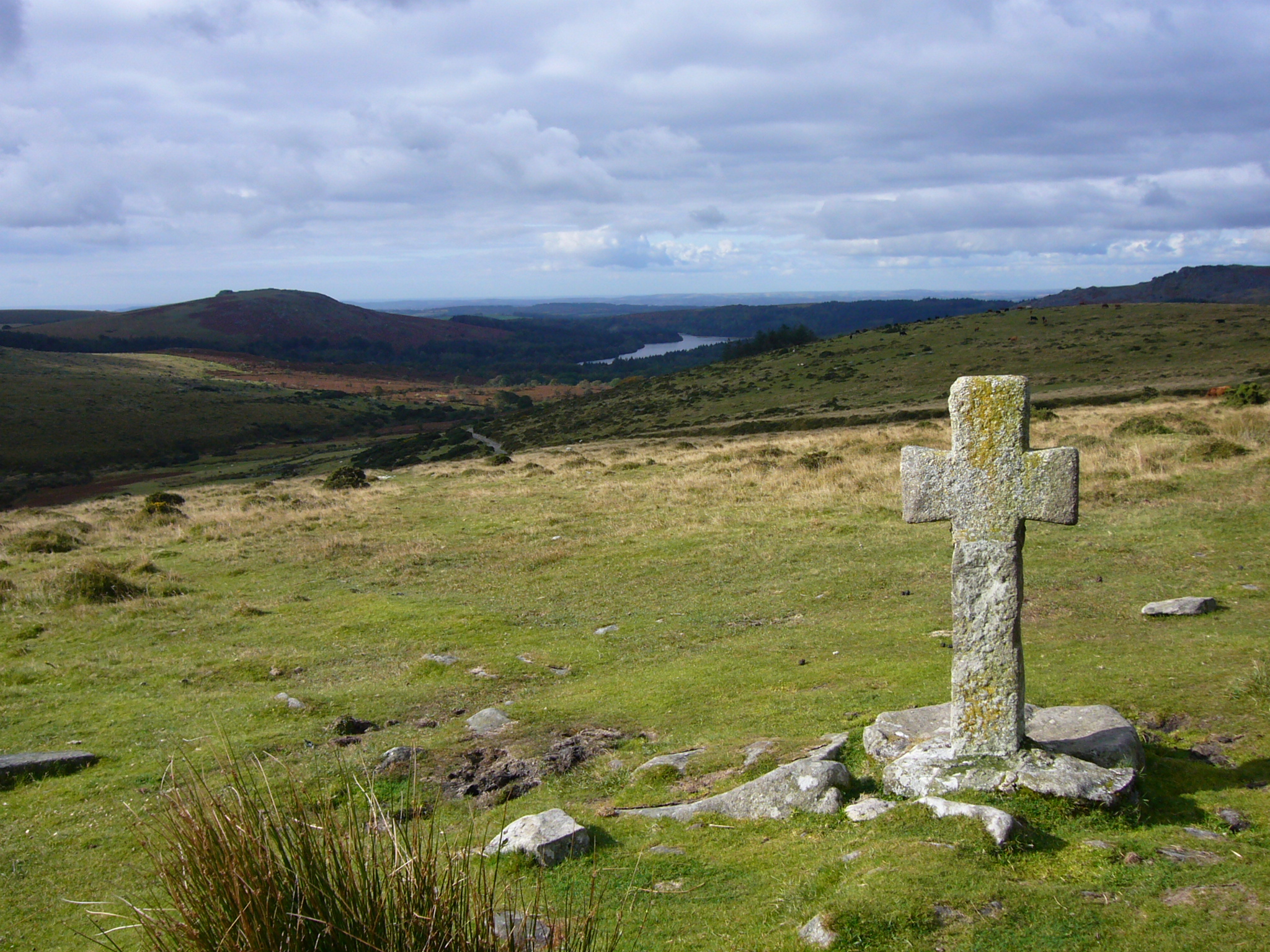
Crazywell Cross

Crazywell Cross is an ancient cross close to Crazywell Pool in southern Dartmoor. Like the cross pattée, the arms of the cross grow wider as they move away from the centre. It probably was used as a marker for the track (Monks' Path) from Buckfast Abbey to Tavistock Abbey. The head of the cross was found close to the north-east side of the pool by William Crossing. He believed that its original site was nearer to the track and it was fitted with a new shaft and set up there. In 1952 it was reported to the Dartmoor Preservation Association that the cross had been damaged again and it was repaired and the base made more secure.

Many legends and superstitions surround the nearby area. It was said Crazywell Pool was bottomless and that waters of the pool were able to predict the next monk to die. There was also said to be a witch, who haunted the place and gave people bad advice. Legend says she advised Piers Gaveston, a possible lover of Edward II, to return to king's court after being banished to Ireland telling him that "his humbled head shall soon be high". Instead, he was captured by the king's enemies and beheaded and his head was set up on high battlements.

=== Goldsmith's Cross ===
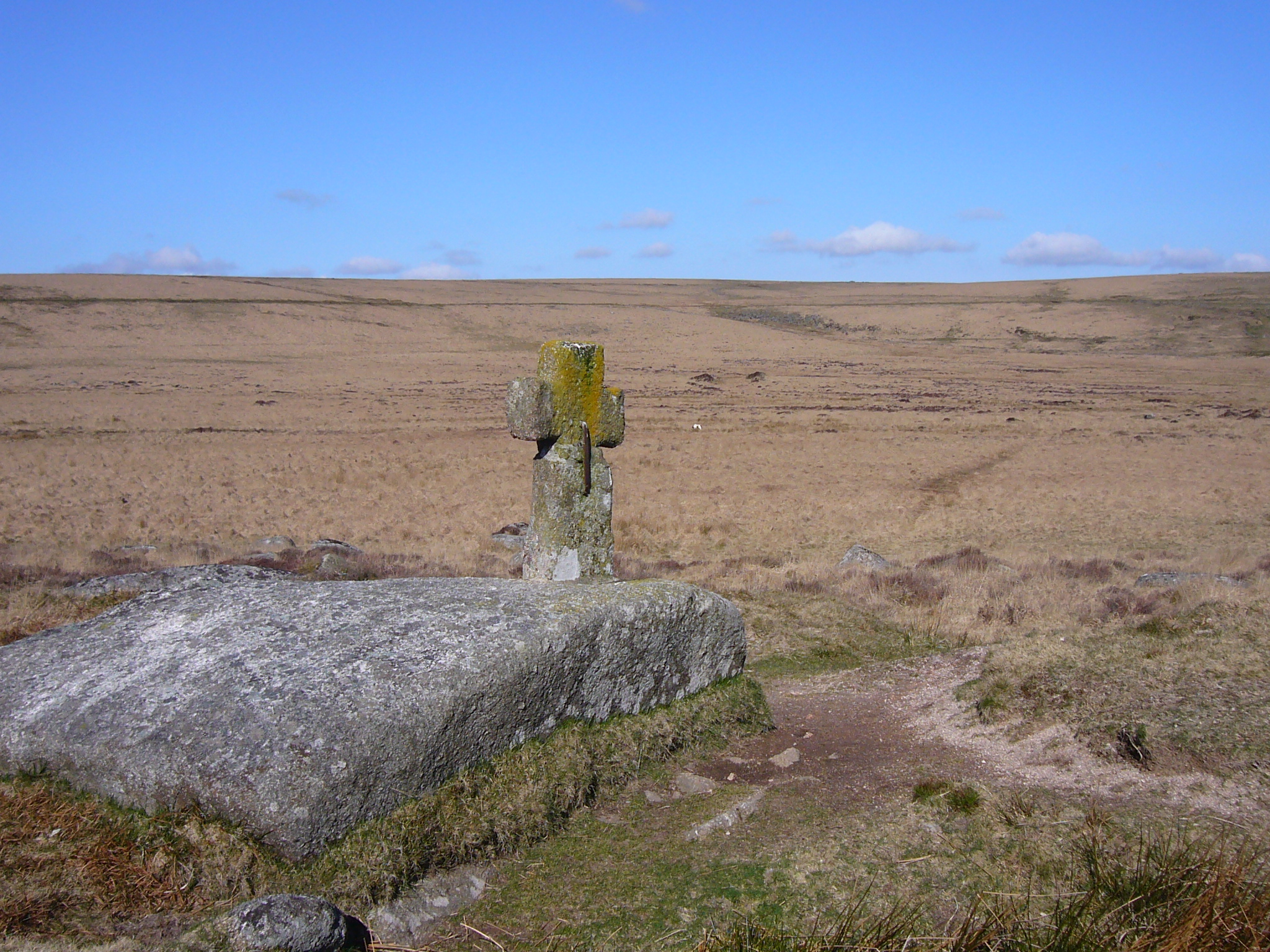
Goldsmith's cross

Goldsmith's cross is located in the Fox Tor Mire area between Childe's Tomb and Nun's Cross, on the Monks' Path. It was named for Lieutenant M. Lennon Goldsmith who discovered the socket, head and lower part of the shaft in 1903, making it the last major discovery of a cross on the moor. He reported his find to William Crossing whose detailed book on the crosses of Dartmoor had just been published. Crossing was unwilling to believe in its existence, so Goldsmith re-erected it with the help of four sailors from his ship. He passed the details to Crossing who conceded and included it in the 1910 edition of his Guide to Dartmoor. The cross is short and stumpy because the upper part of the shaft was never found.

=== Horn's Cross ===
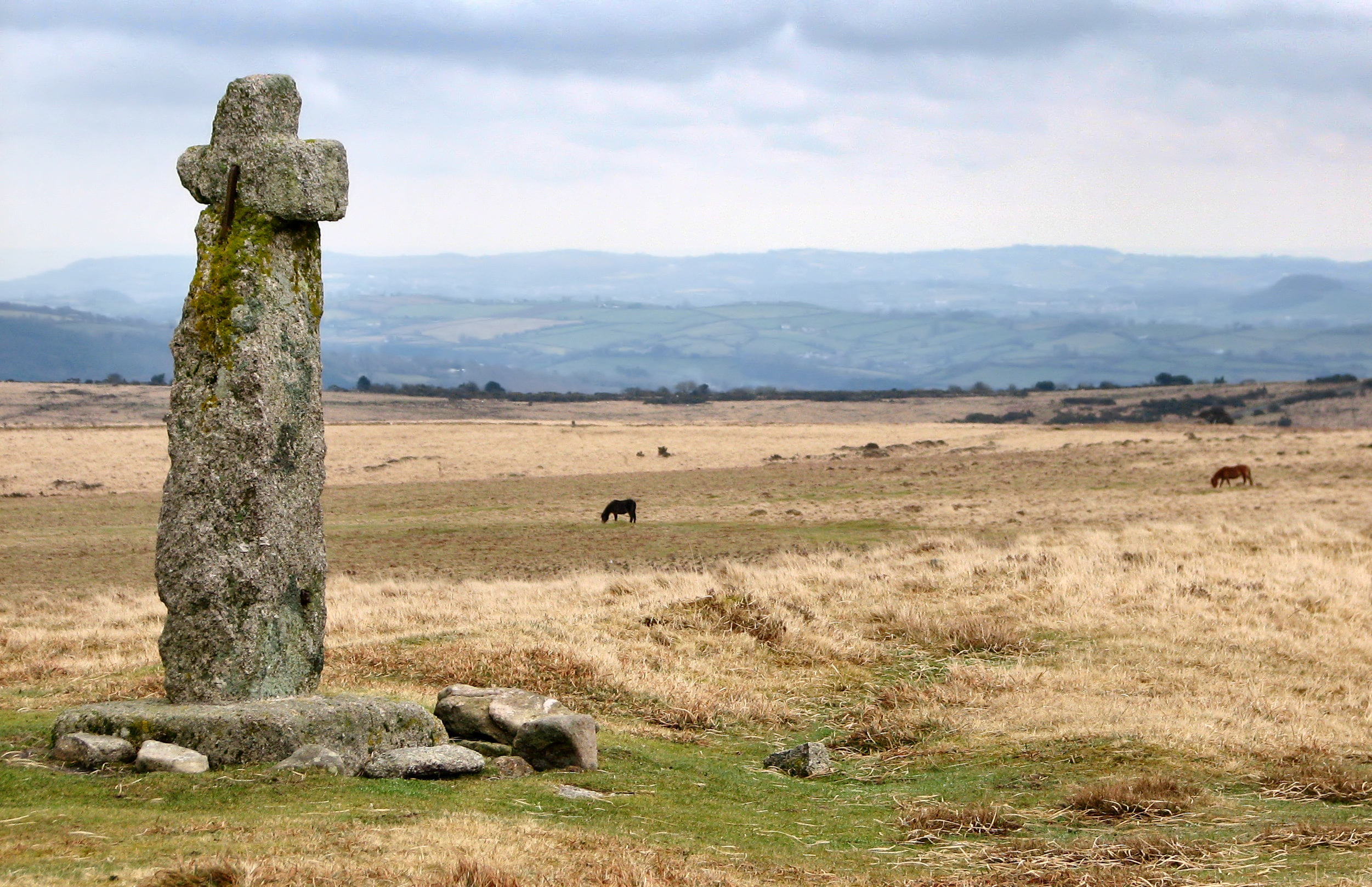
Horn's Cross

Horn's Cross is located on the lower part of Holne Ridge, east of the O Brook and 0.5 miles (0.80 km) south of Combestone Tor. It lies at the junction of the Monks' Path and a track used by moorland farmers that went from Hexworthy to South Brent. It is now the first moorland cross on the eastern end of the Monks' Path, though it is thought that another one used to exist nearer to the edge of the moor.

In 1887, William Crossing wrote that the cross was badly damaged, with only the socket-stone and the head remaining. The head included a small part of the shaft and had only one arm complete. The cross has since been restored with a new shaft, though one of the arms remains mutilated and the iron tie-pieces holding the head to the shaft can be clearly seen.

Near to the cross, along the crest of the ridge, are a series of low Bronze Age burial cairns and the remains of associated stone rows. The cairn closest to the cross (60 metres to the west) was excavated by Robert Burnard in 1905. According to him its central pit contained "a considerable quantity of charcoal and burnt bones, but no other relics".

=== Mount Misery Cross ===
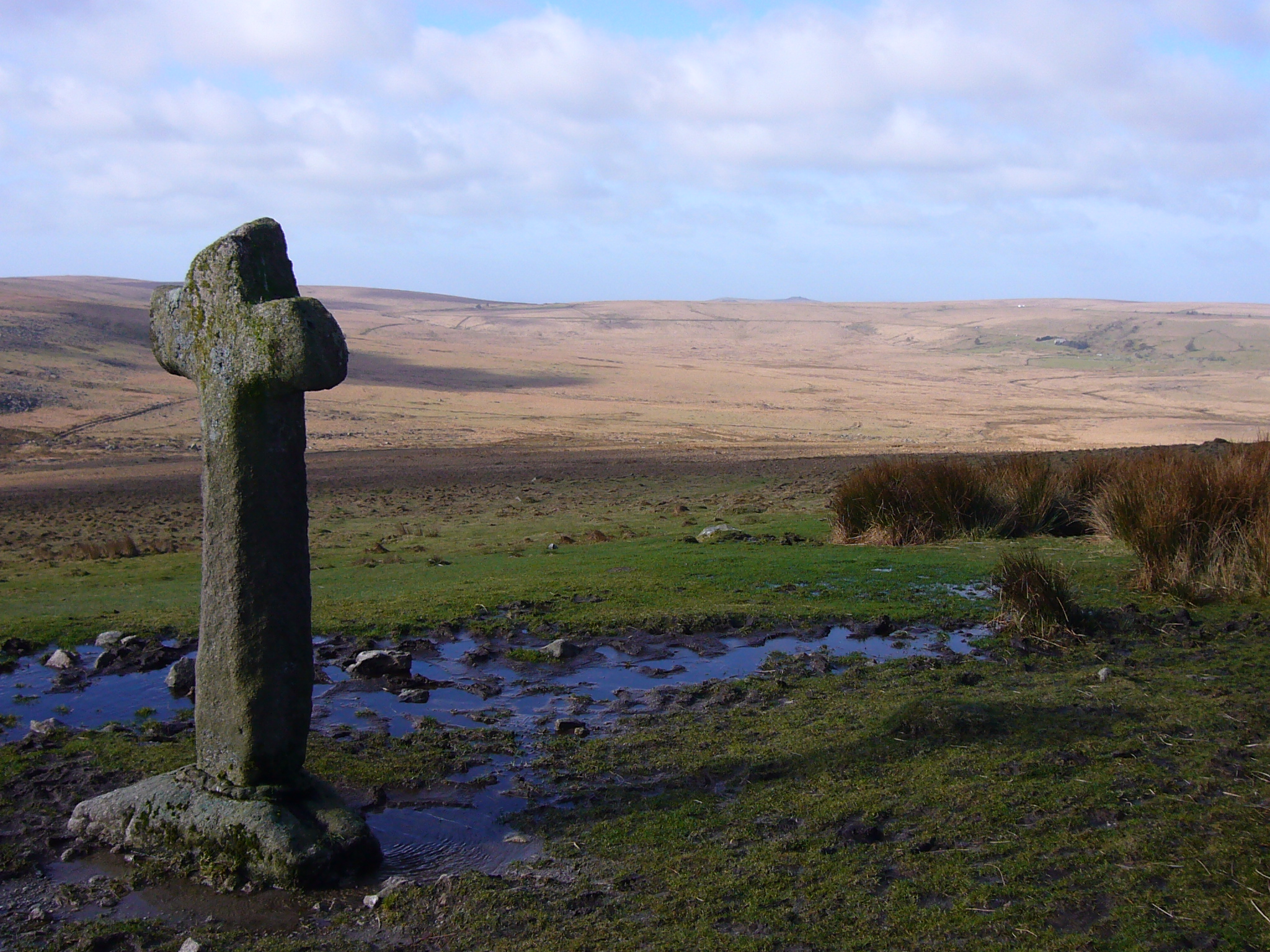
Mount Misery cross

Like Crazywell Cross, it was used to mark the Monks' Path between Buckfast Abbey and Tavistock Abbey. The name "Misery" was given to this place because of the harsh weather of this exposed corner of Fox Tor Newtake. When William Crossing first encountered this cross it was lying on the ground. In 1879 it was standing, but was down again in 1881. Crossing assisted in its re-erection in 1885, and it remains standing today.

The infamous Fox Tor mire in the vicinity of the cross became an inspiration for the Grimpen Mire, which Sir Arthur Conan Doyle described in his The Hound of the Baskervilles.

=== Nun's or Siward's Cross ===
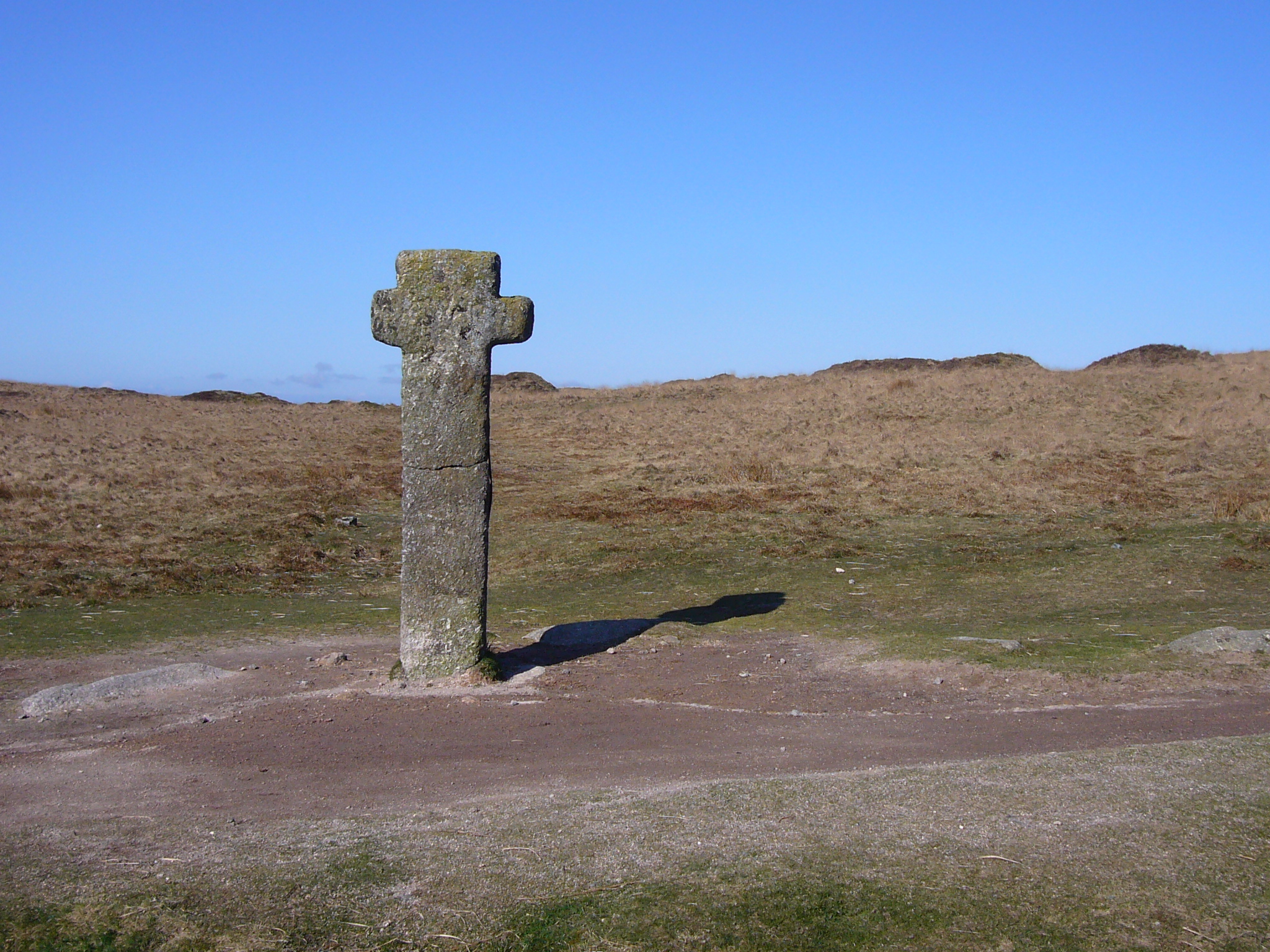
Siward's cross

This is the largest and oldest recorded cross on Dartmoor, being mentioned in the 1240 Perambulation of the Forest of Dartmoor. It was historically known as Siward's Cross, most likely in connection with Siward, Earl of Northumbria at the time of Edward the Confessor. Siward was Lord of the Manor of Tavei (probably today's Mary Tavy) and witnessed the founding charter of Exeter Cathedral in 1050. The derivation of its alternative name of Nun's Cross, which was first recorded as "Nannecross" in 1699, is unknown, but William Crossing suggested that it may be derived from the Cornu-Celtic "nans" or "nant" meaning valley or ravine.

The cross was probably erected during Edward the Confessor's reign (1042–1066), and stands at the junction of two main tracks across the moor: The Monks’ Path and the Abbots’ Way, both of which link Buckfast Abbey to Tavistock Abbey and Buckland Abbey. It was knocked down in 1846 and the shaft broken. It was restored in 1848 at the instigation of Sir Ralph Lopes.

Both faces of the cross bear badly weathered inscriptions which have been the source of much speculation since the 19th century. One currently favoured theory is that the western face reads BOC LAND, marking the limit of the land owned by Buckland Abbey, though on a 16th-century map depicting the 1240 Perambulation it is recorded as ROOLANDE. This face also has a cross carved on it above the lettering. The eastern face may read SIWARD or SYWARD.

=== Spurrell's Cross ===
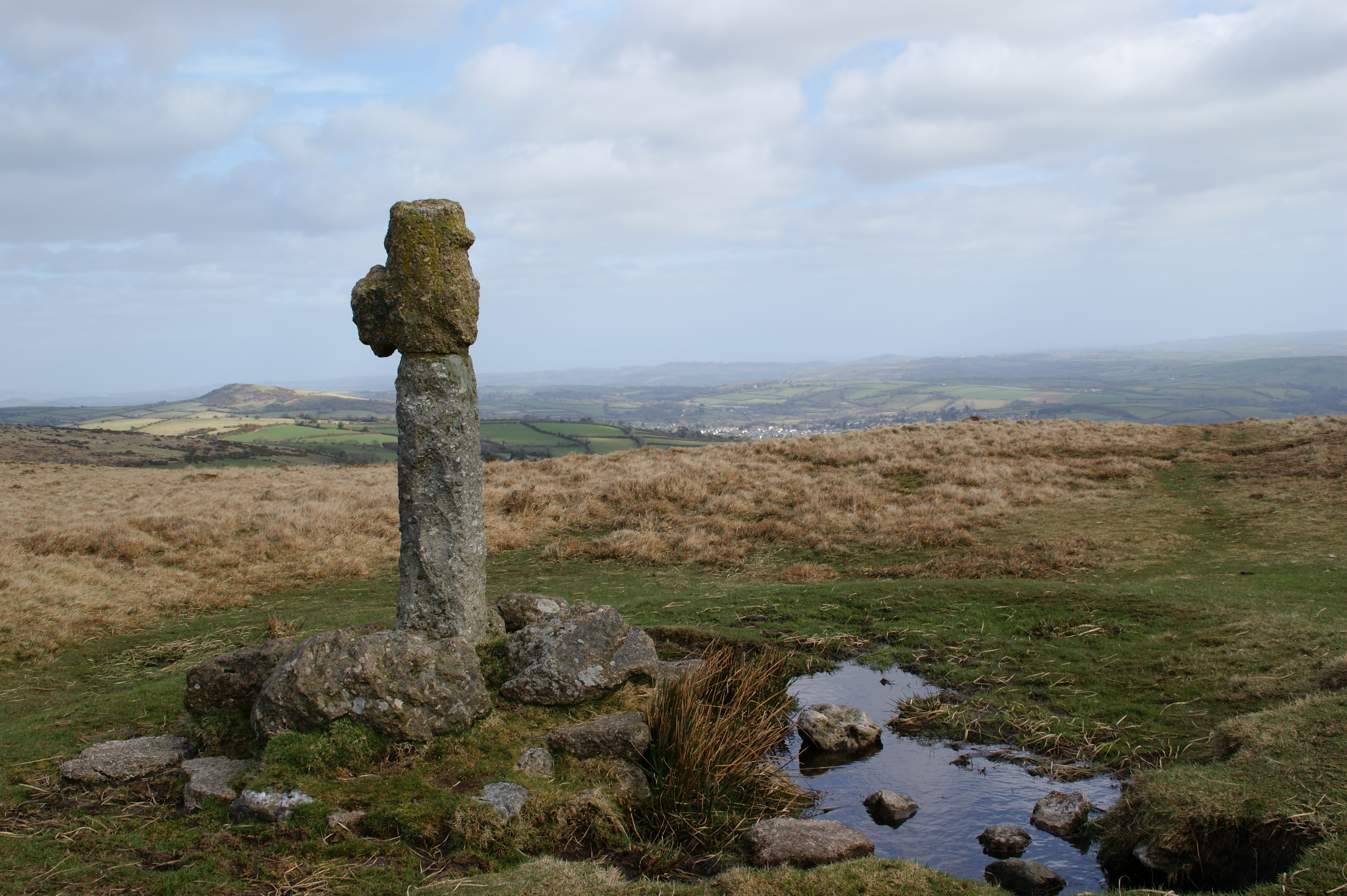
Spurrell's Cross

Located on Ugborough Moor, three miles north-east of Ivybridge, this cross is at the crossroads of an ancient east–west track between Exeter and Plymouth, and the north-south Blackwood path that was once used by peat cutters.

The cross is unique on Dartmoor for having spurred limbs of a type that were popular in the 14th century. It is badly damaged, only the head (missing one arm) being original. A well-preserved cross of the same design, but made of sandstone, is in the porch of the village church in Ermington, about four miles to the south. Spurrell's Cross was restored with a new shaft by the Dartmoor Preservation Association in 1931, but was later knocked down. It was re-erected by the same organisation in 1954.

=== Ter Hill crosses ===
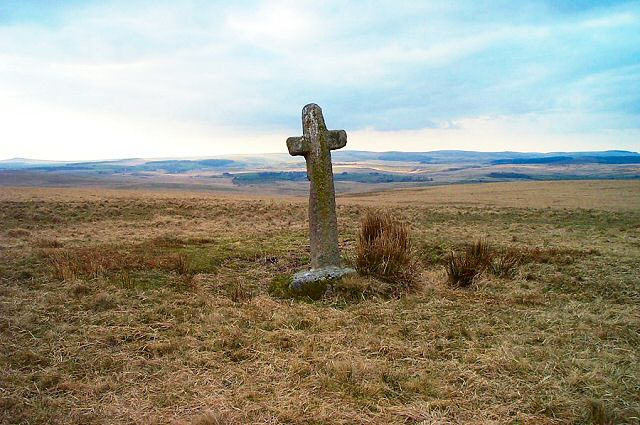
Ter Hill – the northeast cross

There were two crosses on Ter Hill — a southwest one and a northeast one. The southwest cross was badly damaged and found too fragile to stand at its original location. It was moved to the Jack Wigmore Memorial Garden (High Moorland Centre, Princetown). A replica of the southwest cross was erected on Ter Hill in 1994. The northeast cross was removed from its original place in the 17th century by a Mr. Coaker of Sherberton, who used it in his courtyard. Eventually the cross was returned to its original place and re-erected in 1885.

== Other crosses ==
There are 132 known crosses within the National Park boundary, according to Harrison. This is a list of a few of them.

- Childe's Tomb
- Fingle Bridge Cross
- Harton Cross
- Hexworthy Cross
- Hobajohn's Cross
- Huntingdon Cross
- Maggie Cross
- Petre's Cross
- Southcott Cross
- Sampford Spiney Cross
- Shaugh Prior crosses
- Sherwell Cross
- Week Down Cross
- Widecombe crosses
- Widgery Cross

== Lost crosses ==
A deed of Amicia, Countess of Devon dated 1280, in which she gifts lands to Buckland Abbey, mentions Siward's Cross (listed above) and five others, now lost: Copriscrosse, Wolewille, Maynstoncross, Smalacumbacrosse and Yanedonecross.

== See also ==
- High cross
- Calvary cross
- Ridgeway (track)

== Sources ==
- Crossing, William (1902). The Ancient Stone Crosses of Dartmoor and its Borderland. Exeter: James G. Commin.
- Crossing, William (1912). Guide to Dartmoor (Second ed.). Plymouth: The Western Morning News Co. Ltd.
- Harrison, Bill (2001). Dartmoor Stone Crosses. Tiverton: Devon Books / Halsgrove. ISBN 1-85522-791-6.
- E. Masson Phillips (1937). "The Ancient Stone Crosses of Devon: Part 1". Report & Transactions of the Devonshire Association. 69: 289–342.
