= Wooston Castle =

Iron Age hill fort in Devon, England

Coordinates: 50.6936°N 3.7500°W

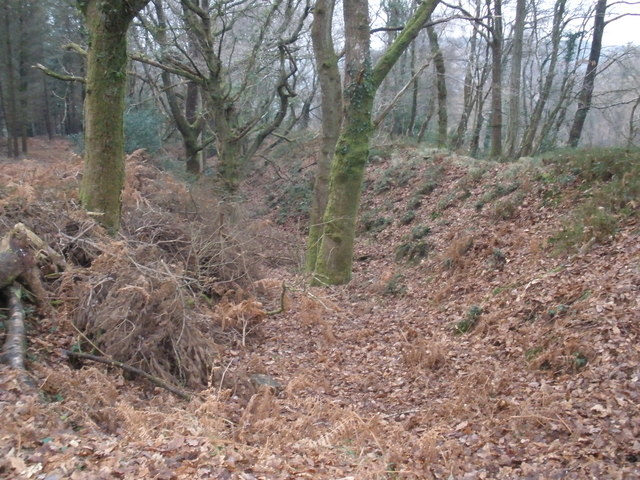
Defensive ditch inside Wooston Castle

Wooston Castle is an Iron Age Hill fort situated on the edge of a hill overlooking the Teign Valley in Devon some 200 metres (660 ft) above sea level, only 3 kilometres (1.9 mi) south and east of Prestonbury Castle and 5 kilometres (3.1 mi) east of Cranbrook Castle.
