= Sheepstor =

Village in Devon, England

Coordinates: 50.490847°N 4.032040°W

Village of Sheepstor
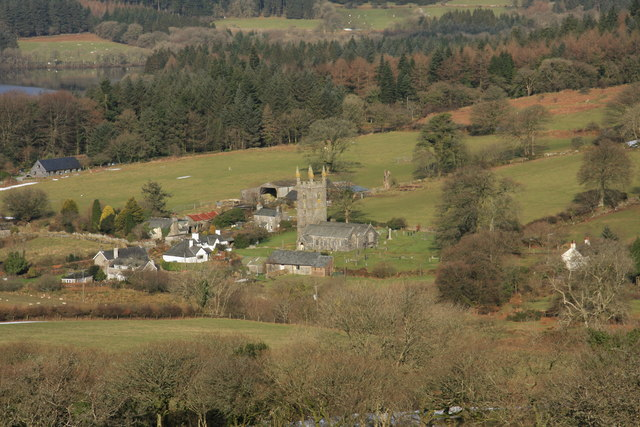
- View of Sheepstor village

- Location within Devon
- Population: 53 (Census 2001)
- OS grid reference: SX560676
  - London: 184 miles (296 km)
- District: West Devon
- Shire county: Devon
- Region: South West
- Country: England
- Sovereign state: United Kingdom
- Post town: YELVERTON
- Postcode district: PL20
- Dialling code: 01822
- Police: Devon and Cornwall
- Fire: Devon and Somerset
- Ambulance: South Western
- UK Parliament: South West Devon
- Website: Sheepstor community page

Sheepstor is a village, civil parish and former manor on the western side of Dartmoor in the county of Devon, England. In 2001, its population was 53, down from 95 in 1901. For administrative purposes the parish is grouped with the parishes of Meavy and Walkhampton to form Burrator Parish Council, and for electoral purposes it is grouped with the same two parishes to form Burrator Ward. Burrator Reservoir, constructed in 1898, is to the north of the village and forms part of the northern boundary of the parish.

The name Sheepstor has evolved considerably since the first reference to a settlement here which was recorded in a pipe roll of 1168 as Sitelestorra. In a document of 1262, it was Skytelestor, Shittestorre in 1474, Shistor in 1547 and in c. 1620 Tristram Risdon called it Shetelstor now Shepstor. The name probably derives from the Old English scyttel(s) meaning a bar or bolt, reflecting the shape of the nearby Sheeps Tor.

== Manor ==
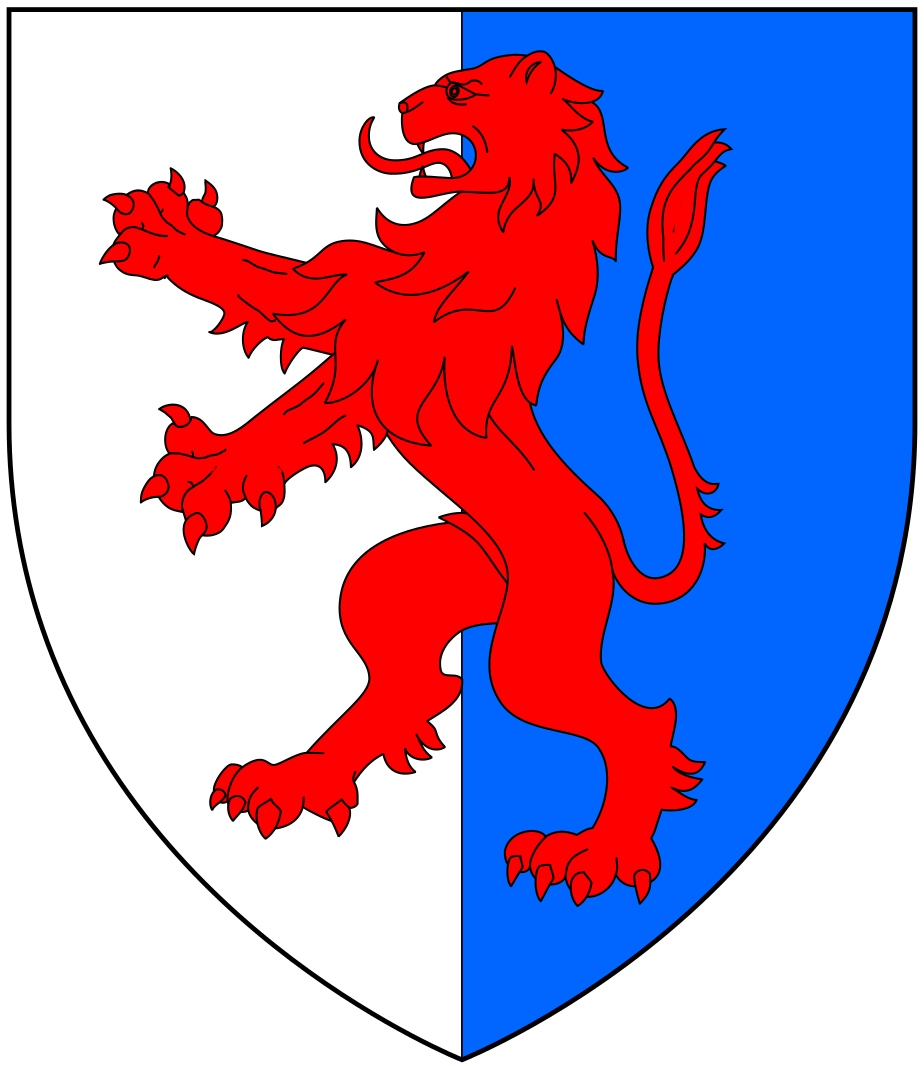
Arms of Elford of Sheepstor: Per pale argent and azure, a lion rampant gules

The manor of Sheepstor was held by the Scudamore family, whose heirs were the Elford family.

== Sheepstor Church ==
The village church, dedicated to St Leonard, is built of granite and dates from the 15th century, though a chapelry was first documented here in 1240. The church contains a fine rood screen which was reconstructed in 1914 by the then vicar Hugh Breton from drawings made of the original that had been removed in a 19th-century restoration. Buried in the churchyard are James Brooke, Charles Brooke and Charles Vyner Brooke, the three White Rajahs of the Sarawak kingdom, in modern-day Sarawak (now part of Malaysia), as well as Bertram Willes Dayrell Brooke, another member of the Brooke family. The graves of the Rajahs have been designated Grade II listed monuments by English Heritage.

There are currently six bells in the church tower, five of which were cast in 1769, with a sixth hung in 1904; one of the older bells has inscribed on it the words 'I call the quick to church and the dead to grave'. A local legend tells that the bell ropes of the church were once tied together and lowered into Crazywell Pool, 3.6 km to the north east of Sheepstor, in order to determine the depth. According to the legend the ropes descended as much as 90 fathoms without reaching the bottom, causing people to believe the pool is bottomless.

The church has been renovated several times, the most thorough of which was in 1861 at a cost of £590.

== Sheeps Tor ==
Sheeps Tor, from which the village is named, is a prominent outcrop about half a mile north east of the village. The summit is 369m above sea level and it is one of the area's most prominent tors.

== Sheepstor in popular culture ==
In 2010 Sheepstor was one of the filming locations for the Steven Spielberg film War Horse, and the village with its prominent church tower features in an aerial shot in the trailer for the film which was released on 29 June 2011.

== See also ==
Nearby archaeological sites:

- Yellowmead stone circle
- Drizzlecombe
- Eylesbarrow mine
- Cadover Cross
