= Holne Chase Castle =

Iron Age hill fort in Devon, England

Coordinates: 50°31′59″N 3°48′04″W

Interactive map of Holne Chase Castle

Holne Chase Castle is an Iron Age hill fort situated close to Buckland-in-the-Moor in Devon, England. The fort is situated on a promontory on the northern slopes of Holne Chase in Chase Wood at approx 150 metres (490 ft) above sea level overlooking the River Dart.
