= Prestonbury Castle =

Iron Age hill fort in Devon, England

Coordinates: 50.6962°N 3.7758°W

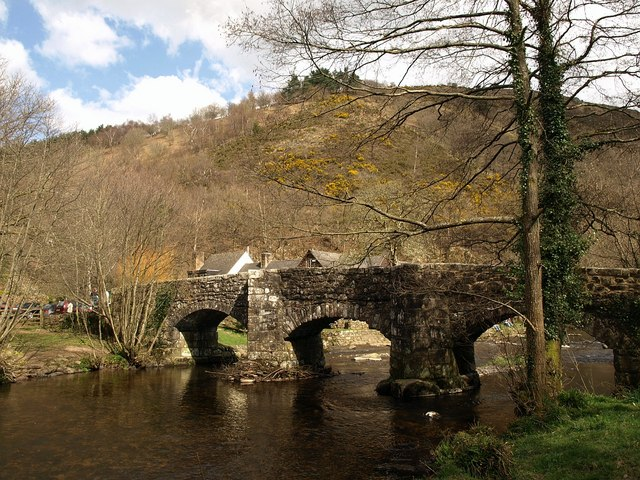
Fingle Bridge with the hill of Prestonbury Castle in the background

Prestonbury Castle is an Iron Age Hill fort on the north east edge of Dartmoor in Devon, England. Situated on a massive hilltop some 240 metres (790 ft) above sea level overlooking the Teign Valley, it is located near two other hill forts (Cranbrook Castle and Wooston Castle) both of which lie about 2 km (1 mi) away.
