= Walkhampton =

Village in Devon, England

Coordinates: 50.508°N 4.070°W

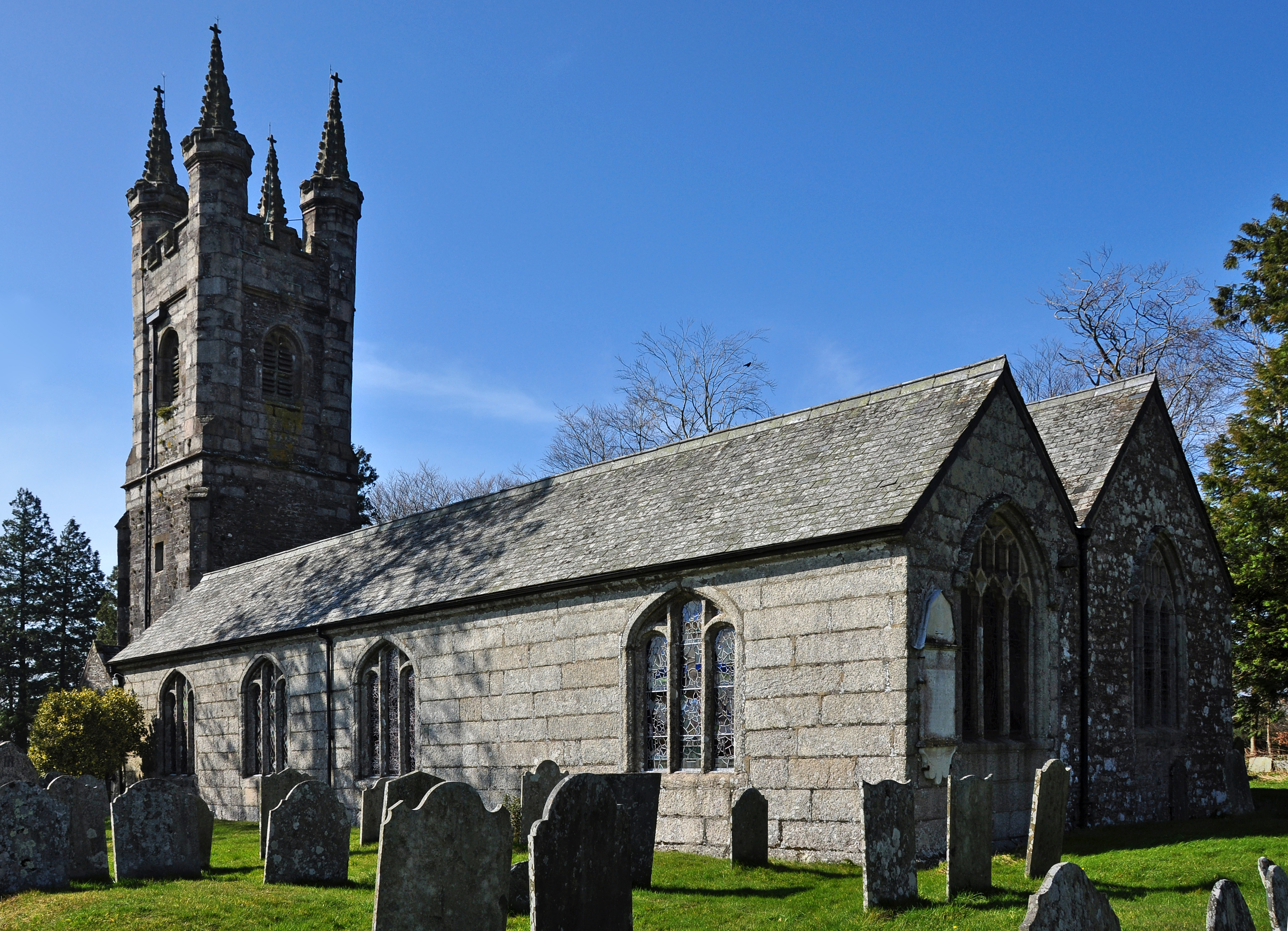
- Walkhampton church

- Location within Devon
- Population: 863 (Census 2001)
- OS grid reference: SX533696
- District: West Devon
- Shire county: Devon
- Region: South West
- Country: England
- Sovereign state: United Kingdom
- Post town: Yelverton
- Postcode district: PL20
- Police: Devon and Cornwall
- Fire: Devon and Somerset
- Ambulance: South Western
- UK Parliament: South West Devon
- Website: Burrator Parish Council

Walkhampton is a village and civil parish on the western side of Dartmoor in the county of Devon, England. The village lies on the Black Brook, a tributary of the River Walkham, about 7 kilometres (4.3 mi) south-east of Tavistock, near the villages of Horrabridge, Yelverton and Dousland. Burrator Reservoir, constructed in 1898, is to the south-east.

In 2001 the population of the parish was 863. For administrative purposes the parish is grouped with the parishes of Meavy and Sheepstor to form Burrator Parish Council, and for electoral purposes it is grouped with the same two parishes to form Burrator Ward.

The village has a pub, the Walkhampton Inn, dating from the 17th century, and a primary school named Lady Modiford's School which was founded in 1719, though the present building with its distinctive bell and clock tower dates from the second half of the 19th century. In 2004 the school had 119 pupils in four classes.

Walkhampton church, which is Grade I listed, is on an ancient elevated site about half a mile north-west of the village. Unlike most churches which face east, it faces north-east, the direction of the rising sun on the longest day. The present building, which is built of granite and has a tower with four prominent pinnacles, dates from the 15th century, with much later alteration, including restoration in 1860–61. For 400 years until 1985 the church had no dedication and was known simply as "Walkhampton Church", but in that year it was dedicated to St Mary the Virgin. Research has indicated that it may have been originally dedicated to St Dionisius of Walkynton.

Church House, bearing the date 1698, but substantially 16th century in construction, is near the church. It was once an inn. Also nearby is an ancient stone cross which was reconstructed from parts found in a hedge. The base and shaft were re-erected in 1984 by relatives of the Lieutenant Goldsmith who in 1903 had discovered a cross on the moor; a head was added in 1991.

On the moorland above the village is Walkhampton Common which contains many important archaeological sites including at least eight stone rows, many cairns, cists, hut circles and reaves dating to the Bronze Age. There is also much evidence of tin mining from medieval times and later.
