= Scorriton =

Village in Devon, United Kingdom

Coordinates: 50.502°N 3.829°W

Scoriton is a tiny village in the county of Devon, England, and the main centre of habitation of the parish of West Buckfastleigh.

== Description ==
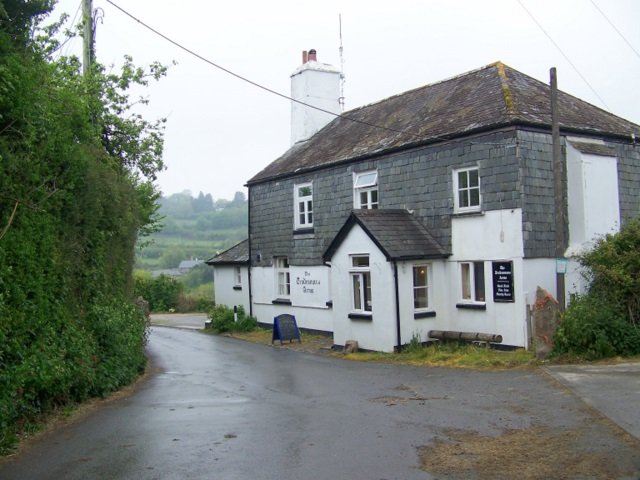
The Tradesman's Arms.

The village is about three miles northwest of Buckfastleigh and is situated within the boundaries of Dartmoor National Park.

The village consists largely of about a dozen stone-built cottages, but there are also 4 local authority houses, and a farm in the centre of the village, also a popular inn with food and accommodation, called The Tradesman's Arms. Faced with the closure of the inn in 2008, four regulars decided to buy the property and reopen it. The inn is still open and thriving as of August 2026.

The Scoriton Country Show is held annually on August Bank Holiday Monday in a field on the outskirts of the village near the Stumpy oak, it is now in its 77th year. There is also an annual Christmas black-tie 'Ball in the Hall' which is held at the Scoriton Village Hall.

== Transportation ==
Bus line 672 of Country Bus Devon calls at The Tradesman's Arms every Thursday (except for public holidays): once at 10:11 towards Buckfastleigh, Ashburton, Seale, and Newton Abbot, and once at 14:15 towards Holne, Poundsgate, Ponsworthy, Widecombe, and Buckland-in-the-Moor.

== Twinning ==
The village is twinned with the commune of Fontaine-Henry, Calvados, France.
