= Burrator =

Grouped parish council in Dartmoor

Coordinates: 50°29′N 4°02′W

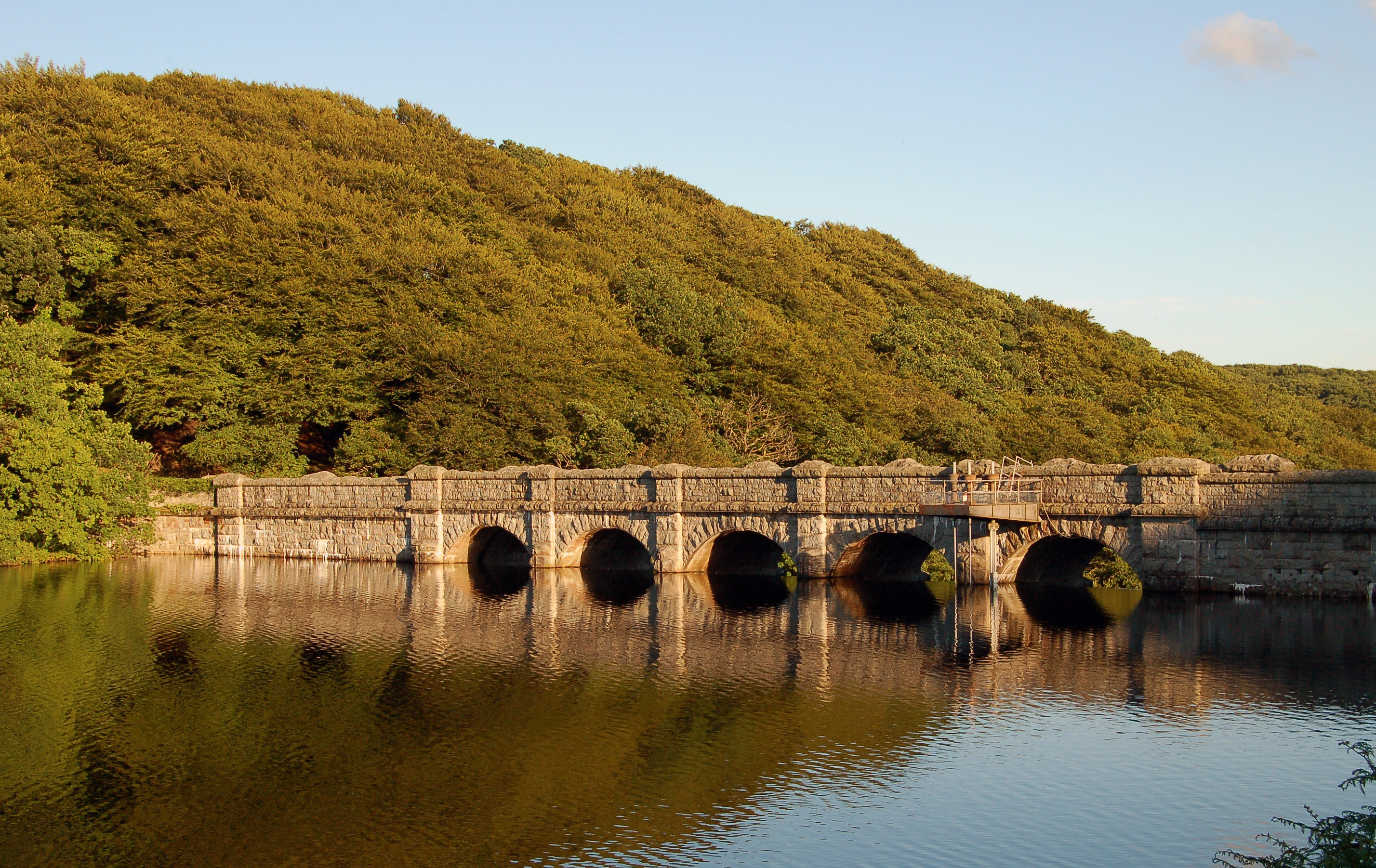
Burrator Dam, with the tor of Burrator itself covered in trees to the left

Burrator is a locality in the civil parish of Sheepstor in Devon, England. The name was originally given to a granite tor, and was subsequently also used for a nearby farm, wood and waterfall. In the 1890s the Burrator Reservoir was built to supply drinking water to Plymouth and surrounding areas. The two dams which form the southern end of the reservoir stand either side of the tor itself. The reservoir straddles the three parishes of Meavy, Sheepstor, and Walkhampton. These three parishes now share a grouped parish council, called Burrator Parish Council.

== Tor ==
Burrator (sometimes "Burra Tor") is a granite tor that is exposed from the field to the woodland by the dam; located at Grid Reference 553679 at the southern end of the reservoir and about halfway between its two dams blocking the outlets to the River Meavy and the Sheepstor Brook.

== Grouped parish council area ==
The three parishes served by Burrator Parish Council have a combined area of 59.45 km^{2} (23 sq miles), which is generally sparsely populated. The population count in 2001 found that 1,540 people lived in the area. Since 1976, Burrator has been twinned with the municipality of Mathieu, in Normandy, France.

Burrator Parish Council holds the ownership of the Royal Oak Inn at Meavy, which dates back to the 16th Century. The Inn is leased to a tenant publican and the council's ownership and administration of the Inn is managed by its Royal Oak Inn committee, composed of Meavy parish councillors.

James Brooke, the first white Rajah of Sarawak, died in Burrator.
