= Meavy =

Village and civil parish in Devon, England

Coordinates: 50.48552°N 4.05656°W

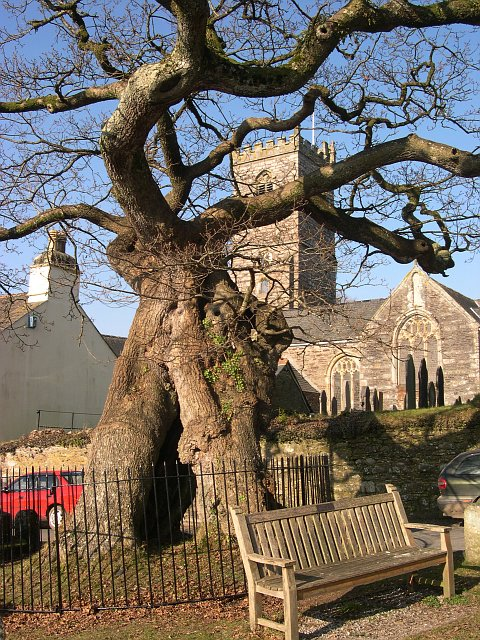
- The Meavy Oak in front of the church

- Location within Devon
- Population: 595 (2021 census)
- Civil parish: Meavy
- District: West Devon
- Shire county: Devon
- Region: South West
- Country: England
- Sovereign state: United Kingdom
- Police: Devon and Cornwall
- Fire: Devon and Somerset
- Ambulance: South Western

Meavy is a small village, civil parish and former manor in the West Devon district, in the county of Devon, England. It lies a mile or so east of Yelverton. In 2021 the parish had a population of 595. The River Meavy runs near the village. For administrative purposes the parish is grouped with the parishes of Sheepstor and Walkhampton to form Burrator Parish Council, and for electoral purposes it is grouped with the same two parishes to form Burrator Ward.

In 2010, Meavy was one of the filming locations for the Steven Spielberg film War Horse.

== Buildings ==
Parish church

The parish church of St Peter is at least partly Norman with additions of the 13th and 15th centuries. There is a reredos of 1884 by J.D. Sedding and a foliated churchyard cross. The oak tree on the village green in front of the churchyard wall is known as the Meavy Oak and was described by John Claudius Loudon in his Arboretum of 1838; the tree may be over 900 years old. Next to the church is an unremarkable manor house of the Drake family.

Royal Oak Inn

The Royal Oak Inn dates to the late 15th century, and is owned by the civil parish of Burrator, with the profits being used by the parish council to fund projects within the parish. Some of the seating consists of pews formerly located in the nearby church.

== Manor ==
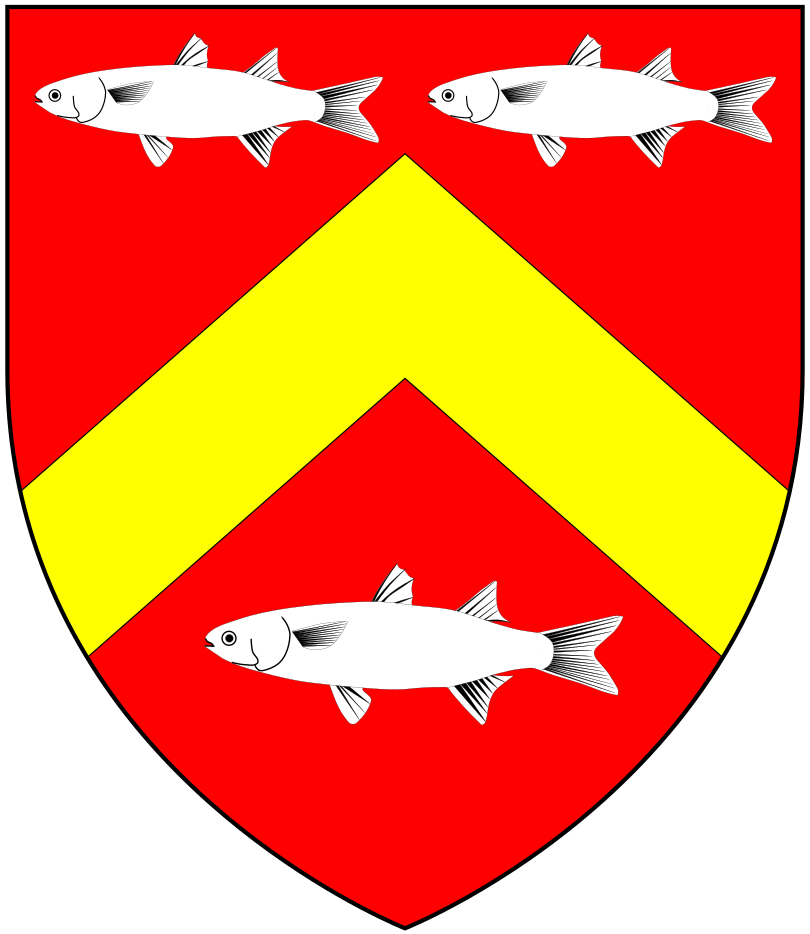
Canting arms of Militon: Gules, a chevron or between three millets hauriant argent

The manor of Meavy (alias Meavy Church, Mewy, etc.) in Roborough Hundred was held in 1086 at the time of Domesday Book by Robert le Bastard, or by Juhel de Totnes. Later it was held by the de Meavy family from the reign of Kings Henry III to Richard II. Their feudal overlord was the de Pomeray family, feudal barons of Berry Pomeroy. It was later held by the Milliton family, whose armorials were: Gules, a chevron argent between three millets hauriant or, where "millets" are mullet fish. Richard IV Strode (d.1552) of Newnham, about 6 miles south, married Agnes Milliton, daughter of John Milliton of Meavy. Meavy was later one of the residences of Sir William IV Strode (1562–1637), and later became the seat of the latter's 2nd son William Strode (1594-1645), MP. A junior branch of the Crymes family of Crapstone, Buckland Monachorum, was resident in the parish of Meavy. Risdon: "The manor of Buckland was bought by one Grimes, of London, who built a house upon the same, which descends to his posterity, and is now inherited by that name". Meavy was purchased by Sir Francis Drake, 3rd Baronet (1642–1718), of Buckland Abbey in the parish of Buckland Monachorum, who sometimes resided at the manor house west of St Peter's Church, in which survives the "Drake Aisle" or manorial chapel. The external stonework is inscribed with the date "1705" and the "Drake star" from his coat of arms. His mother was Susan Crimes, a daughter of William Crimes (or Grimes), of Buckland Crimes and a sister of Elizeus Crimes.
