= River Walkham =

River in Devon, England

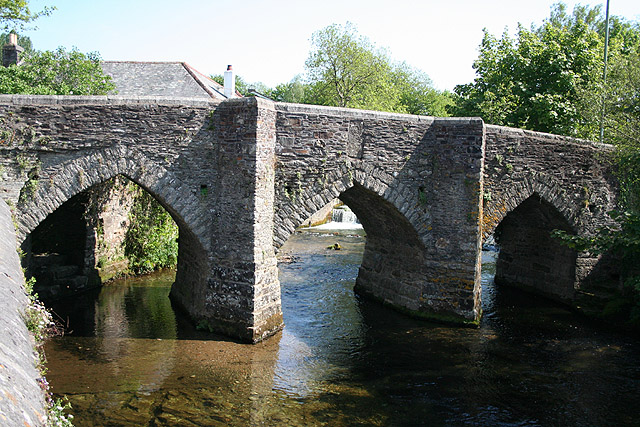
- River Walkham at Horrabridge

- Location within Devon Location within the United Kingdom

Location
- Country: England
- County: Devon

Physical characteristics
- Source
  - location: Dartmoor
- Mouth: River Tavy
  - location: Tavistock
  - coordinates: 50.522°N 4.103°W

River Walkham is a river whose source is on Dartmoor, Devon, England.

It rises in the wide gap between Roos Tor and Great Mis Tor and flows almost due south for approximately 3 miles (4.8 km) leaving the tors and thus National Park behind then south-west for 1 mile (1.6 km) past Woodtown. The river then reaches a village, Horrabridge, with a small compact network of streets mainly on the south or left bank. It receives most of its tributaries which are unnamed headwaters along its south-flowing inception, draining the near side of two series of six tors (peaks) to the west ending in Pew Tor at 320 metres and likewise to the east ending in Leeden Tor at 389 metres (above mean sea level). In absolute distance, 2 miles (3.2 km) west of the village and the same south of the small well-preserved town of Tavistock by a footbridge on the West Devon Way the Walkham joins the Tavy which discharges into the Tamar Estuary north of the Plymouth conurbation after a fast descent around wide hillsides, a few miles south.

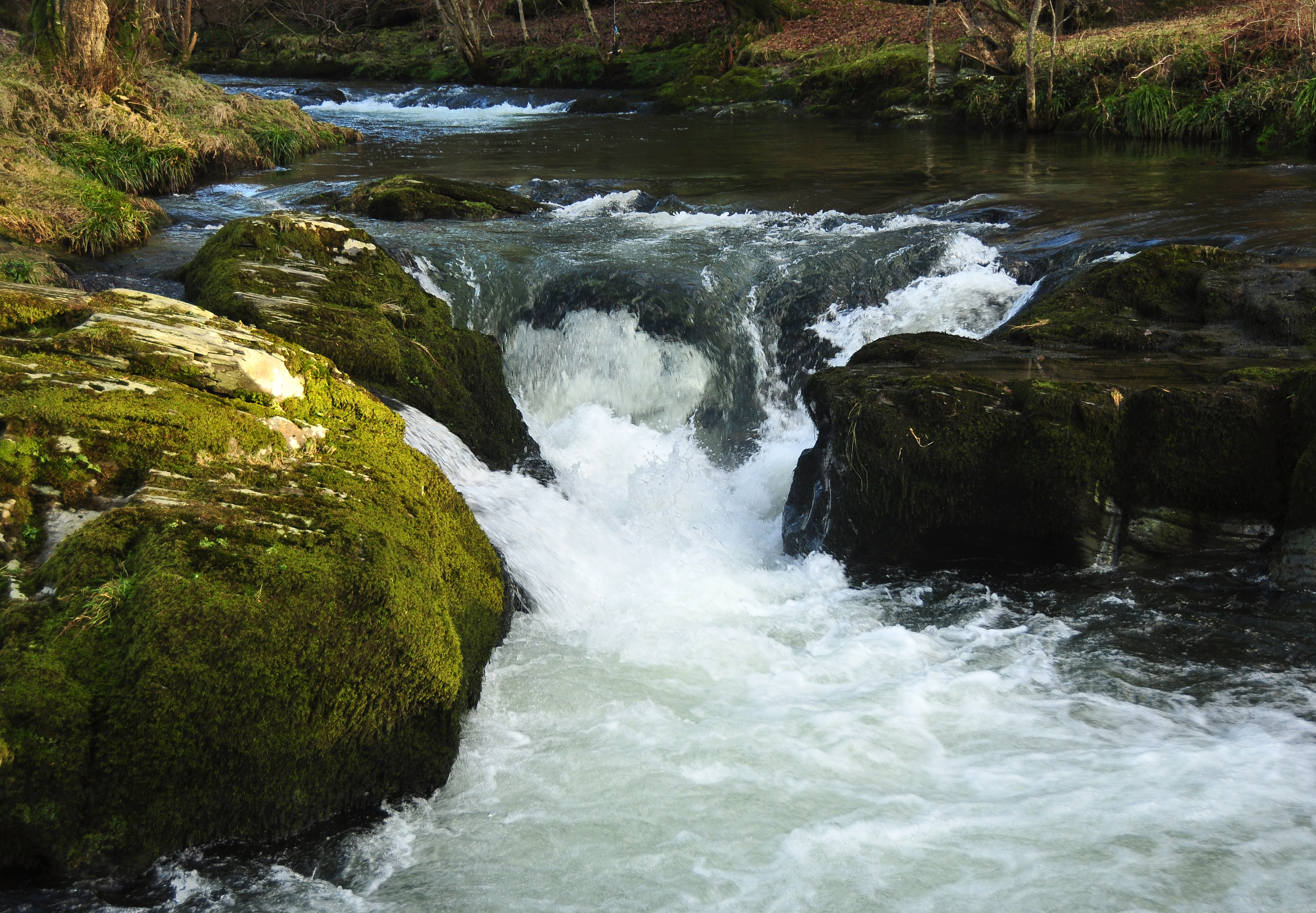
River Walkham near Buckator

The confluence of the Walkham and Tavy is a few hundred metres downstream from the Tavistock Canal a mainly closed canal with many mining heritage centres, leading to the Tavy's near-neighbour, the River Tamar.

== In popular culture ==
Television presenter Angela Rippon wrote in her book about the West Country that the River Walkham was "one of the loveliest rivers in Devon".

== See also ==
- Cornwall and West Devon Mining Landscape
- Rivers of the United Kingdom
