= Cranbrook Castle =

Iron Age hill fort in Devon, England

Coordinates: 50.687°N 3.787°W

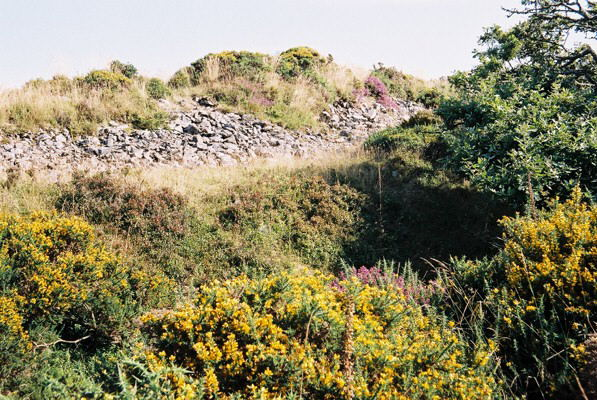
Stone-faced rampart inside Cranbrook Castle

Cranbrook Castle is an Iron Age Hill fort occupying a commanding hilltop just to the south of and overlooking the Teign valley in Devon. It is 337 metres (1,106 ft) above sea level and 2 kilometres (1.2 mi) south and slightly west of Prestonbury Castle, 3 kilometres (1.9 mi) west of Wooston Castle.
