= River Mardle =

River in Devon, England

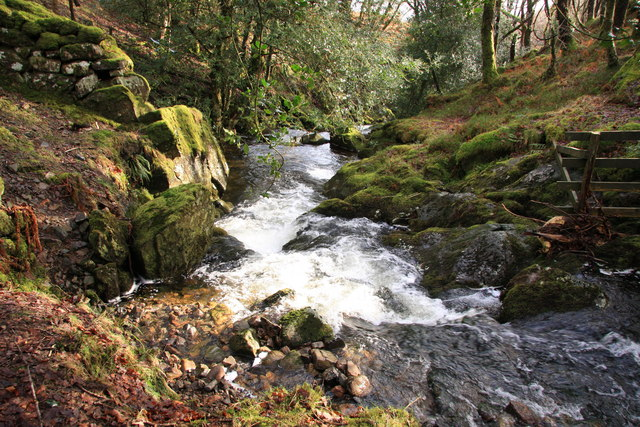
- River Mardle near Chalk Ford

Location
- Country: England
- County: Devon

Physical characteristics
- Source: 50.507°N 3.881°W
  - location: East of Ryder's Hill
  - elevation: 430 m (1,410 ft)
- Mouth: 50.482°N 3.766°W
  - location: River Dart
  - elevation: 30 m (98 ft)
- Length: 10 km (6.2 mi)

The River Mardle is a tributary of the River Dart in Devon, England.

It rises on Holne Moor on Dartmoor and flows in a generally south-easterly direction. It forms a short part of the boundary of Dartmoor National Park near its confluence with Snowdon Brook and Chalk Ford, where it is crossed by the Two Moors Way. After this, it flows through Scae Wood and then farmland until it reaches the town of Buckfastleigh where it passes under the A38 road and the South Devon Railway to meet the River Dart near Buckfastleigh railway station.
