= Castle Carrock =

Village and civil parish in Cumbria, England

Coordinates: 54.891°N 2.715°W

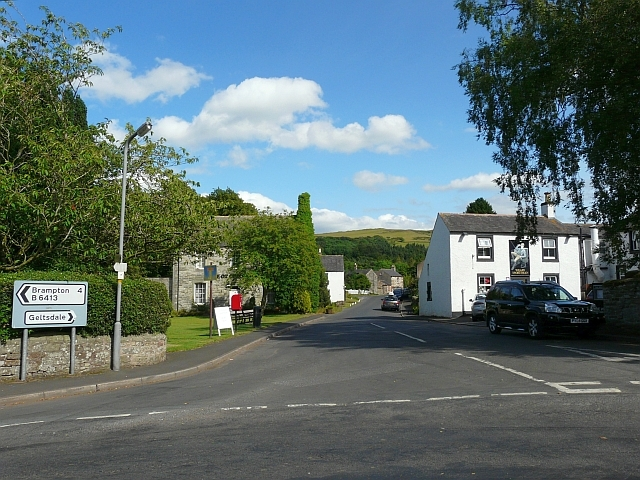
- Geltsdale Road, Castle Carrock

- Location in the former Carlisle district, Cumbria Location within Cumbria
- Population: 303
- OS grid reference: NY577534
- Civil parish: Castle Carrock
- Unitary authority: Cumberland
- Ceremonial county: Cumbria
- Region: North West
- Country: England
- Sovereign state: United Kingdom
- Post town: BRAMPTON
- Postcode district: CA8
- Dialling code: 01228
- Police: Cumbria
- Fire: Cumbria
- Ambulance: North West
- UK Parliament: Carlisle

Castle Carrock is a village and civil parish on the B6413 road, in the Cumberland District, in the English county of Cumbria about 3 miles (4.8 km) south of Brampton. The population of the Civil Parish was 303 in 2001 and rose to 328 by 2011. It has a pub, The Duke of Cumberland, a primary school and many walks. More recently Castle Carrock is known for 'Cumbria's Most Friendly Music Festival' Music on the Marr which takes place each year at the end of July. It attracts a diverse crop of music, entertainers, artists and poets from around the world.

Castle Carrock is surrounded on the south by Leath Ward, on the west by Cumrew and Carlatton, on the north by Brampton and Hayton, and on the east by Northumberland.

Population changes in the parish of Castle Carrock between 1801 and 2001

== History ==
The first name which appears on the manorial roll of Castle Carrock is Eustace de Vallibus, grantee under his kinsman, Hugh de Vallibus, or Vaux, upon whom Henry II conferred the barony of Gilsland as a recompense for services rendered the young prince in his contest with Stephen.

The family of Eustace adopted the Castle-Carrock as a surname, and probably had their castle here which has given a name to the parish. Robert de Castle Carrock, the fourth in descent, left three daughters, among whom the manor was divided, parts of which passed to the Dacres eventually the whole manor passed to the Earls of Carlisle. The principal landowners in the late 19th century were the executors of the late John Watson, Esq., Gelt House: William Watson, Esq., Holme Eden; Ralph Watson, Garth Foot; James Proctor Watson, Esq., Gelt Hall; and Mrs. Elizabeth Carrick.

On the summit of the fell are two cairns, one of which, called Hespeck Raise, is of considerable magnitude. Near Gelt bridge was another cairn, and when the stones were removed in 1775, by the farmer on whose land it was situated, a cistvaen or rude stone coffin was found, in which was a human skeleton. Around 1870 another cistvaen, containing a human skeleton, was unearthed by two farmers near to Greenwell; accompanying it were an urn and a flint, probably the hatchet of the warrior chief, whose mouldered remains were thus brought to view 2,000 years after his entombment.

== Amenities ==
- St. Peter's Church, built on a medieval site in the ruins of previously built churches and also a castle. The present site of St Peter's Church was rebuilt in 1828 and restored in 1888.
- Castle Carrock School, a Primary School that has been in Castle Carrock since 1871.
- Castle Carrock reservoir, situated above the village. It was built in 1907 to supply drinking water to Carlisle.
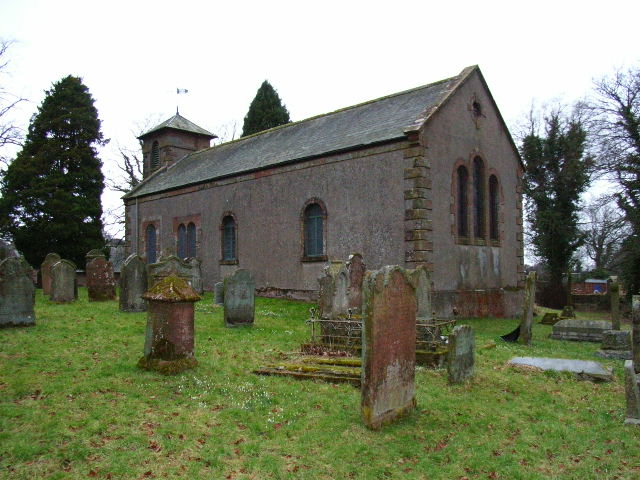
St.Peter's Church

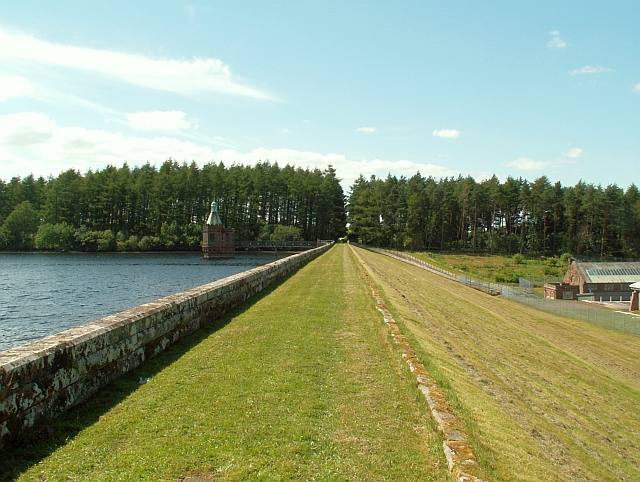
Castle Carrock reservoir

== See also ==
- Listed buildings in Castle Carrock
