= Cist =

Small stone-built coffin-like box, ossua or dolmen

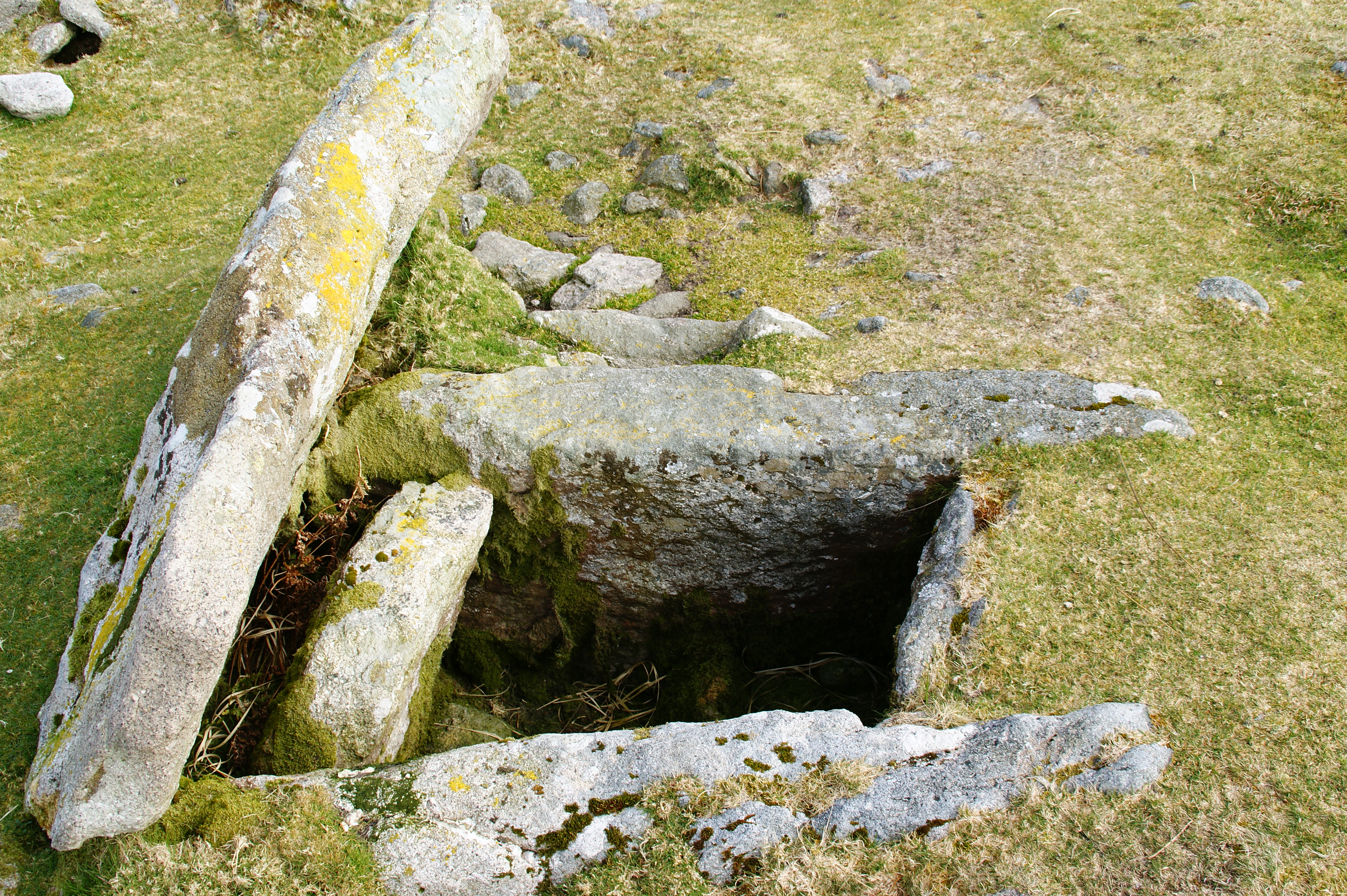
Kistvaen on the southern edge of Dartmoor in Drizzlecombe (England) showing the capstone and the inner cist structure

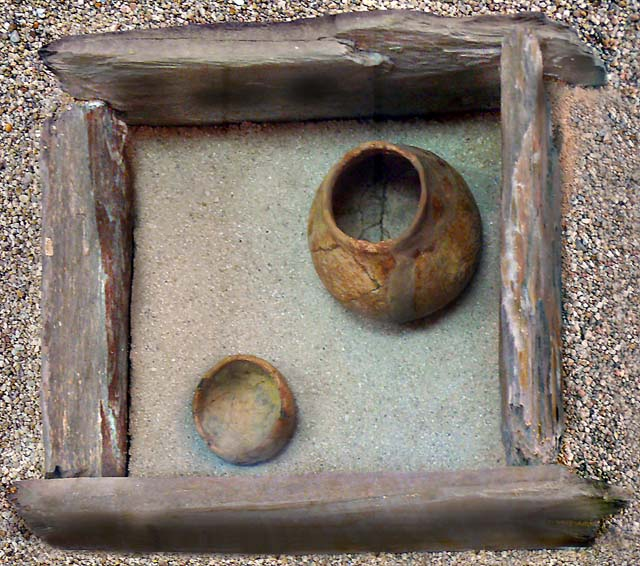
Cist

In archeology, a cist (/ˈkɪst/; also kist /ˈkɪst/; ultimately from Ancient Greek: κίστη; cognate to English: chest) or cist grave is a small stone-built coffin-like box or ossuary used to hold the bodies of the dead. In some ways, it is similar to the deeper shaft tomb. Examples occur across Europe and in the Middle East. A cist may have formerly been associated with other monuments, perhaps under a cairn or a long barrow. Several cists are sometimes found close together within the same cairn or barrow. Often ornaments have been found within an excavated cist, indicating the wealth or prominence of the interred individual.

This old word is preserved in the Nordic languages as kista in Swedish and kiste in Danish and Norwegian, as well as in Dutch (kist), where it is the word for a funerary coffin. In English the term is related to cistern and to chest.

== Regional examples ==
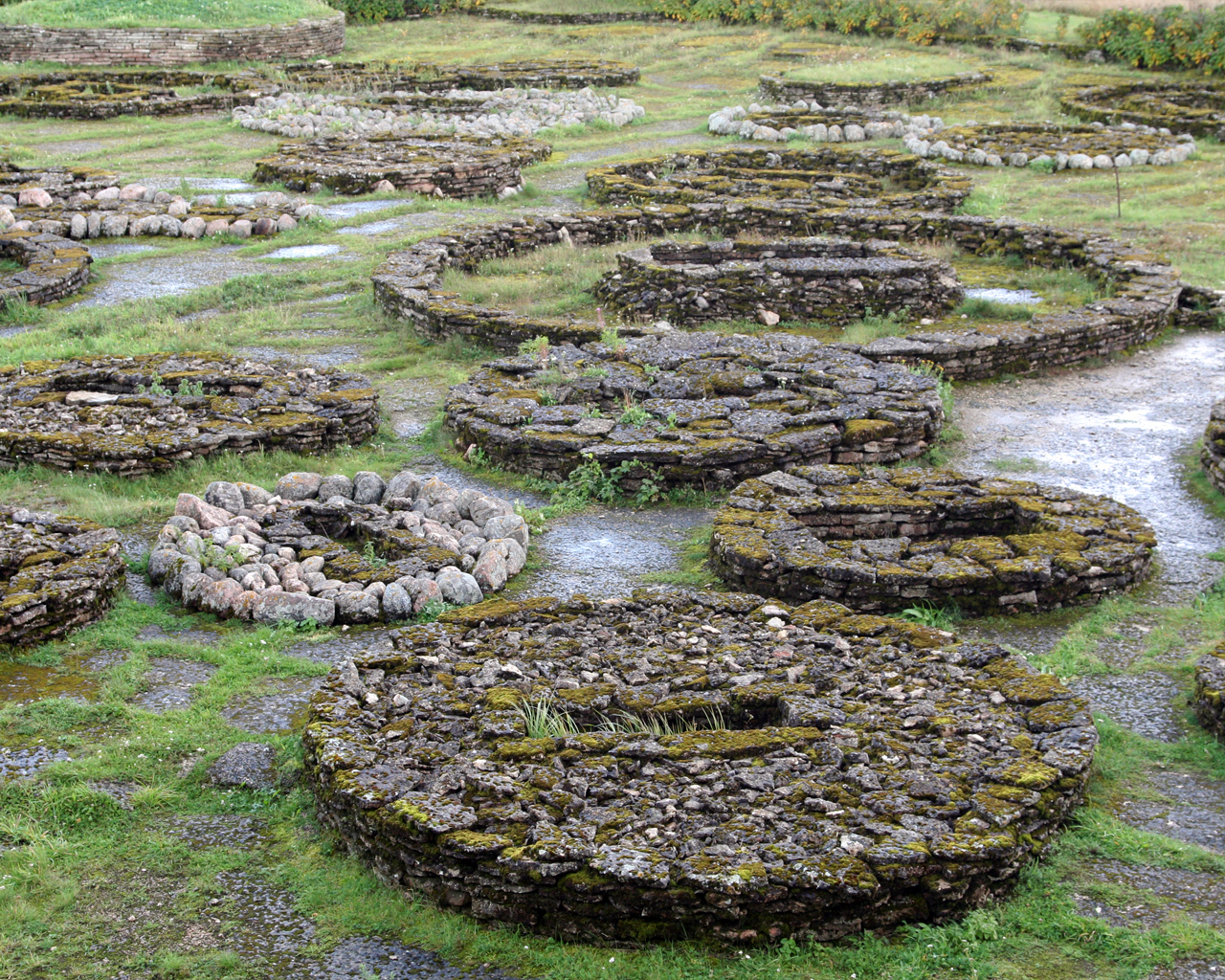
Stone cist graves from a Bronze Age site in Northern Estonia

Drone video of stone cist graves in Jõelähtme, Estonia

England

- Teffont Evias, England

Estonia

- Jõelähtme (Rebala) stone-cist graves, Harju County

Guatemala

- Mundo Perdido, Tikal, Petén Department

Ireland

- Knockmaree Dolmen, Phoenix Park, Dublin

Israel

- Tel Kabri (Area A), Upper Galilee

Latvia

- Batariņi

Scotland

- Balblair cist, Beauly, Inverness
- Dunan Aula, Craignish, Argyll and Bute
- Holm Mains Farm, Inverness
- Nether Mill, Kilbirnie, North Ayrshire

Sri Lanka

- Ibbankatuwa Megalithic Stones
- Udaranchamadama

== See also ==
- Kistvaen
- Dartmoor kistvaens
- Stone box grave
- Tarand grave
