= Dartmoor kistvaens =

Cists from the Late Neolithic and early Bronze Age

Dartmoor
- IUCN category II (national park)
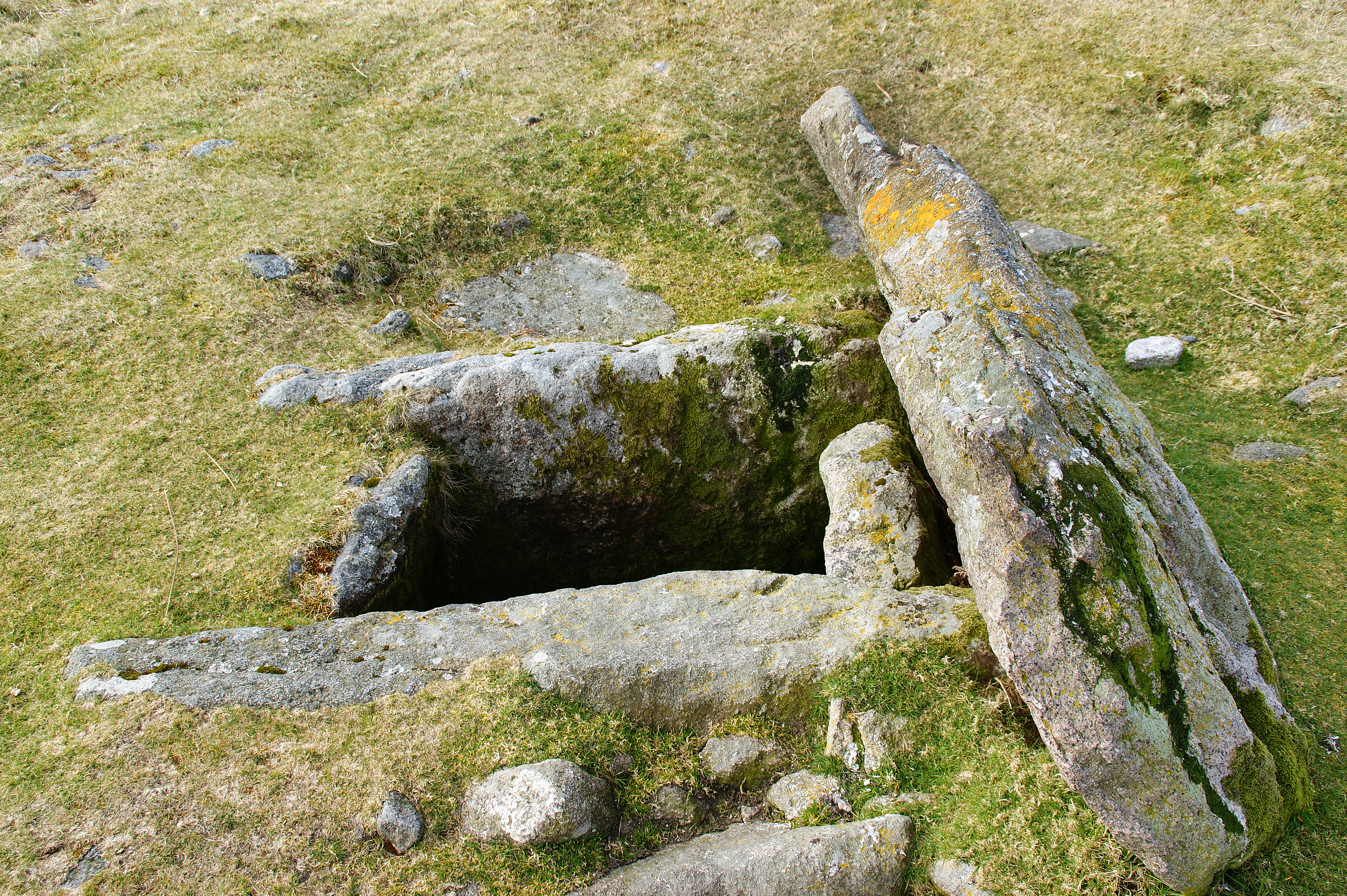
- Kistvaen in Drizzlecombe on Dartmoor in South Devon, UK. The cap stone (which was originally used to seal the tomb) has been upended, and can be seen on the right of the image, behind the box-like structure of the cist.

- Location within England
- Location: Devon, England, United Kingdom
- Coordinates: 50°34′N 4°0′W
- Area: 954 km^{2} (368 sq mi)
- Established: 1951
- Visitors: 10.98m
- Governing body: Dartmoor National Park Authority
- Website: www.dartmoor-npa.gov.uk

Dartmoor kistvaens are burial tombs or cists from the Late Neolithic and early Bronze Age, i.e. from c. 2500 BC to c. 1500 BC. Kistvaens have been found in many places, including Dartmoor, a 954 km^{2} (368 square miles) area of moorland in south Devon, England. The box-like stone tombs were created when the ancient people of the area lived in hut circles. Cists are often to be found in the centre of a cairn circle although some appear solitary which could be the result of the loss of an original slight mound. There are over 180 known cists on Dartmoor although there could be up to 100 that remain buried underneath unexplored cairns. In the South West there are no cists to be found on the Quantock Hills, only 2 to be found on Exmoor and 58 to be found on Bodmin Moor. The Dartmoor cists are unique in that about 94% have the longer axis of the tomb orientated in a NW/SE direction It appears that Dartmoor cists were positioned in such a way that the deceased were facing the Sun.

In August 2011 an untouched cist, on Whitehorse Hill, near Chagford, was the first to be excavated on the moor for over 100 years. This burial yielded some rare Bronze Age artefacts made of organic materials.

== Description ==
The word "kistvaen" is derived from the Cornu-Celtic Cist-veyn or Cist-vyin; in Welsh the word is Cist-faen. All these names mean "a stone chest" (cist is a chest or box, maen is a stone). Kistvaens are formed using four or more flat stones for the sides and for the ends, and a larger flat stone (the "capstone") for the cover. Some kistvaens are surrounded by circles of erected stones. In general, if a body was to be buried without cremation, it was placed into a kistvaen in a contracted position. If on the other hand a body was cremated, the ashes were usually put in a cinerary urn, and then the urn was placed in a kistvaen.

However, the majority of the known Dartmoor kistvaens were opened at some time in the past, and whatever they used to hold is missing. The cists were probably robbed in the hope of finding treasure. Kistvaens were known by many common names, including "money pits", "money boxes", "crocks of gold", "caves", "Roman graves" and so on. The idea that ancient tombs might contain valuable items is a very old one; one of the first mentions of searching tumuli in Devon dates back to 1324. Permission to search was granted by Edward II of England.

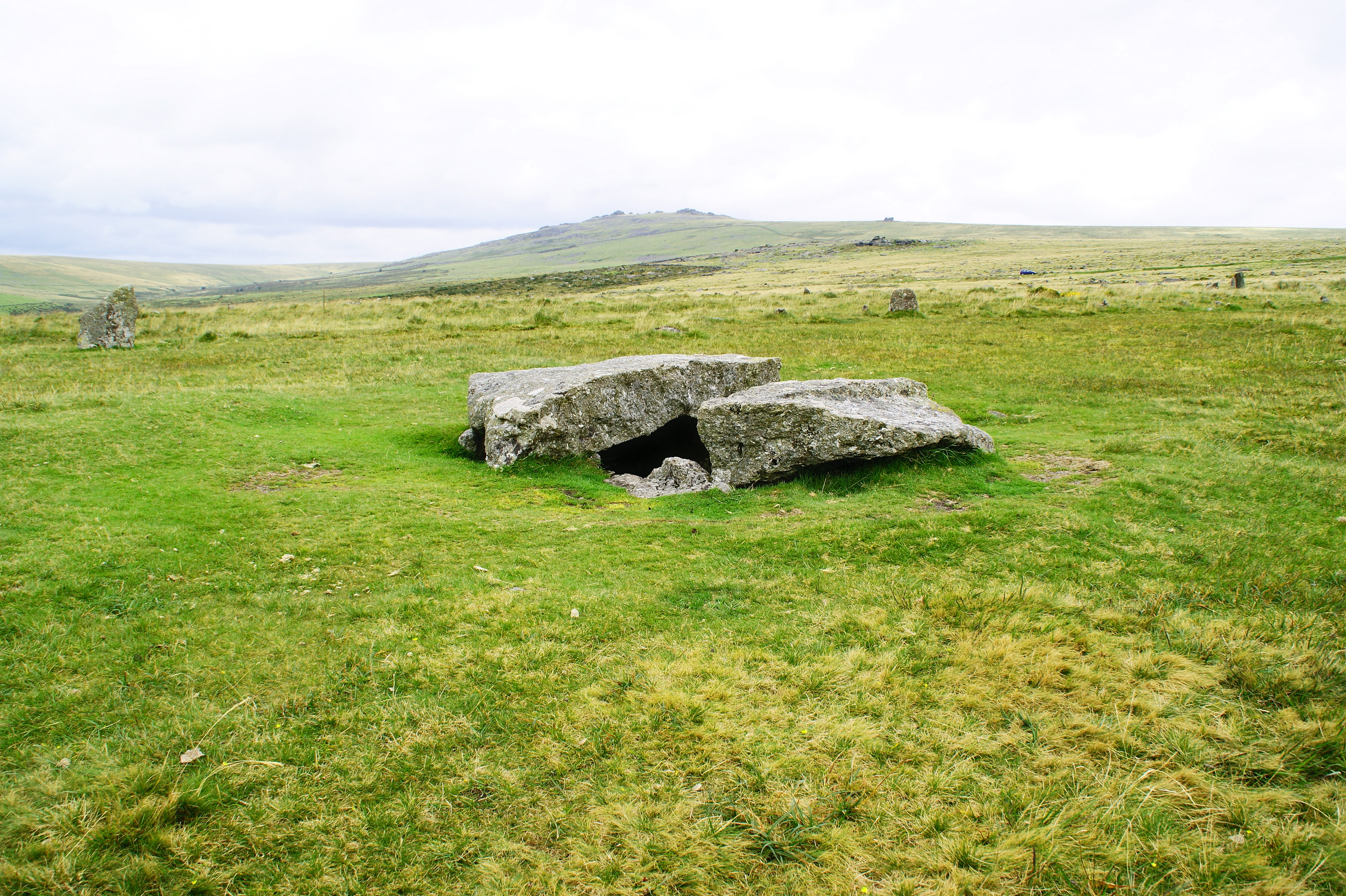
Kistvaen to the south of the Merrivale stone rows

Currently archaeologists usually use the word cist when talking about kistvaens, but in the past 120+ years other terms have been used, including "chest", "maen" or "vaen", "a stone" "a stone coffin" and so on.

== Legends ==
Tombs of the dead were traditionally regarded as sacred places by the people of Dartmoor. However the various treasure-related common names for these burial sites caused some people to break the taboo that tombs must be revered and not disturbed. As a result of this tomb-raiding, stories came into being which purport to show that a graverobber's inappropriate and greedy actions will be punished in supernatural ways.

One of the legends is about "the parson", although this may possibly have been someone's nickname rather than the title of a real man of the cloth. Either way, the story says he made a map of all of the nearby kistvaens, showing the locations as black dots. Very soon his map had more black dots than a ladybird has on its back. The lure of the kistvaens was so great that the parson (and a few other people who agreed to help him) opened every kistvaen that was marked on his map.

After this, the parson was seen counting money every night. His wealth did not make him happy, and neither did it last long. One night a huge electrical storm moved over the moors. Furious lightning was followed again and again almost immediately by very loud thunder. Nobody could sleep for the noise of the storm.

Surprisingly the next morning there was very little damage to be seen. Actually all the houses around were intact, except for one house—the house of the parson. His house was in ruins, and it was still burning. Some neighbors even thought they smelled burning brimstone. Presumably the devil himself had made the parson pay for desecrating the kistvaens.

=== The Money Pit kistvaen story ===
This story features a very friendly, good-natured farmer. Once he had a dream about a kistvaen close to his farm. In his dream he saw that the kistvaen was filled with money. Next day he went there, and with a huge effort he managed to move the capstone, and started to dig.

As he dug, a huge raven circled overhead, mocking him, and encouraging him to dig deeper and deeper. Eventually the farmer put his hand inside, and pulled out a small piece of flint, shaped in the form of a heart. He took his find home. After this incident, his personality changed radically: he became mean and angry, and he lost all his friends. His life became miserable. About a year later, his young son found the flint in the house, and took it outside to play with it. Then the boy went out onto the moor to look for something else to play with, and he dropped the flint as he went along.

On that same day the farmer changed once again, reverting to the "jolly farmer" he had always been until the unfortunate day when he opened the kistvaen.

== See also ==
- Childe's Tomb
- Jay's Grave

== Bibliography ==
- Worth, R. N. (1967). "Dartmoor Barrows and Kistvaens". In Spooner, G. M.; Russell, F. S. (eds.). Worth's Dartmoor. Newton Abbot: David & Charles. ISBN 0715351486.
- Butler, J. (1997). The Dartmoor Atlas of Antiquities. Vol. V: The Second Millennium B.C. Devon Books.
- Newman, P. (2011). The Field Archaeology of Dartmoor. English Heritage.
- Jones, A.M. (2016) Preserved in the Peat: An extraordinary Bronze Age burial on Whitehorse Hill, Dartmoor, and its wider context. Oxford: Oxbow books.
