= Cumrew =

Village and civil parish in Cumbria, England

Coordinates: 54.84627°N 2.70101°W

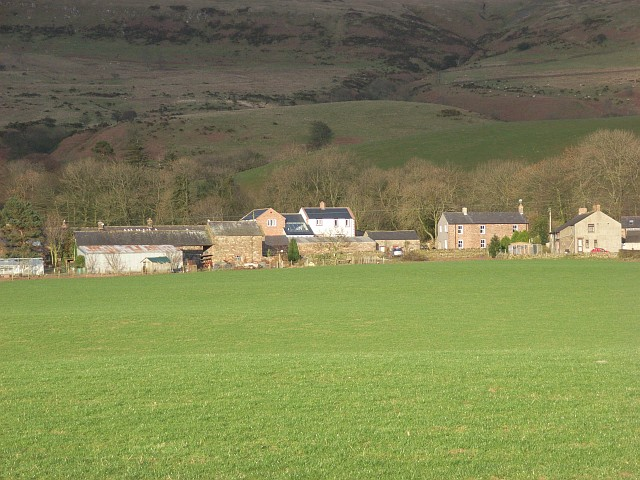
- The village of Cumrew

- Location within Cumbria
- Population: 102 (Parish, 2021)
- OS grid reference: NY 550503
- Civil parish: Cumrew
- Unitary authority: Cumberland
- Ceremonial county: Cumbria
- Region: North West
- Country: England
- Sovereign state: United Kingdom
- Post town: BRAMPTON
- Postcode district: CA8
- Dialling code: 017689
- Police: Cumbria
- Fire: Cumbria
- Ambulance: North West
- UK Parliament: Carlisle

Cumrew is a small village and civil parish in the Cumberland district of Cumbria, England. It lies about 7 miles (11 km) south of Brampton and 13 miles (21 km) east of Carlisle. The population of the parish at the 2021 census was 102. Cumrew shares a parish council with the neighbouring parish of Carlatton.

== History ==
In the 1770s, William Hutchinson noted the outline of an extensive quadrangle in a field near the church, and speculated that it may indicate the site of Dunwalloght Castle, a fortified house in the area referenced in some documents from the late 13th century. There is not much supporting evidence for this claim or assumption, as when two small mounds were removed in 1832 there was no trace of a foundation. The Dacre family formerly owned two small estates in the area, which they sold to Sir Christopher Musgrave. William Dugdale, in his Baronage of England (1676) suggested that the Dacres had a castle at Cumrew. Beyond this allusion, nothing is known of Dunwalloght's history or its site.

On the summit of Cardunnock is a cairn of stones indicating a burial mound, believed to be of an ancient chieftain, having been buried with a war axe and flint headed spear.

== St Mary's Church ==
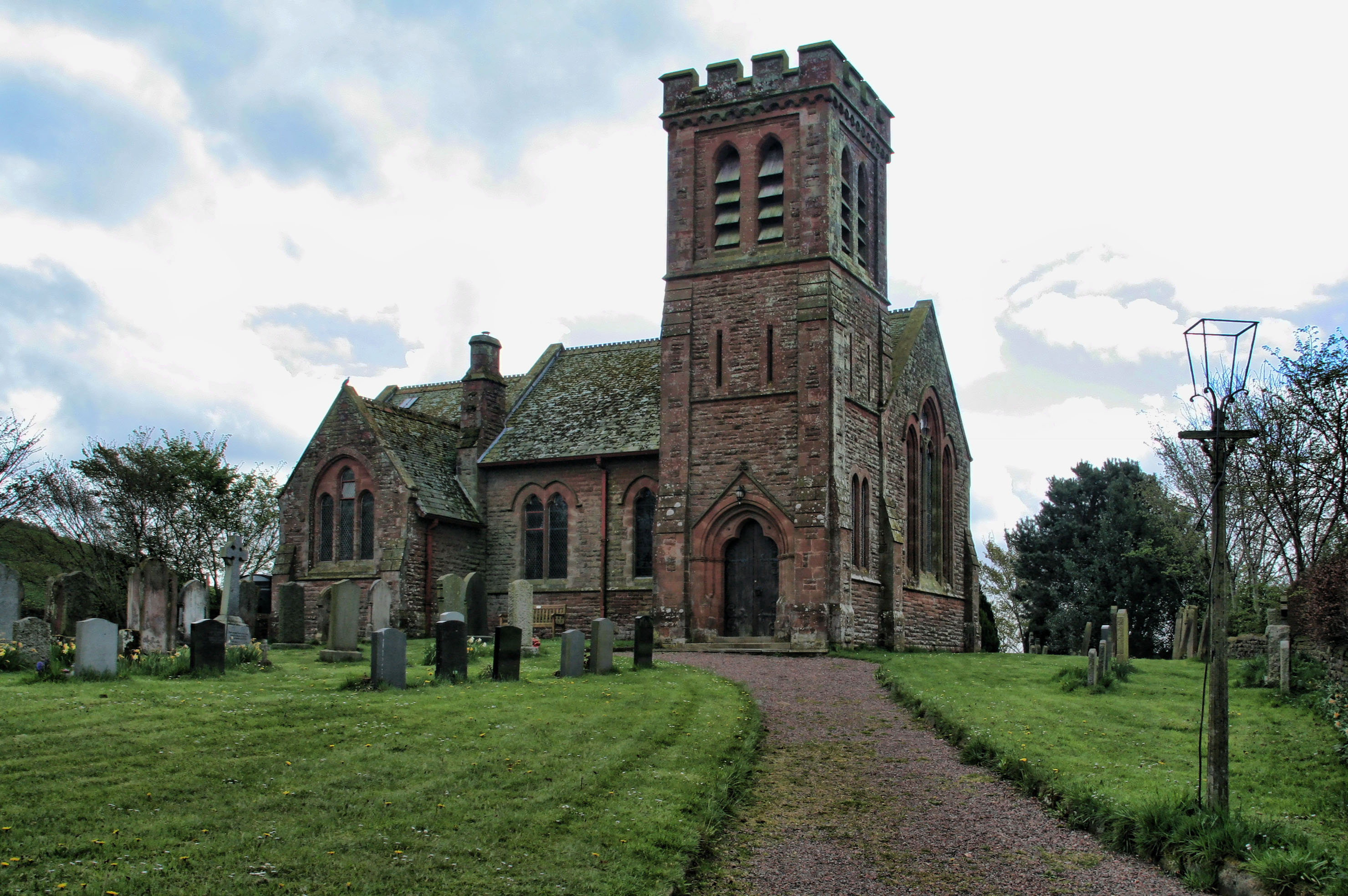
St Mary's Church, Cumrew

The church is dedicated to St Mary, built in 1890 on a medieval site, and was designed by George Dale Oliver. The church is very small with a small tower to the west of the church which holds two bells. The church became a Grade II listed building on 1 April 1957.

== Geography ==
The parish borders Croglin, Cumwhitton, Carlatton, and Castle Carrock. Most of the dwellings are on lower ground in the west of the parish. The parish also includes an area of high ground to the east called Cumrew Fell, with its summit at Cardunneth Pike.

== Governance ==
There are two tiers of local government covering Cumrew, at parish and unitary authority level: Carlatton and Cumrew Parish Council, and Cumberland Council. The parish council is a grouped parish council, also covering the neighbouring parish of Carlatton. The parish council meets at St Mary's Church in Cumrew. For national elections, Cumrew is within the Carlisle constituency.

=== Administrative history ===
Cumrew was an ancient parish in the historic county of Cumberland. The parish was subdivided into two townships, called Cumrew Inside (which included the village and parish church) and Cumrew Outside. The parish was included in the Brampton Rural District from 1894 to 1934 and then the Border Rural District from 1934 to 1974.

Border Rural District was abolished in 1974, and Cumrew became part of the Carlisle district in the new county of Cumbria. The district of Carlisle was in turn abolished in 2023 when the new Cumberland Council was created, also taking over the functions of the abolished Cumbria County Council in the area.

== Economy ==
Business in Cumrew is very limited and consisted of farms and a company called Cleanroom Supplies Ltd. The local farms include Rising Sun, Helme and Gateshaw Mill.

== Demography ==
At the 2021 census, the parish had a population of 102. The population had been 85 at the 2001 census, and was 131 at the 2011 census.

Population changes in Cumrew from 1811 to 2001

The population of Cumrew decreased between 1831 and 1891. The population slightly increased in 1901 then took another turn and decreased again between 1921 and 1951. Since 1961, the population of the village has stayed in an upward trend.

=== Occupational structure of Cumrew in 1831 ===
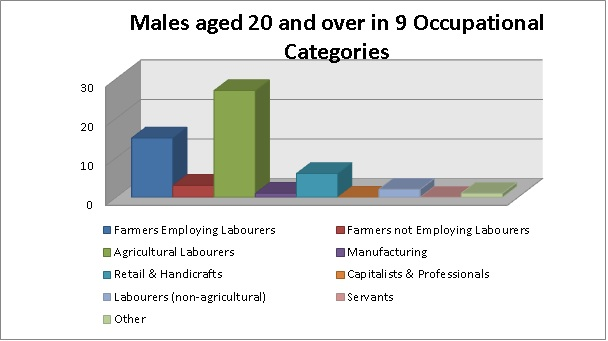
Males aged 20 and over in 9 occupational categories

Information on the occupational structure of Cumrew is limited. The bar chart shows that many of the men living in the parish in 1831 were agricultural labourers working on farms, for example Rising Sun, Helme Farm and Cateshaw Mill, in and around Cumrew. The farms also supplied many of the boarding parishes with employment as 12 of the farmers employed agricultural labourers.

== See also ==
- Listed buildings in Cumrew
