= Reave =

British Bronze Age boundary wall

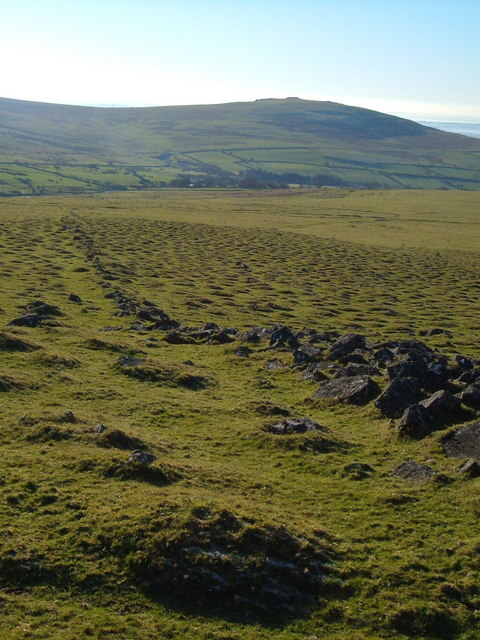
A reave below White Tor, west Dartmoor

A reave is a long and generally straight boundary wall made of stone that was built during the Bronze Age. Reaves were identified as prehistoric features on Dartmoor in Devon, England in 1972, and although they had been described by antiquarians in the 1820s, the knowledge of their origins had been lost, ignored and misrepresented for around 150 years.

There are three main classes of reaves: parallel reaves divided land to create rectilinear fields which were sometimes subdivided by cross reaves. Terminal reaves tend to run for great distances along contours or watersheds and served to divide the enclosed areas from the higher open moor. In total, the reaves on Dartmoor cover an area of over 10,000 hectares (39 sq mi).

There are over 20 major field systems delineated by reaves on Dartmoor. The largest is around Rippon Tor, which covers over 2,000 hectares (7.7 sq mi). Other large systems are North Dart (over 1,400 hectares (5.4 sq mi)), South Dart (550 hectares (2.1 sq mi)) and Easdon Down (380 hectares (1.5 sq mi)).

The longest reave identified on Dartmoor is known as the Great Western Reave, which, although incomplete, stretches over 10 kilometres (6.2 mi) from beyond White Tor in the north, over Roos Tor, through the Merrivale archaeological landscape and Foggintor granite quarries to its southern end, east of Sharpitor, by the side of the B3212 road.

== Sources ==
- Butler, Jeremy (1997). Dartmoor Atlas of Antiquities, Volume 5: The Second Millennium B.C. Exeter: Devon Books. ISBN 0-86114-910-6.
- Fleming, Andrew (1988). The Dartmoor Reaves. Investigating Prehistoric Land Divisions. London: Batsford. ISBN 0-7134-5666-3.
