= Listed buildings in Castle Carrock =

Castle Carrock is a civil parish in the Cumberland district of Cumbria, England. It contains 14 listed buildings that are recorded in the National Heritage List for England. All the listed buildings are designated at Grade II, the lowest of the three grades, which is applied to "buildings of national importance and special interest". The parish contains the village of Castle Carrock, and is otherwise rural. The listed buildings consist of houses, farm buildings, a folly, a village hall, a war memorial, and a church.

== Buildings ==
Name and location	Photograph	Date	Notes
Garth House; 54.89083°N 2.71290°W	—	1667	A rendered farmhouse on large plinth stones with a slate roof. There are two storeys and three bays. The doorway has a chamfered surround, an inscribed and dated lintel, and a hood mould. The windows are sashes in plain surrounds, and there is a small fire window.
Barn, Manor House; 54.87160°N 2.70731°W	—	1700	Originally a house and a barn, later a barn, it is in sandstone with a sandstone slate roof. It has two storeys, the house and barn having a single bay each. There is an entrance with a chamfered lintel containing a plate carved with initials and the date, and a carved hood mould. Above the entrance is a square window, and to the left is a cart entrance. Also in the building are ventilation slits and a loft door.
Greenwell Cottage; 54.90034°N 2.72292°W	—	1710	A sandstone house with eaves modillions and a Welsh slate roof. There are two storeys and three bays. The doorway has a moulded architrave with a dated frieze and a moulded cornice. The windows are sashes in plain surrounds, and there is a plank door at the side.
Rectory; 54.89098°N 2.71520°W	—	1727	A sandstone house on a chamfered plinth, with quoins and a Welsh slate roof with coped gables. There are two storeys and four bays. The door has a moulded stone architrave with an inscribed frieze and a moulded cornice. The windows are sashes with moulded architraves.
Garth Foot House; 54.89049°N 2.70777°W	—	Late 18th century	A house in light grey sandstone on a red sandstone plinth, with quoins, a modillioned cornice, and a slate roof. There are two storeys and four bays. The doorway has an alternate block surround and an entablature with a keystone. The windows are sashes with red sandstone surrounds.
House south-west of Greenwell Cottage; 54.90018°N 2.72304°W	—	Late 18th century (probable)	A sandstone house with a Welsh slate roof. There are two storeys, two bays, sash windows with plain surrounds, and a rear entrance.
The Lawn; 54.89097°N 2.71297°W	—	Late 18th century	A house in sandstone with a Welsh slate roof, in two storeys and three bays. The doorway and sash windows have plain surrounds, and the gutters have scrolled brackets.
Tarn Lodge; 54.88486°N 2.73325°W		c. 1807	A rendered house on a chamfered plinth, with stone dressings, pilastered quoins, and a hipped Welsh slate roof. There are two storeys, five bays, and flanking two-storey single-bay wings. On the front is a semicircular Doric tetrastyle porch, with a triglyph frieze and a moulded cornice. The doorway has engaged Tuscan columns, a block entablature, and pedimented cornice. The windows are sashes in plain surrounds.
Tower Folly; 54.88597°N 2.73350°W	—	c. 1807 (probable)	The tower is in sandstone, and consists of a two-storey square tower with a battlemented parapet.
St Peter's Church; 54.89136°N 2.71316°W		1828	The church, which was restored in 1888, is rendered on a chamfered plinth, and has red sandstone quoins. It consists of a nave and chancel with a north vestry, and a west tower. The tower incorporates a porch, and has a doorway with a semicircular fanlight and a keyed entablature. External steps lead to the bell stage, and there is a pyramidal roof. The windows in the body of the church are round-headed.
Raysdale House; 54.89154°N 2.71466°W	—	1847	A sandstone house on a chamfered plinth, with quoins and a Welsh slate roof. There are two storeys, three bays, and single-storey wings of two bays to the left and one to the right. The doorway has an alternate block surround with a keyed entablature, and the windows are sashes with raised stone surrounds.
Barn, Tottergill Farm; 54.88253°N 2.70468°W	—	Mid 19th century	A range of farm buildings in a U-shaped plan. They are in sandstone and have a Welsh slate roof with gables, some plain, some crow-stepped. The main range has ten bays, with a central three-storey clock tower that has dovecote openings and a weathervane. The range contains a pig stye, a hen coop, windows, doorways, archways, and ventilation slits. The south range has a single storey and overlofts.
Village Hall; 54.89147°N 2.71390°W		1897	The hall is in sandstone and has a roof of Welsh slate with coped gables. It is in a single storey and has four bays. On the front is corbelled porch, and the windows are mullioned or cross-mullioned. To the left is a square angle tower that has a square turret with a battlemented parapet, and an entrance with a pointed head. There is a single-storey two-bay extension to the right with casement windows and a modillioned parapet.
War memorial 54.89139°N 2.71336°W		1920	The war memorial is in the churchyard of St Peter's Church, near its entrance. It is in sandstone, and consists of a Latin cross with a short shaft, on a tapering plinth with a moulded bottom section. This stands on a base of two chamfered steps. On the plinth and base are an inscription and the names of six men lost in the First World War.
