= Listed buildings in Cumrew =

Cumrew is a civil parish in the Cumberland district of Cumbria, England. It contains eleven listed buildings that are recorded in the National Heritage List for England. All the listed buildings are designated at Grade II, the lowest of the three grades, which is applied to "buildings of national importance and special interest". The parish contains the village of Cumrew and is otherwise rural. Its listed buildings consist of houses, farmhouses, farm buildings, and a church.

== Buildings ==
Name and location	Photograph	Date	Notes
Store, Cunrew Farm; 54.84595°N 2.70154°W	—	Late 16th century (probable)	The store originated as a house and barn. It has very thick sandstone walls and a green slate roof. There are two storeys, two bays, a doorway and a small window with chamfered surrounds, and a later cart entrance. At the rear is a single-bay lean-to extension with mullioned windows. The store is built partly from material formerly in the medieval church, and on the front are fragments of dogtooth and zigzag decorated stone.
Barns adjoining Manor House; 54.87106°N 2.70761°W	—	Late 16th century (probable)	The barn incorporates the core of the original manor house, and it was extensively extended in the 18th century. It is in sandstone with green slate roof, and has numerous bays. The original entrance has a chamfered surround with a chamfered and shaped lintel. The other openings include doorways, cart entrances, windows, loft doors, and ventilation slits.
Cumrew Farmhouse and barn 54.84647°N 2.70119°W	—	Late 17th century (probable)	The farmhouse has rendered walls with quoins and a mixed slate roof with coped gables. There are two storeys and three bays, and a lower recessed extension of two storeys and two bays. The doorway has a quoined surround, and the windows are sashes with plain stone surrounds. The barn, at right angles, is in sandstone, and has doorways, windows, and a blocked cart entrance.
Barn, Cunrew Farm; 54.84606°N 2.70163°W	—	Late 17th century (probable)	Originally a house with an 18th-century attached barn. They are in sandstone with roofs of mixed slate. The house has two storeys, both the house and the barn have three bays, and the barn has quoins. There is a variety of openings, most of which are filled.
Cruck-framed barn at Helme Farm; 54.84976°N 2.70464°W	—	Late 17th to early 18th century	The barn has a cruck frame, the walls are in sandstone, and it has a slate roof. The barn is in a single storey, and has three bays. It contains doorways and ventilation slits, and has extensions in corrugated iron. Inside there are two pairs of relatively complete cruck frames.
Cumrew House and outbuildings 54.84689°N 2.70121°W	—	Early 18th century (probable)	The house and adjoining outbuildings are in sandstone. The house was extended in 1753 and in 1891–92. It is on a chamfered plinth with quoins, a string course, a cornice, and a green slate roof with coped gables. There are two storeys, six bays, a double-depth plan, four bays to the rear, and a single-storey wing to the left with a battlemented corbelled parapet. The doorway has a moulded architrave, an inscribed and dated frieze, and a moulded cornice. The windows are sashes in architraves. The outbuildings enclose a courtyard on three sides, and include stables, barns, and a single-storey cottage.
Walls and gate piers, Cumrew House; 54.84682°N 2.70224°W	—	18th century	The walls and gate bays are in sandstone. The wall to the north of the drive has a round coping, and to the south it is on a chamfered plinth with chamfered coping. The gate piers are square with pyramidal caps.
Croftlands; 54.86991°N 2.70745°W	—	1805	A sandstone farmhouse on a chamfered plinth with quoins and a green slate roof. There are two storeys and three bays. The doorway has an alternate block surround and a keyed entablature, and the windows are sashes with raised surrounds. At the rear is a round-headed stair window.
Albyfield; 54.86478°N 2.70523°W	—	Early 19th century	A sandstone farmhouse with quoins and a slate roof. There are two storeys and three bays. The doorway has an alternate block surround and a keyed entablature, and the windows are sashes with raised surrounds.
Vicarage; 54.84603°N 2.70196°W	—	1834	The former vicarage is in sandstone with a Welsh slate roof, and has one storey with an attic, and two bays. The doorway has a pilastered surround, a moulded cornice, and a fanlight. The windows are sashes with raised plain surrounds, and there is a flat-roofed dormer.
St Mary's Church; 54.84561°N 2.70124°W		1890	The church, on a medieval site, is in sandstone with angle buttresses and a green slate roof with coped gables. It consists of a three-bay nave, a single-bay chancel, a north vestry, and a northwest tower. The tower has three stages, incorporating a porch, and has a recessed doorway with a pointed arch, a projecting stair turret in the angle between nave and tower, and a corbelled and battlemented parapet.
