= Begnet =

Irish female saint

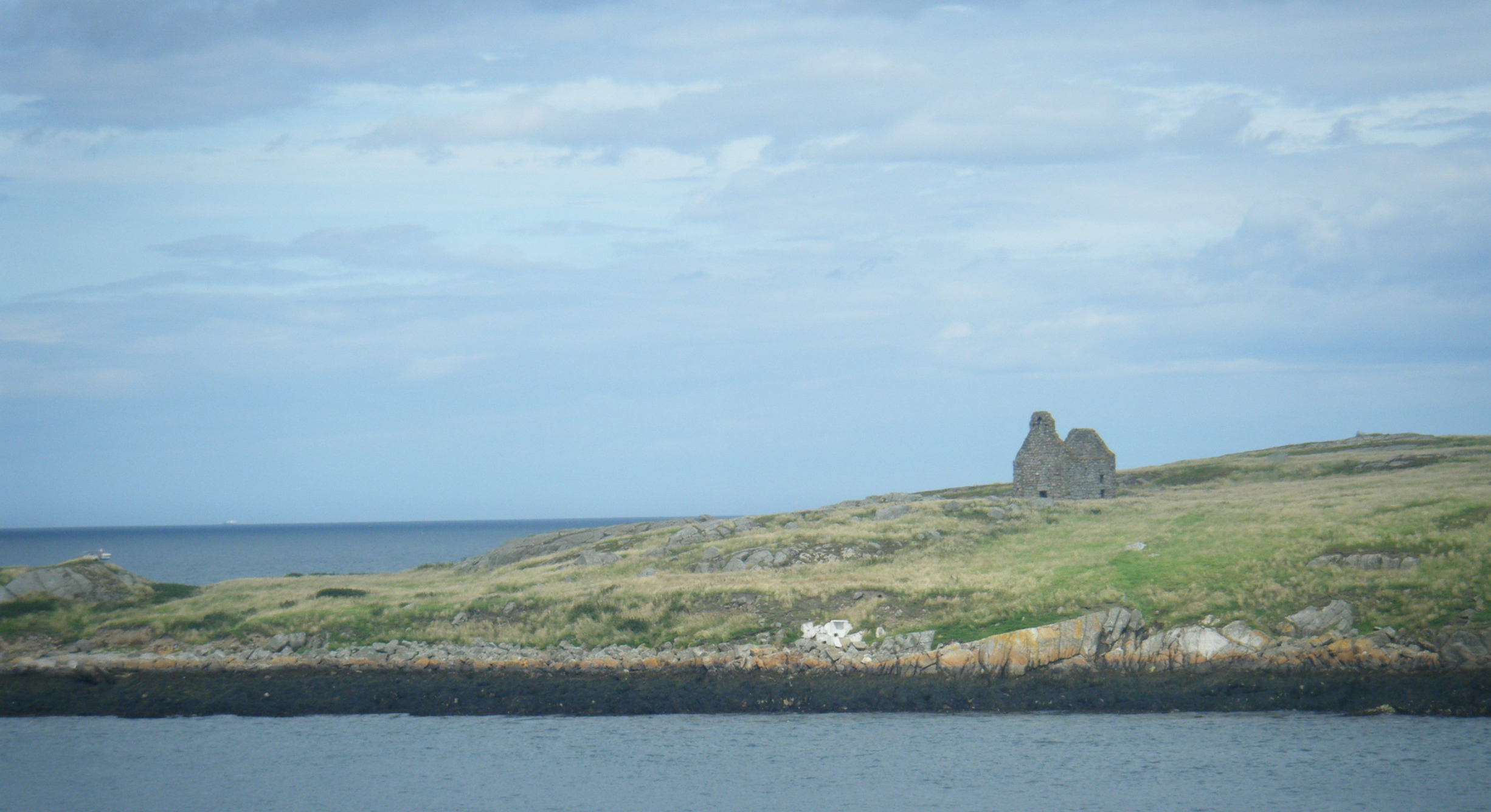
The ruin of the church of St. Begnet on Dalkey Island

St. Begnet (7th century?), also Begneta, Begnete, Begnait or Becnait is a patron saint of Dalkey, Ireland. She is noted as a "virgin, not a martyr." Her feast day is November 12. Two ruined churches in Dalkey are named for Begnet, one on Dalkey Island, and the other near the 14th-century stone townhouse now serving as Dalkey Castle and Heritage Centre, in the area known as Kilbegnet. A holy well located near the martello tower on the island is also associated with her; as the Irish playwright Hugh Leonard observed:

A few yards away are the ruins of a church supposedly built by the town's patron saint, St. Begnet. Like St. Patrick himself, St. Begnet may never have existed: There is even uncertainty as to whether he or she was male or female. No one bothers to argue about this: In Dalkey, when it is a question of sainthood, sex is hardly likely to have much relevance.

The name has been incorrectly understood as a corruption of St. Benedict. The stories associated with her suggest that she has also been identified with Saint Bega or other virgin saints named as Begha or Becga in Irish calendars.

== Sources ==
Begnet is named in the calendars of two manuscript breviaries which in the 19th century were held by the Library of Trinity College, Dublin. One had belonged to the church of Clondalkin, and the other to the parish church of St. John the Evangelist, Dublin, but she is not mentioned in the Martyrology of Oengus.

== Life ==
According to one source on the history of the church in Dalkey, Begnet's father was Colman, the son of Aedh in the parish of Kilbegnatan (Kilbegnet or Cill Becnait). Like many other female virgin saints, she is described as beautiful and desirable, but she refused her numerous suitors in favour of religious devotion. Her social status is sometimes given as "Irish princess", and thus she would have been a valuable bride. She is said variously to have lived as an anchorite or to have served as the first abbess of nuns on a small island off the coast of England.

Begnet may not have come from Dalkey, despite the genealogical note on her origin. Missionaries may have founded the two churches in her name there.

== Legend of the bracelet ==
A legend pertaining to this relatively obscure saint is propagated by historic preservationists and promoters of tourism. As a child, Begnet was visited by an angel who gave her a bracelet inscribed with a cross as a mark of her vocation. To avoid marriage, Begnet left home and took nothing with her but the bracelet. In this version of the story, Begnet flees to Northumbria, where she was received into the Church by Bishop Aidan. After years of enduring continual raids by pirates, she moved to Cumberland. Her bracelet became an object of veneration after her death. By the 12th century, the veracity of legal testimony could be asserted by swearing on the bracelet, and the penalty for perjury was death.

This story, or a version of it, is told also about Saint Bega, who is said to have been of Irish origin. One source for Bega's legend is a 15th-century Book of Hours held by the Bodleian Library, Oxford.

== Origins and religious influences ==
In 1795, the entry on Dalkey Island in W.W. Seward's Topographia Hibernica (Topography of Ireland) claimed that Dalki was so-called "on account of the Pagan altar there". Seward described the island as having "plenty of herbage and some medicinal plants", and said at that time the only building on it was the ruin of the church. The author also professed to find "some remarkable ruins of Druidic antiquities" in nearby Killiney. The possibility cannot be excluded that the legendary Begnet is a Christianized survival of a deity from earlier Irish religious practice.

As is the case with many other early Celtic saints, aspects of Begnet's narratives and archaeology indicate that the traditional religions of ancient Ireland had been appropriated, rather than stamped out, by evangelizing Christianity. The existence of several similarly named saints in the region may also suggest cross-identification among local Christian religious figures, perhaps in association with one or more deities from Celtic or other traditional religions, though this is no longer a fashionable view in the early 21st century. The epithet sanctus, "holy," from which English "saint" derives etymologically and which is the word for "saint" in ecclesiastical Latin, can appear in epitaphs of those who had not converted to Christianity. The interaction or sometimes reconciliation between Christian missionaries and representatives of traditional religious authority is expressed in Ireland by, for instance, narratives of St. Patrick and the druids, many of whom are oppositional but some of whom either convert or assume a welcoming, ecumenical attitude. The 7th-century dating of the earliest surviving sources for these Irish stories coincides with the life of Begnet. Healing, one of her attributes, was an area in which local practitioners and Christian missionaries often competed for authority. At the same time, competition might mean incorporating local religious beliefs and traditions into the Christian message: "the local ecclesiastic, who weaves the cadences and mythology of orthodox liturgy and cosmology with the exigencies and spirits of the local cosmos, has been well documented in Byzantine and medieval Christian cultures."

Violent martyrdom would have been rare among Irish saints until the Norse invasions of the 8th century. A 7th-century Irish homily describes three kinds of martyrdom: white (bloodless), a separation from all that one loves; blue (or green), the mortification of one's will through fasting and penitential labour; and red (bloody), undergoing physical torture or death. Early Christian theologians such as Basil of Ancyra regarded the forms of martyrdom as external to true virtue. By these criteria, Begnet's description as virgo, non martyr may not be a self-evident rejection of the status of martyrdom for her. The story of how she left behind her former life, carrying with her only the bracelet that marked her service to the cross, suggests a form of "white" martyrdom. The homily's color triad of martyrdom appears with a fragment of a Latin triad on ethical martyrdom requiring "self-control in abundance, generosity in poverty, chastity in youth." The rejection of marriage by the beautiful young Begnet would be categorized as castitas in iuventute, a form of martyrdom acquired by "chastity in youth" and in early Ireland not considered inferior to that brought about through violence.

During the 7th century in Ireland, saints' bodies were sometimes deliberately dismembered and distributed as relics, and this dispersal offers another explanation for the spread of similarly named saints. In 1837, a topographical dictionary recorded mysterious "stone coffins" on Dalkey Island said to contain disarticulated human remains. This practice may again preserve an earlier feature of ancient Celtic religious cosmology, in which the articulated human body corresponds in numerical proportion to the universe, as preserved in myths of ritual dismemberment by sword. In the 19th century, it was speculated that the builders of the stone tombs on Dalkey Island, sometimes called kistvaens, were "Celtic, or Belgic, tribes of a very remote æra."

== Selected bibliography ==
- Crosthwaite, John Clarke. The Book of Obits and Martyrology of the Cathedral Church of the Holy Trinity, Commonly Called Christ Church, Dublin. Dublin: Irish Archaeological Society, 1844, pp. lxv–lxvi online.
- O'Reilly, Joseph P. "Notes on the Orientation and Certain Architectural Details of the Old Churches of Dalkey Town and Dalkey Island." Proceedings of the Royal Irish Academy 24 (1902–1904) 195–226.
- O'Reilly, Patrick J. "The Christian Sepulchral Leacs and Free-Standing Crosses of the Dublin Half-Barony of Rathdown." Journal of the Royal Society of Antiquaries of Ireland 31 (1901), pp. 134–161, especially p. 158ff. online.
