= Kistvaen =

Type of burial chamber

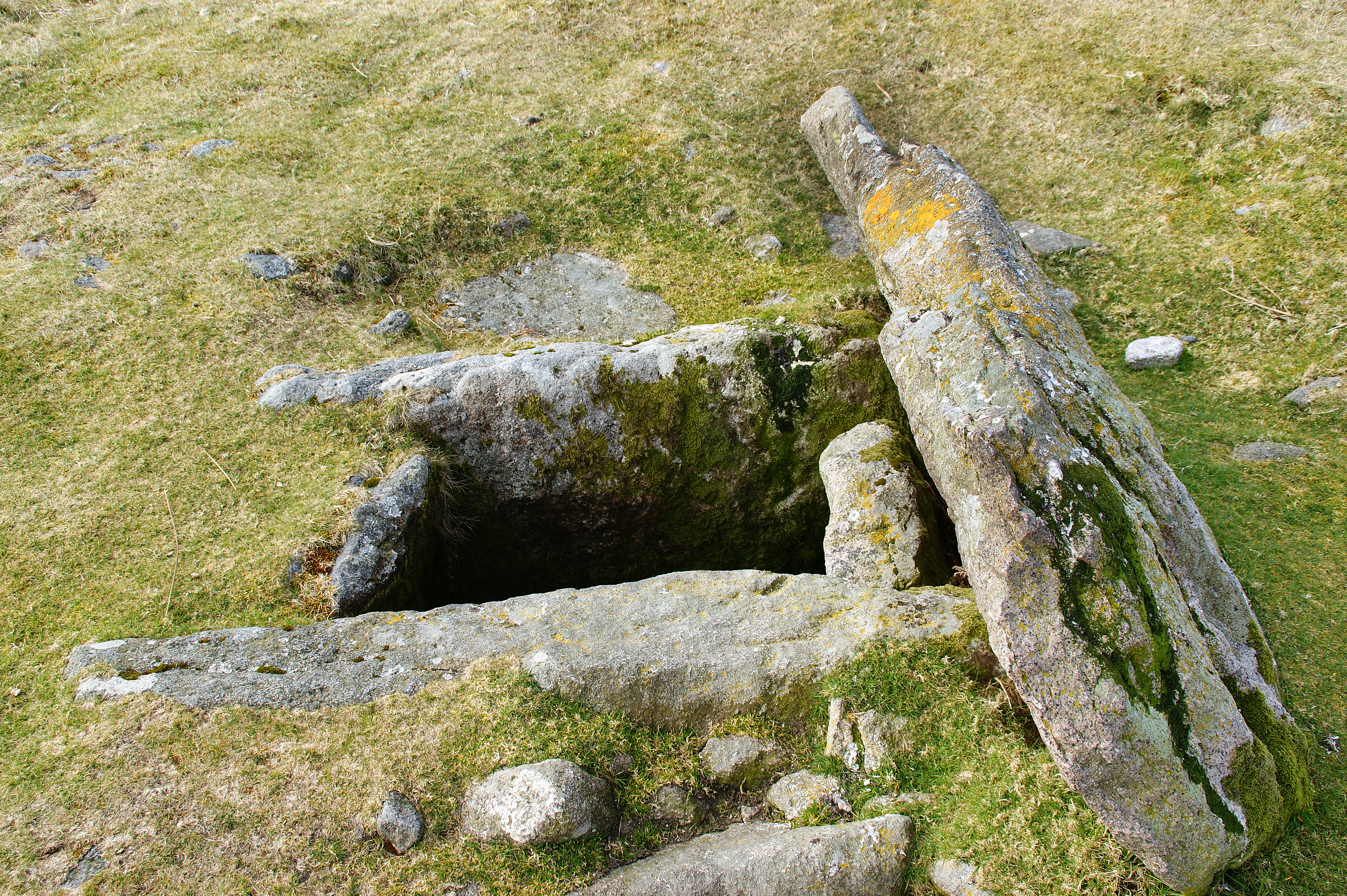
Kistvaen showing capstone and cist structure (Dartmoor in Drizzlecombe)

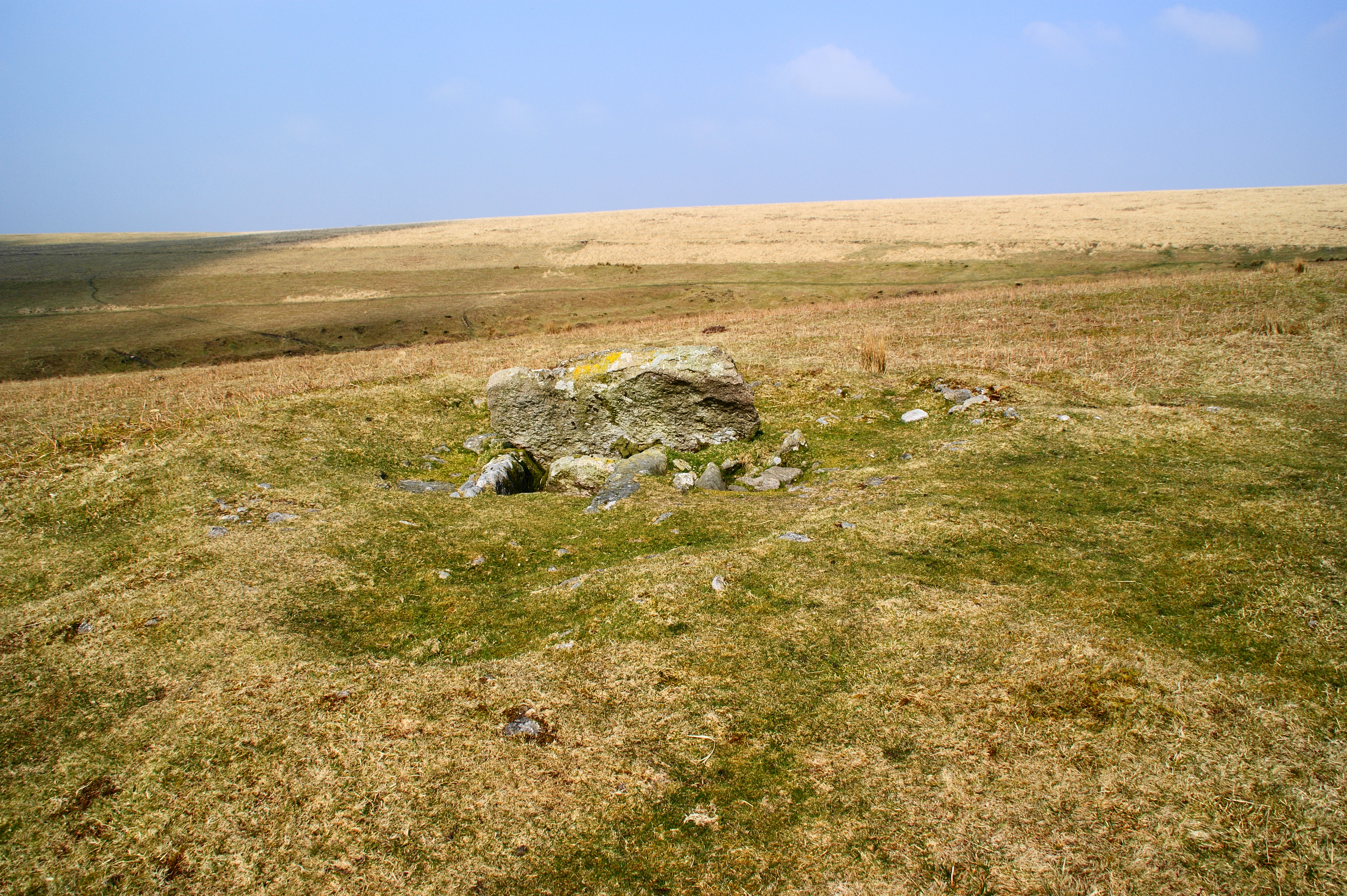
Kistvaen on the southern edge of Dartmoor in Drizzlecombe

A kistvaen or cistvaen is a tomb or burial chamber formed from flat stone slabs in a box-like shape. If set completely underground, it may be covered by a tumulus. The word is derived from the Welsh cist (chest) and maen (stone). The term originated in relation to Celtic structures, typically pre-Christian, but in antiquarian scholarship of the 19th and early 20th centuries it was sometimes applied to similar structures outside the Celtic world.

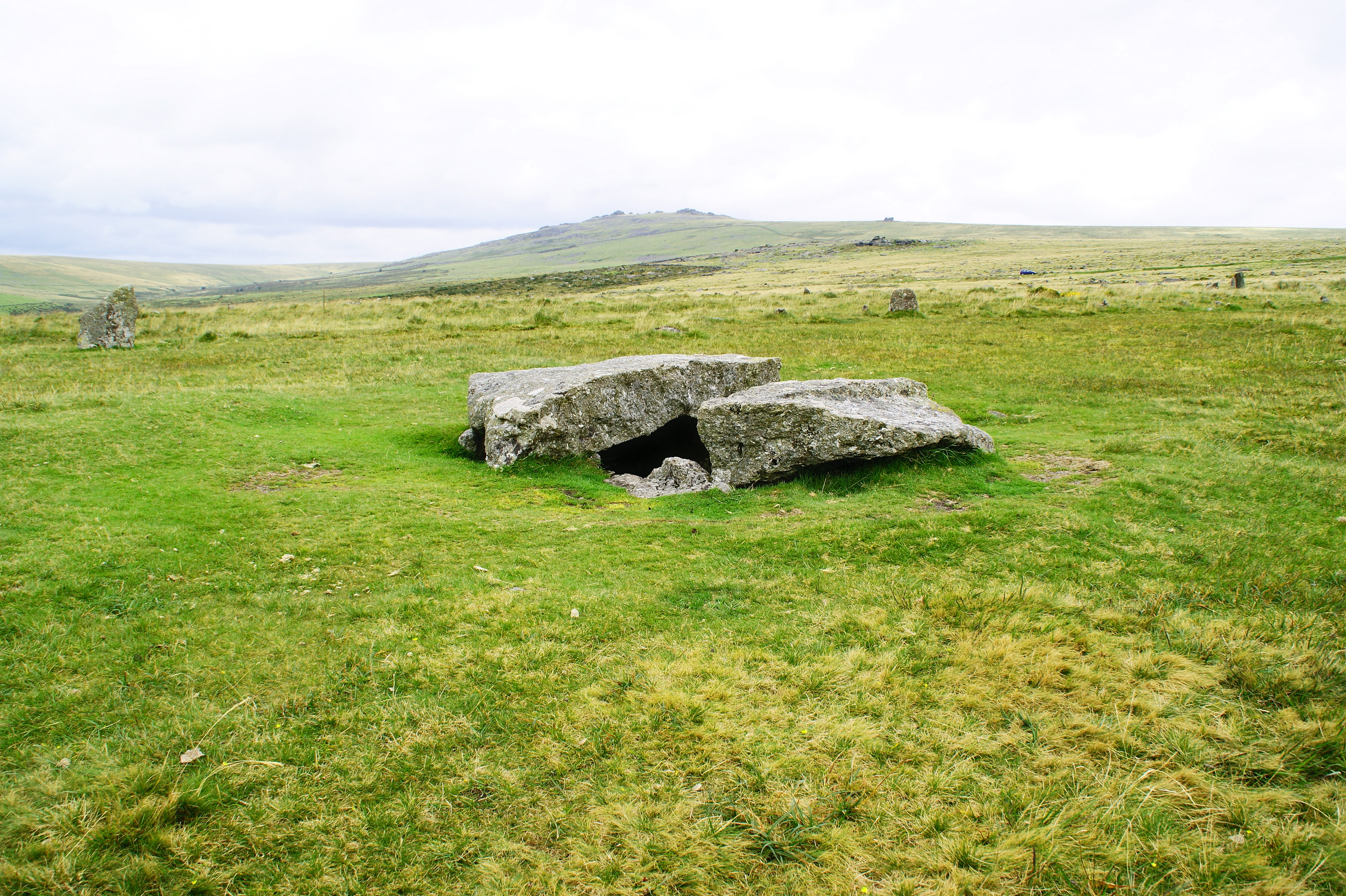
Kistvaen to the south of the stone rows at Merrivale on Dartmoor

One of the most numerous kinds of kistvaen are the Dartmoor kistvaens. These often take the form of small rectangular pits about 3 ft. (0.9 m) long by 2 feet (0.6 m) wide. The kistvaens were usually covered with a mound of earth and surrounded by a circle of small stones. When a body was placed in the kistvaen, it was usually lain in a contracted position. Sometimes however the body was cremated with the ashes placed in a cinerary urn.

== Kistvaens and Celtic saints ==
Kistvaens are also found associated with holy sites or burial places of early Celtic saints, who are often semi-legendary. Saints associated with kistvaens include Callwen daughter of Brychan, Geraint, Begnet, and Melangell. Foundation remains of stone slab- or gable-shrines, or the cella memoriae of Mediterranean origin, may sometimes have been misunderstood in an earlier era of scholarship as a kistvaen, and the subject is complicated by this "woolly nomenclature."

== See also ==
- Dolmen, a type of above-ground burial chamber
