= Dalkey Island =

Island in Ireland

Dalkey Island (St Begnet's Isle)
Native name: Oileán Dheilginse
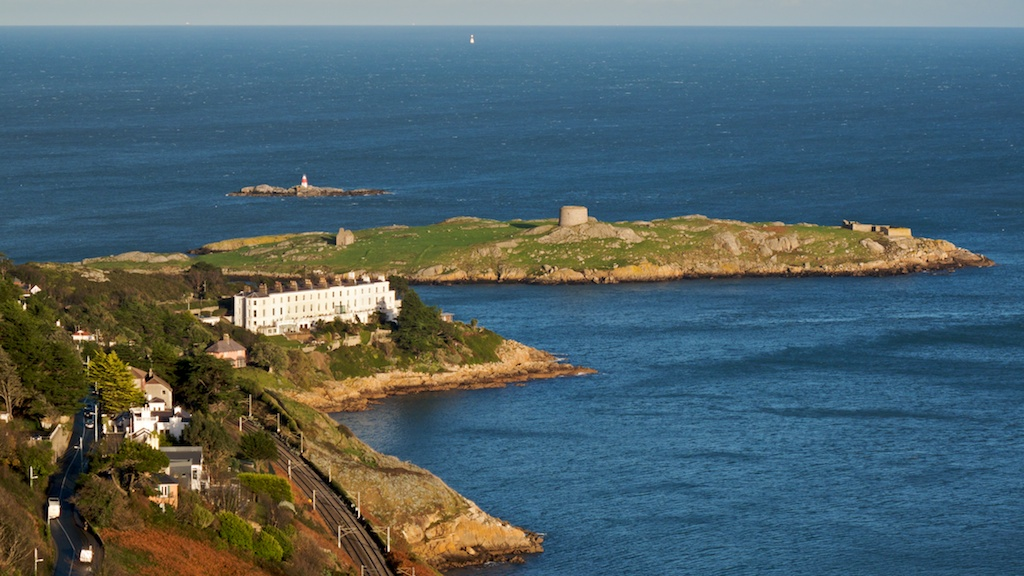
- Dalkey Island viewed from Killiney Hill

- Location within Dublin Location within island of Ireland

Geography
- Location: Irish Sea
- Coordinates: 53°16′19″N 6°05′03″W
- Area: 0.09 km^{2} (0.035 sq mi)

Administration
- Ireland
- Province: Leinster
- County: Dublin

Demographics
- Population: 0 (2011)

Dalkey Island (/ˈdɔːki/ DAW-kee) (Irish: Oileán Dheilginse) is an island for which the nearby village of Dalkey is named (Irish: Oileán Dheilginse meaning "thorn island", with ey the Old Norse (Viking) version of "island"). It is an uninhabited island located in the county of Dún Laoghaire-Rathdown, about 16 kilometres (8 1/2 nautical miles) south of Dublin and 3 km (1 1/2 nmi) south of Dún Laoghaire harbour. An important site of pilgrimage for centuries, it has been known as "St Begnet's Isle" since records began. The earliest reference to "Dalkey Island" is from c. 1782. The island had a population of eight in 1841.

== Location, situation and access ==
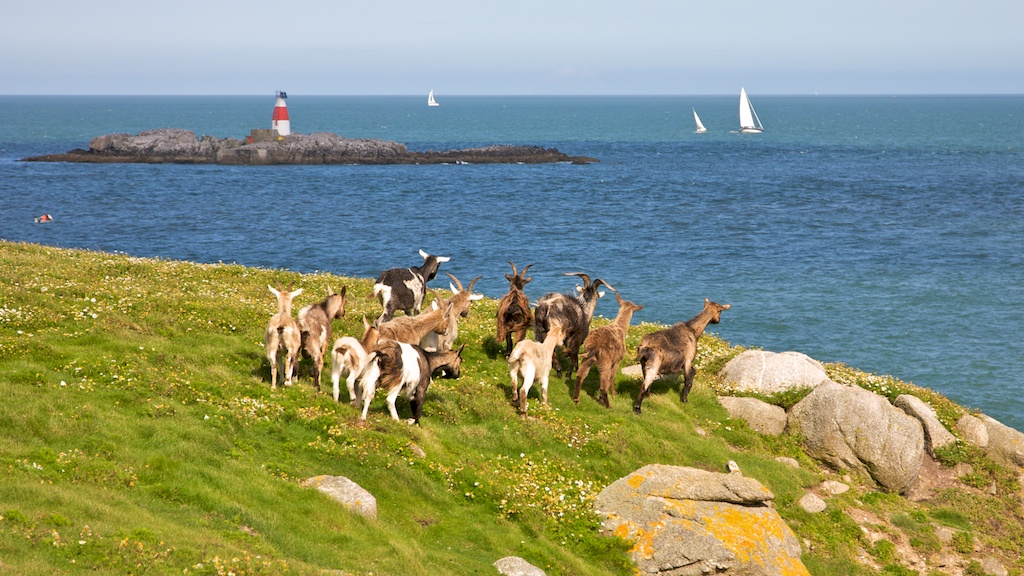
Wild goats at Dalkey Island

The 25-acre island is currently uninhabited but there is evidence of human occupation dating back to the Neolithic period.

The remains of field systems, a church dedicated to Saint Benedict, a cairn burial, a gun battery which had three 24 pound guns and the Martello tower still exist.

There are two holy wells, one on the western shoreline is known locally as the "Scurvy Well" and is located within a surrounding stone structure. The well near the church was claimed in the 19th century to be efficacious in treating ophthalmic complaints.

There is also a bullaun stone formed from an earthbound boulder. This may have been used as a pagan altar as it was 'Christianised' in the 7th century by carving an early Christian cross on the face. This lies close to the remains of the church.

At the northern extremity of the Island there is evidence of a deep ditch or fosse that was the boundary of a medieval promontory fort. Located less than 300 metres off the mainland, the island comprises 9 hectares (22 acres). From Bulloch Harbour, it is possible to visit the island. Also a regular ferry operates from Coliemore Harbour Irish: Caladh Mor meaning 'Big Harbour', during the summer months.

== History ==
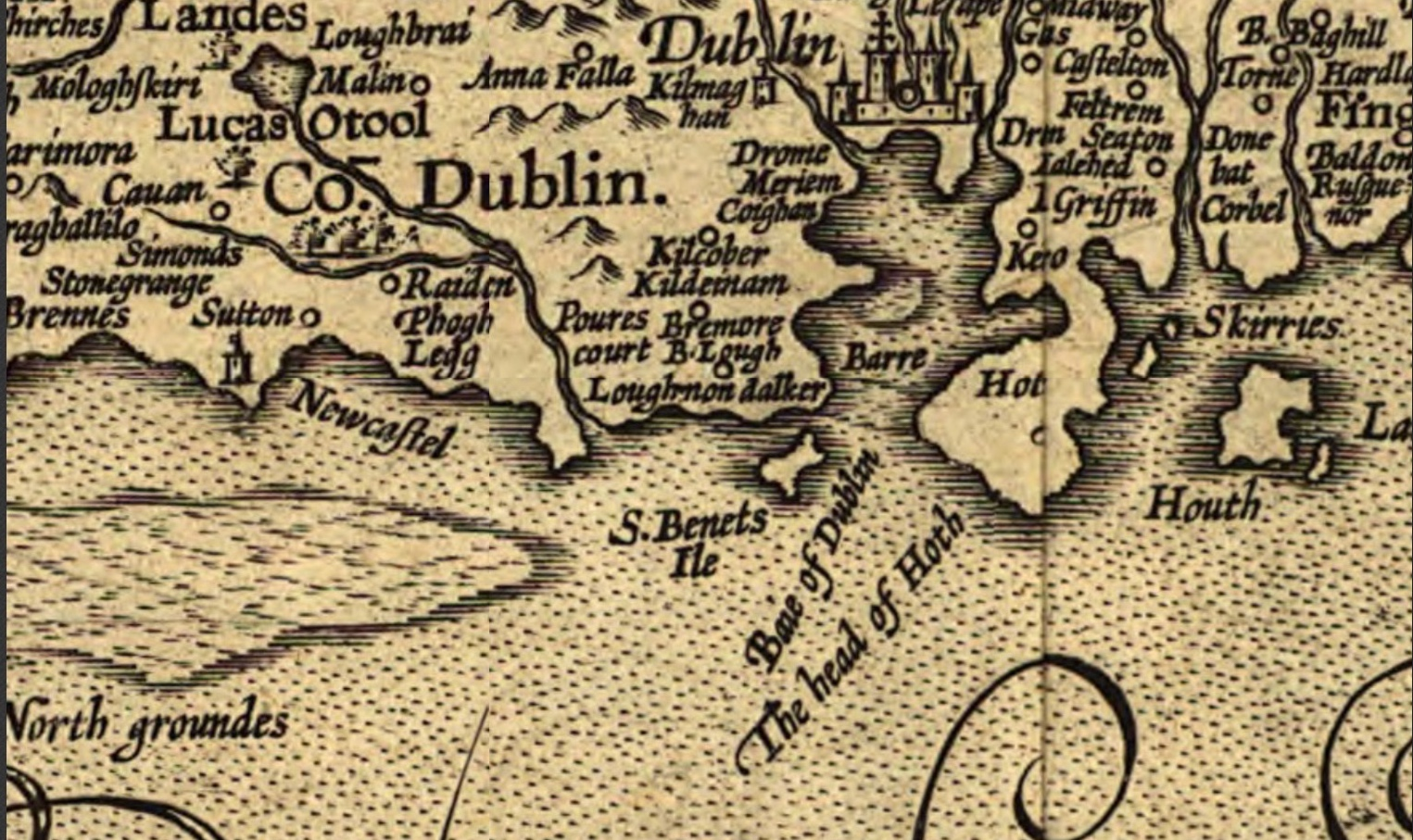
A 1606 map showing the island. Baptista Boazio

Dalkey Island, only 5 minutes by boat from Coliemore Harbour, is an important site of ancient and historic remains. Artefacts from the island, now housed in the National Museum in Dublin, provide evidence that the island's original occupants were from the Mesolithic, or Middle Stone Age. Humans continued to use the site through the Neolithic, Iron Age and Early Christian period.

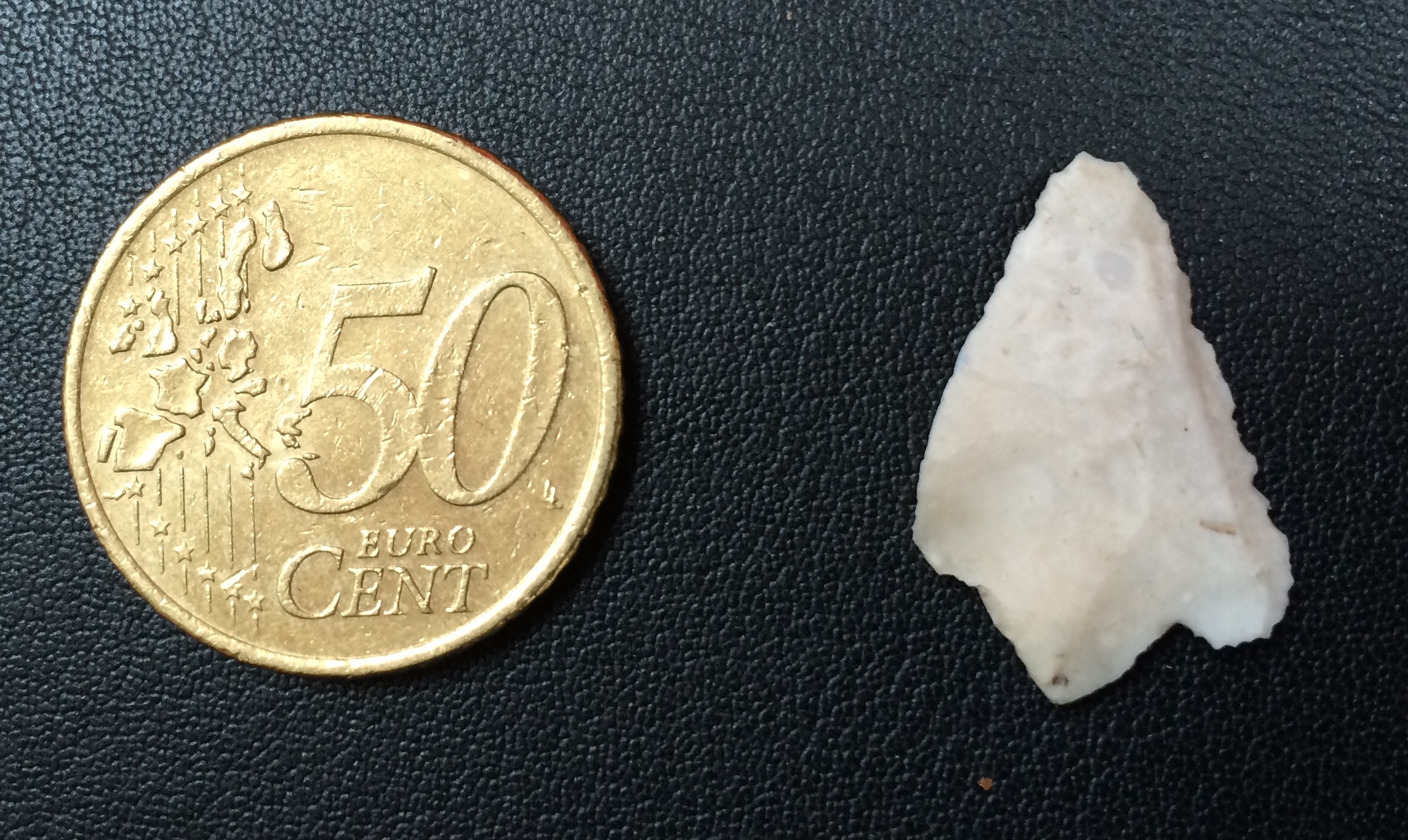
Arrowhead found Dalkey island 2012

There is evidence it was inhabited in the 4th millennium BC (6,000 years ago) and was also used as a Viking base. A number of early medieval pieces of pottery and glassware were found on the island. Some of these artefacts came from the Mediterranean area, possibly Turkey or Greece. It was an important site of pilgrimage in the medieval period as evidenced by the prominence of the island on early maps. One such, Danti's map of "Isole Britaniche", painted on the wall of the Palazzo Vecchio in Florence (c. 1560) survives as a remarkable record. It was believed that "taking" water from the well attributed to the saint could cure scurvy. Recent tests of the water show that it has high levels of vitamin C (the cure for scurvy), probably due to its position below a salt marsh. There are ruins of a church, dating to the 7th century, which is named for St Begnet. An older wooden church was probably here before the present stone one was built. Another church in nearby Dalkey also named for St Begnet may have been a 'base' for pilgrims before they crossed the sound to the island. 'Pilgrim badges' would have been sold in the town which would be eventually sewn into their burial shroud to prove that they had undertaken the pilgrimage, helping their journey through the gates of heaven. On the orders of Henry VIII as part of his dissolution of the monasteries, St Begnet's was raided in 1539. The ornaments and plate raised 36 shillings for the crown.

In the early Christian period, the town of Dalkey was called Kilbegnet. The earliest reference to 'Dalkey Island' is to be found on a map printed for 'Barnard's New, Complete and Authentic History of England’ printed c1782'. This was about the time that the island was becoming a site of British military ordinance. There is also a reference to it on a copy of the Downs survey of about the same time. The church on the island was altered during this period on the east side, when builders used it as living quarters while building the nearby Martello tower and gun battery in 1804.

Extensive archaeological excavations took place in the late 1960s (Liversage) which uncovered evidence of a churchyard and a number of burials. The skeletons were not exclusively male, as has been suggested but they were in the majority in keeping with the fact that it was an early Christian Monastic site.

A promontory fort designed to help protect what was the main deep water port for Dublin, now called Coliemore Harbour Irish: Caladh Mor meaning 'Big Harbour', in the medieval period was located at the northern end of the island, its presence still visible today in the form of a ditch. The remains of a child (probably a plague victim) were discovered, discarded rather than buried in the ditch during the 1968 excavation. The remains may also have been that of a young Viking slave (comparisons to the remains found in Llanbedrgoch on Anglesey would suggest this) but accurate dating tests have not yet been carried out.

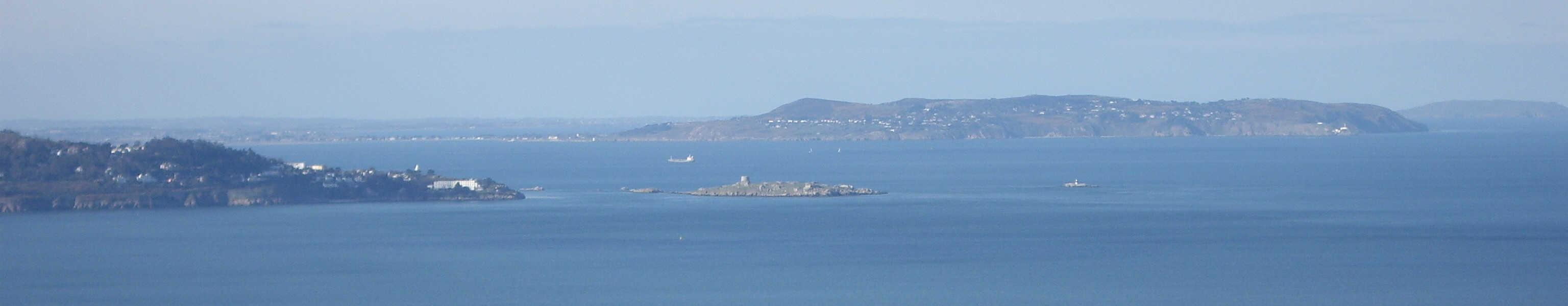
Dalkey Island, with Sorrento Point to the left, The Muglins to the right. Howth peninsula is in the background

The ruined stone church may be as old as the 7th century and was probably abandoned for a period when the Vikings used the island as a base and there is evidence that the island was used as a slave market during this period. The Annals of the Four Masters says that in 938. Coibhdeanagh, the Abbot of Cill-achaidh, drowned in the sea off the island trying to escape with treasures from the church hidden in his vestments during one Viking raid. In the early 19th century the Admiralty erected the Martello Tower, one of eight dotted along the Dún Laoghaire coastline, as an early warning defensive device against the one-time threat of invasion during the Napoleonic Wars. A herd of goats, originally put on the island in the early 19th century, remains there today but they are replacements for the original goats who were removed.

According to Samuel Lewis's 1837 Topographical Dictionary of Ireland, "[t]radition states" that Dalkey was used as a place of refuge for some citizens of Dublin during the "great plague" of 1775.

=== "King" of Dalkey ===
Prior to 1798, it was the custom annually to elect, in the month of June, the King of Dalkey (and emperor of the Muglins) along with various officers of state whose proceedings were recorded in a newspaper called the Dalkey Gazette.

== Waters and leisure ==
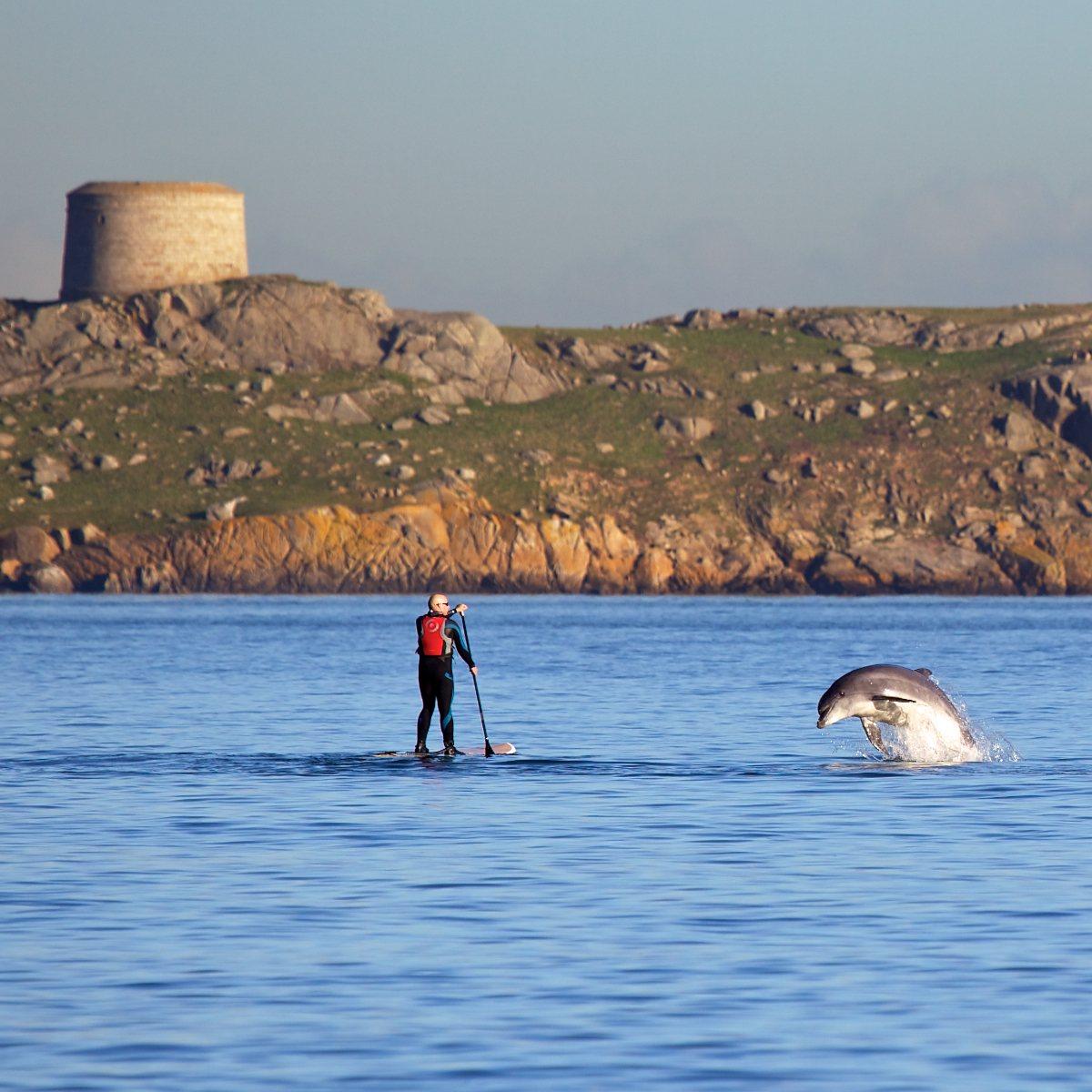
Bottlenose dolphin playing with a paddle boarder in front of Dalkey Island

The island is also an ideal spot for fishing, with pollock, coalfish, wrasse and mackerel being caught.

The channel between the island and the mainland is approximately 1,100 metres (1,200 yards) long and 300 metres (330 yards) wide and known as Dalkey Sound which has a rocky floor and a strong tide flows through it.

The waters around Dalkey Island are much used for sailing, angling and diving. Rocks known as Maiden or Carraig Rock, Clare Rock and Lamb Island, all to the northwest, form part of the ridge of the Island. Parts of these rocks are only visible at low tide. The southern end of the island is a favourite with kayakers, especially on the flooding tide. There can be a substantial overfall here and in a southeast wind can be extremely challenging for the kayaker. When kayaking around the Island on a flood tide it is easier to go in an anti-clockwise direction.

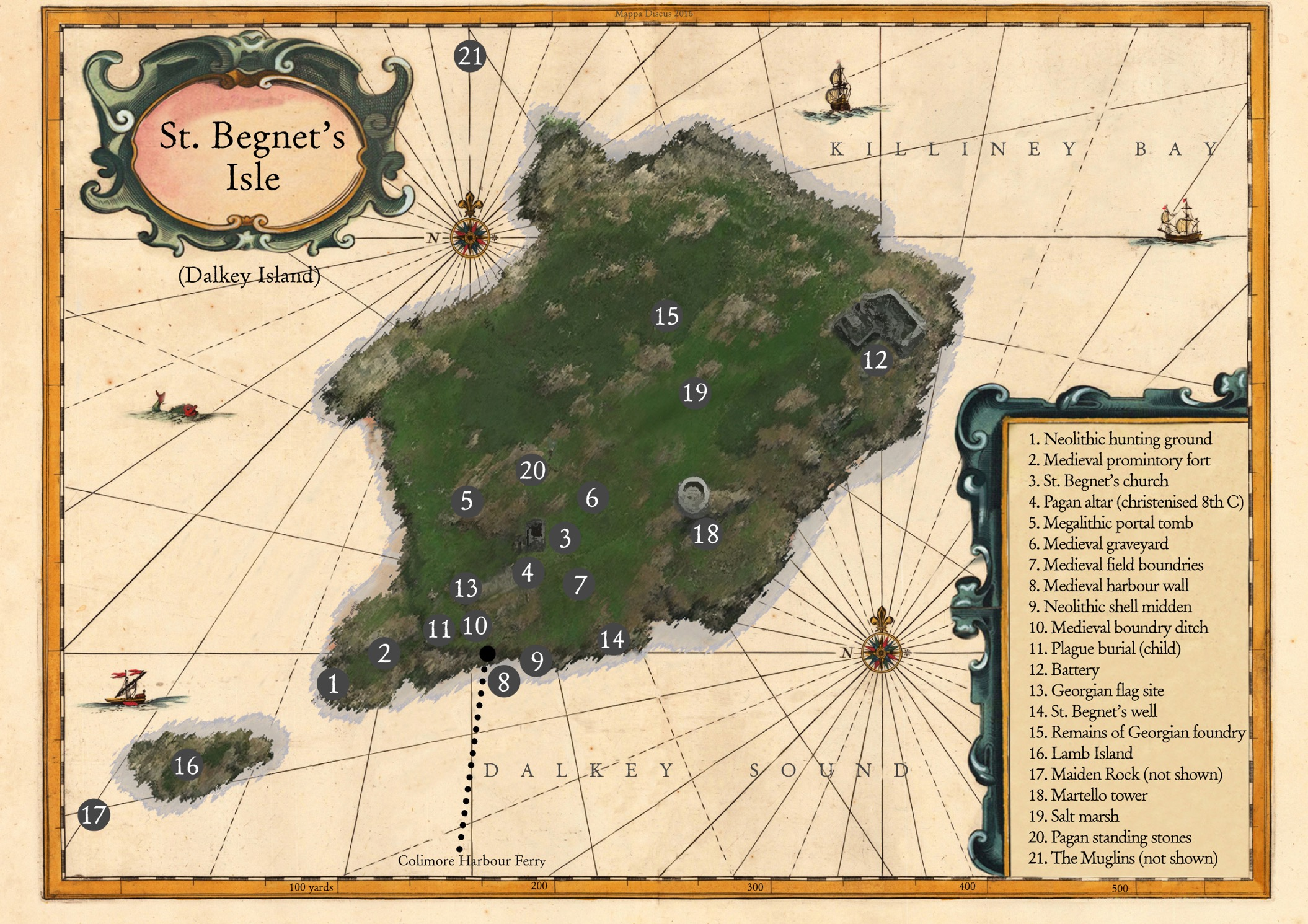
Map of Dalkey island (St Begnet's Isle)

== Wildlife ==
Dalkey Island is home to a colony of seals which has greatly expanded in recent years. Rabbits and a herd of wild goats live on the island also. Birdwatch Ireland have established a colony of Roseate Terns on Maiden Rock just north of the Island and Ireland holds most of the European population.

== The Muglins ==
The rocks to the east of the island are known as "The Muglins" and are a different group or chain. These form a danger to shipping and have been fitted with a distinctive beacon. The beacon stands on the site of what was once a "gibbet" where the bodies of two pirates, Peter McKinlie and George Gidley were displayed following their execution for the murders of Captain Cockeran, Captain George Glas and his family and others on board the ship Earl of Sandwich in 1765. Their remains lie buried under the concrete plinth base of the beacon.

== Other projects ==
Media related to Dalkey Island at Wikimedia Commons
