= Carlatton =

Civil parish in Cumbria, England

Coordinates: 54.8651°N 2.741525°W

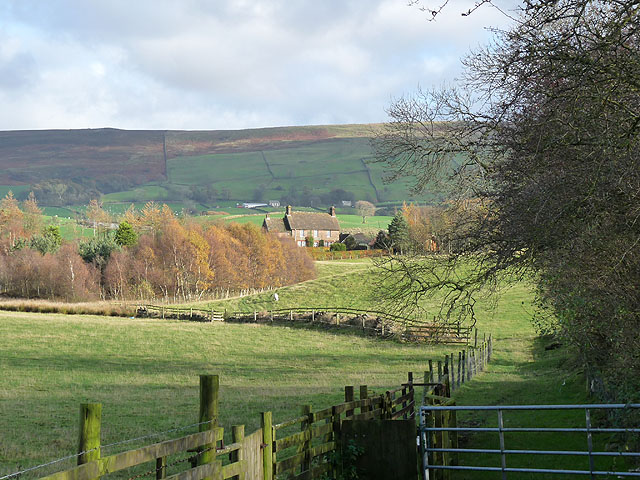
- Countryside around Black Dub Farm

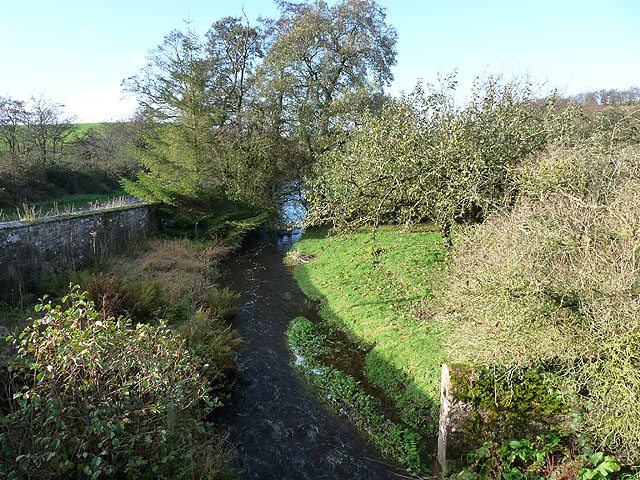
- Cairn Beck at Carlatton Mill

- Location within Cumbria
- Population: 48 (Parish, 2021)
- Civil parish: Carlatton
- Unitary authority: Cumberland
- Ceremonial county: Cumbria
- Region: North West
- Country: England
- Sovereign state: United Kingdom
- Post town: BRAMPTON
- Postcode district: CA8
- Police: Cumbria
- Fire: Cumbria
- Ambulance: North West
- UK Parliament: Carlisle

Carlatton is a civil parish in the Cumberland district of Cumbria, England. It lies north-west of Cumrew, with which it shares a parish council, 5 miles (8 km) south of Brampton, and 8 miles (13 km) south-east of Carlisle. In 2021 the parish had a population of 48.

== History ==
Carlatton was an ancient parish in the historic county of Cumberland. It had a church as late as the 14th century, which stood near Carlatton Mill on the Cairn Beck. No trace of the church now remains, and Carlatton came to be considered an extra-parochial township.

In 1858, such extra-parochial townships were converted into civil parishes. From 1894 until 1934 the parish formed part of Brampton Rural District, and between 1934 and 1974 it was part of Border Rural District. In 1974 it became part of the district of Carlisle when the new county of Cumbria was formed. In 2023 it became part of the new Cumberland district which took over the functions of the county and district councils.

== Governance ==
There are two tiers of local government covering Carlatton, at parish and unitary authority level: Carlatton and Cumrew Parish Council, and Cumberland Council. The parish council is a grouped parish council, also covering the neighbouring parish of Cumrew. For national elections, Carlatton is within the Carlisle constituency.
