= Merrivale, Devon =

Village in Devon, England

Coordinates: 50.5583°N 4.0509°W

Merrivale
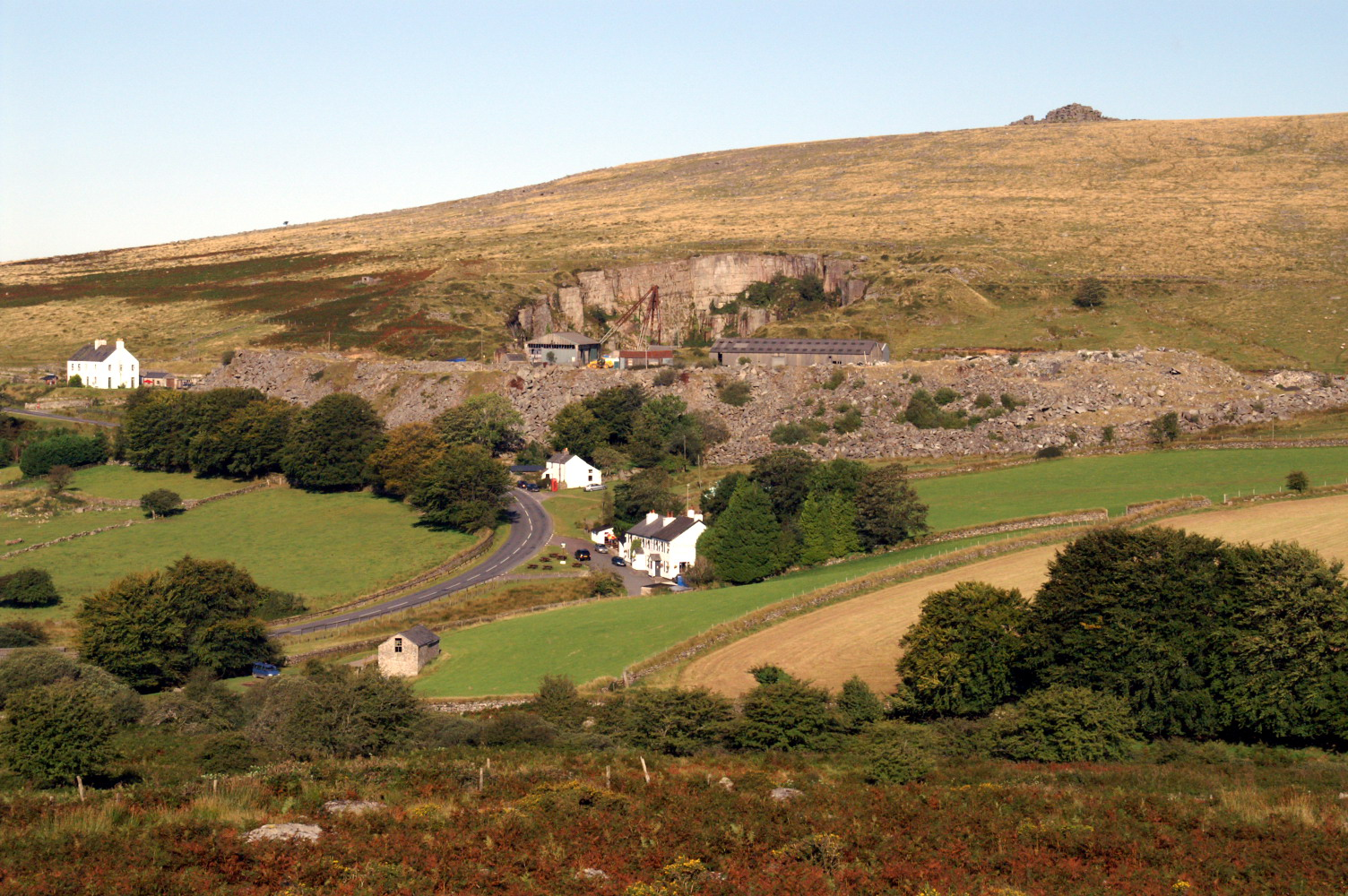
- Merrivale hamlet and quarry with Staple Tor beyond.

- Location within Devon
- OS grid reference: SX547752
- Civil parish: Whitchurch
- District: West Devon
- Shire county: Devon
- Region: South West
- Country: England
- Sovereign state: United Kingdom
- Post town: YELVERTON
- Postcode district: PL20
- Dialling code: 01822
- Police: Devon and Cornwall
- Fire: Devon and Somerset
- Ambulance: South Western
- UK Parliament: Torridge and West Devon

Merrivale (formerly also Merivale) is a locality in western Dartmoor, in the West Devon district of Devon, England. It is best known for the nearby series of Bronze Age megalithic monuments to the south and a former granite quarry.

== Merrivale hamlet ==
The hamlet, which lies within the civil parish of Whitchurch, is situated at the crossing of the River Walkham on the B3357 (formerly the main Ashburton to Tavistock road), midway between the towns of Princetown and Tavistock. There is an older disused bridge to the north of the modern road. The hamlet is dominated by the spoil tip from the former Merrivale granite quarry (originally known as Tor Quarries), which closed in 1997. The few buildings include houses built originally for quarry workers and the Dartmoor Inn, which sells Merrivale Ale. There was once also a Wesleyan chapel.

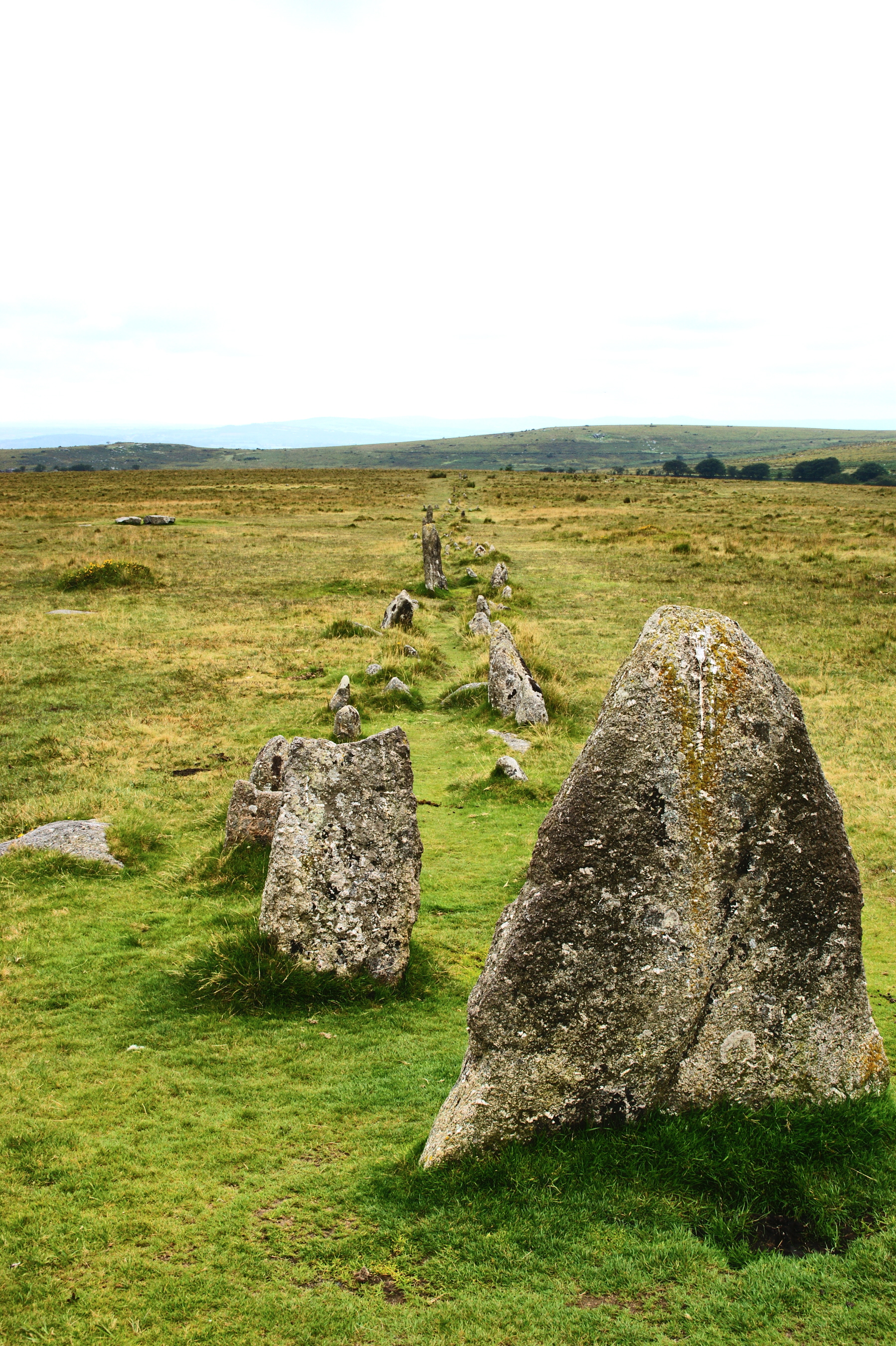
Merrivale stone rows

== Archaeology ==
The main area of archaeological interest is to the south-east of the hamlet at grid reference SX556746. Although it has been diminished over time, the site includes a 3.8m standing stone, a stone circle and a stone row.

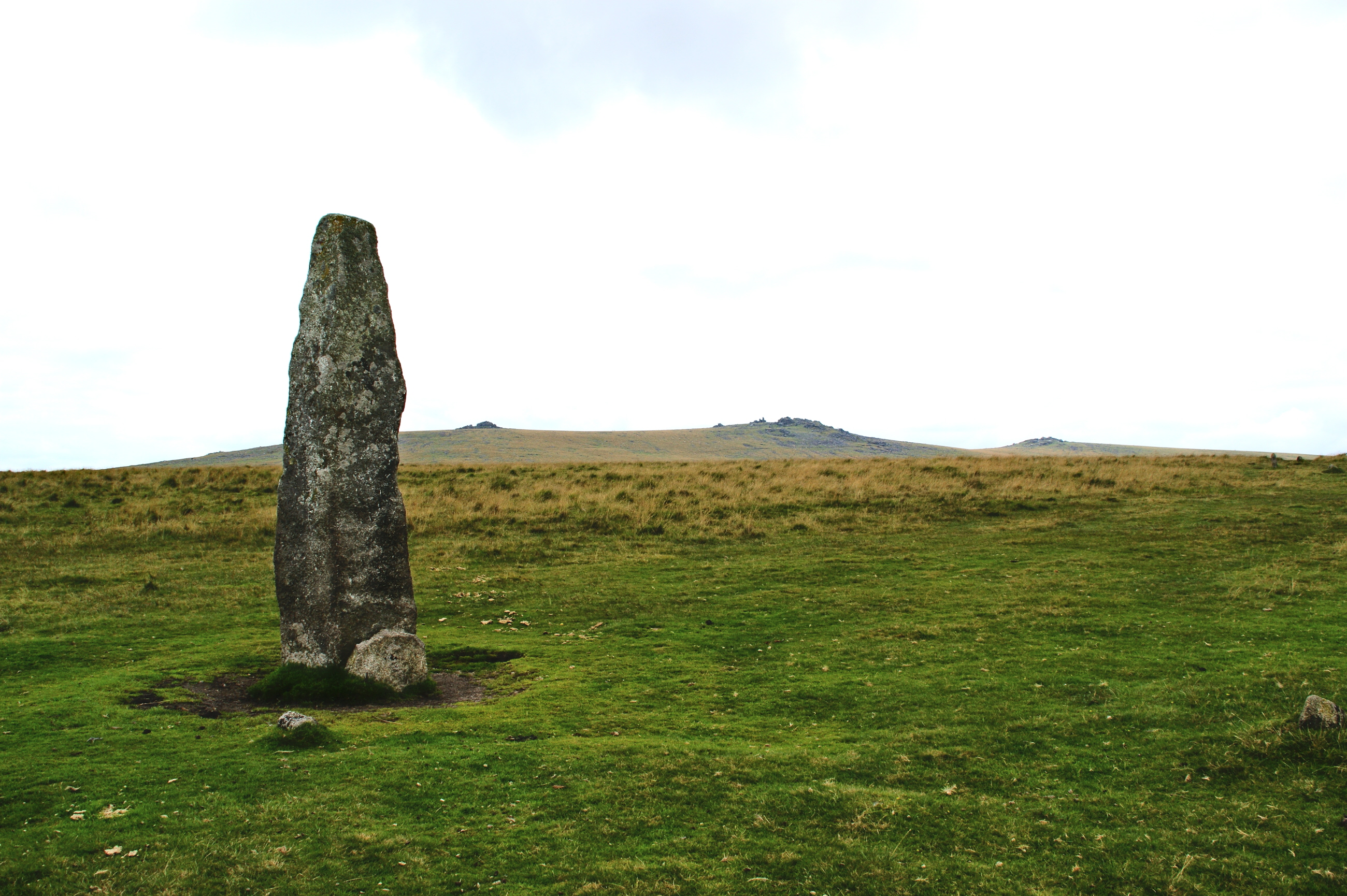
Menhir (Standing stone) at Merrivale

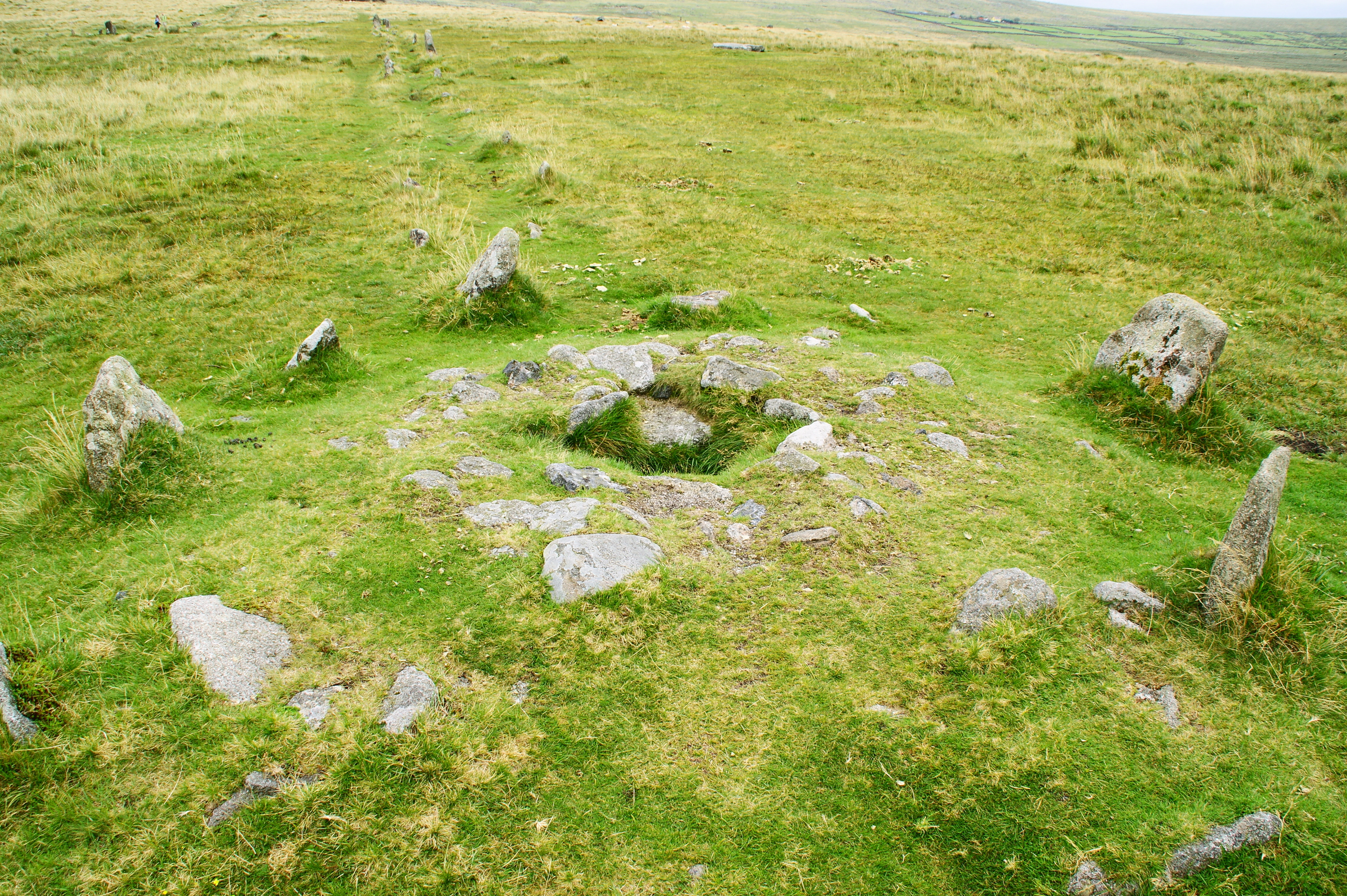
Kistvaen within the Merrivale stone rows

Also visible are two stone avenues running parallel to each other on either side of a stream. The southern avenue is 263.5 metres long and has the remains of a barrow in the middle. The northern avenue is slightly shorter. Both avenues are only about 1 metre wide down the centre. The southernmost double row has a kistvaen set within the stone row. The eastern end of the rows is passed by a section of the Great Western Reave, running roughly NW-SE.

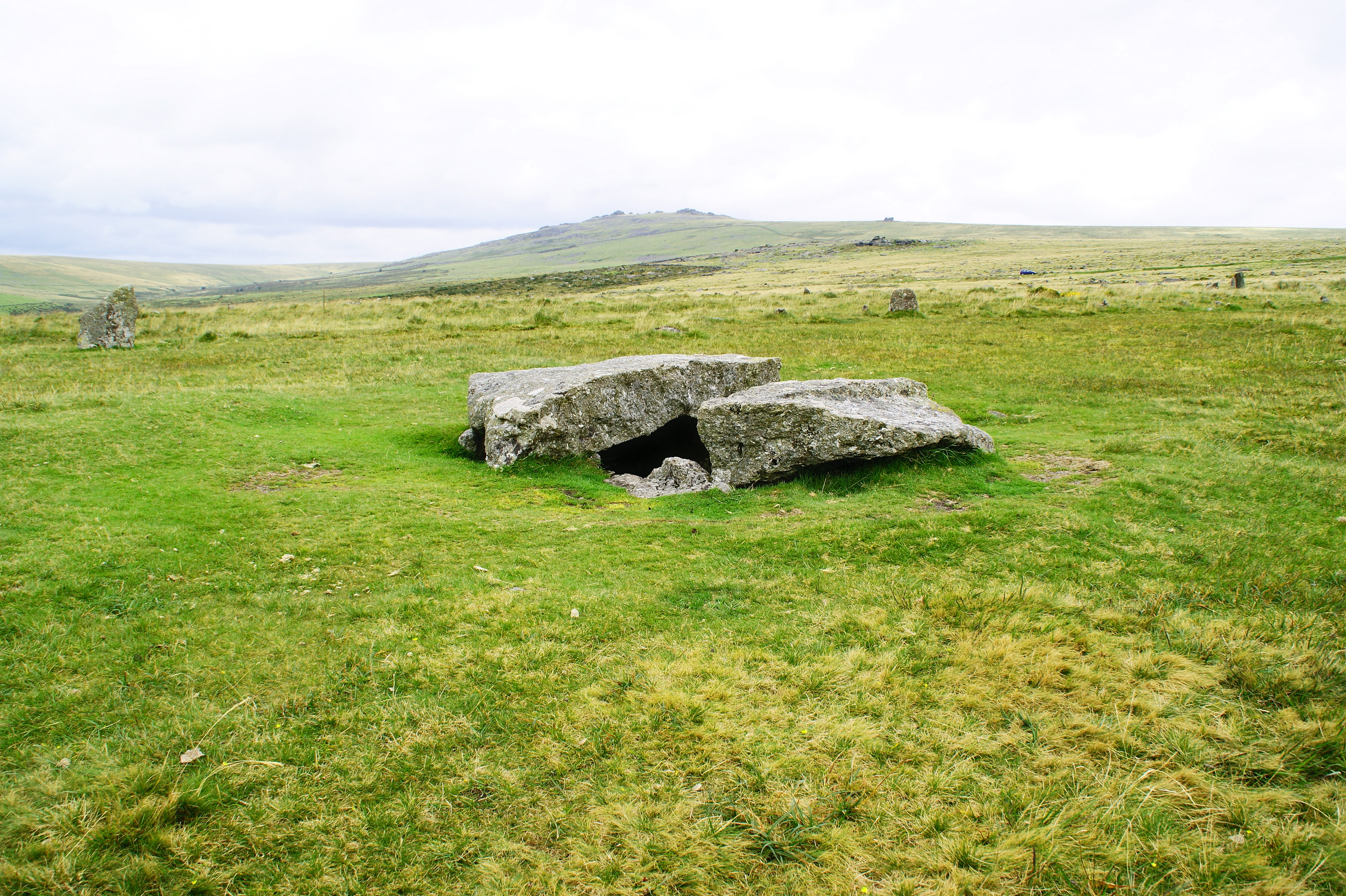
Cist (Kist) to the south of the rows

To the south of the avenues is a large kistvaen which contained a flint scraper, a number of flint flakes and a whetstone for polishing metal items. The 'lid' of the cist was broken in two by a farmer sometime in the past who made a gatepost out of it. Numerous tors are visible from the site, including King's Tor and Staple Tor.

The stone row was formerly known in the area as the Potato Market or Plague Market, supposedly since provisions for Tavistock were left here during an outbreak of plague. William Crossing remarked on how insignificant the stones appear, given the size of some of the raw materials available.

More recent archaeology includes the remains of tin mining and smelting along the River Walkham and its side streams.

== Geology and geomorphology ==
Merrivale straddles the western edge of the Dartmoor granite outcrop. The hamlet, quarry and Staple Tors to the north are on the granite, while Cox Tor immediately to the west is on the metamorphic aureole, with altered Carboniferous sedimentary rocks of the Culm Measures lower down and calc-silicate hornfels and intrusive dolerite at the summit. The Merrivale Granite is coarse grained, porphyritic, with crystals that are dark grey, white/cream and orange in colour.

The Merrivale Site of Special Scientific Interest (SSSI) to the north of the hamlet was the 4000th SSSI declared in England, in 1997. Besides the quarry it includes Cox Tor, Roos Tor and Staple Tors. It has a range of periglacial landscape features, including blockfields, boulder runs and boulder stripes, formed under tundra conditions (arctic to sub-arctic climate) during the Pleistocene. It is important in understanding how the landscape of South West England and the granite tors of Devon and Cornwall were formed. All of the land designated as the Merrivale SSSI is owned by the Duchy of Cornwall.

== See also ==
- Henry Duke, 1st Baron Merrivale
- Mining in Cornwall and Devon
- Portcullis House, 2001, last major contract for Merrivale granite
