= Drizzlecombe =

Area in Dartmoor of archaeological significance

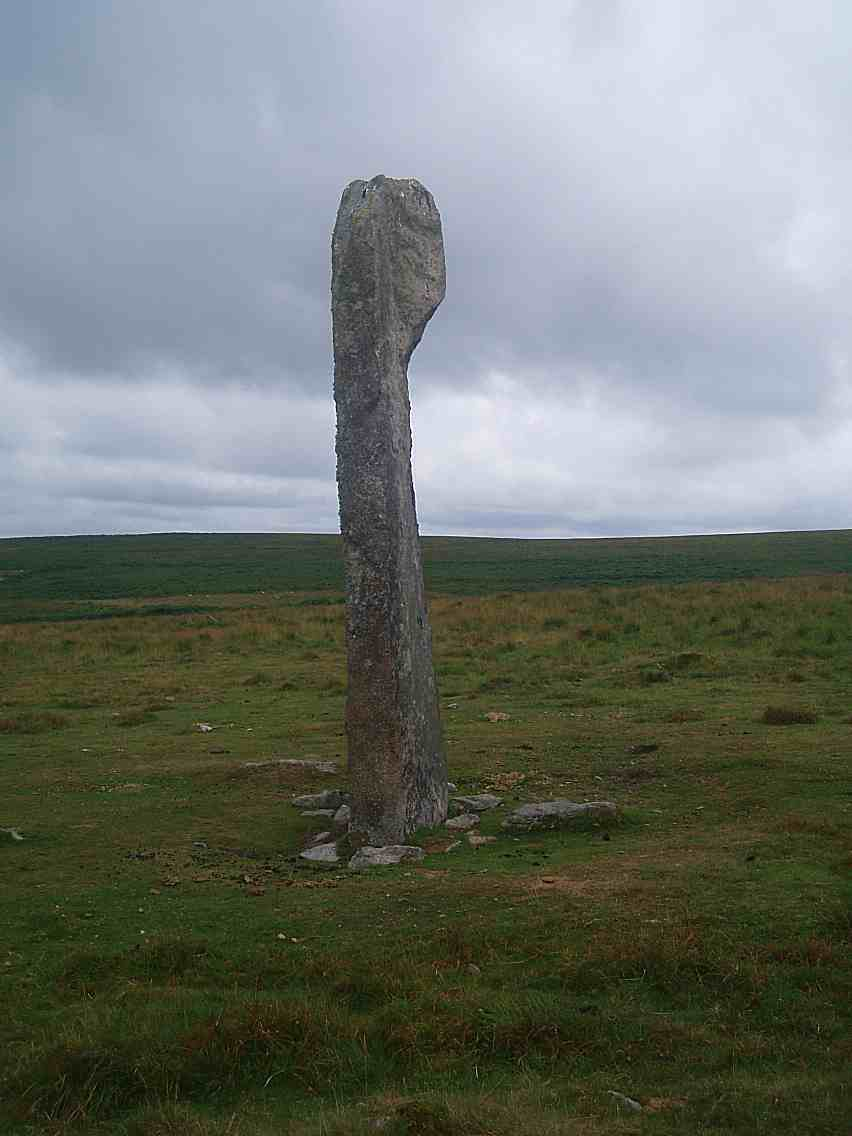
- Main standing stone

- Location within Devon
- 50.486°N 3.985°W
- Type: Stone rows, menhirs, cairns, kistvaens
- Periods: Neolithic, Bronze Age
- Location: Dartmoor
- Region: England

Site notes
- Public access: Yes

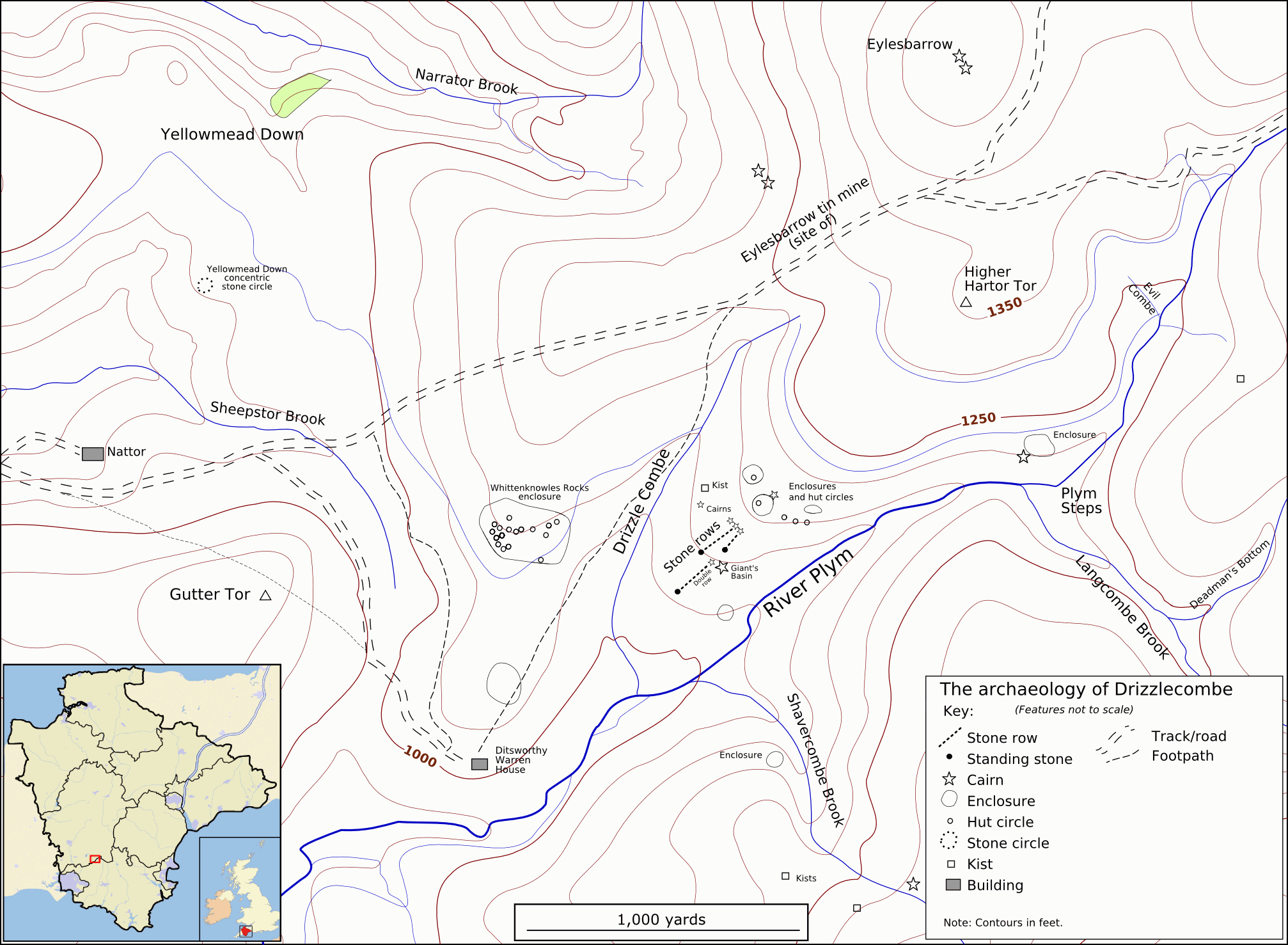
The archaeology of Drizzlecombe
Click to see the whole map

Drizzlecombe or Thrushelcombe is an area of Dartmoor in the county of Devon, England, containing a number of Bronze Age stone rows, cairns and menhirs.

There are three principal stone rows each with an associated barrow and terminal menhir. Most of the artifacts are on the southwest slope of Hartor Hill. The tallest menhir, which at 14 ft (4.3 m) high is the largest on Dartmoor, was re-erected by Sabine Baring-Gould, R. Hansford Worth and others in 1893.

Drizzlecombe is located on the western side of Dartmoor, about 4 miles (6.4 km) east of the village of Yelverton, to the west of the upper reaches of the River Plym.

Nearby is the large but damaged cairn known as Giant's Basin; many of its stones were removed by warreners to build their rabbit-warrens at Ditsworthy, lower down the river. Higher up the slope and overlooking these monuments is a village of stone hut circles, akin to the one at Grimspound. To the north-east lie the extensive remains of Eylesbarrow tin mine and north-west is the concentric Yellowmead stone circle. The area also includes the Neolithic Dartmoor kistvaens, or tombs.

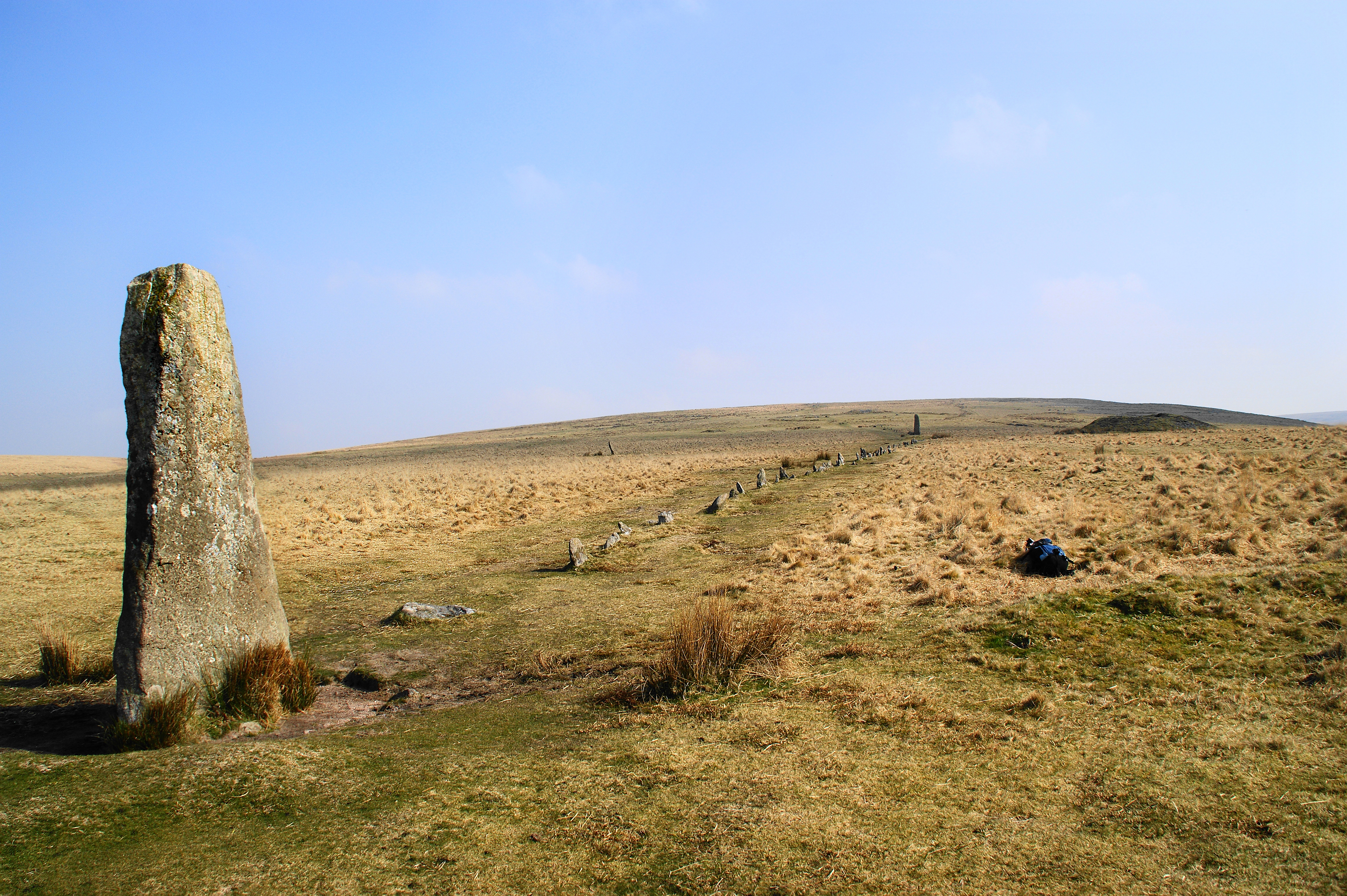
General view towards the northeast, including Giant's Basin.
