= Manor of Flete =

Historic manor in Devon, England

Flete (anciently Flete Damarell) in the parish of Holbeton in Devon is an historic manor. In 1810 it was called "one of the finest estates in the county of Devon". The present manor house known as Flete House was built in the 19th century incorporating some elements of an earlier Tudor house on the site.

== Descent ==
=== Brictwold ===
Before the Norman Conquest of 1066 it was held by the Anglo-Saxon Brictwold.

=== d'Aumale ===
The Domesday Book of 1086 lists FLUTES as the 11th of the 17 Devonshire holdings of Robert of Aumale (fl. 1086), one of the Devon Domesday Book tenants-in-chief of King William the Conqueror, who held it in demesne. He was also known as d'Amarell, Damarell, etc., and his name was Latinised to de Albemarle, de Albamara, etc. Thus the manor became known as Flete Damarell.

It continued in the Aumale family, called by Risdon, Tristram (died 1640) "A fruitful family in former times", until late in the reign of King Edward III (1327–1377), thus for a period of about 290 years. Thirteen members of the family received the honour of knighthood

=== Holland ===
By 1420 the manor was in the hands of King Henry IV's nephew, John Holland, 2nd Duke of Exeter.

=== Chalons ===
In 1420 the manor was granted to Sir Robert Chalons and his wife and their male heirs. His wife Blanche, daughter of Sir Hugh Waterton, died in 1437 and Sir Robert in 1445. Their son Henry was already dead, so their heir was his son John, who died childless in 1447.

=== Holland ===
The grant to the Chalons family having expired, the manor therefore reverted to the heirs of John Holland, who also died in 1447.

=== Hill ===
Flete descended subsequently to the Hill family. The most prominent family of that name, descended from the judge Sir Robert Hill, a Justice of the Common Pleas in 1392, was seated at Shilston in the parish of Modbury (very close to Flete) from the reign of King Richard II (1377–1399) until the 17th century.

=== Prideaux ===
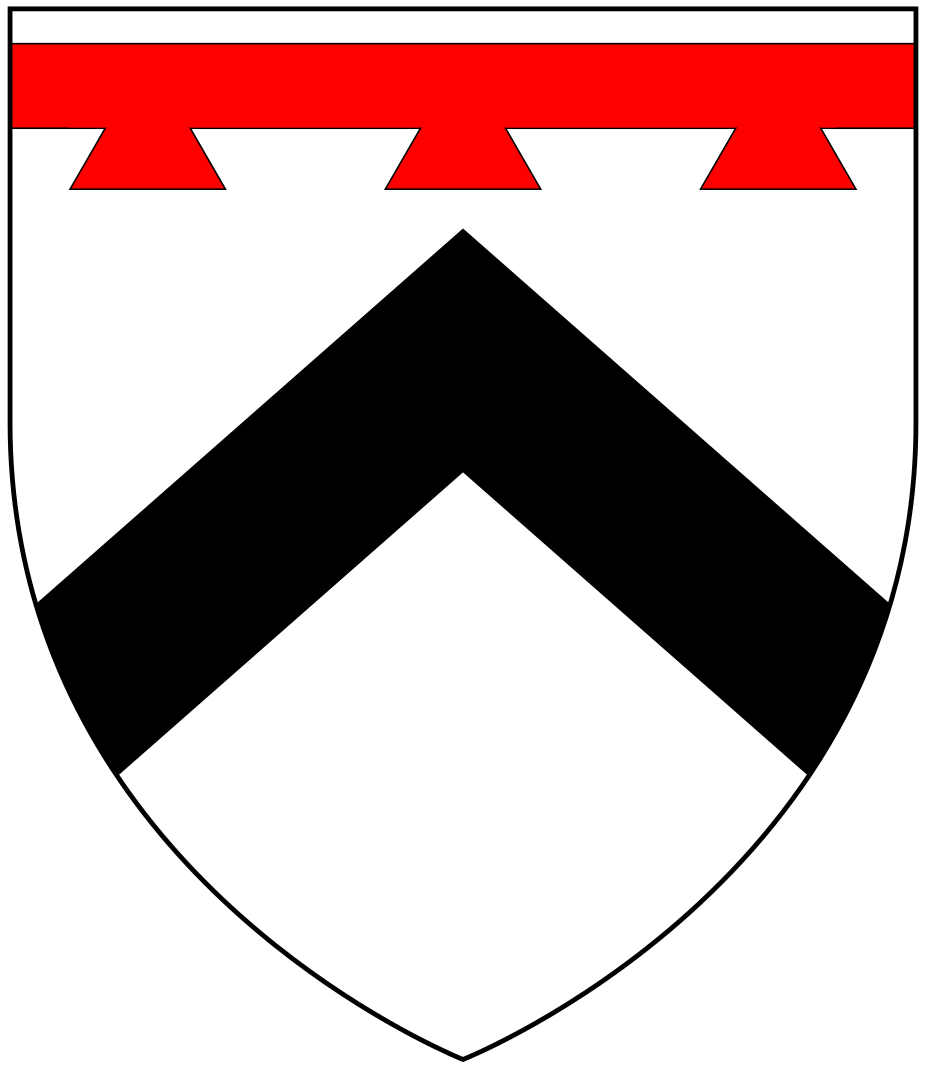
Arms of Prideaux: Argent, a chevron sable in chief a label of three points gules

Flete descended subsequently to the Prideaux family. This prominent and widespread family, founded in the 11th century at Prideaux Castle near Fowey in Cornwall, had a branch seated at Orcharton, about 1 mile from Modbury (2 miles east of Flete), from the 14th century to 1590, when Sir Robert Prideaux sold Orcharton to Sir John Hele (died 1608), a serjeant-at-law, Recorder of Exeter (1592–1605) and a Member of Parliament for Exeter, who also purchased the manors of Yealmpton and Wembury, and whose effigy survives in Wembury Church. Sir John Hele's younger brother, Thomas Hele (died 1613) of Exeter, acquired Flete.

=== Hele ===
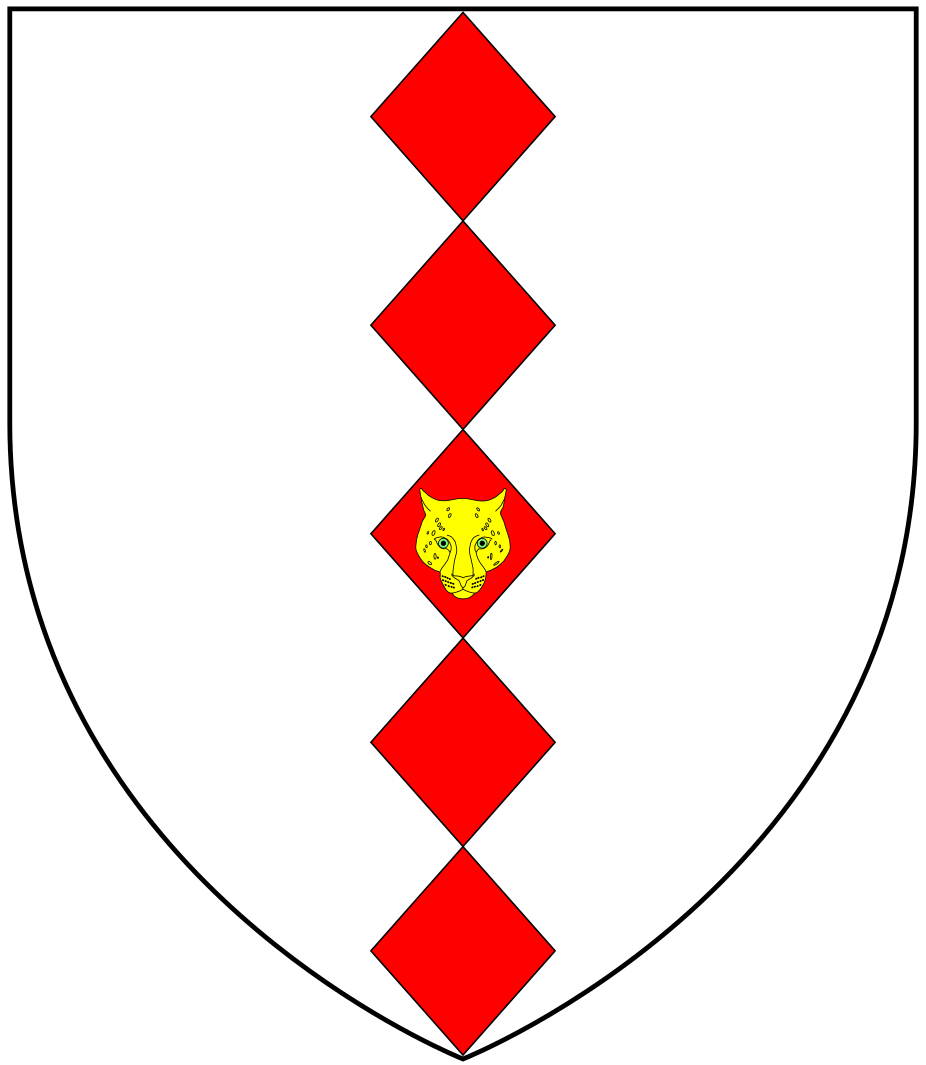
Arms of Hele: Argent, five fusils in pale gules on the middle one a leopard's face or

==== Thomas Hele (died 1613) ====
According to Pole, Flete was a dwelling of Thomas Hele (died 1613) of Exeter, Sheriff of Devon in 1600–1. He was the third son of Nicholas Hele of South Hele by his second wife Margaret Dune, daughter of Richard Dune of Holsworthy in Devon. Thomas Hele's mother survived her husband and remarried to Elizeus Warwick of Holbeton in Devon, in which parish Flete is situated. Thomas Hele married Julian Smith, a daughter of John Smith of Exeter. He had several brothers, the youngest being Sir John Hele (died 1608), a serjeant-at-law, Recorder of Exeter (1592–1605) and a Member of Parliament for Exeter, who purchased several manors including Yealmpton, Wembury, and Orcharton near Modbury, and whose effigy survives in Wembury Church.

==== Thomas Hele (1568–1624) ====
Thomas Hele (died 1613) was succeeded by his eldest son and heir, Thomas Hele (1568–1624) of Flete who married Bridget Champernowne, a daughter of Sir Henry Champernowne (1538–1570), lord of the manor of Modbury in Devon. He was Sheriff of Devon in 1618.

==== Sir Thomas Hele, 1st Baronet (c. 1595–1670) ====
Sir Thomas Hele, 1st Baronet (c. 1595–1670), created a baronet in 1627, a Member of Parliament for Plympton Erle and for Okehampton.

==== Sir Samuel Hele, 2nd Baronet (died 1672) ====
Sir Samuel Hele, 2nd Baronet (died 1672), eldest surviving son and heir of the 1st Baronet by his second wife Elizabeth Elwes/Elways da. of Edward Elwes/Elways of London. His elder half-brother, who predeceased their father, was Thomas Hele (1630–1665) of Wigborow, Somerset, a Member of Parliament for Plympton Erle in Devon from 1661 to 1665. In 1668 Samuel married Mary Hungerford, a daughter of Anthony Hungerford of Hungerford Castle in Wiltshire, by whom he had one daughter and sole heiress, Jane Hele, the wife of Sir Arthur Shene, Baronet. As he died without male children the baronetcy devolved to his younger brother Henry.

==== Sir Henry Hele, 3rd Baronet (died 1677) ====
Sir Henry Hele, 3rd Baronet (died 1677), younger brother and heir of the 2nd Baronet. He married Susan Eliot, a daughter of John Eliot of St Germans, Cornwall, which family later was created Baron Eliot (1784) and Earl of St Germans (1815). He died childless, when the baronetcy became extinct.

==== Richard Hele (died 1682) ====
Rev. Richard Hele (died 1682) (son of Richard Hele (died 1679), 6th son of Thomas Hele (1568–1624) of Flete), Rector of Helland, Cornwall, who inherited Flete following the death of his cousin the 3rd Baronet in 1677. Although he was not in succession to the baronety, which had become extinct, he called himself a baronet. He married Judith Cary, a daughter of Dr. George Cary (died 1680), Professor of Sacred Theology, Lord of the manor of Clovelly, Devon, and Dean of Exeter.

==== Richard Hele (1679–1709) ====
Richard Hele (1679–1709), MP for West Looe in Cornwall, son and heir of Richard Hele. He married a lady of the Deane family, who predeceased him, having produced an only son and heir James Modyford Hele (died 1716), who died a minor. Richard Hele appears to have had some premonition that his son would die young, as he bequeathed Flete to his close friend James Bulteel (1676–1757) of Tavistock, MP, in the event his son should die without children.

=== Bulteel ===
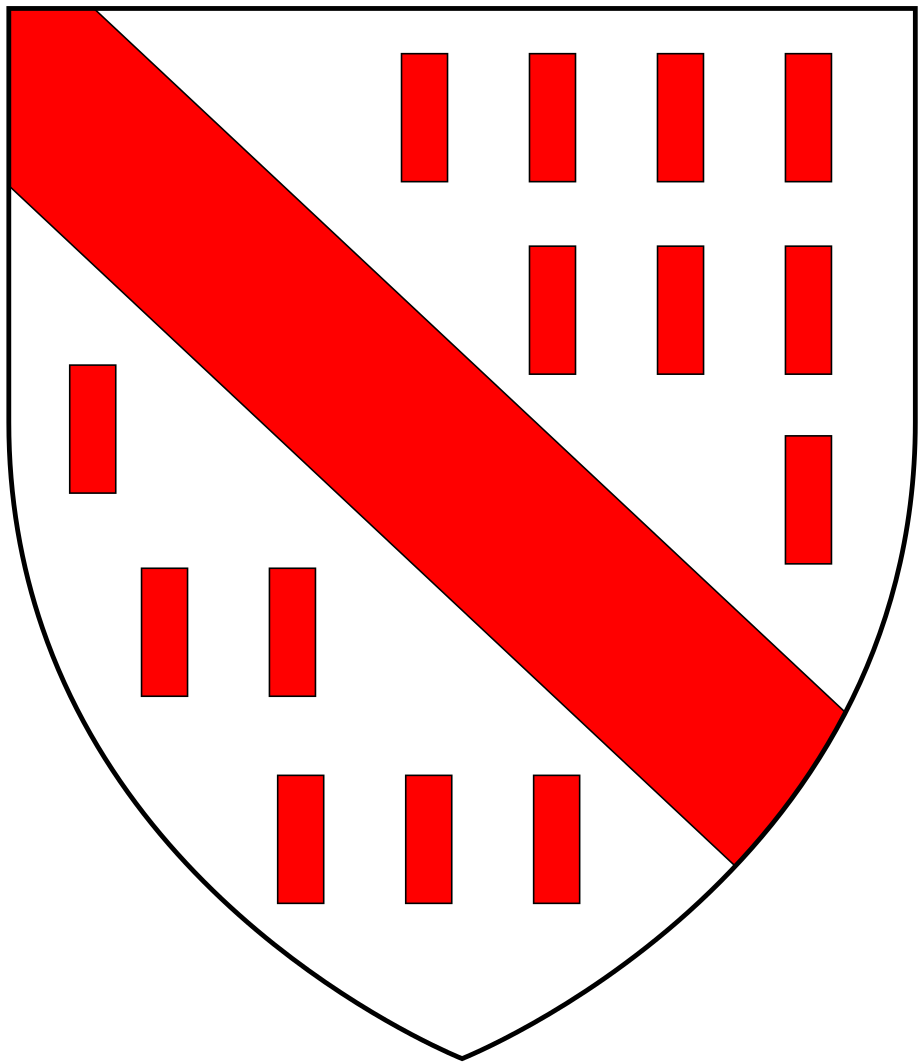
Arms of Bulteel: Argent biletée gules, a bend of the last

==== James Bulteel (1676–1757) ====
James Bulteel (1676–1757) of Tavistock in Devon, was a Member of Parliament for Tavistock 1703–8 and 1711–15, He married Mary Crocker, daughter and heiress of Courtenay Crocker (died 1740), of Lyneham, Yealmpton, and thus had two important estates in his ownership: Lyneham and Flete.

==== James Courtenay Bulteel (1720–1746) ====
James Courtenay Bulteel (1720–1746), eldest son and heir apparent, who predeceased his father. In 1738, aged 18, he matriculated at Balliol College, Oxford. He died aged 26 and was buried at Yealmpton, leaving a one-year-old son, Courtenay Croker Bulteel.

==== Courtenay Croker Bulteel ====
Courtenay Croker Bulteel matriculated at Balliol College, Oxford in 1764, aged 19. According to John Swete, he died while young at his seat of Lyneham, when Flete passed to his uncle John Bulteel.

==== John Bulteel (1733–1801) ====
John Bulteel (1733–1801) of Membland (adjacent to Flete) in the parish of Holbeton, second son of James Bulteel (1676–1757) and heir to his young nephew Courtenay Croker Bulteel (died pre-1800), of Flete and Lyneham. Having inherited his paternal estate of Flete from his young nephew Courtenay Croker Bulteel of Flete and Lyneham, Yealmpton, John Bulteel made Flete his own residence and installed one of his sons at Lyneham. He sold Membland to Peter Perring (died 1796) of the City of London, who had made a fortune in the East Indies.

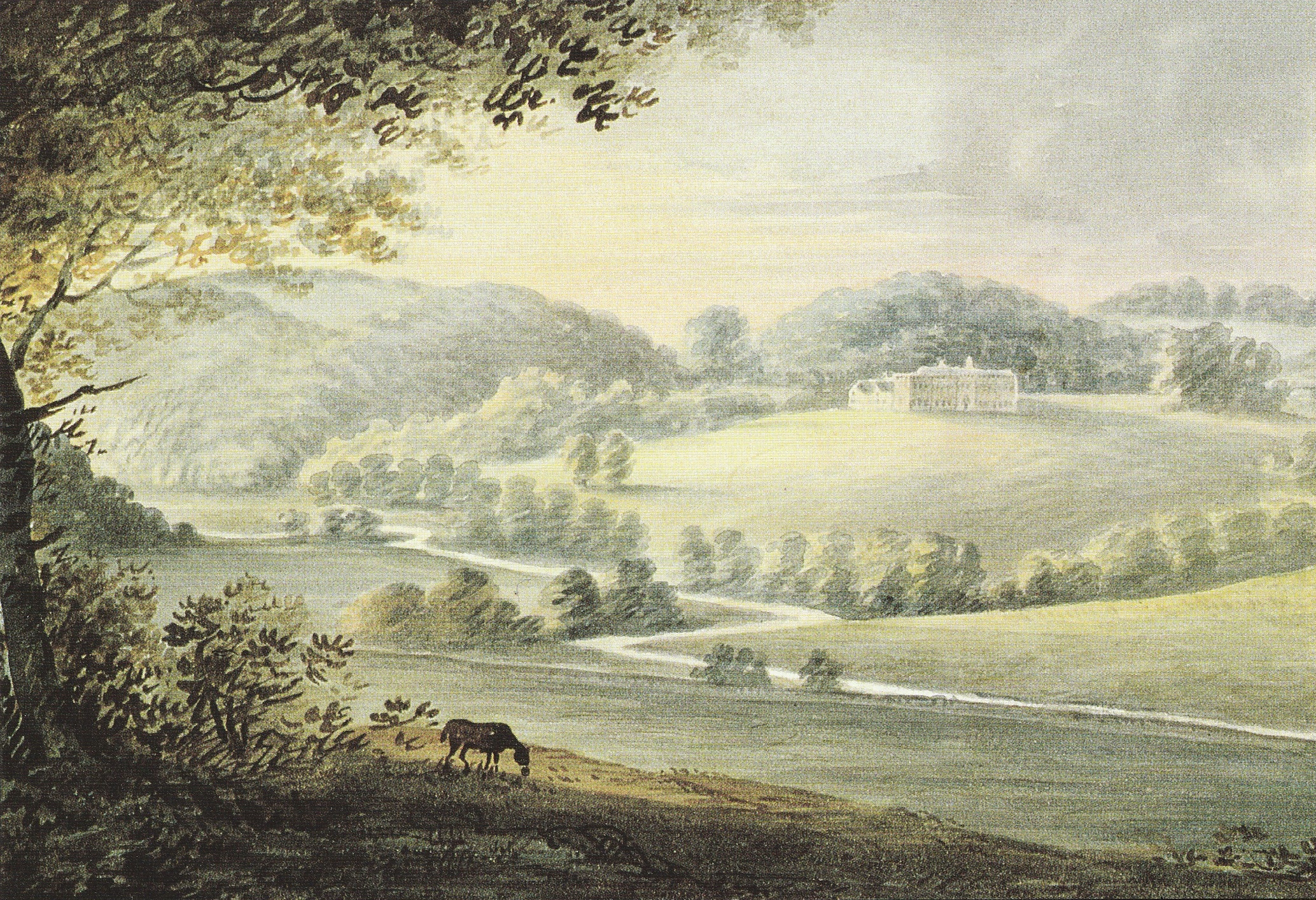
"Fleet, seat of John Bulteel, Esq.", watercolour dated January 1794 by Rev John Swete

John Swete visited John Bulteel at Flete ("Fleet") in June 1793 and recorded in his travel journal that Bulteel showed him

in what manner he had contrived, in the erection of his handsome front, not to destroy the principal part of the old Mansion; which I had remember'd about 20 years ago, a very venerable and extensive pile of Buildings – from the room in which we had been sitting at the Eastern extremity of the new front I was conducted through two others, to the other end on the West – which I found was lighted at both its extreme parts (for it was of an oblong form) preserving in the modern front a uniformity in its windows with the rest of the Building; and retaining at the opposite end an old semicircular window, with its stone mullions – through this, I perceived another similar bow correspondent – separated from each other by a doorway &c that in its antient state had formed the Western entrance.

John Bulteel married Diana Bellenden, a daughter of the Scottish Lord of Parliament John Bellenden, 3rd Lord Bellenden (1685–1741). A mural monument to John Bulteel survives in Holbeton Church showing two oval escutcheons the one at dexter showing the arms of Bulteel: Argent semée of billets gules, a bend of the last with inescutcheon of pretence of Croker of Lyneham (Argent, a chevron engrailed gules between three crows proper), the one at sinister showing Bulteel quartering Croker, impaling: Gules, a stag's head and neck couped between three cross crosslets fitchy within a double tressure flory counter-flory or (Bellenden). Above both shields is the crest of Bulteel: Out of a crown gules two wings argent bilettée of the first.

==== John Bulteel (1763–1837) ====
John Bulteel (1763–1837), eldest surviving son and heir, Sheriff of Devon in 1807. In 1788 he married Elizabeth Perring (1766–1835), daughter and sole heiress of Thomas Perring (1732–1791), a merchant of the City of London and elder brother of Peter Perring (1743–1796) who had purchased Membland from John Bulteel's father.(See: Membland). Her first cousin and neighbour was Sir John Perring, 1st Baronet (1765–1831), of Membland, a banker and Mayor of London, who inherited Membland from his uncle Peter Perring. The ancestor of Thomas and Peter Perring was Philip Perring (died 1716) of Modbury, Devon, a clothier and serge maker. Elizabeth's mural monument survives in Holbeton Church, showing in relief sculpture of white marble, a lady in classical Greek attire mourning over a casket.

==== John Crocker Bulteel (1793–1843) ====
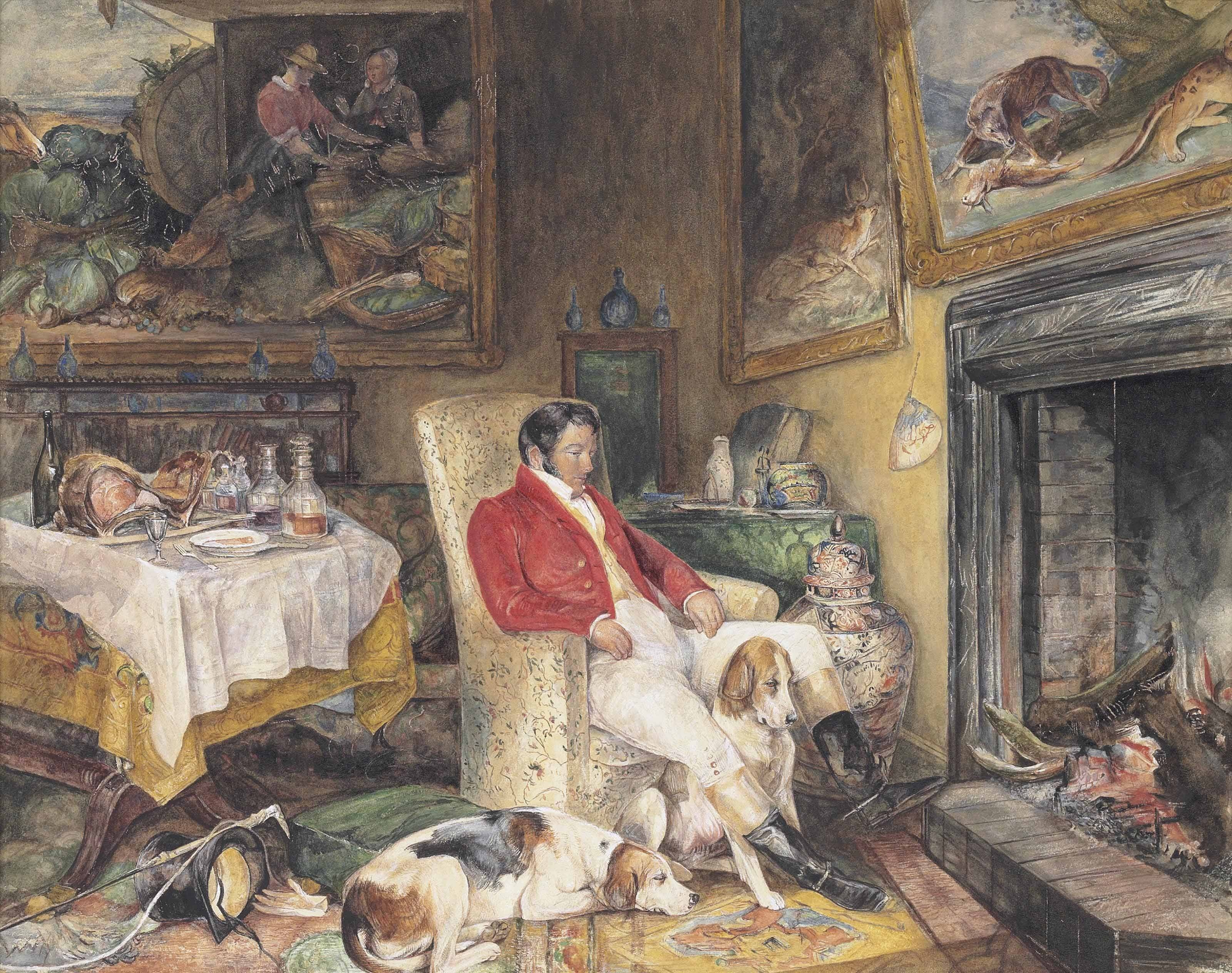
John Crocker Bulteel relaxing after a day's hunting. Watercolour by John Frederick Lewis

John Crocker Bulteel (1793–1843) of Flete and Lyneham, eldest son and heir, a Whig MP for South Devon 1832–4 and Sheriff of Devon in 1841. He was Master of the Dartmoor Foxhounds and bred the finest pack of hounds in England. In 1826 he married Lady Elizabeth Grey (died 1880), second daughter of Charles Grey, 2nd Earl Grey (1764–1845), Prime Minister of the United Kingdom of Great Britain and Ireland from 1830 to 1834, covering the period of the Reform Act 1832. In about 1835 he remodelled Flete House, in the castellated Gothic revival style pioneered by Horace Walpole (1717–1797) at Strawberry Hill House, near London. The great cost of the work, added to losses he suffered on speculative investments, later forced his son to sell the estate, then comprising about 5,000 acres (c. 2,080 ha).

==== John Bulteel (1827–1897) ====
John Bulteel (1827–1897), son and heir, who in 1863 sold Fleet to William Francis Splatt and moved his residence to Pamflete, a much smaller house, in the same parish of Holbeton. The Bulteel family remained at Pamflete until after 1937. It was later acquired by the Mildmay family of Flete, who still own it today. It was rented by Michael Heseltine, when Member of Parliament for Tavistock, from 1966 to 1973.

=== Splatt ===
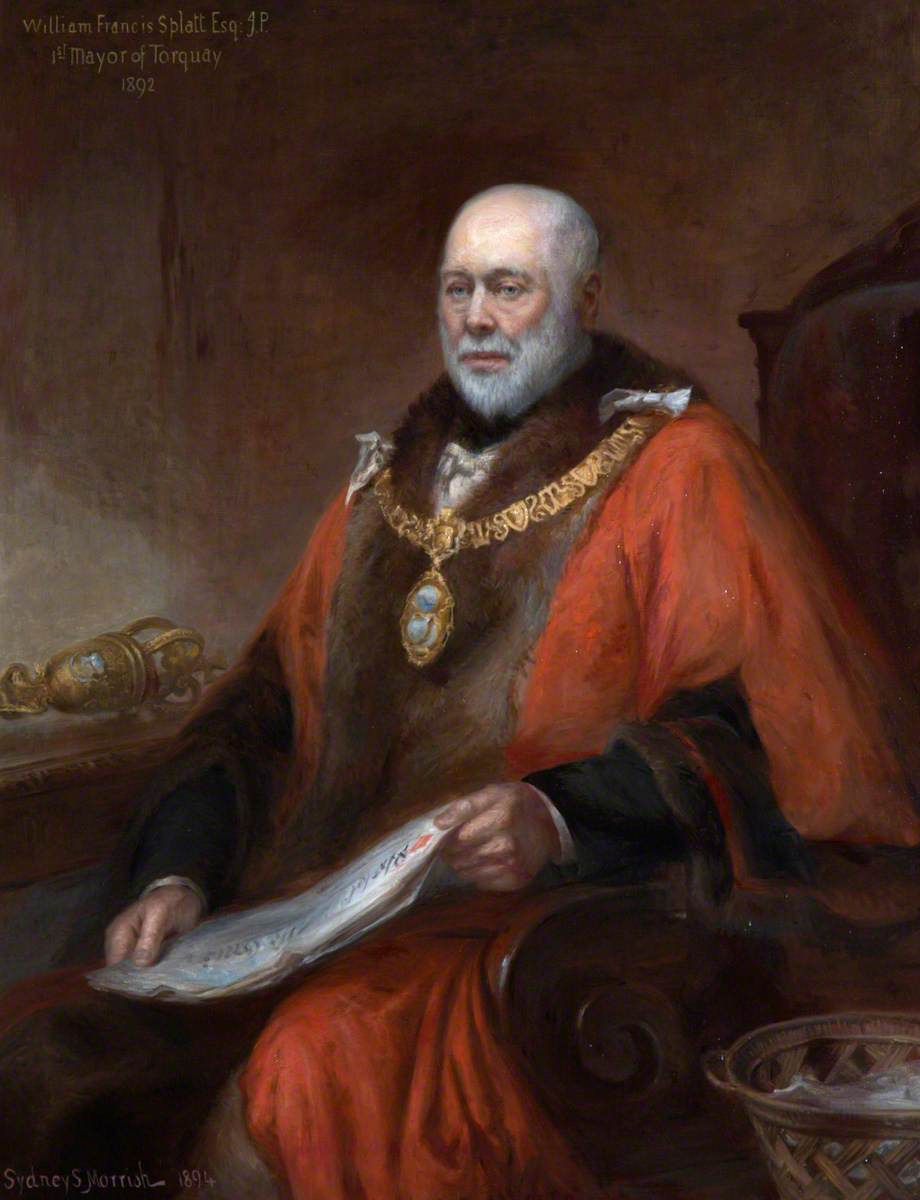
Portrait of Splatt when mayor of Torquay in 1892, by Sydney Sprague Morrish, 1894

In 1863 Flete was purchased by William Francis Splatt, J.P. He was born in the parish of Chudleigh, Devon; emigrated in 1840 to Australia where he made a fortune as a merchant and pastoralist, and became a member of the first Victorian Legislative Council. He returned to England in 1854 and lived at Flete from 1863 or 64 until he sold it in 1876 to Henry Bingham Mildmay, brother-in-law of John Bulteel, and moved to Torquay where he became that town's first mayor in 1892, one year before his death.

=== Mildmay ===
Arms of Mildmay: Argent, three lions rampant azure

==== Henry Bingham Mildmay (died 1905) ====
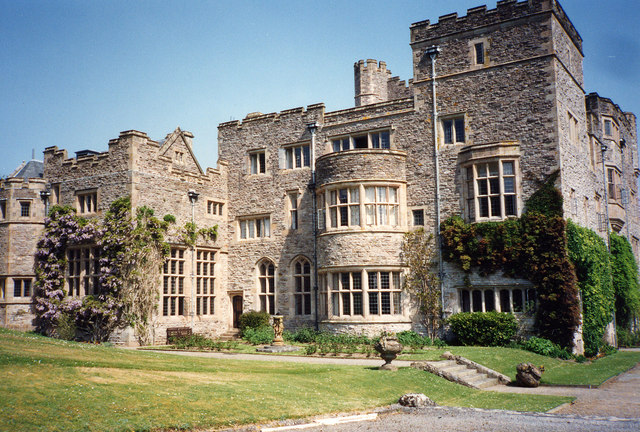
Flete House viewed in 1990, as rebuilt by Henry Bingham Mildmay (died 1905)

Henry Bingham Mildmay (died 1905) of Shoreham Place in Kent, a partner in Barings Bank, brother-in-law of John Bulteel, having married the latter's sister Georgiana Bulteel (died 1899). In 1872 he acquired Mothecombe House, near Flete, in the parish of Holbeton, a small Queen Anne mansion built by John Pollexfen in the 1720s. In 1876 he purchased his wife's ancestral home of Flete from William Splatt, and between 1878 and 1885 he rebuilt it in the form surviving today, to the design of the architect Norman Shaw, whose services had been used by other partners in Barings Bank. He restored Holbeton Church (1885–9) and purchased the nearby estate of Mothecombe. In 1890 Barings Brothers Bank faced near ruin and was saved by the Bank of England and a consortium of city banks. As part of the arrangement Mildmay and Lord Revelstoke had to convey their estates of Flete and Membland to the Bank of England.

==== Francis Bingham Mildmay, 1st Baron Mildmay (1861–1947) ====
Francis Bingham Mildmay, 1st Baron Mildmay of Flete (1861–1947), son and heir. In 2016 much of the original Flete estate, seemingly including the freehold of Flete House itself, is still owned by the Mildmay family. In World War II Flete House was requisitioned to serve as a replacement for the Freedom Fields Maternity Hospital, which had suffered bomb damage. 9,000 babies were born at Flete during that period. The Mildmay family recovered possession after the war, and converted it into retirement apartments.

==== Anthony Bingham Mildmay, 2nd Baron Mildmay (1909–1950) ====
Anthony Bingham Mildmay, 2nd Baron Mildmay (1909–1950), son of the 1st Baron. He was a Captain in the Welsh Guards and served in World War II, being mentioned in despatches. He was Governor of the Royal Veterinary College. He was joint-champion amateur National Hunt rider before the war, and afterwards dominated the amateur rankings. He was responsible for instiling an interest in Queen Elizabeth, wife of King George VI, in National Hunt racing: "as the long-term patronage of the Queen Mother can be seen as the single most important factor in National Hunt racing's acceptance into polite society, as it were, Mildmay's contribution should not be underestimated... To the general public, he was "The Last of the Corinthians", a man whose love of steeplechasing in a hard and mercenary age was based not on the profits or the adulation that success in racing brings, but on the pleasure he derived from riding a good horse fast over fences". He injured his neck in a fall whilst riding at Folkestone races in 1947, and subsequently suffered disabling attacks of cramp, which ultimately proved fatal in 1950, when he drowned whilst swimming in the sea off Flete. On 13 May 1950 The Times newspaper stated "that the well known steeplechase rider, Lord Mildmay, was reported missing yesterday after his usual early morning bathe at the mouth of the River Yealm at Newton Ferrers, Devon." His clothes and a bucket of fresh water were found on Mothecombe beach near Flete. A large search party was formed but was called off at nightfall. It was believed he drowned due to an attack of cramp. As he was unmarried the title became extinct.

=== Mildmay-White ===
==== (Richard) John Bramble Mildmay-White (died 1969) ====
Lt-Cdr (Richard) John Bramble Mildmay-White (died 1969), Royal Navy, the son of Cdr Richard Ernest White. He married Hon. Helen Winifred Mildmay (1907–1997), sister and sole heiress of the 2nd Baron.

==== Anthony Mildmay-White ====
In 2015 the owner of the Flete estate is Anthony Mildmay-White (born 1948), son of Lt-Cdr (Richard) John Bramble Mildmay-White (died 1969). He lives at Mothecombe House, a (comparatively) small historic Queen Anne mansion on the estate, built by John Pollexfen in the 1720s. It was acquired by Henry Bingham Mildmay in 1872, and was remodelled in 1922–5 to the design of Edwin Lutyens. The estate lets out 10 houses, including Pamflete House and Efford House, and cottages, as short-term holiday lets. The estate office is situated at Haye Farm, Holbeton.

=== Mutual Households ===
In the 1950s Flete House, outbuildings and 12 acres of surrounding gardens was leased for a long-term to the "Mutual Households" organisation which converted it into 37 apartments, sub-let on long leases.

== Sources ==
- Cherry, Bridget; Pevsner, Nikolaus (1989). The Buildings of England: Devon (second ed.). Penguin Books. ISBN 0-14-071050-7.
- Gray, Todd & Rowe, Margery, eds. (1999). Travels in Georgian Devon: The Illustrated Journals of The Reverend John Swete, 1789–1800, 4 vols., Tiverton.
- Pole, Sir William (died 1635), (1791). Collections Towards a Description of the County of Devon, Sir John-William de la Pole (ed.), London.
- Risdon, Tristram (1811). Rees; et al. (eds.). The Chorographical Description or Survey of the County of Devon (updated ed.). Plymouth: Rees and Curtis.
- Vivian, J.L., ed. (1895). The Visitations of the County of Devon, Comprising the Heralds' Visitations of 1531, 1564, & 1620. With additions by Lieutenant-Colonel J. L. Vivian. Exeter: Henry S. Eland.
