= John Woolcombe =

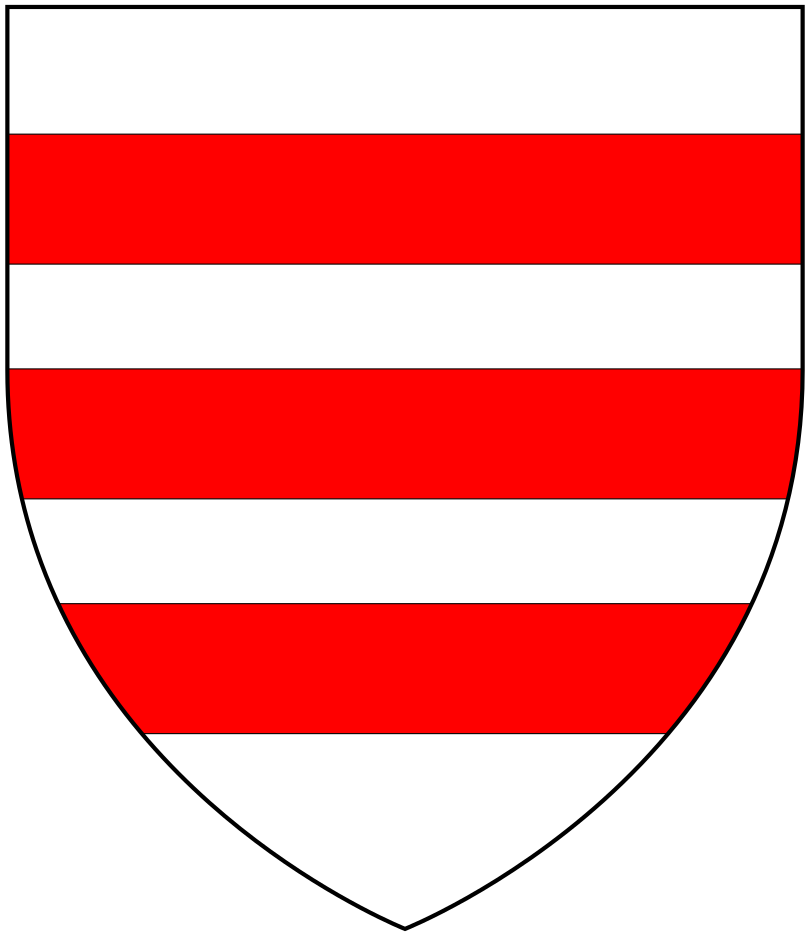
Arms of Woollocombe/Woolcombe: Argent, three bars gules

John Woolcombe (1680–1713) of Pitton in the parish of Yealmpton in Devon, was a Member of Parliament for Plymouth in Devon 1702–5, and served as Sheriff of Devon in 1711–12.

He was the eldest son of John Woolcombe (d.1690) of Pitton by his wife Thomasine Francis, a daughter of Philip Francis, Mayor of Plymouth in 1642 and 1651. His family used the same coat of arms as the ancient "Woollocombe" family of Over Woolocombe in the parish of Roborough near Great Torrington in North Devon (or in the parish of Morthoe, North Devon) in Devon, namely Argent, three bars gules.

In 1692 he became the heir of his uncle Henry Woolcombe (d.1692), who had married the heiress of Ashbury in Devon, and thereby inherited Ashbury.

In 1707 he married Anne Hele (d.1713), a daughter of Rev. Richard Hele of Hele in the parish of Cornwood in Devon, Rector of Helland in Cornwall, by his wife Judith Cary, a daughter of Dr George Cary (1611-1680) lord of the manor of Clovelly, Devon, and Dean of Exeter. Her brother was Richard Hele (1679-1709) of Fleet House, Holbeton, Devon, MP for West Looe in Cornwall. His marriage was without issue.

Woolcombe died in April 1713, a few days after his wife, and was buried at Yealmpton on 20 April. His heir was his youngest brother Philip Woolcombe, Rector of Zeal Monachorum in Devon, who married Elizabeth Blackall, a daughter of Offspring Blackall, Bishop of Exeter, by whom he was the father of John Woolcombe (d.1788) of Ashbury, Sheriff of Devon in 1751.

== Sources ==
- Eveline Cruickshanks / D. W. Hayton, biography of Woolcombe, John (1680-1713), of Pitton, Yealmpton, Devon, published in History of Parliament: the House of Commons 1690–1715, ed. D. Hayton, E. Cruickshanks, S. Handley, 2002
- Vivian, Lt.Col. J.L., (Ed.) The Visitations of the County of Devon: Comprising the Heralds' Visitations of 1531, 1564 & 1620, Exeter, 1895, p. 803, pedigree of "Wollocombe of Pitton"
