= Kitley =

Kitley may refer to

- Kitley Show Cave, solution cave in Devon, England
- Elizabethtown-Kitley, Canadian township in Eastern Ontario
- Elizabeth Kitley (born 2001), American basketball player

== See also ==
- Kiteley
