= John Bulteel (died 1669) =

English politician

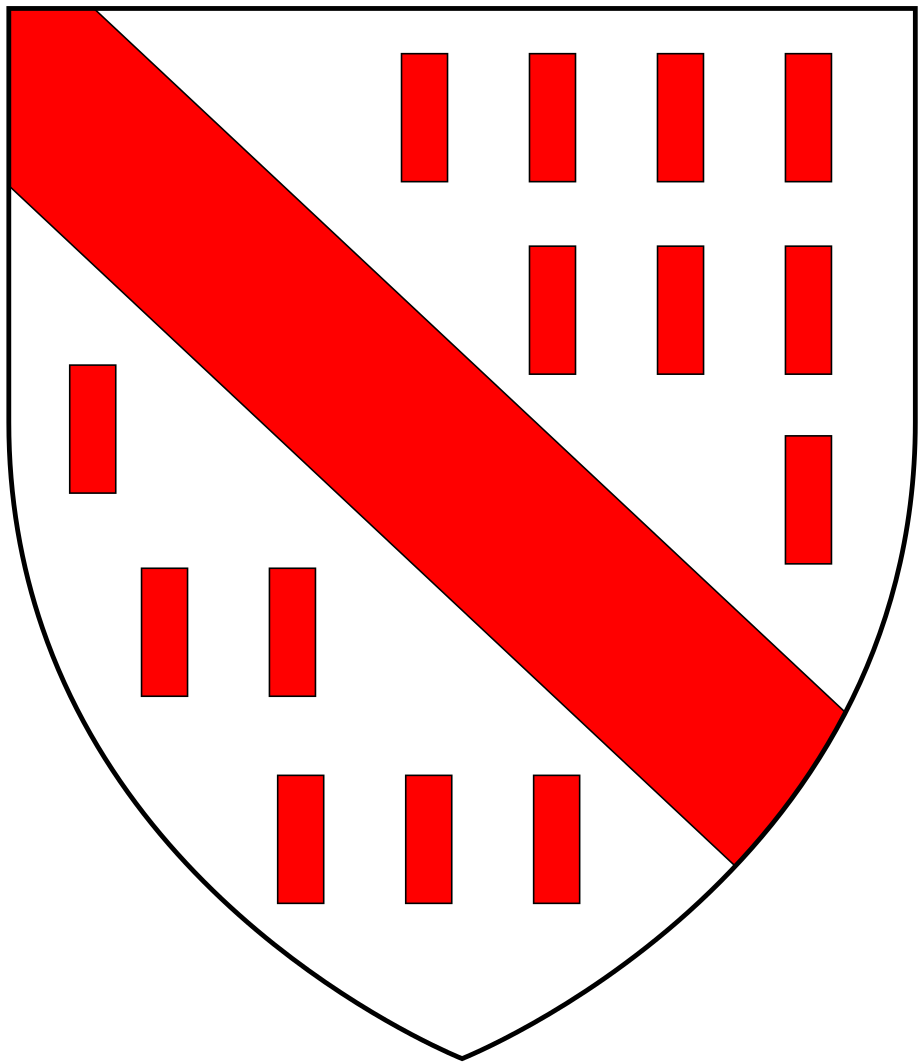
Arms of Bulteel: Argent biletée gules, a bend of the last. Billets are a common feature in the heraldry of Hainault and the Low Countries

John Bulteel (died 1669) of Westminster, served twice as a Member of Parliament for Lostwithiel in Cornwall, from 1661 to 1669. Between c.1658 and 1667 he was Secretary to Edward Hyde, 1st Earl of Clarendon, Lord Chancellor to King Charles II from 1658, two years before the Restoration of the Monarchy, until 1667. He was a friend of the diarist Samuel Pepys. He died unmarried.

== Origins ==
He was the second son of Peter Bulteel, an English-born merchant of the City of London, a deacon of the French church in Threadneedle Street, and son of a Huguenot Protestant refugee from Tournai, in Hainault by his wife Hester Herbert, daughter of Hugh Herbert of Norwich in Norfolk. In 1640 Peter Bulteel was one of the wealthiest residents of Broad Street ward in the City of London. Peter Bulteel was born in England, but classed himself as a "merchant stranger", which status although costly in terms of taxation, removed him from civic responsibility and political commitment.

Peter Bulteel's brother was a prominent pastor to the Walloon church in Kent. John's cousin was also named John Bulteel, a writer and translator.

== Career ==
Between c.1658 and 1667 he was Secretary to Edward Hyde, 1st Earl of Clarendon, Lord Chancellor to King Charles II from 1658, two years before the Restoration of the Monarchy, until 1667. He resided in Clarendon's household. His nomination and election in 1661 for the pocket borough of Lostwithiel was probably due to government influence. He was satirized by Andrew Marvell as one of the lord chancellor's underlings employed to count his ill-gotten gains. He was not a man of great political ambition as he is recorded as having stated that "his life's desire" was to retire to a little cottage near his friend, Sir Richard Fanshawe.

== Armorials ==
In 1660 the Garter King of Arms confirmed to him the right to bear arms as follows: Argent semy of billets and a bend gules, with crest: Out of a crowne gules two wings argent billetté of the first.

== Death and burial ==
He died on 7 December 1669 and was buried in the Church of St. Martin in the Fields, Westminster. He died intestate, and having never married, without children.

== Continuing Bulteel family ==
A branch of the Bulteel family later grew to great prominence seated in South Devon, at the estates of Flete, Membland and Pamflete, all in the parish of Holbeton and at nearby Lyneham, Yealmpton. A member of this branch was John Crocker Bulteel (1793–1843) a Whig MP for South Devon 1832-4 and Sheriff of Devon in 1841.

== Sources ==
- Cruickshanks, Eveline, biography of Bulteel, John (d.1669), of Westminster, published in History of Parliament, House of Commons 1660–1690, ed. B.D. Henning, 1983
