= Membland =

Historic estate in Devon, England

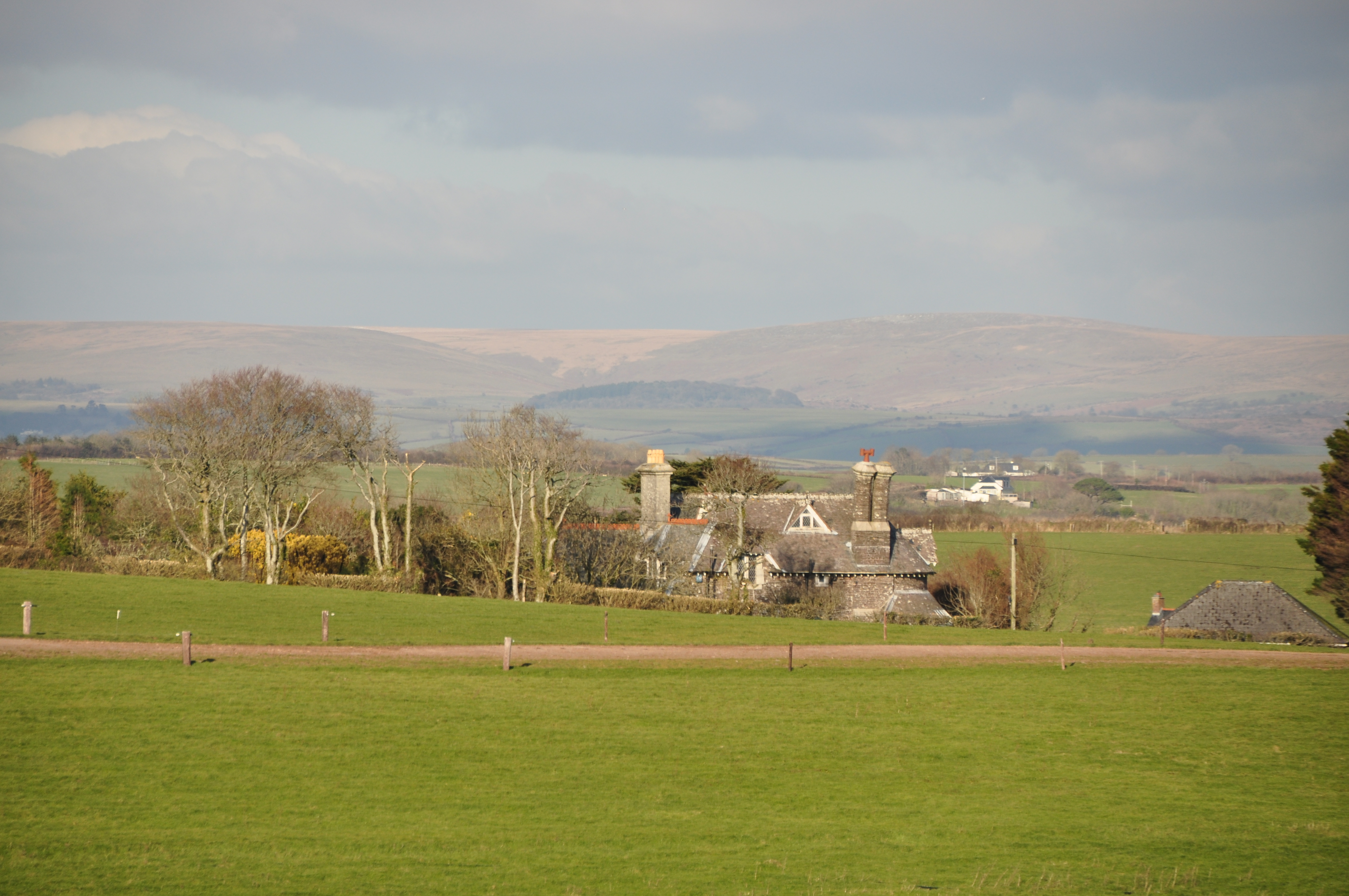
Eastern Lodge, a former gatehouse to Membland, with Dartmoor beyond

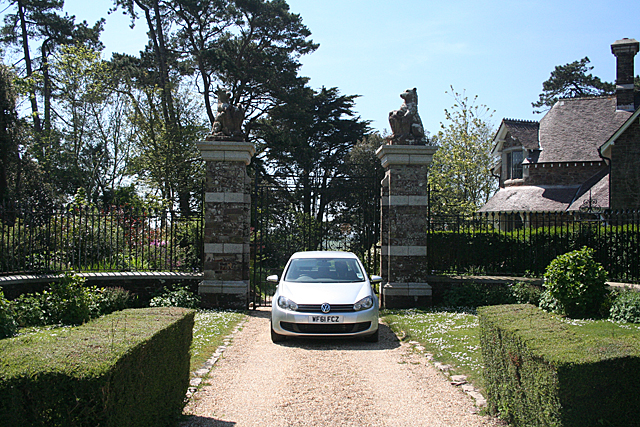
Bull and Bear gates and entrance lodge to the Membland estate. Built in 1889 by Edward Baring (1828–1897), later "Baron Revelstoke of Membland", a humorous allusion to the surnames of himself and his wife and to the eponymous varieties of stock market speculators

Membland is an historic estate in the parish of Newton and Noss, Devon, situated about 8 miles south-east of the centre of Plymouth. The estate was purchased in about 1877 by Edward Baring, 1st Baron Revelstoke (1828–1897), senior partner of Barings Bank, who rebuilt the mansion house known as Membland Hall. He suffered financial troubles and in 1899 the estate and Hall were sold to property developer John Headon Stanbury. A year later Membland was sold to ship builder William Cresswell Gray. The house became derelict after World War I and was demolished in 1927. Several of the estate's service buildings survive, including the Bull and Bear gatekeeper's lodge, stables, gasworks, forge and laundry. On the site of the house a smaller dwelling was built between 1966 and 1968.

== History ==
Anciently called Mimiland, it was successively the seat of the families of de Mimiland, Hillersdon, Champernowne, Stert, Bulteel, Perring and Baring.

=== Hillersdon ===
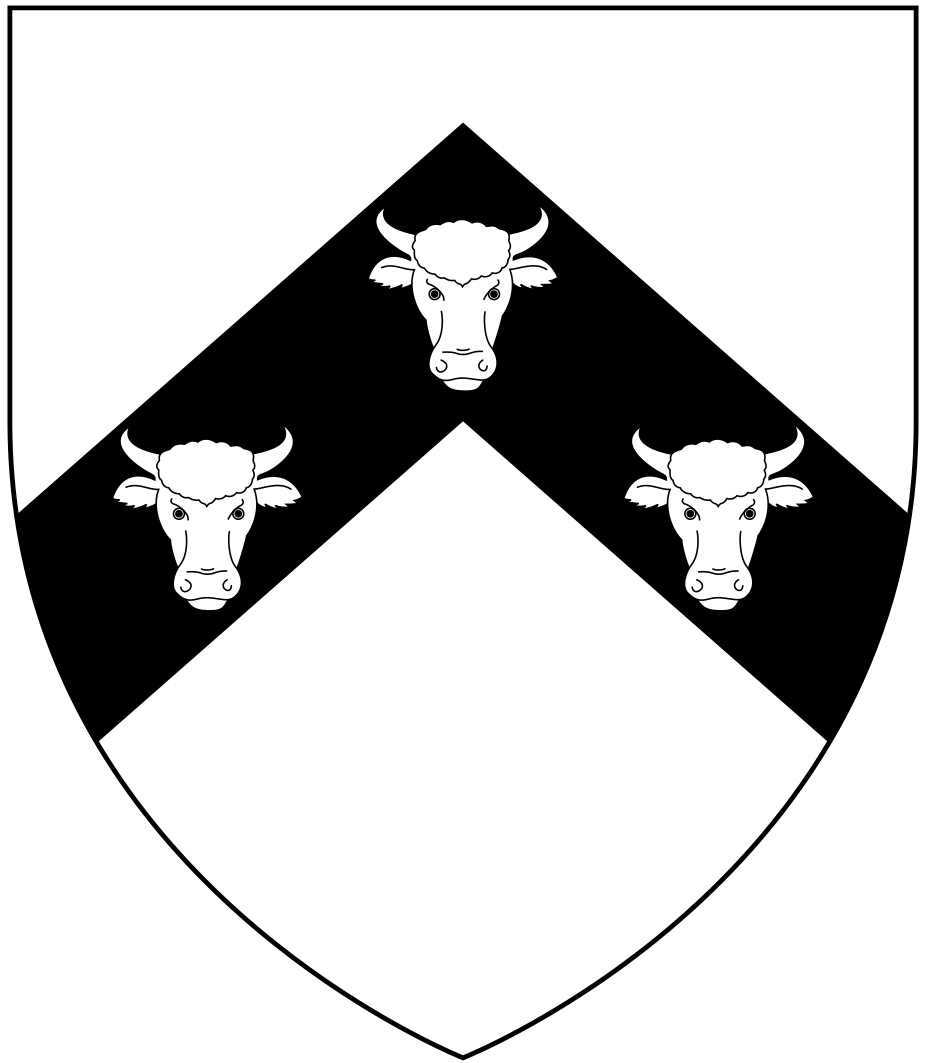
Arms of Hillersdon: Argent, on a chevron sable three bull's heads cabossed of the field

The Hillersdon family originated at the estate of Hillersdon in the parish of Cullompton, Devon, before the 14th century. By the 16th century they had become seated at Membland. Richard Hillersdon (c.1639 – 1703), of Membland, was an MP for Plympton Erle in 1679. He had one son and two daughters, but the son died in or before 1693, after which he appears to have conveyed Membland to his son-in-law Arthur Champernowne (1671/2-pre 1717) lord of the manor of Modbury in Devon, who died childless. His other daughter married Courtenay Croker (died 1740), of Lyneham, Yealmpton, MP for Plympton as a Whig from 1695 to 1702.

On 30 August 1693 Richard Hillersdon of Membland signed a deed of release to Arthur Champernowne of Modbury, relating to the "Mannor of Lambside, messuage and barton of Membland, Pool Mills, Holbeton".

=== Champernowne ===
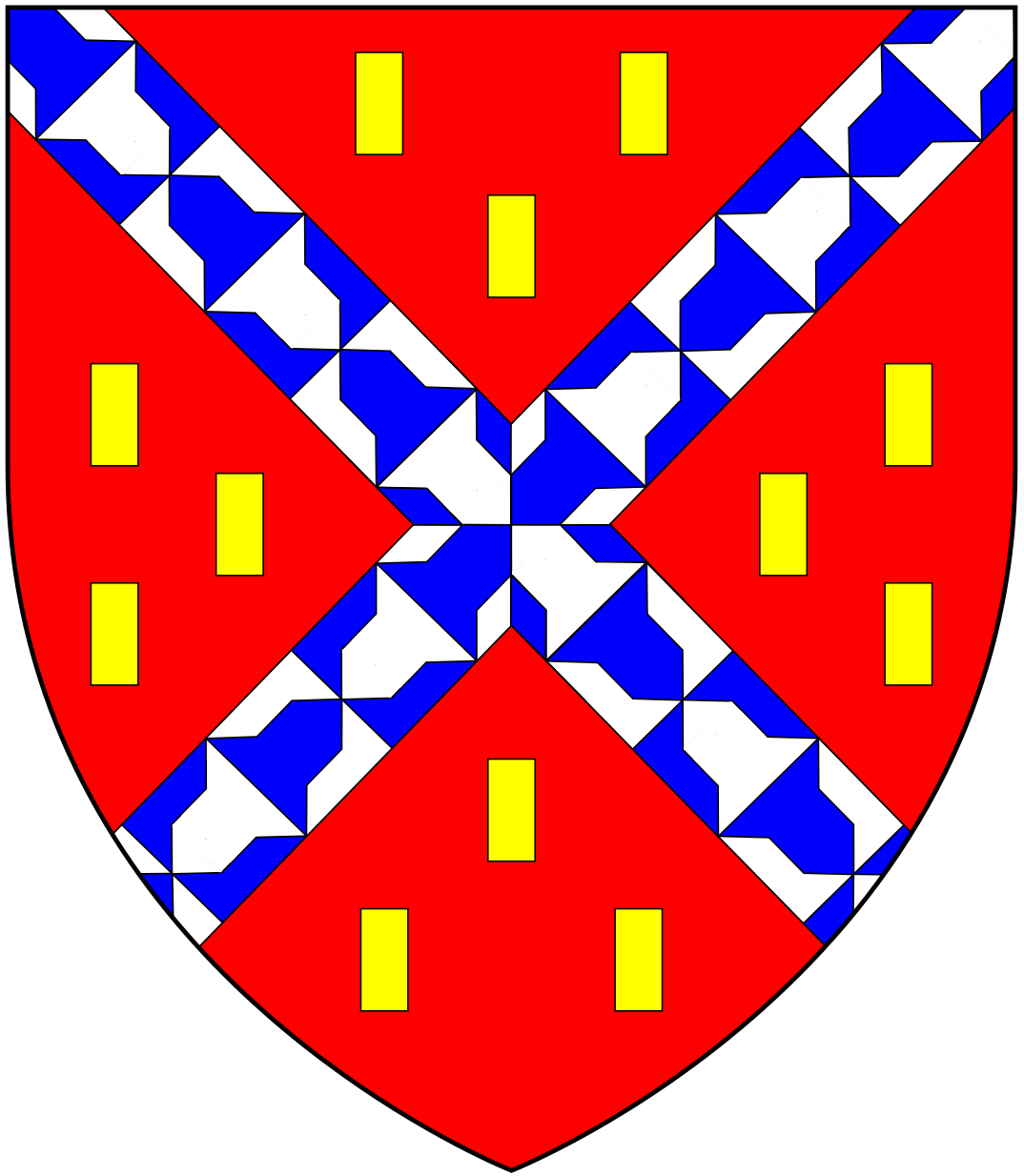
Arms of Champernowne: Gules, a saltire vair between twelve billets or

Letters survive from Arthur Champernowne (1671 – before 1717) of Membland to Courtenay Croker of Lyneham, Yealmpton. Champernowne died childless at some time before 1717, the last of the Champernownes of Modbury.

=== Stert ===
After 1723 the mansion house was occupied by Arthur Stert (died 1755), MP for Plymouth 1727–54, who rebuilt it with detached wings. He married but was predeceased by his only son, leaving two daughters. His family had lived in the area around Plymouth since the early sixteenth century. In 1723 he purchased Membland from the Champernowne family. He received a grant of arms in 1745 as follows: Argent, a saltire gules between four crosses formee sable, with crest: A cross formee sable between a pair of wings elevated argent. One of his parliamentary colleagues wrote of him:

"They say he is an able man, but he has not the gift of utterance; he did not answer the questions put to him with readiness or clearness, but yet, I think, did give answers which might satisfy those who were not resolved not to be satisfied".

=== Bulteel ===
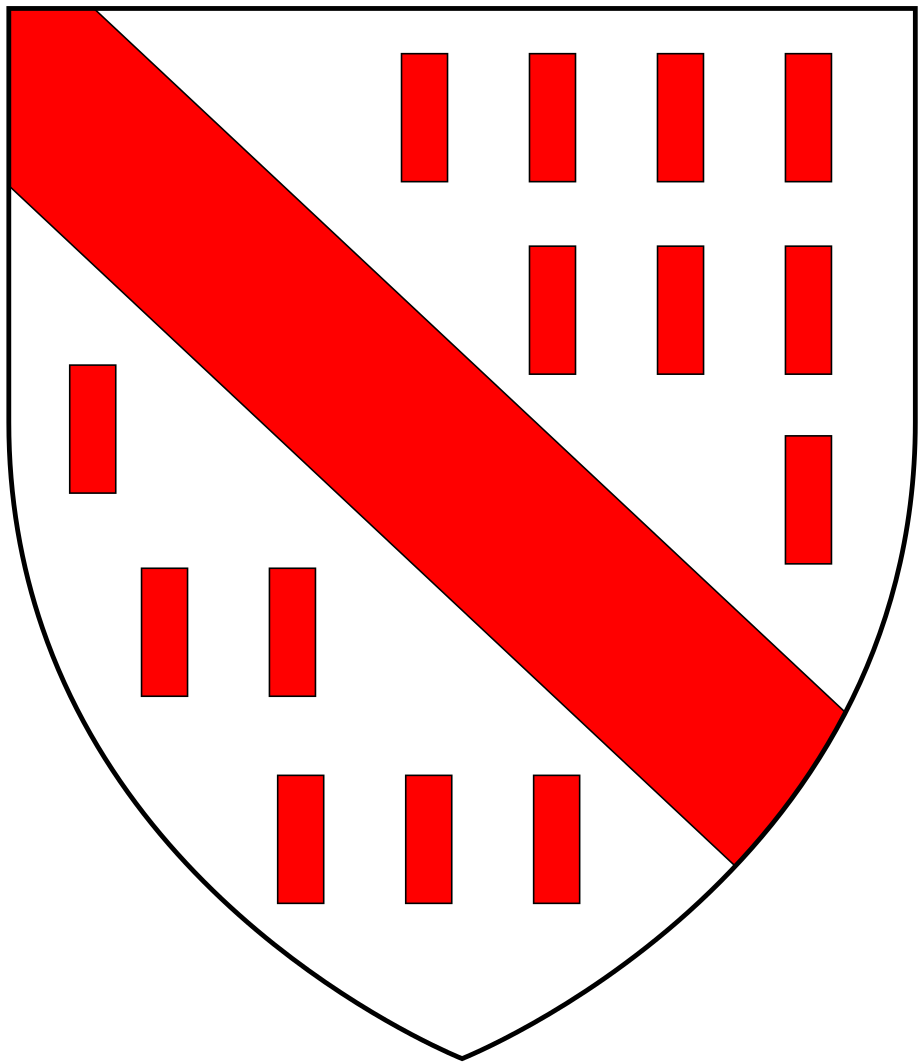
Arms of Bulteel: Argent biletée gules, a bend of the last

Membland was purchased for his residence in 1757 by John Bulteel (1733–1801), a younger son of James Bulteel (1676–1757) of Tavistock and of Flete (adjacent to Membland), MP for Tavistock 1703–8 and 1711–15, by his wife Mary Crocker, daughter and heiress of Courtenay Crocker (died 1740), of Lyneham, Yealmpton. John Bulteel married Diana Bellenden, a daughter of the Scottish Lord of Parliament John Bellenden, 2nd Lord Bellenden (died 1707). A mural monument to John Bulteel survives in Holbeton Church showing two oval escutcheons the one at dexter showing the arms of Bulteel: Argent semée of billets gules, a bend of the last with inescutcheon of pretence of Croker of Lyneham (Argent, a chevron engrailed gules between three crows proper), the one at sinister showing Bulteel quartering Croker, impaling: Gules, a stag's head and neck couped between three cross crosslets fitchy within a double tressure flory counter-flory or (Bellenden). Above both shields is the crest of Bulteel: Out of a crown gules two wings argent bilettée of the first.

Having inherited his paternal estate of Flete from his young nephew Courtenay Croker Bulteel of Flete and Lyneham, Yealmpton, Bulteel had no further use for Membland, and sold it to Peter Perring.

=== Perring ===
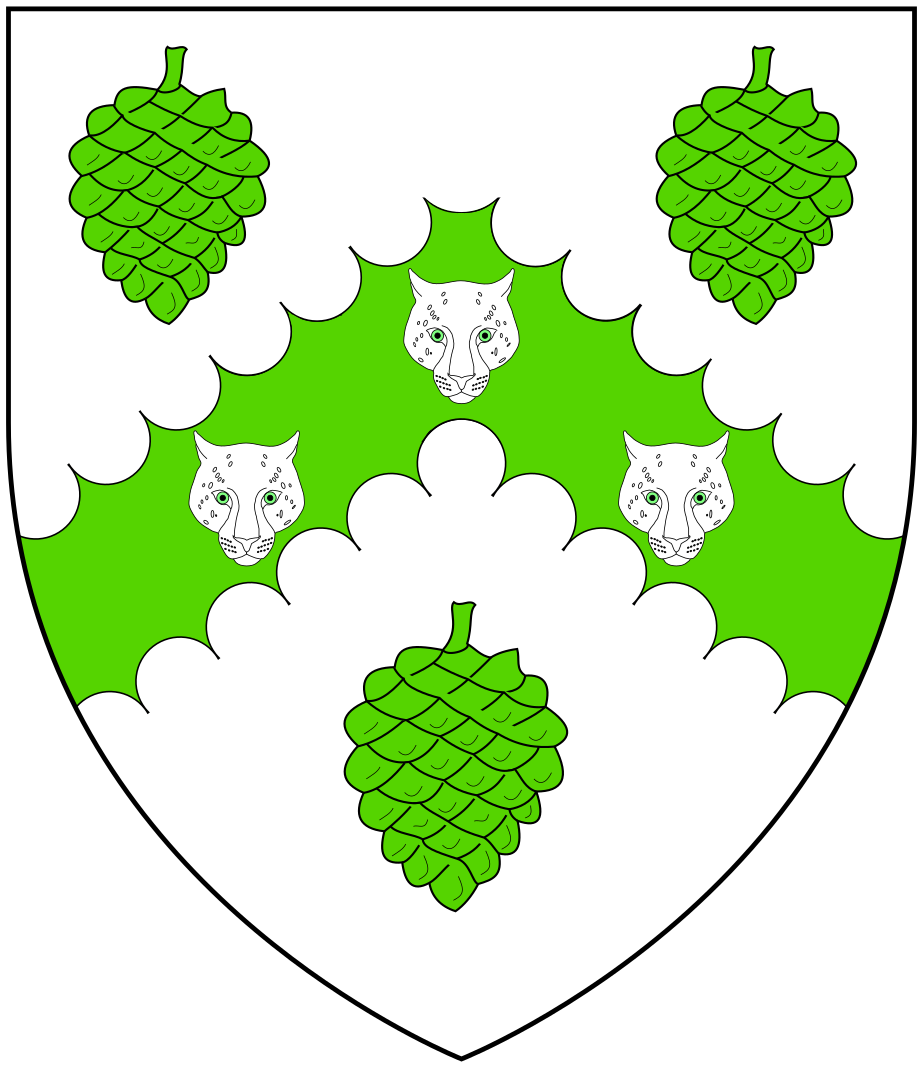
Arms of Perring: Argent, on a chevron engrailed between three fir cones pendant vert as many leopard'sfaces of the first

Peter Perring (1743–1796) of the City of London was the uncle of John Bulteel's daughter-in-law Elizabeth Perring (1766–1835) (daughter and sole heiress of Thomas Perring, a merchant in the City of London), who had married his son John Bulteel (died 1837) of Flete and Lyneham.

Peter Perring had made a fortune in the East Indies. He was the fourth son of Philip Perring (died 1716) of Modbury in Devon, and was the brother of Thomas Perring (1732–1791) above, and of Philip Perring (died 1797), MP, father of Sir John Perring, 1st Baronet (1765–1831). Peter went to India as a servant of Sir Thomas Rumbold, 1st Baronet (Governor of Madras from 1777 to 1780) and eventually became secretary to the government at Madras and a member of the Council of Madras, in which office he amassed a fortune of £40,000. In 1781 he was dismissed from the service of the East India Company possibly for profiteering. On his return to England, he married Lucinda Manning, the beautiful daughter of Rev. Henry Manning, Rector of Stoke-in-Teignhead, Devon, on whom he settled £10,000 and, "in consequence of her extreme good behaviour", intended settling his whole fortune upon her. However he died suddenly on 8 December 1796, before he could sign his will. Peter Perring died childless and his heir to Membland became his nephew Sir John Perring, 1st Baronet (1765–1831) (son of his brother Philip), senior partner of Perrings Bank and Lord Mayor of London in 1803. His bank failed in the Panic of 1825 after which he sold his estates.

A mural monument to Peter Perring survives in Holbeton Church inscribed "In memory of Peter Perring Esq^{r.} of Membland, late one of the Council of Fort St George in the East Indies, who died the 8th day of December 1796 aged 53". Above is a large stone urn and below are shown the arms of Perring.

=== Robertson ===
Robert Robertson, ninth proprietor of Auchleeks, born 7 February 1777, purchased the estate of Membland in 1827. In 1836 he was high sheriff of Devon. A justice of the peace and deputy lieutenant. He married in 1816, Bridget, daughter of George Atkinson, Esq., of Temple Sowerby, Westmoreland; issue, five sons and six daughters. He died 23 March 1859 in the Royal Crescent, Bath, Somerset. In about 1860 Membland was purchased by John Delaware Lewis, the member of parliament for Devonport, Plymouth.

=== Baring ===
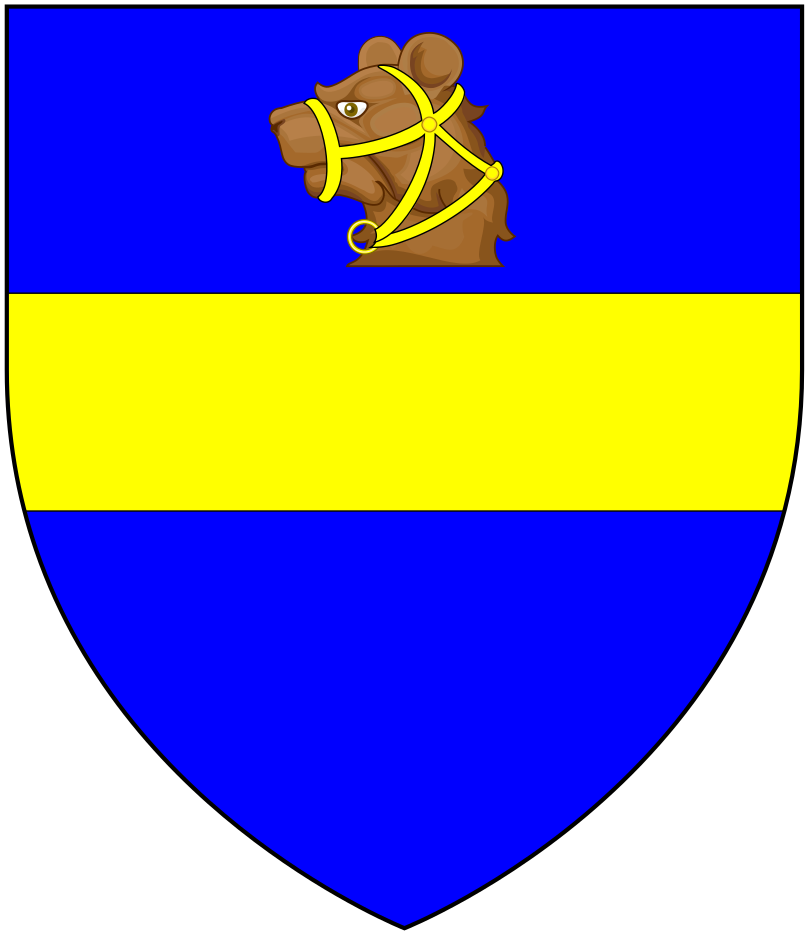
Canting arms of Baring: Azure, a fesse or in chief a bear's head (couped) proper muzzled and ringed of the second

Membland, in about 1877, and the manor of Revelstoke were purchased by Edward Baring (1828–1897), who in 1885 was elevated to the peerage as "Baron Revelstoke of Membland". He was senior partner of Barings Bank, which had originated in nearby Exeter, Devon. In 1861 he had married Louisa Emily Charlotte Bulteel (died 1892), a daughter of John Crocker Bulteel (1793–1843) of Fleet, Holbeton, the adjoining estate, MP for South Devon 1832–4 and Sheriff of Devon in 1841. In 1889 he built the surviving Bull and Bear gatelodge at Membland, with datestone and his monogram. This was a humorous dual reference to the couple's surnames and the stockmarket beasts the bull and bear, appropriate to two families of bankers.

=== Gray ===
In 1900 William Cresswell Gray, shipbuilder from Hartlepool, purchased Membland from John Headon Stanbury, who was a hotelier from Exeter. Stanbury had bought the estate in the previous year and planned to develop the area that bordered the River Yealm. When Gray became the owner, the Membland estate included the Hall and 2720 acres of land. In 1904 Gray purchased another estate, this time in Yorkshire called Thorp Perrow of about 5000 acres, and this became his preferred residence. Membland was reportedly let in 1907 to Sir George White, 1st Baronet for the season. In 1912 Gray put the estate up for sale but failed to find a buyer. He continued to market the property, even making efforts during the early part of WWI by offering to extend the completion until the end of the war. As the war continued Gray offered the Hall, with a sum of £2000 for use as a convalescent home for wounded soldiers, but the authorities considered the running costs would be prohibitive. However, the Hall was taken up as a training facility for officer cadets until about 1919. By the time of Grays death in 1925 Membland Hall had still not been sold, although he had been successful in reducing the size of the estate to 500 acres in 1919 and eventually to 227 in 1924. The House was purchased after Gray's death by Stanley Thomas Pitts with 19 acres of ground; he demolished the building and sold off the salvaged materials.

Pitts, a corn merchant from Yelverton, had bought Membland Hall with 19 acres of land for a nominal fee of £2,200. As the new owner he was placed under an obligation to maintain water supplies from springs to surrounding properties that had previously enjoyed them. For this he received about £50 per year in fees. He had hoped to extend his water supply network to Newton Ferrers, or sell the rights to the District Council, but the impending Plympton St Mary Rural District Council, Local Water Act jeopardised his plans. Under this proposal the council were to install new water mains and these would be in direct competition to Pitts. He took his case to the Court of Referees in the House of Commons in May 1928, but failed to have his objections considered.

== Sources ==
- Debrett's Baronetage of England, revised, corrected and continued by George William Collen, London, 1840, p. 434, Perring Baronets
