= Margaret Croker =

English poet and novelist

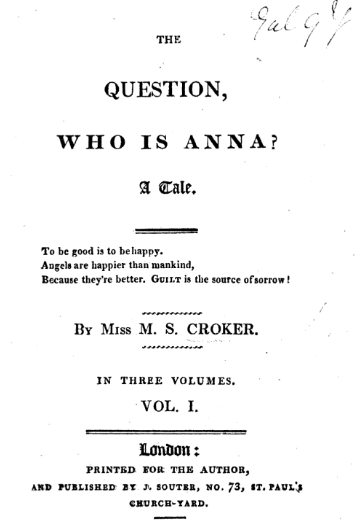
- her 1818 three volume novel
- Born: Margaret Sarah Croker; Before 1773,
- Died: After 1820,

Margaret Sarah Croker (before 1773 - after 1820 ) was an English poet and novelist.

== Life ==
She was baptised on 5 March 1773 in Holbeton in Devon. Her parents were Mary and Captain Richard Croker.

Croker's poems are seen as examples of women speaking out in the hope of getting a woman as a monarch after a disappointing run of male monarchs. Someone who could be "firm" as she says in her 1817 lament A Monody on the Lamented Death of Princess Charlotte Augusta.

Her 1818 three volume novel was titled The Question, who is Anna?. It concerned the life of a woman who was born to unmarried parents. Croker deals with her heroine in a kindly way.
