= Kiteley =

Kiteley is a surname. Notable people with the surname include:

- Brian Kiteley (born 1956), American novelist and writing teacher
- James Archibald Kiteley (1886–1965), Canadian physician and politician
- Jeff Kiteley (born 1937), Australian rules footballer
