= James Bulteel =

English Member of Parliament

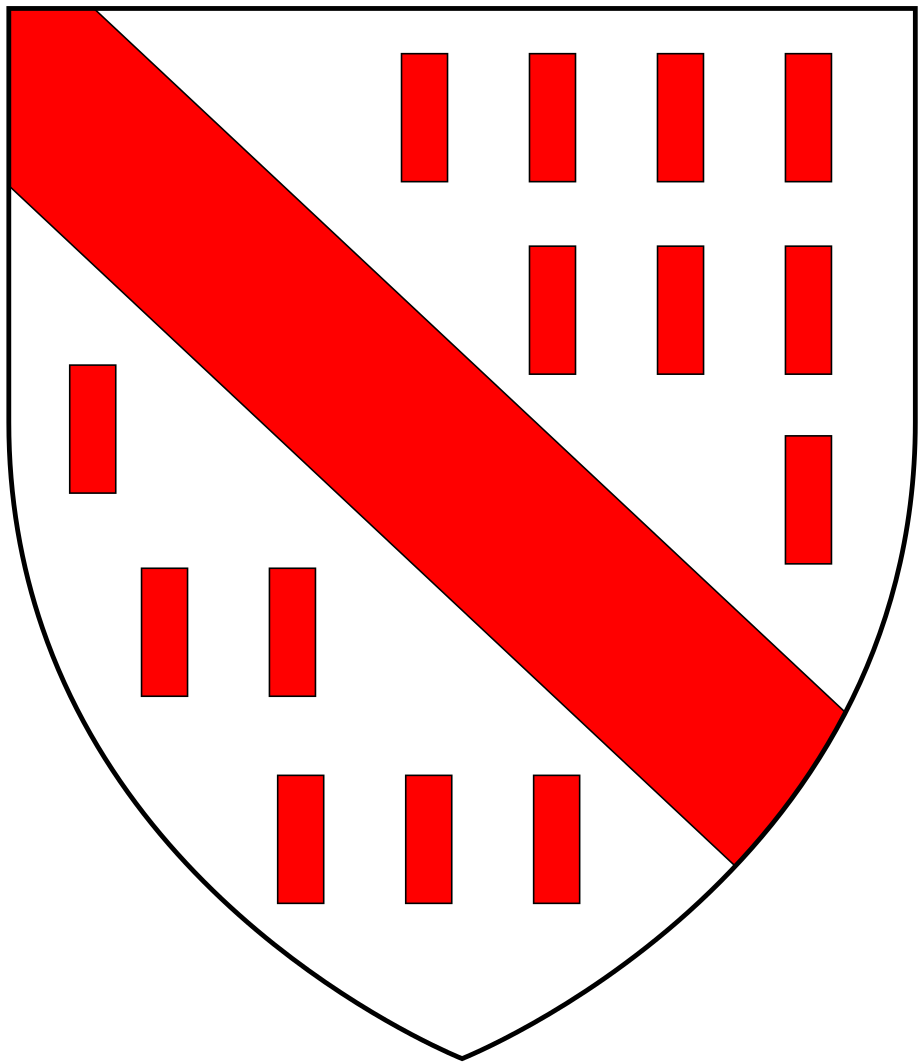
Arms of Bulteel: Argent biletée gules, a bend of the last

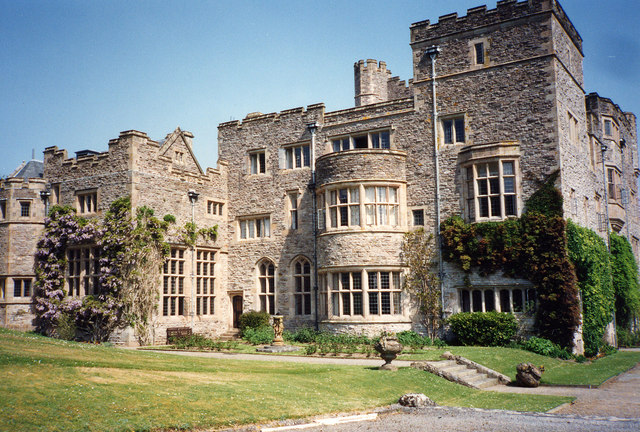
Flete House

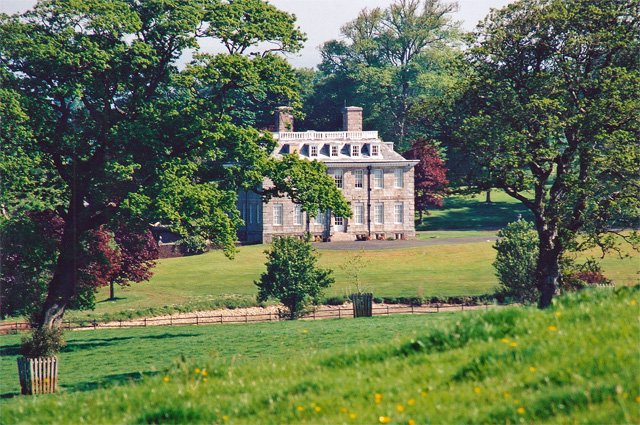
Lyneham House

James Bulteel (1676–1757), of Tavistock in Devon, was an English Member of Parliament.

He was the 2nd son of Samuel Bulteel (d. 1682), of Tavistock, and was educated at the Inner Temple from 1694.

The pedigree of Bulteel printed in Burke's Landed Gentry commences with Samuel Bulteel (died 1682), of Tavistock in Devon, the father of James Bulteel (1676–1757), of Tavistock. The Bulteels were Huguenot refugees from France. However the pedigree given by Prince (died 1723) begins five generations earlier with James Bulteel, of Tournai in Hainault. Certainly there is a familial connection with John Bulteel (died 1669), of Westminster, a Member of Parliament for Lostwithiel in Cornwall, from 1661 to 1669 and between c.1658 and 1667 Secretary to Edward Hyde, 1st Earl of Clarendon, Lord Chancellor to King Charles II.

He was a Member of Parliament for Tavistock 1703–08 and 1711–15.

In 1709 he inherited the manor of Flete, Devon from Richard Hele (1679–1709).

In 1718 he married Mary Crocker, daughter and heiress of Courtenay Crocker (died 1740), of Lyneham in the parish of Yealmpton, inheriting Lyneham in 1740. With Mary he had two sons and four daughters, including:

- James Courtenay Bulteel, his eldest son, who predeceased his father in 1746 but left one one-year-old son, Courtenay Croker Bulteel, of Flete and Lyneham, who also died as a young man (before 1800).
- John Bulteel (1733–1801), of Membland (adjacent to Flete) in the parish of Holbeton, who became heir to his young nephew Courtenay Croker Bulteel.
