= Mothecombe =

Historic estate in Devon, England

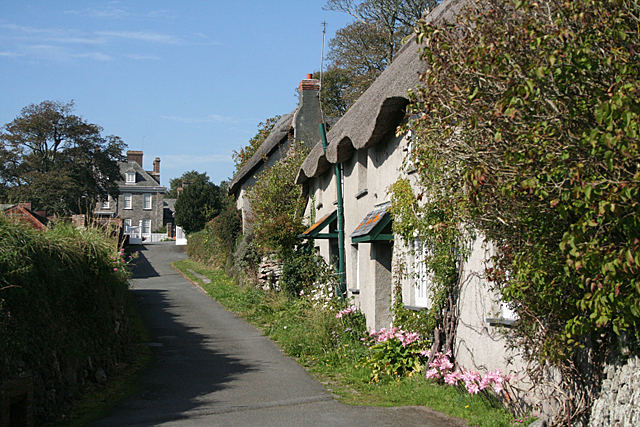
View towards Mothecombe House

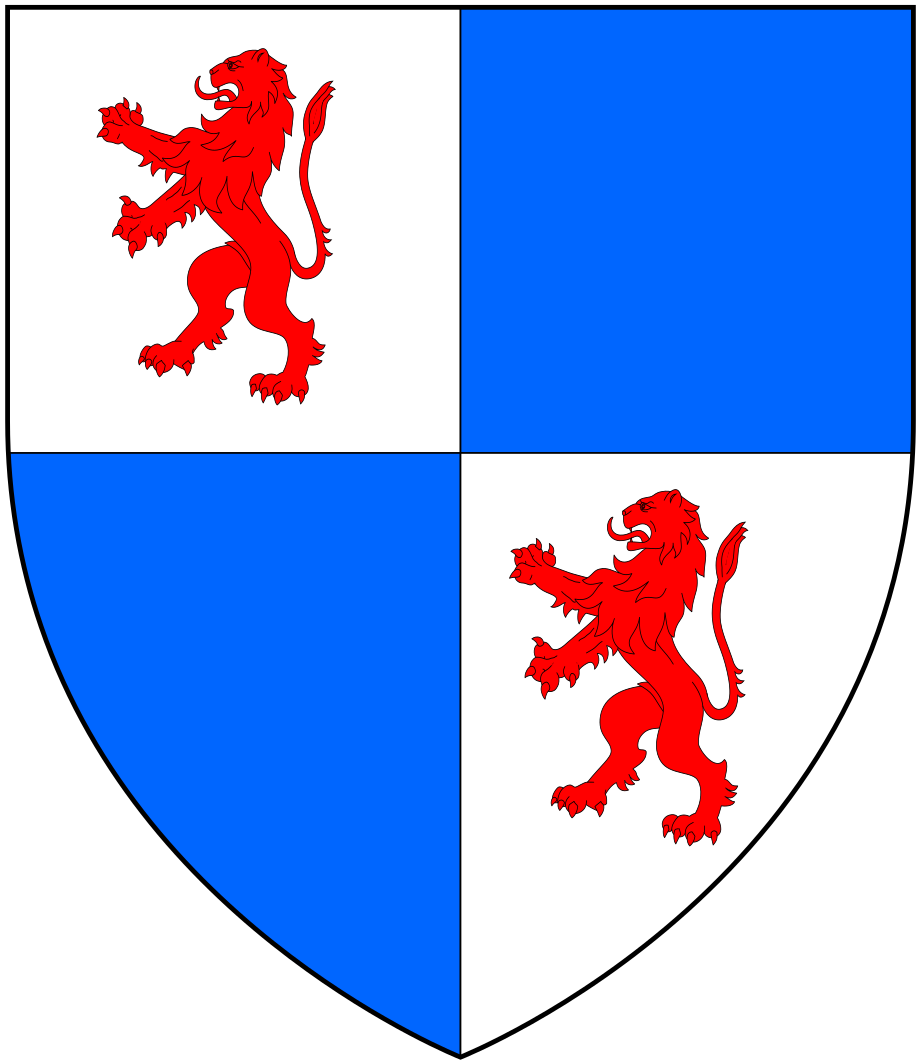
Arms of Pollexfen: Quarterly argent and azure, in the 1 and 4 quarter a lion rampant gules

Mothecombe is an historic estate in the parish of Holbeton in South Devon, England. The mansion house of the estate is Mothecombe House, a grade I listed building in the Queen Anne style.

== History ==
The estate of Mothecombe was inherited by John Pollexfen (fl.1620) of Kitley in the parish of Yealmpton, Devon, on his marriage to the daughter and heiress of Stretchley of Mothecombe. The surviving Mothecombe House was built by his great-great grandson John Pollexfen in about 1720. He was the son of Warwick Pollexfen of Mothecombe by his wife Elizabeth Osborne, daughter of John Osborne of Churchstowe in Devon. Warwick Pollexfen was the younger son of John Pollexfen (born 1619) of nearby Kitley in the parish of Yealmpton, Devon. In 1872 it was acquired by Henry Bingham Mildmay (d.1905) of nearby Flete House in the parish of Holbeton and of Shoreham Place in Kent, a partner in Barings Bank. In 2016 it remains the property and main residence of his descendant Anthony Mildmay-White (born 1948), owner of the Flete estate.
