= Kitley Show Cave =

Cave in Devon, England

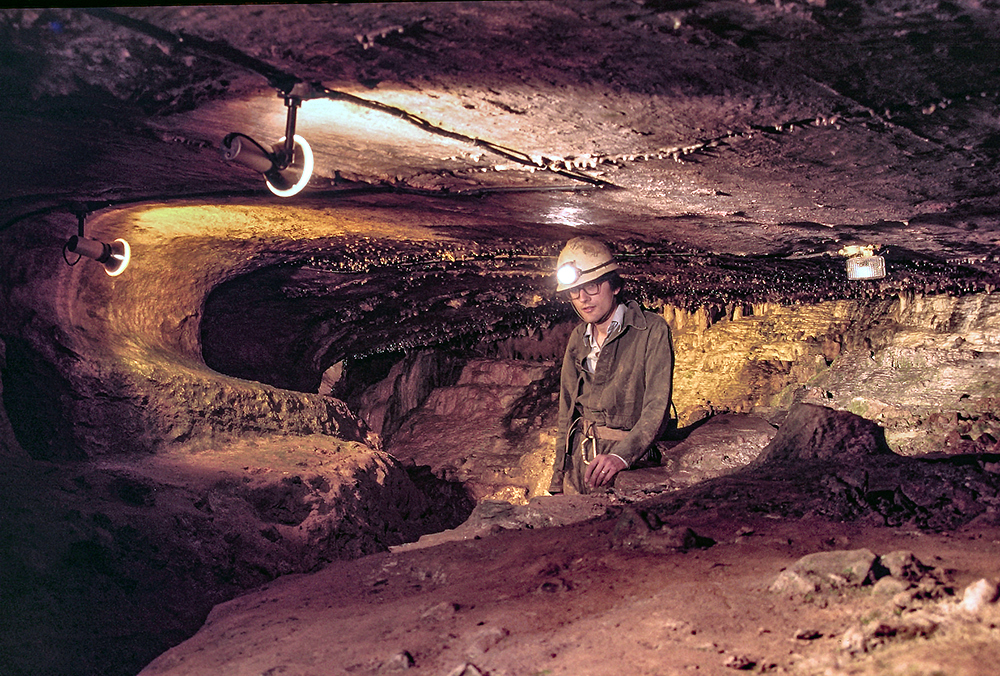
- A passage within Kitley Show Cave in the 1980s

- Location within Devon
- Location: Yealmpton, Devon, [UK]
- OS grid: SX 57535 51295
- Coordinates: 50°20′39″N 4°00′13″W
- Depth: 6 metres (20 ft)
- Length: 300 metres (980 ft)
- Elevation: 13 metres (43 ft)
- Discovery: circa 1834
- Geology: Devonian limestone
- Entrances: 2
- Access: Gated

Kitley Show Cave is a solution cave in Yealmpton, Devon, England. Originally discovered by quarrying, it used to be open to the public as a show cave, but is now closed.

== Description ==
The cave is a fragment of a system associated with the River Yealm, which was exposed by quarrying. The main show cave has two entrances 33 metres (108 ft) apart, both of which lead to the same extensive bedding plane chamber. Originally low, the passages were enlarged by archaeological excavation, and the two entrance passages were originally separated until connected by excavation between 1820 and 1835. The show cave is very short. The Lower Entrance to the north, which is only a little above river level, enters a short passage which after 8 metres (26 ft) passes a flooded passage on the right the water level of which fluctuates with that of the River Yealm. This sumps after 10 metres (33 ft). The main route goes off to the left along a winding passage for some 20 metres (66 ft) to where some steps on the left lead down into The Bedding Plane Chamber. Straight on the passage enlarges, with a large passage to the right leading to a boulder choke. This was passed to reach a chamber some 15 metres (49 ft) high, but the route has since collapsed. To the left, the main path also enters The Bedding Plane Chamber, a low chamber with an area of over 46 square metres (500 sq ft). At the far end, some steps enter a passage leading to the Upper Entrance. The caves are bat roosts and the Greater Horseshoe, Lesser Horseshoe, and Natterer's bats have all been recorded.

An online virtual tour of the cave has been developed by Birmingham University's Human Interface Technologies Team.

== Geology ==
Kitley Show Cave is a solutional formed in Devonian limestone, laid down some 350-400 Ma ago. The cave is phreatic, formed by a river below the water table, but was left dry when sea levels fell which allowed the deposition of speleothems. Animal remains found in the cave date to the last interglacial, about 120,000 years ago, and was found in fluvial deposits covered by speleothems, so the caves must have been active then. The path dug through in 1834 has since been covered by several centimetres of stalagmitic deposit.

== History ==
The Kitley Cave Guide indicates that the main cave was entered about 1800 when quarry blasting exposed the entrance, although a more contemporaneous account claims that it was first entered in 1834 in similar circumstances. When it was opened it was reported as being "beautifully decorated with stalactites and stalagmites", and that the owner ordered a path be dug through the stalagmitic floor, which exposed the bones of a large animal. By 1905 it had been gated. In 1971 it was opened up as a self-guided show cave, with informational boards, within a nature reserve area. Over the next thirty years, the show cave was closed and reopened twice, before being finally closed in 2000. During this time exploration work was undertaken by the Plymouth Caving Group and others, who extended Yealmpton Passage to the west to open up a 15-metre (49 ft) high sloping chamber.

== Archaeology ==
Much of the archaeology of Kitley Show Cave was destroyed when the path was dug in 1835, although remains of mammoth, rhino, horse, bison, hyena, and bear bones have been identified. They were found in fluvial deposits and date from the last interglacial. Finds in neighbouring fragments of the same cave system include human remains and artefacts from the Late Magdalenian period of the Upper Paleolithic, as well as from the Bronze Age, but it is thought that at the time Kitley Show Cave was too wet to be used for habitation by animals or humans.
