= Jeff Kiteley =

Australian rules footballer

Personal information
- Full name: Jeff Kiteley
- Born: 7 September 1937 (age 89)
- Original team: Ormond Amateurs
- Height: 178 cm (5 ft 10 in)
- Weight: 80 kg (176 lb)
- Position: Back Pocket

Playing career^{1}
Years	Club	Games (Goals)
1957–61	South Melbourne	39 (2)
- ^{1} Playing statistics correct to the end of 1961.

Jeff Kiteley (born 7 September 1937) is a former Australian rules footballer who played with South Melbourne in the Victorian Football League (VFL).
