= Yealmpton =

Village in Devon, England

Coordinates: 50.342°N 3.997°W

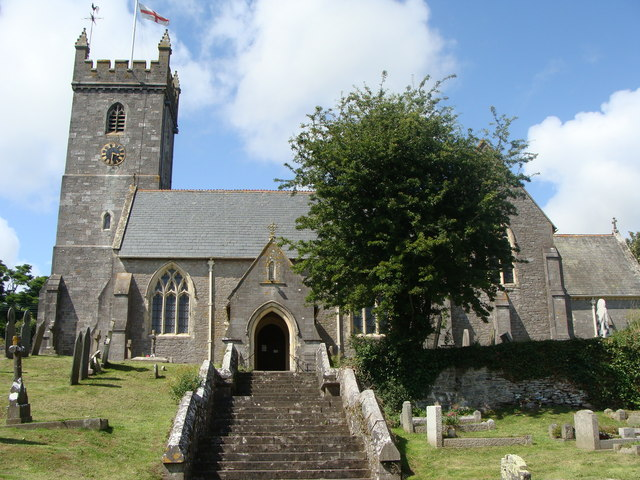
- St Bartholomew's Church

- Location within Devon
- Population: 1,677 (2011)
- OS grid reference: SX5751
- Civil parish: Yealmpton
- District: South Hams
- Shire county: Devon
- Region: South West
- Country: England
- Sovereign state: United Kingdom
- Post town: PLYMOUTH
- Postcode district: PL8
- Dialling code: 01752
- Police: Devon and Cornwall
- Fire: Devon and Somerset
- Ambulance: South Western
- UK Parliament: South West Devon

Yealmpton (/ˈjælmtən/) is a village and civil parish in the English county of Devon. It is located in the South Hams on the A379 Plymouth to Kingsbridge road and is about 8 miles (13 km) from Plymouth. Its name derives from the River Yealm that flows through the village. At the 2001 census, it had a population of 1,923, falling to 1,677 at the 2011 census. There is an electoral ward of the same name. The population of this ward in 2011 was 2,049.

Yealmpton is home to a 400-year-old stone cottage, where it is said a version of the famous rhyme Old Mother Hubbard was written. It is also the site of Kitley Caves, including the now closed Kitley Show Cave, where green marble was quarried; there is an arch of it in the Natural History Museum. John Pollexfen Bastard (1756–1816) a British Tory politician, landowner and colonel of the East Devonshire Militia, lived at Kitley House, Yealmpton.

== Parish church ==
The parish church is dedicated to St Bartholomew and was designed by William Butterfield. It dates from 1850, apart from the tower which was only built in 1915. It is in a version of the Gothic of the late 13th and early 14th century. The font is Norman and the monuments (moved here from the old church) include a brass to Sir John Crocker (1508), one to Mary Coppelston (died 1630) (an arched recess with kneeling figures against the tomb-chest), and several to members of the Bastard family.

== Historic estates ==
The parish contains several historic estates including:

=== Lyneham ===
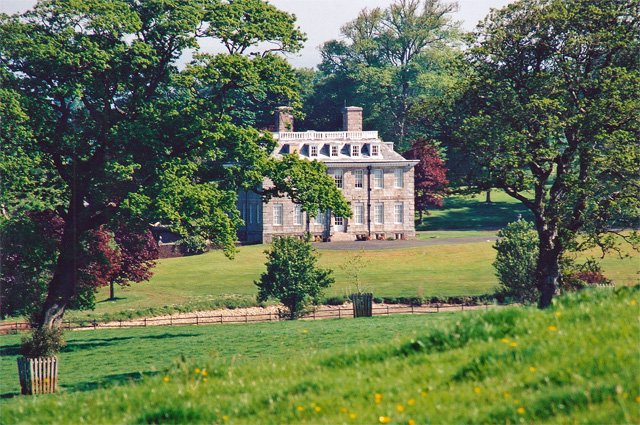
Lyneham, Yealmpton

Lyneham was, After Hele the second earliest known home of the Crocker family, one of the most ancient in Devon according to "that old saw often used among us in discourse", the traditional rhyme related by Prince (d.1723):

"Crocker, Cruwys, and Coplestone,
When the Conqueror came were at home"

The last male of the Crocker family of Lyneham was Courtenay Crocker (d.1740), several times MP for Plympton. The Cruwys family in 2014 still resides in its ancient manor house at Cruwys Morchard where, despite the traditional rhyme, it is first recorded in the reign of King John (1199-1216), or possibly a little earlier. The senior branch of the Copleston family died out in the male line in 1632, but the Coplestons of Bowden survived a further century until the death without progeny of Thomas Copleston (1688-1748), MP, whose heirs in 1753 sold Bowden to William Pollexfen Bastard of Kitley.

=== Kitley ===
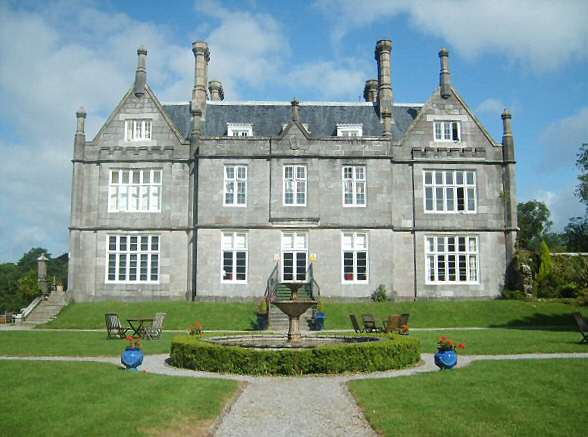
Kitley, Yealmpton

Kitley house is the former home of the Pollexfen family, who also had a residence at Mothecombe in Holbeton.

=== Bowden ===
Bowden, seat of a junior branch of the Coplestone family of Copleston in the parish of Colebrooke. It was first the home of Walter Copleston, 3rd son of John II Copleston (d.1457) of Copleston, thrice MP for Devon, by his wife Elizabeth Hawley (d.1447). Thomas Coplestone (1688-1748) of Bowden was MP for Callington in Cornwall.

== Railway service ==
From 1898 to 1960, Yealmpton was the terminus of the Yealmpton to Plymouth branch railway line. The line was built by the Great Western Railway. In its early days the line carried passengers and freight. The growth in the number of motor cars and buses led to reducing passenger traffic in the 1920s and passenger services ceased on the line in 1930. From then until 1941, only freight traffic ran on the line.

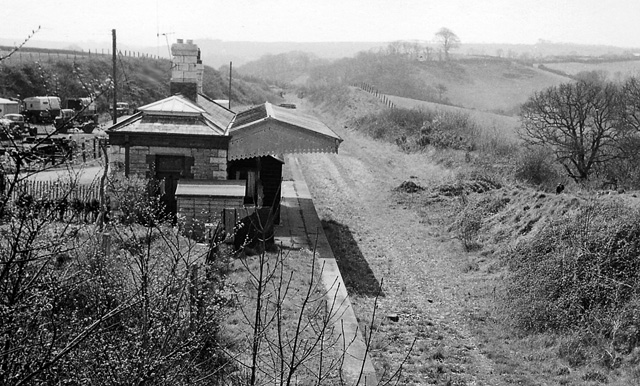
Remains of Brixton Road station in 1964

Passenger services were restored in 1941, as villages such as Yealmpton were then being used as dormitory areas by the people of Plymouth following the severe air raids on the city. The passenger services ceased again in October 1947 and freight services only ran until 1960, when the line closed completely. The station at Yealmpton was demolished and housing in Riverside Walk now stands on the site.

== Agricultural Show ==
Known as one of the best one day shows in the region, 2008 marked the 121st Agricultural Show. Despite the weather, thousands turned up to enjoy the best of what the Devon countryside had to offer. Highlights included the Royal Horse Artillery parading and firing their guns as well as the M.A.D mountain bike display team.
