= Holbeton =

Village in Devon, England

Coordinates: 50.335°N 3.949°W

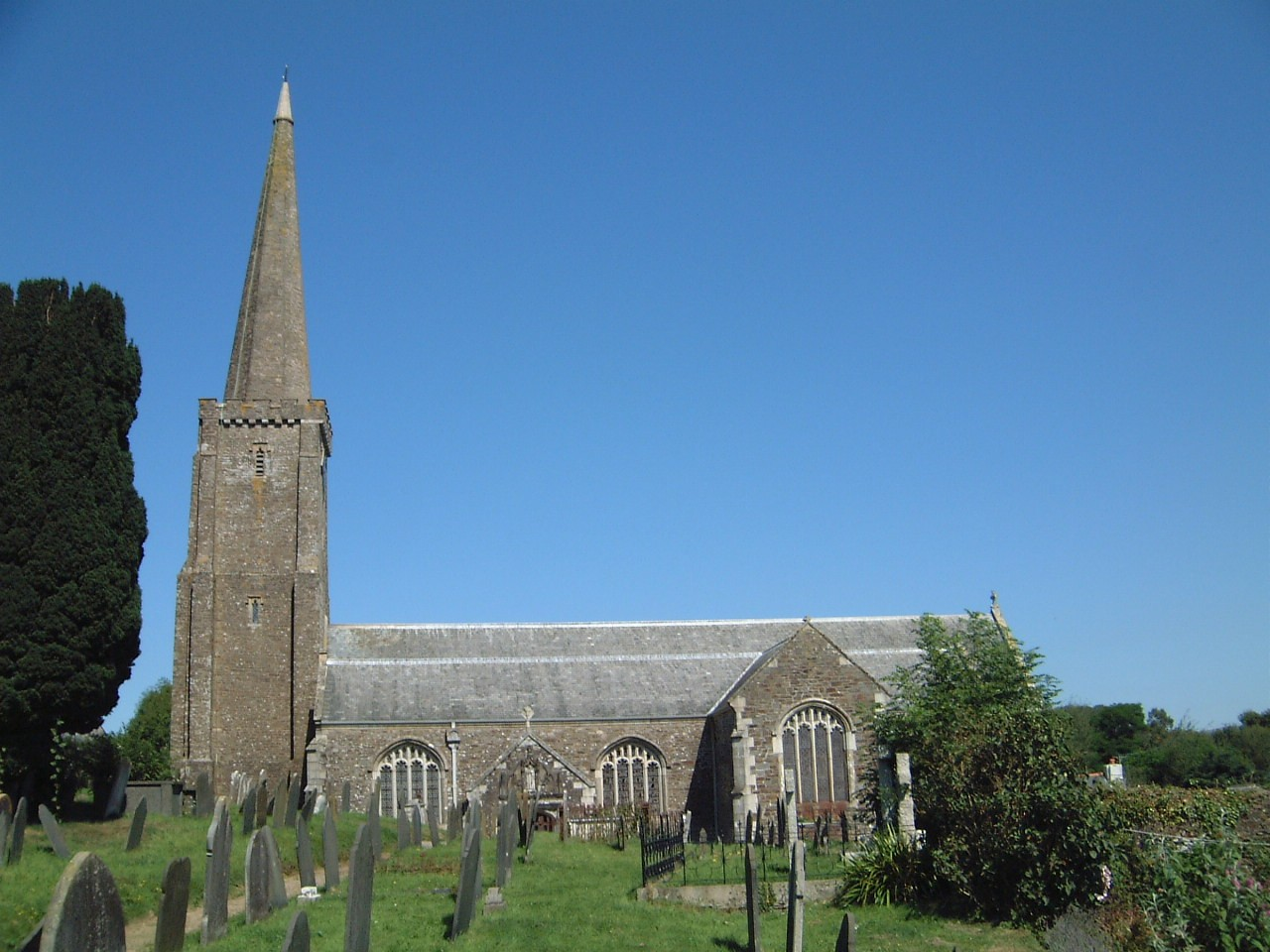
- All Saints’ Church, Holbeton

- Location within Devon
- Population: 619 (2011)
- OS grid reference: SX6150
- Civil parish: Holbeton
- District: South Hams
- Shire county: Devon
- Region: South West
- Country: England
- Sovereign state: United Kingdom
- Post town: PLYMOUTH
- Postcode district: PL8
- Dialling code: 01752
- Police: Devon and Cornwall
- Fire: Devon and Somerset
- Ambulance: South Western
- UK Parliament: South West Devon

Holbeton is a civil parish and village located 9 miles south east of Plymouth in the South Hams district of Devon, England. At the 2001 census the parish had a population of 579, down from 850 in 1901. By 2011 it had increased to 619.

The southern boundary of the parish lies on the coast (at Bigbury Bay), and it is surrounded clockwise from the west by the parishes of Newton and Noss, Yealmpton, Ermington, Modbury, and on the opposite bank of the ria of the River Erme, Kingston. The village, set back from the wooded shores of the river, is accessed by minor roads south of the A379 road, between the villages of Modbury and Yealmpton. Within the parish, north of the village, is the hamlet of Ford.

== History ==
To the east of the village is an Iron Age enclosure or hill fort known as Holbury. Historically the parish formed part of Ermington Hundred and it contains several historic estates.

Flete House is situated in a large park and was formerly the seat of Baron Mildmay of Flete. The house was remodelled in the Gothic style in 1835, and the front is all of this date, but the architect Norman Shaw extensively remodelled the building from 1878 onwards. During World War II it was used as a maternity home, and Dave Hill of pop group Slade was born there in 1946. As of 2004 it was being used as apartments for the elderly.

The estate of Mothecombe was a seat of a junior branch of the Pollexfen family of Kitley, Yealmpton. The mansion house was built by John Pollexfen circa 1710-20. In 1872 it was acquired by Henry Bingham Mildmay (of Barings Bank) who 4 years later in 1876 also acquired Flete, in the same parish of Holbeton, the ancestral home of his wife Georgiana Bulteel, which had been sold in 1863 by her brother to an Australian sheep farmer.

Adeston was held by the de Adeston family. The last in the male line was Gilbert de Adeston, who died during the reign of King Edward III (1327-1377) and left a daughter and sole heiress Jone de Adeston, who married John Prideaux, a younger son of Sir Roger Prideaux of Orcherton. Adeston remained in the Prideaux family of Theuborough in the parish of Sutcombe, Devon, until sold by "Richard Prideaux of Theuborough" (probably Richard Prideaux (d.1617) or his father Richard Prideaux (d.1603)) to Thomas Hele (d.1613) of Fleet, Sheriff of Devon 1600-1.

An early novelist and poet Margaret Croker was baptised here in 1717.

== Parish church ==
The parish church (All Saints) was dedicated by Bishop John Grandisson in 1336. Described by Nikolaus Pevsner as "unusually impressive", it has both north and south aisles and owes much of its interest to the Victorian restoration undertaken by J. D. Sedding between 1885 and 1889 which was funded by Henry Mildmay of Flete. However, the tower and spire survive from the 14th century; there is a square Norman font carved with lions, a tree and leaf decoration; and the rood screen, c. 1535, restored by Sedding, is very finely carved. The east window contains stained glass by Heywood Sumner (1866), and later windows in the north aisle are by Hugh Easton.

Monuments within the church include, in the north chapel, a large one to three generations of the Hele family which includes a semi-reclining figure of Sir Thomas Hele of Flete (died 1670). Also to the Bulteel family, 1801, in Coade stone; and in the chancel a separate one to Elizabeth Bulteel (died 1835).

== Holbeton today ==
The local primary school takes the majority of the local children. The village hall and playing fields are host to many activities including school plays, festivals, and sports events.
