= Croker's Hele, Meeth =

Historic estate in Devon, England

Croker's Hele is an historic estate in the parish of Meeth in Devon, England.

== Descent ==
=== Domesday Book ===
It was one of several estates split-off from the single manor of Hele, listed in the Domesday Book of 1086 as the 47th of the 79 Devonshire holdings of Robert, Count of Mortain (died 1090), half-brother of King William the Conqueror and one of his Devon Domesday Book tenants-in-chief. Robert's tenant was Erchenbald, who held from Robert several other Devonshire manors, including Culleigh, Alverdiscott, Bratton Fleming, Croyde and Stockleigh (Note: The manor of Stockleigh may have consisted of the modern neighbouring villages Stockleigh English and Stockleigh Pomeroy).

The single manor of Hele listed in the Domesday Book probably involves two adjacent manors of that name, one in the parish of Petrockstowe the other in Meeth. Later sources evidence three further subdivisions of Hele which had occurred by that time, namely:

- Hele Sechevil, named after its then lord Richard de Sechevil (the Satchville family were seated at Heanton Satchville, Petrockstowe), as listed in the Book of Fees (c.1302). It was later held by John Crokker as listed in the Feudal Aids 1284-1431. This is therefore believed to have become today's Crocker's Hele in the parish of Meeth.
- Hele Pore/Pouere, held with Hele Sechevil by Robert de Stocheye of Stockey in the parish of Meeth, as listed in the Feudal Aids 1284-1431. Hele Pore/Pouere was later known as Fry's Hele (today corrupted to "Friar's Hele"), after it was acquired by the Fry family. It was held by Geoffrey Frye as listed in the Feudal Aids 1284-1431. Fry's Hele is in the parish of Meeth. This is the earliest known seat of the Fry family, of which the prominent branch seated at Yarty in the parish of Membury is assumed to be a branch, which bore a differenced version of the arms of Fry of Fry's Hele. The Fry family of Fry's Hele died out in the 16th century on the death of John Fry, and his daughter and sole-heiress Elizabeth Fry brought the estate to her husband Thomas Parker (d.1545) of North Molton, thus she was the ancestress of the Parker Baronets of Melford Hall in Suffolk and of Viscount Boringdon and Earl of Morley of Saltram House in Devon.
- Hele Godyng, today "Hele Barton" in the parish of Petrockstowe, held by Thomas Tyrel as listed in the Feudal Aids 1284-1431.

=== Croker ===
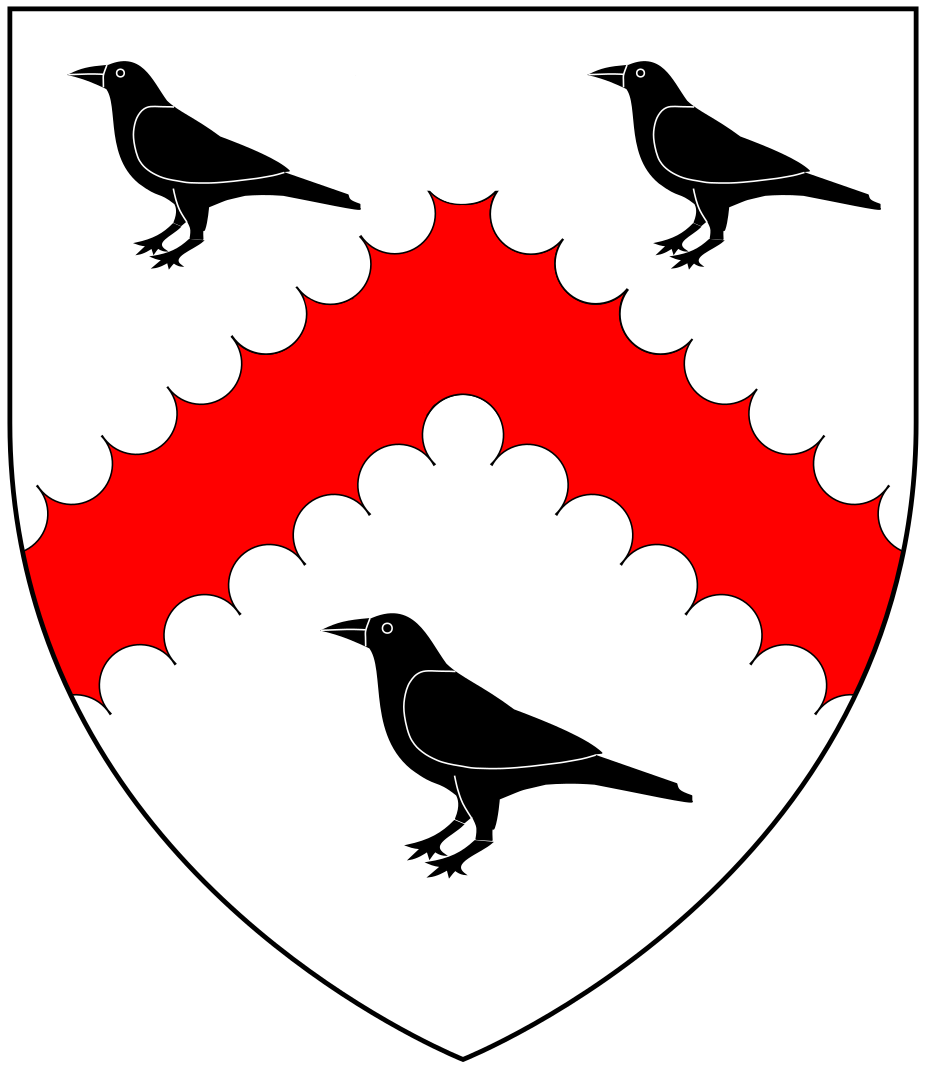
Arms of Croker of Lyneham: Argent, a chevron engrailed gules between three ravens proper

Hele is the earliest known Devonshire seat of the prominent Crocker family, which according to a traditional Devon rhyme:

Crocker, Cruwys, and Copplestone,
When the Conqueror came were all at home

was one of just three Devon families to have a pre-Conquest pedigree – a claim dismissed by W. G. Hoskins as a "hackneyed jingle" with "not a word of truth in it".

Croker's Hele was the seat of William Crocker, living during the reign of King Edward III (1327-1377). He is the earliest member of the family recorded in the Heraldic Visitations of Devon, although one of his ancestors is known to have been Richard Crocker (fl.1335) of Devon, England, a Member of Parliament for Tavistock (UK Parliament constituency) in Devon in 1335.

In the 14th century Croker's Hele was abandoned by John Crocker (William's grandson) in favour of Lyneham in the parish of Yealmpton, Devon, which he had inherited from his wife Alice Gambon, daughter and heiress of John Gambon of Lyneham. The last male of the Crocker family of Lyneham was Courtenay Crocker (died 1740), several times MP for Plympton.

=== Present day ===
Since 2014 Crocker's Hele has contained a solar farm with power capacity of over 1 MW.
