= Francis Rolle =

English lawyer and politician

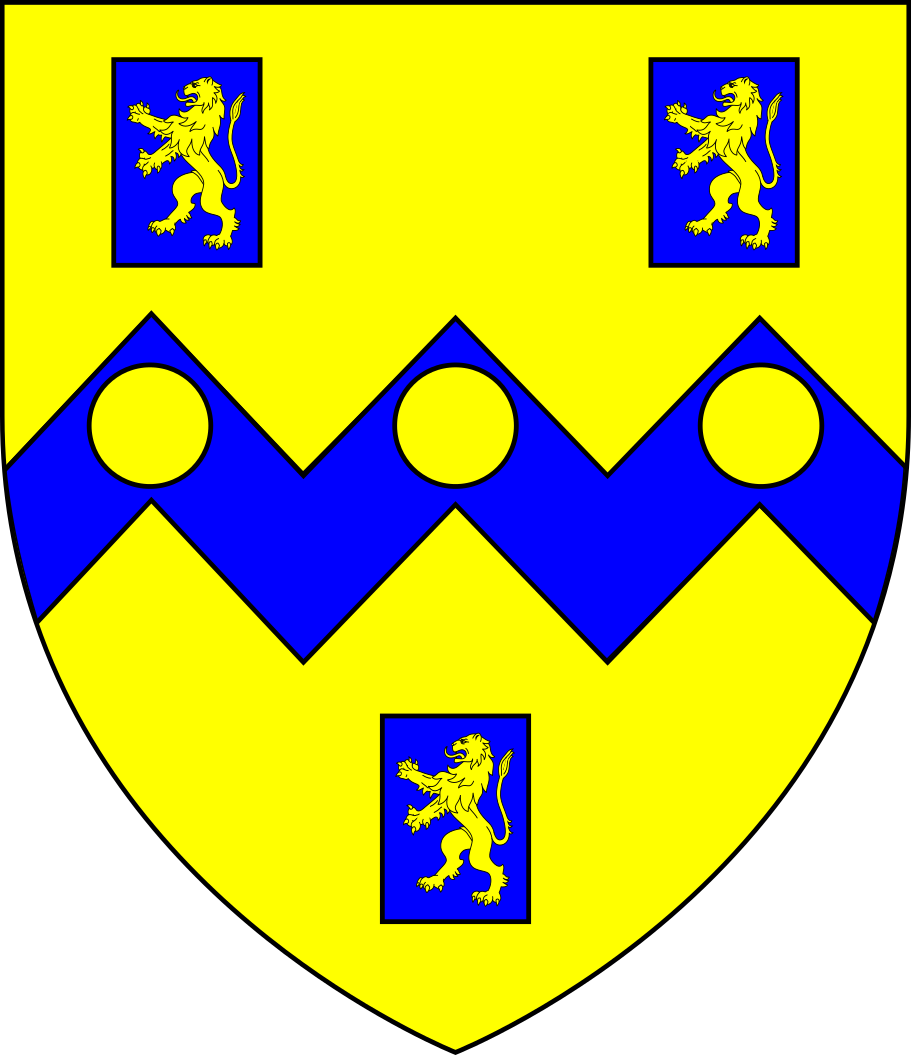
- Arms of Rolle: Or, on a fesse dancetté between three billets azure each charged with a lion rampant of the first three bezants

Member of Parliament for Hampshire
- In office 1675; October 1679 - ?

Member of Parliament for Bridgwater
- In office April 1660 - ? 1669; May - October 1679

High Sheriff of Hampshire
- In office 1664-1665

Member of Parliament for Somerset
- In office 1656

Personal details
- Born: 1630
- Died: 1686 (aged 55–56)
- Spouse: Priscilla Foote (m. 1654)
- Children: 7
- Parent: Henry Rolle (father)
- Relatives: Samuel Rolle (uncle); John Rolle (uncle)
- Education: Emmanuel College, Cambridge

Sir Francis Rolle (1630–1686) was an English lawyer and politician who sat in the House of Commons at various times between 1656 and 1685.

== Early life ==
Rolle was the only son of Henry Rolle of Shapwick in Somerset, who was Chief Justice of the King's Bench and his wife Margaret Bennett. He entered Inner Temple in 1646 and was admitted at Emmanuel College, Cambridge on 25 January 1647. He was called to the bar in 1653.

== Career ==
In 1656, Rolle was elected Member of Parliament for Somerset in the Second Protectorate Parliament. He succeeded his father to the estate at Shapwick in 1656 and became JP for Somerset until July 1660, In 1657 he was commissioner for assessment for Somerset and Hampshire. He was commissioner for militia in 1659 and JP for Hampshire from 1659 to July 1660. He was commissioner for assessment for Somerset and Hampshire from January 1660 to 1680 and commissioner for militia in March 1660. In April 1660 he was elected MP for Bridgwater in the Convention Parliament. He was commissioner for sewers for Somerset in August 1660 and was JP for Somerset from September 1660 to 1680. He was High Sheriff of Hampshire from 1664 to 1665 and was knighted on 1 March 1665. He also became a freeman of Portsmouth in 1665. In 1669 he was briefly MP for Bridgwater again but was removed on petition. He was High Sheriff of Somerset from 1672 to 1673 and was commissioner for inquiry for Finkley forest and for New Forest in 1672. He was commissioner for inquiry for the New Forest again in 1673. In 1675, he was elected MP for Hampshire for the Cavalier Parliament and was made freeman of Winchester 1675. He was commissioner for recusants for Somerset and Hampshire in 1675 and commissioner for inquiry for the New Forest in 1676 and in 1679. In May 1679 he was elected MP for Bridgwater, and in October 1679, he was elected MP for Hampshire. He was elected MP for Hampshire again in 1681. In 1685, he was committed to the Tower of London on 26 June before he could join Monmouth who counted on his support.

=== Death ===
Rolle died at the age of 56 and was buried at East Tytherley in Hampshire on 6 April 1686.

== Personal life ==
Rolle married Priscilla Foote, daughter of Sir Thomas Foote, 1st Baronet of London, on 23 January 1654. They had a son and six daughters. His son John was returned as MP for Bridgwater as a Tory in 1713.

Parliament of England
Preceded by Sir John Horner; John Buckland; General John Desborough; John Preston; John Harrington; John Ashe; Charles Steynings; Robert Long; Richard Jones; Thomas Hippisley; Samuel Perry	Member of Parliament for Somerset; 1656; With: John Buckland; General John Desborough; John Harrington; John Ashe; Robert Long; Alexander Popham; Colonel John Gorges; Sir Lislebone Long; William Wyndham; Francis Luttrell	Succeeded by John Buckland; Robert Hunt
