= William Rolle =

English politician (died 1652)

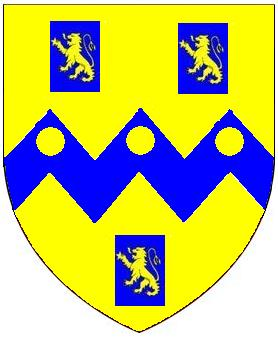
Arms of Rolle: Or, on a fesse dancetté between three billets azure each charged with a lion rampant of the first three bezants

William Rolle (died 1652) was Member of Parliament for Callington in Cornwall in 1604 and 1614.

== Origins ==
He was a younger son of Henry Rolle (died c. 1620,) (3rd son of George Rolle (c. 1486–1552), Keeper of the Records of the Court of Common Pleas and MP for Barnstaple in 1542 and 1545, of Stevenstone near Great Torrington, Devon) by his wife Margaret Yeo, daughter and heiress of Robert Yeo of Heanton Satchville, Petrockstowe, in Devon, situated about 5 1/2 miles south-west of Stevenstone.

== Career ==
His known career appears to have been entirely dependent on the patronage of his eldest brother Robert Rolle (died 1633) of Heanton Satchville, who nominated him to his pocket borough seat of Callington. In 1601 Robert had purchased the manor of Callington in Cornwall, thereby gaining the pocket borough seat, which in future served to promote the careers of many Rolles. Robert nominated to this seat not only his brother William Rolle in 1604 and 1614, but also his own son Sir Henry Rolle (1589–1656), of Shapwick, in 1620 and 1624 (Chief Justice of the King's Bench and also MP for Truro, Cornwall (1625- 1629)), his son Samuel's father-in-law Thomas Wise (died March 1641) of Sydenham in Devon, in 1625, and another son John Rolle (1598–1648), in 1626 and 1628 (a Turkey Merchant and also MP for Truro, a Parliamentarian in the English Civil War).
