= William Crocker =

William Crocker may refer to:

- William Crocker (of Devon), a 14th-century English Member of Parliament
- William Henry Crocker (1861–1937), American banker and member of the Republican Party
- William L. Crocker Jr., American politician and journalist
- William Maunder Crocker (1843–1899), administrator in Borneo
