= William Crocker (of Devon) =

14th-century English politician

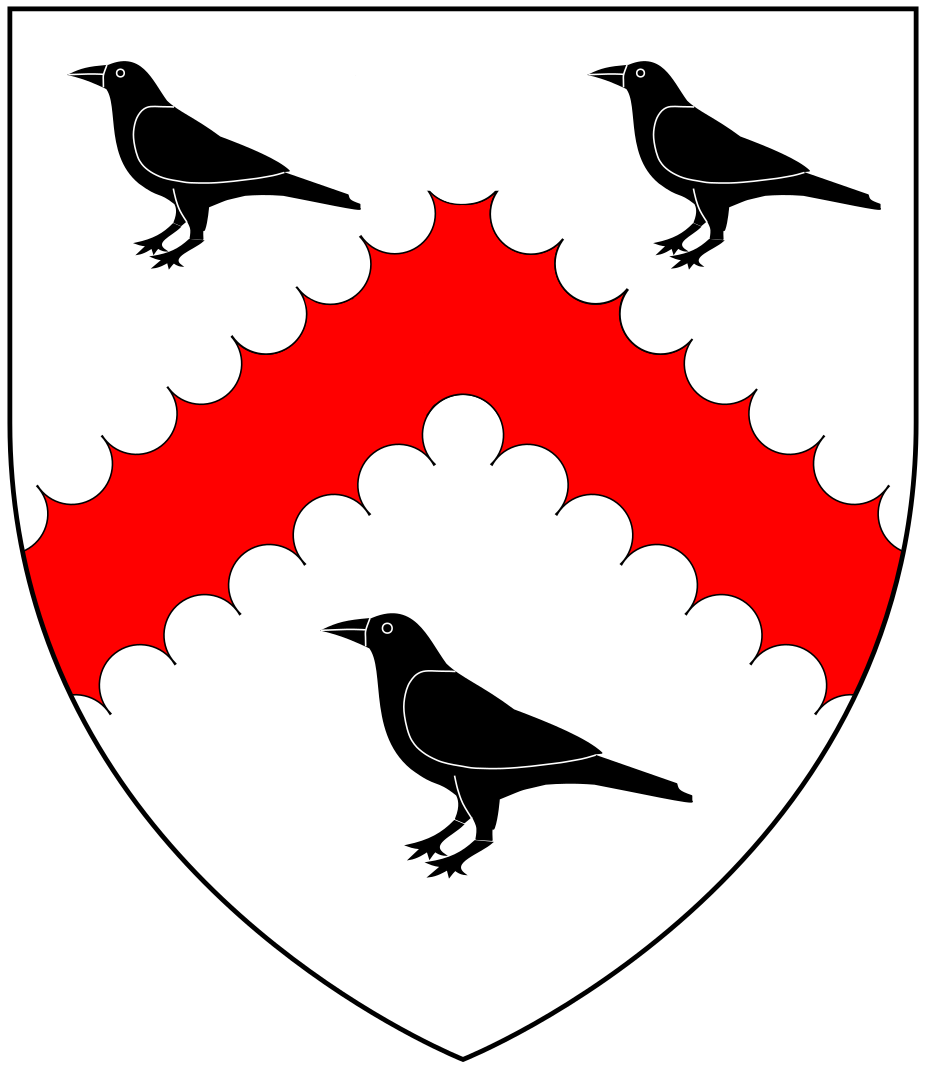
Canting arms of Croker of Lyneham: Argent, a chevron engrailed gules between three crows proper

William Crocker (fl. 14th c.), living during the reign of King Edward III (1327-1377), of Crocker's Hele in the parish of Meeth, Devon, was a Member of Parliament.

== Family origins ==
The Crocker family is believed to be one of the most ancient in Devon, reputedly of Anglo-Saxon origin, very rare for English gentry who mostly descend from Norman invaders who took part in the Norman Conquest of 1066. According to "that old saw often used among us in discourse", the traditional rhyme related by Prince (d.1723):

"Crocker, Cruwys, and Coplestone,
When the Conqueror came were at home"

== Descendants ==
His descendants were the prominent Crocker family seated at Lyneham in the parish of Yealmpton, Devon until 1740. William Crocker is the earliest member of the family recorded in the Heraldic Visitations of Devon, although one of his ancestors is known to have been Richard Crocker (fl.1335) of Devon, England, a Member of Parliament for Tavistock (UK Parliament constituency) in Devon in 1335.

The earliest known Devonshire seat of the Crocker family was Crocker's Hele, in the parish of Meeth, (in 2016 a 7-acre solar farm) which in the 14th century was abandoned by William's grandson John II Crocker in favour of Lyneham in the parish of Yealmpton, Devon, which he had inherited from his wife Alice Gambon, daughter and heiress of John Gambon of Lyneham. The last male of the Crocker family of Lyneham was Courtenay Crocker (d.1740), several times MP for Plympton.
