= Richard Crocker (of Devon) =

14th-century English politician

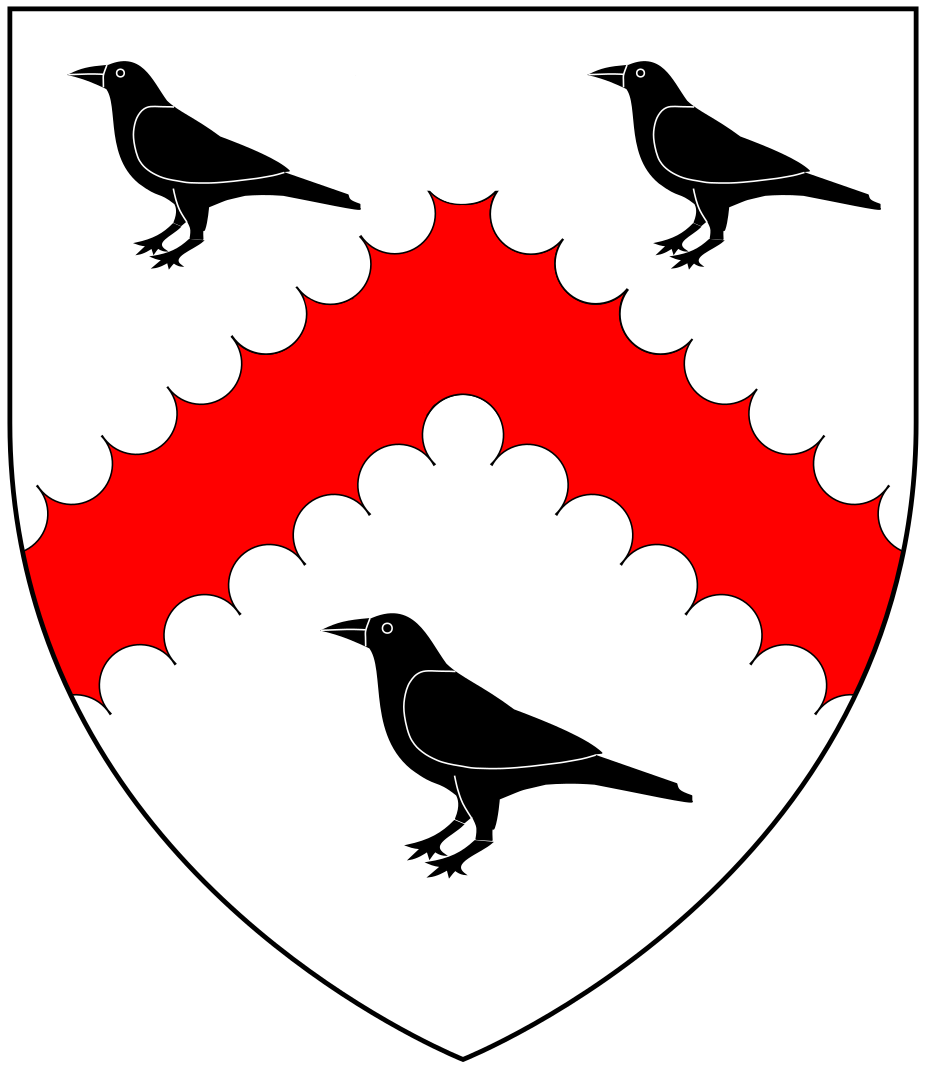
Canting arms of Croker of Lyneham: Argent, a chevron engrailed gules between three crows proper

Richard Crocker (fl. 1335) of Devon, England, was a Member of Parliament for Tavistock in Devon in 1335. His descendants were the prominent Crocker family of Crocker's Hele in the parish of Meeth, Devon, later seated at Lyneham in the parish of Yealmpton, Devon until 1740.

The earliest known Devonshire seat of the Crocker family was Crocker's Hele, in the parish of Meeth. Richard's descendant William Crocker (fl. 14th c.), living during the reign of King Edward III (1327-1377), of Crocker's Hele was a Member of Parliament and is the earliest member of the family recorded in the Heraldic Visitations of Devon. William's descendants were the prominent Crocker family seated at Lyneham in the parish of Yealmpton, Devon until 1740. Crocker's Hele was abandoned in the 14th century by John II Crocker in favour of Lyneham in the parish of Yealmpton, Devon, which he had inherited from his wife Alice Gambon, daughter and heiress of John Gambon of Lyneham.

The Crocker family is believed to be one of the most ancient in Devon, reputedly of Anglo-Saxon origin, very rare for English gentry who mostly descend from Norman invaders who took part in the Norman Conquest of 1066. According to "that old saw often used among us in discourse", the traditional rhyme related by Prince (d. 1723):

"Crocker, Cruwys, and Coplestone,
When the Conqueror came were at home"

The last male of the Crocker family of Lyneham was Courtenay Crocker (d.1740), several times MP for Plympton. The Cruwys family in 2014 still resides in its ancient manor house at Cruwys Morchard where, despite the traditional rhyme which seeks to give it Anglo-Saxon origins, it is first recorded in the reign of King John (1199-1216), or possibly a little earlier. The senior branch of the Copleston family died out in the male line in 1632, but the Coplestons of Bowden in the parish of Ashprington survived a further century until the death without progeny of Thomas Copleston (1688-1748), MP, whose heirs in 1753 sold Bowden to William Pollexfen Bastard of Kitley.
