= Henry Rolle =

Chief justice, MP for Cornwall (1589–1656)

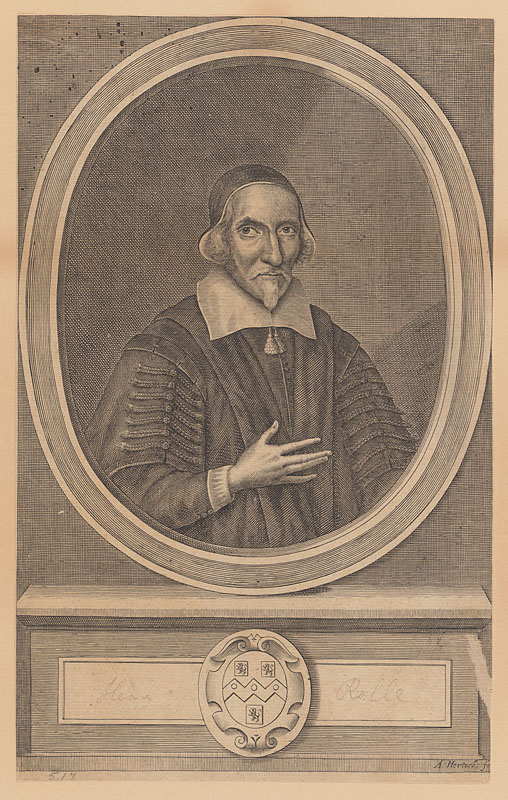
- Sir Henry Rolle (1589–1656) Chief Justice of the King's Bench. Engraving from preface of Rolle's Abridgment (1668)

Member of the English Council of State
- In office 13 February 1649 - ?

Lord Chief Justice of England and Wales
- In office 15 November 1648 - ?

Judge in the Court of King's Bench
- In office 28 October 1645 - 15 November 1648

Member of Parliament for Truro
- In office 1625-1629
- Monarch: James I

Member of Parliament for Callington
- In office 1620-1624
- Monarch: Charles I

Personal details
- Born: c. 1589 England
- Died: 30 July 1656 (aged 66–67)
- Spouse: Margaret Bennett
- Children: 1, Francis
- Relatives: Samuel Rolle (brother); John Rolle (brother)
- Education: Exeter College, Oxford

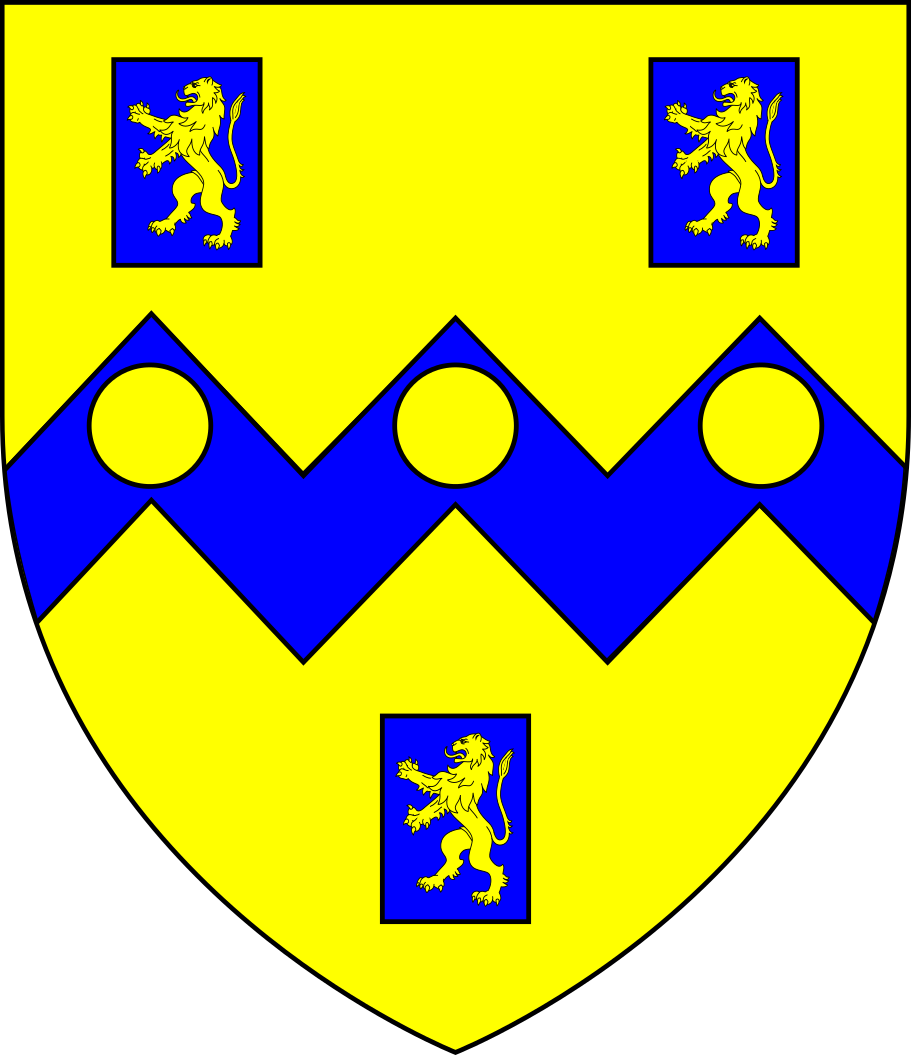
Arms of Rolle: Or, on a fesse dancetté between three billets azure each charged with a lion rampant of the first three bezants

Sir Henry Rolle (c. 1589–1656), of Shapwick in Somerset, was Chief Justice of the King's Bench and served as MP for Callington, Cornwall, (1614–1623–4) and for Truro, Cornwall (1625–1629).

== Origins ==
Henry Rolle was born circa 1589, the second son of Robert Rolle (d. 1633) of Heanton Satchville in the parish of Petrockstowe, Devon, by his wife Joan Hele, daughter of Thomas Hele of Fleet, Devon. Henry was a great-grandson, in a junior line, of George Rolle (c.1486-1552) of Stevenstone, Devon, founder of the influential and wealthy Rolle family of Devon, Keeper of the Records of the Court of Common Pleas and MP for Barnstaple in 1542 and 1545. His brothers included:

- Sir Samuel I Rolle (c.1588-1647) (eldest brother) of Heanton Satchville, Member of Parliament for Callington, Cornwall in 1640 and for Devon 1641-1647 and a supporter of the parliamentary side in the Civil War.
- John Rolle (1598–1648) (younger brother) a Turkey Merchant and MP for Callington, Cornwall, in 1626 and 1628 and for Truro, Cornwall, in 1640 for the Short Parliament and in November 1640 for the Long Parliament. A supporter of the Parliamentarian side in the English Civil War

== Early legal career ==
He matriculated at Exeter College, Oxford on 20 March 1607, (Note: Julian calendar with the start of year adjusted to 1 January (see Old Style and New Style dates)) and was admitted on 1 February 1609 to the Inner Temple, where he was called to the bar in 1618. He was elected bencher in 1633 and reader in 1637 and 1638, but owing to the prevalence of the plague, did not give his reading until the Lent of 1639.

Among his contemporaries at the Inner Temple and his intimate friends were Sir Edward Littleton (1589–1645), afterwards lord keeper and created Baron Littleton; Sir Edward Herbert, afterwards attorney-general; Sir Thomas Gardiner, afterwards recorder of London; and John Selden, by whose conversation and friendly rivalry he profited in the study of the law and humane learning. Rolle practised with eminent success in the Court of King's Bench. He was appointed recorder of Dorchester in 1636, and was called to the degree of serjeant-at-law on 10 May 1640.

== Political career ==
He served as MP for Callington, in Cornwall, between 1620 and 1624, during the last two parliaments of King James I (1603-1625), and for Truro between 1625 and 1629 in the first three parliaments of his successor King Charles I (1625-1649). He early identified himself with the popular party and was unsurpassed by any other member in his vigour to effect the impeachment of George Villiers, 1st Duke of Buckingham. He was likewise insistent that supply should be postponed to the redress of grievances. On the outbreak of the Civil War he took the side of Parliament, contributed £100 to the defence fund, and took the Covenant.

== Judicial career ==
His advancement to a judgeship in the Court of King's Bench was one of the stipulations included in the propositions for peace of January 1642–43. On 28 October 1645, he was sworn in as such, and on 15 November 1648, further to votes of both houses of parliament, he was advanced to Lord Chief Justice of England and Wales, otherwise known as Lord Chief Justice of the King's Bench. About a week after the execution of King Charles I in 1649, he accepted on 8 February 1649, a new commission as Lord Chief Justice of the upper bench on the understanding that no change should be made to the fundamental laws of the kingdom.

On 13 February 1649, he was voted a member of the Council of State, which appointment strengthened the government, and his presence on the western circuit contributed much to the settlement of the public mind. In 1650 he tried the case of William Franklin and Mary Gadbury. The two them had been asserting that William was Jesus Christ come to earth in a new body. They had been tried in Winchester and they had recanted their claims. The same happened again and as before Gadbury was given correction to persuade her to make her mark. They were both released within weeks and never heard from again although one disgraced minister mentioned him in 1666.

On 4 August 1654 Rolle was appointed Commissioner of the Exchequer. Rolle was exceeded in his abilities as advocate or judge by none of his contemporaries save by the great Sir Matthew Hale.

His decisions, reported by William Style, rarely relate to matters of historic interest. Nevertheless, he established, in the case of Captain Streater, committed to prison by order of the Council of State and the Speaker of the House of Commons for the publication of seditious writings, the principle that a court of justice cannot review parliamentary commitments if regular in form.

== Case of Don Pantaleone Sá ==
Rolle's name is associated with a cause célèbre of international law. Don Pantaleone Sá, a brother of the Portuguese ambassador, was arrested for a murder committed in an affray in the New Exchange in the Strand, London. The fact was undeniable, but the Don claimed the privilege of exterritoriality, due to his being a member of the Ambassador's household. The point was discussed by Rolle in consultation with two of his puisne judges, two admiralty judges and two civilians, and on 16 January 1654 was decided against the Don. The decision was without precedent, for it could neither be denied that the Don was of the household of the ambassador, nor that the privilege of exterritoriality had theretofore been understood to extend even to cases of murder. At the trial on 6 July 1654, over which Rolle presided, the prisoner was conceded a jury, half English half Portuguese, but was denied the assistance of counsel and was compelled to waive his privilege and plead to the indictment by a threat of peine forte et dure. He was found guilty and sentenced to death by hanging. The execution was carried out on Tower Hill on 10 July 1654.

On the outbreak of the Penruddock uprising on 12 March 1654–5, Rolle was at Salisbury on assize business, when he was surprised by the cavaliers under Sir Joseph Wagstaffe, who coolly proposed to hang him. At Penruddock's intercession, however, he was released.

== Resignation ==
He served as one of the commissioners for the trial of the insurgents at Exeter in May 1655, and being unable to decide against the merchant George Cony, who had sued a customs officer for levying duty from him by force without authority of parliament, and rather than give further offence to the Lord Protector Oliver Cromwell he resigned on 7 June 1655. He was succeeded by Sir John Glynne.

== Death and burial ==
He died on 30 July 1656 and was buried in the parish church of his manor of Shapwick, near Glastonbury, in Somerset.

== Publications ==
While engaged in the practice of law Rolle spent much of his leisure in making reports and abridgments of cases. His Abridgment des plusieurs Cases et Resolutions del Commun Ley, known as Rolle's Abridgment, was published in London in 1668 as two volumes folio. The preface includes an engraving of his portrait and is followed by a memoir by Sir Matthew Hale in which he is characterised as "a person of great learning and experience in the common law, profound judgment, singular prudence, great moderation, justice, and integrity". His Reports de divers Cases en le Court del Banke le Roy en le Temps del Reign de Roy Jacques, appeared in print in London in 1675–6, in two volumes folio.

== Lands acquired ==
Rolle acquired the following manors:

- Wookey, Somerset, purchased for £3,500 in 1626.
- Shapwick in Somerset, purchased in 1630, where he re-built the manor house.
- East Tytherley in Hampshire, purchased in 1654

== Marriage and children ==
Rolle married Margaret Bennett. They had only one son:

- Sir Francis Rolle, who was knighted at Portsmouth on 1 March 1665 and was lord of the manor of East Tytherley in Hampshire, which county he represented in the parliament of 1681.

== Sources ==
- Handley, Stuart (2008). "Rolle, Henry (1589/90–1656)". Oxford Dictionary of National Biography (online ed.). Oxford University Press. doi:10.1093/ref:odnb/24021. (Subscription, Wikipedia Library access or UK public library membership required.)
- Porter, Stephen (2004). "Gerard, John (1632–1654)". Oxford Dictionary of National Biography (online ed.). Oxford University Press. doi:10.1093/ref:odnb/10557. (Subscription, Wikipedia Library access or UK public library membership required.)
- Vivian, Lt.Col. J.L., (Ed.) The Visitations of the County of Devon: Comprising the Heralds' Visitations of 1531, 1564 & 1620, Exeter, 1895, p. 654, pedigree of Rolle

Attribution

- This article incorporates text from a publication now in the public domain: Rigg, James McMullen (1897). "Rolle, Henry". In Lee, Sidney (ed.). Dictionary of National Biography. Vol. 49. London: Smith, Elder & Co. pp. 162–163.
