= Lyneham, Yealmpton =

Historic estate in Devon, England

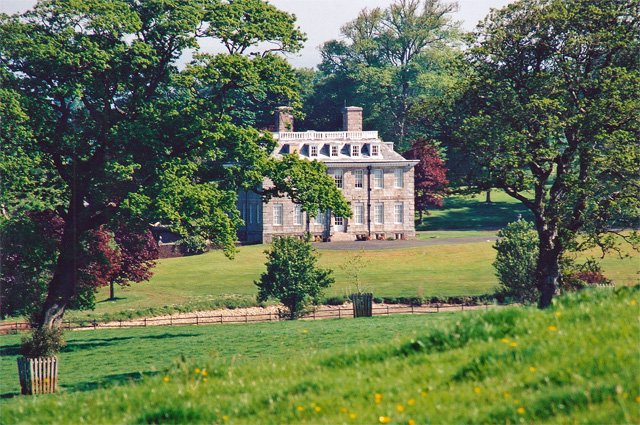
Lyneham House, Yealmpton, built c.1699-1703 by Sir Courtenay Croker (died 1740), MP

Lyneham in the parish of Yealmpton in Devon, is an historic estate. The surviving grand mansion house known as Lyneham House is a grade I listed building. It was built c.1699-1703 by Sir Courtenay Croker (died 1740), MP for Plympton Morice in 1699. A drawing of Lyneham House dated 1716 by Edmund Prideaux (1693–1745) of Prideaux Place, Padstow, Cornwall, survives at Prideaux Place. It shows formal gardens in front with flanking pavilions and an orangery.

The estate was, after Crocker's Hele, in the parish of Meeth, the second earliest known Devonshire home of the Croker family, one of the most ancient in Devon according to "that old saw often used among us in discourse", the traditional rhyme related by Prince (died 1723):

"Crocker, Cruwys, and Coplestone,
When the Conqueror came were at home"

The last male of the Crocker family of Lyneham was Courtenay Crocker (died 1740), several times MP for Plympton. The Cruwys family in 2014 still resides in its ancient manor house at Cruwys Morchard where, despite the traditional rhyme which seeks to give it Anglo-Saxon origins, it is first recorded in the reign of King John (1199–1216), or possibly a little earlier. The senior branch of the Copleston family died out in the male line in 1632, but the Coplestons of Bowden in the parish of Ashprington survived a further century until the death without children of Thomas Copleston (1688–1748), MP, whose heirs in 1753 sold Bowden to William Pollexfen Bastard of Kitley.

== Descent ==
=== de Lineham ===
Lynham is not listed as an estate or manor in the Domesday Book of 1086, which does however list the manor of Yealmpton, one of 72 royal manors or other holdings in Devon belonging to King William the Conqueror. It is likely that the one hide within that manor which the Domesday Book states the king had granted in frankalmoinage to "the clergy of the same village" (clerici ei(us)d(em) villae) was Lynham. The mother church of these clergy was Salisbury Cathedral in Wiltshire.

The de Lineham family, as was usual, took their surname from their seat. Raph de Lineham lived at Lyneham during the reign of King John (1199–1216) He was followed by Walter de Lineham, Richard de Lineham (living in 1272), Dion de Lineham (living in 1314), John de Lineham and his son Walter de Lineham (both living in 1340).

=== Topcliff ===
In 1374 Lyneham was the residence of Robert Topcliff, who was followed by his son Thomas Topcliff.

=== Croker ===
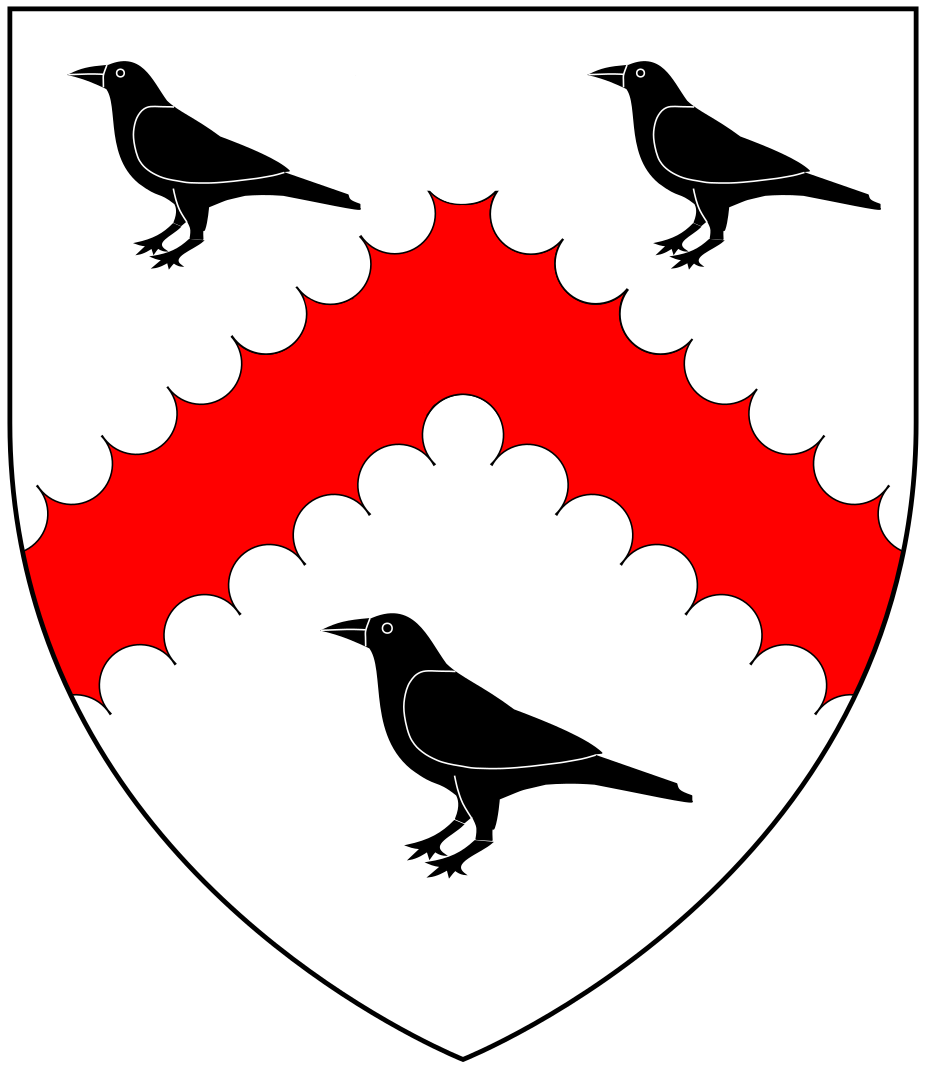
Canting arms of Croker of Lyneham: Argent, a chevron engrailed gules between three crows proper

John Croker of Lyneham (son of John Croker of Hele (now "Crocker's Hele", a 7-acre solar farm)in the parish of Meeth, Devon, MP for Tavistock in 1394 and Portreve of Tavistock, son of William Crocker, MP, of Hele, living during the reign of King Edward III (the earliest member of the family recorded in the Heraldic Visitations of Devon.)) is the first member of the Croker family to be seated at Lyneham. John Croker married Alice Gambon, daughter and heiress of John Gambon of Lyneham, and thus acquired that estate.

He was followed by his son John Croker, who was followed by his son Sir John Croker (died 1508), a Member of Parliament for Devon in 1491 (whose inscribed monumental brass showing him dressed in armour survives in Yealmpton Church) who married twice, firstly to Elizabeth Yeo, a daughter of Robert Yeo of Heanton Satchville, Petrockstowe, secondly to Elizabeth Fortescue, daughter of Sir Richard Fortescue and widow of a certain Elliott. He was followed by his son John Croker, by his first wife Elizabeth Yeo. This John Croker married twice, firstly to Jone Arundell, daughter of Humphry Arundell of "Selley", without children, and secondly to Elizabeth Pollard, a daughter of Sir Lewis Pollard (c. 1465 – 1526) of Grilstone in the parish of Bishop's Nympton, a Justice of the Common Pleas and Member of Parliament for Totnes. She survived him and remarried to Sir Hugh Trevanion.

He was followed by another John Croker (the sixth, who died in 1560), his son by Elizabeth Pollard, who married Elizabeth Strode, a daughter of Richard Strode (died 1552) of Newnham in the parish of Plympton St Mary, who in 1538 following the Dissolution of the Monasteries purchased the demesne lands of Plympton Priory, the second wealthiest monastery in Devon. His son was the seventh John Croker (1652–1614) who married Agnes Servington, daughter of John Servington of Tavistock. His son was Hugh Croker (died before 1614), who pre-deceased his father, having married Agnes Bonville, only daughter and heiress of Richard Bonville of Modbury, a descendant of John Bonville (died 1491), lord of the manor of Combe Raleigh, Devon, and bastard son of the magnate William Bonville, 1st Baron Bonville (died 1461). His son was John Croker (born 1589), heir to his grandfather, the seventh John Croker. He married a member of the Lee family. His son was also named John (1610–1633/4), who died unmarried and predeceased his father.

==== John Croker (fl.1657) ====
The next heir was another John Croker, the son of Francis Croker of Lyneham (heir to his brother John Croker of Lyneham). In 1657 he married Jane Pole (born 1625), 4th daughter of Sir John Pole, 1st Baronet (died 1658) of Shute and Bromley St Leonard, Middlesex, and sister of Sir Courtenay Pole, 2nd Baronet. Mary Pole, the eldest daughter of Sir John Pole, 1st Baronet, and aunt of Sir Courtenay Pole, 2nd Baronet, in 1606 married (as her second husband) Francis Courtenay (1576–1638), de jure 4th Earl of Devon, lord of the manor of Powderham, but produced no children. There was no immediate blood connection to the Courtenay family which could be claimed by either the Poles or Crokers, and this connection to Francis Courtenay seemingly accounts for the adoption of the first name "Courtenay" in the Pole, Croker and Bulteel families. The first name "Courtenay" was commonly adopted amongst the Devonshire gentry, but usually as a result of descent from a Courtenay daughter.

==== Sir Courtenay Croker (died 1740) ====
The son of this marriage was Sir Courtenay Croker (1660–1740), MP for Plympton Morice (1695–1702) (alias Plympton Erle) and the "last male of the name". The first name Courtenay was often adopted by descendants via a female line of the prominent Courtenay family lords of the manor of Powderham in Devon, a junior line of the extinct Courtenay Earls of Devon of Tiverton Castle. However neither Croker himself nor his uncle Sir Courtenay Pole, 2nd Baronet, could claim this distinction. In 1699 Prince reported that:

As to the present seat of the family, Lineham aforesaid, it is an antient house, which being grown weak and descript thro’ age, is now a repairing, or rather rebuilding, by the present possessor, Courtenay Crocker aforementioned, who is a justice of peace for the county, and a burgess of parliament, this present year 1699, for the burrough of Plimton Morice, in this shire

The house he built survives largely intact today. Sir Courtenay Croker married twice: firstly on about 1691 to Catharine Hillersdon, daughter and co-heiress of Richard Hillersdon of Membland in the parish of Holbeton, by whom he had one daughter and sole heiress Mary Croker, wife of James Bulteel. Secondly in 1696 he married Katherine Tucker, a daughter and co-heiress of John Tucker of Exeter, without children. He died in 1740 with no sons, when his only daughter Mary Croker (who in 1718 had married James Bulteel (1676–1757), since 1716 lord of the manor of Flete, Holbeton, MP for Tavistock) became his sole heiress.

=== Bulteel ===
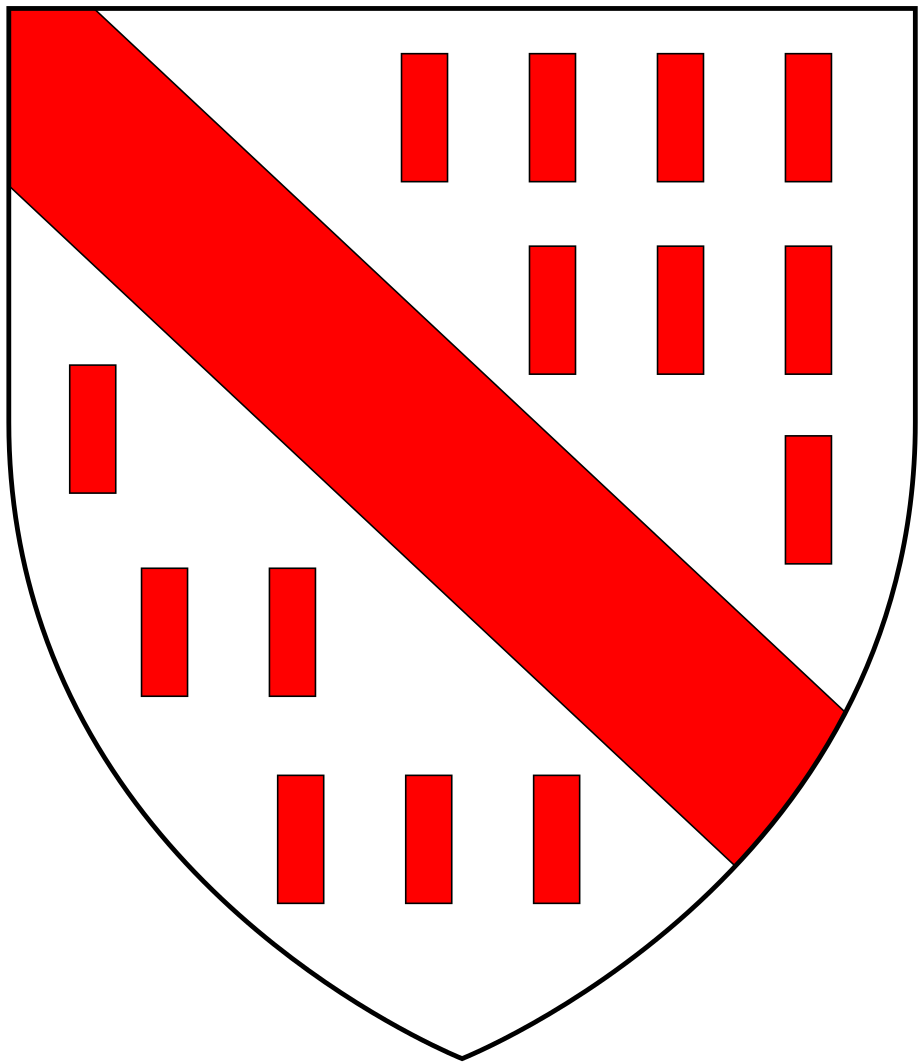
Arms of Bulteel: Argent biletée gules, a bend of the last

John Bulteel (died 1669) of Westminster, who died unmarried, served twice as a Member of Parliament for Lostwithiel in Cornwall, from 1661 to 1669. Between c.1658 and 1667 he was Secretary to Edward Hyde, 1st Earl of Clarendon, Lord Chancellor to King Charles II from 1658, two years before the Restoration of the Monarchy, until 1667. In 1660 the Garter King of Arms confirmed to him the right to bear arms as follows: Argent semy of billets and a bend gules, with crest: Out of a crowne gules two wings argent billetté of the first. This family descended from James Bulteel of Tournay in Hainault. These are the same arms as are visible in Holbeton Church on Bulteel monuments. Samuel Bulteel of Sligo, Ireland (Collector of Sligo in 1792, a cousin of Admiral Rowley Bulteel of Mount Pleasant near Plymouth), wrote as follows in about 1820:

Three brothers, James, Dominick and Samuel Bulteel were obliged to fly from Tourney in French Flanders during the persecutions of the Protestants. They came for refuge to England about the latter end of the reign of Queen Elizabeth. James settled in Tavistock in Devonshire. Dominick was in priest's orders, and died without issue. Samuel settled at Plymouth. Some part of his issue went to Ireland and settled there and had issue.

The pedigree of Bulteel printed in Burke's Landed Gentry commences with Samuel Bulteel (died 1682) of Tavistock in Devon, a Huguenot refugee from France, whose son was James Bulteel (1676–1757) of Tavistock, MP for Tavistock 1703-8 and 1711–15, who married Mary Crocker, daughter and heiress of Courtenay Crocker (died 1740), of Lyneham. He was followed by John Bulteel (1733–1801). The son of John Bulteel (died 1801) was John Bulteel (1763–1837) of Flete in the parish of Holbeton and of Lyneham, Sheriff of Devon in 1807/8. He married Elizabeth Perring (died 1835), whose monument survives in the chancel of All Saints Church, Holbeton, daughter of Thomas Perring (1732–1791), a merchant of Modbury in Devon and of London.

John Bulteel (died 1837) was followed by his son John Crocker Bulteel (1793–1843) of Fleet, Holbeton, in South Devon, a Whig MP for South Devon 1832-4 and Sheriff of Devon in 1841. He was Master of the Dartmoor Foxhounds and bred the finest pack of hounds in England. In 1850 Lyneham was being used as a "farmhouse", occupied by a farmer tenant of Lady Bulteel.

=== Bastard ===
In 1902 Lyneham was the residence of William Edmund Pollexfen Bastard, JP, a member of the Bastard family long seated at Kitley, in the same parish of Yealmpton. Lyneham was sold by Captain John Bastard on 15 October 1962.

=== Later owners ===
==== Cadbury ====
Lyneham was briefly owned by Peter Cadbury (1918–2006), a member of the Quaker chocolate-making dynasty and founder of Westward Television. He sold his previous home, Preston Candover in Hampshire, to John Sainsbury, 1st Baron Sainsbury "of Preston Candover" and purchased Lyneham. He soon sold it, and moved to Upton Grey Lodge in Hampshire, stating that "police harassment had made his life there intolerable". This related to his having "developed a particularly fierce animosity" towards the chief constable of Devon and Cornwall, whose appearances on Westward Television news programmes he had tried to censor. He also got into difficulties with that police force when he was charged with wasting police time in connection with an anonymous letter alleging local authority corruption in Plymouth, and for shooting a protected species of goose.

==== Harvey ====
Since 1996 Lyneham has been owned by Susan Mary McAlpine (born 1945) (Mrs Harvey), wife of Leonard Maxwell Harvey, and daughter of Malcolm Donnison McAlpine (1909–1982), a grandson of Sir Robert McAlpine, 1st Baronet, founder of the British construction company Sir Robert McAlpine. She has a game bird shoot on the estate.

== Sources ==
- Cherry, Bridget; Pevsner, Nikolaus (1989). The Buildings of England: Devon (second ed.). Penguin Books. ISBN 0-14-071050-7.
- Hoskins, W.G., A New Survey of England: Devon, London, 1959 (first published 1954)
- Pole, Sir William (died 1635), Collections Towards a Description of the County of Devon, Sir John-William de la Pole (ed.), London, 1791.
- Prince, John, (1643–1723) The Worthies of Devon, 1810 edition.
- Risdon, Tristram (died 1640), Survey of Devon, 1811 edition, London, 1811, with 1810 Additions.
- Thorn, Caroline & Frank, (eds.) Domesday Book, (Morris, John, gen.ed.) Vol. 9, Devon, Parts 1 & 2, Phillimore Press, Chichester, 1985
- Vivian, J.L., ed. (1895). The Visitations of the County of Devon, Comprising the Heralds' Visitations of 1531, 1564, & 1620. With additions by Lieutenant-Colonel J. L. Vivian. Exeter: Henry S. Eland.
