= Richard Crocker =

Richard Crocker may refer to:

- Richard Crocker (musicologist) (1927–2021), American musicologist
- Richard Crocker (of Devon) (fl. 1335), English politician
