= Samuel Rolle (died 1647) =

English MP

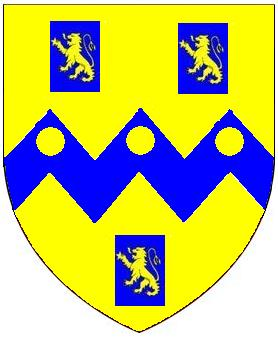
- Arms of Rolle: Or, on a fesse dancetté between three billets azure each charged with a lion rampant of the first three bezants

Member of Parliament for Devon
- In office 1641–1647

Member of Parliament for Callington
- In office 1640

Personal details
- Born: c. 1588
- Died: Late 1647 (aged 58–59)
- Spouse(s): Mary Stradling (d. 1613); Margaret Wise; Miss Carew
- Children: 3+, including Robert
- Relatives: Henry Rolle (brother); John Rolle (brother)
- Military career
- Allegiance: Parliamentarians
- Commands: Devon Trained Bands
- Conflicts: English Civil War

Sir Samuel Rolle (c. 1588 – 1647) of Heanton Satchville in the parish of Petrockstowe, Devon, served as Member of Parliament for Callington, Cornwall in 1640 and for Devon 1641–1647. He supported the parliamentary side in the Civil War.

== Origins ==
Rolle was born c. 1588, the eldest son and heir of Robert Rolle (died 1633) of Heanton Satchville in the parish of Petrockstowe, Devon, by his wife Joan Hele, daughter of Thomas Hele of Fleet, Devon. Samuel was a great-grandson, in a junior line, of George Rolle (c. 1486 – 1552) of Stevenstone, Devon, founder of the influential and wealthy Rolle family of Devon, Keeper of the Records of the Court of Common Pleas and MP for Barnstaple in 1542 and 1545.

Samuel's brothers included Sir Henry Rolle (1589–1656), of Shapwick in Somerset, Chief Justice of the King's Bench and MP; and John Rolle (1598–1648) a Turkey Merchant and MP.

== Career ==
In April 1640 Rolle was elected Member of Parliament for Callington in the Short Parliament. In 1641 he was elected MP for Devon in the Long Parliament where he remained until his death in 1647. During the First English Civil War he commanded a regiment of the Devon Trained Bands for Parliament until the surrender of Barnstaple in 1643.

== Lands acquired ==
In 1634, he and his brother Henry Rolle, and their brother-in-law Hugh Fortescue of Filleigh purchased an estate at Bawdrip.

== Marriage and children ==
Rolle married three times. His first wife was Mary Stradling (died 1613), a daughter and co-heiress of Sir Edward Stradling of St George's, Somerset (a member of the Stradling family of St Donat's Castle, Glamorgan, Wales). Her monumental brass survives in the parish church of St Stephens by Saltash, Cornwall. By her Rolle had two children, Samuel and Rebecca, who both died as infants and were buried at Launceston, Cornwall.

His second marriage was to Margaret Wise, daughter of Sir Thomas Wise (died 1629), builder of Sydenham House, in the parish of Marystow, Devon. By Margaret he had children including his son and heir, Robert Rolle (died 1660), MP.

Thirdly he married a daughter from the Carew family, of unknown name.

== Brass of Marie Stradling ==
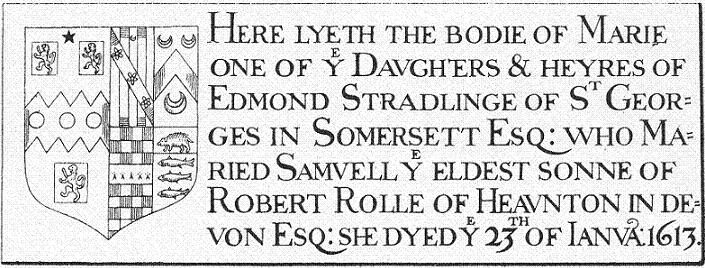
Monumental brass to Marie Stradling, Rolle's first wife. Church of St Stephens by Saltash, Cornwall

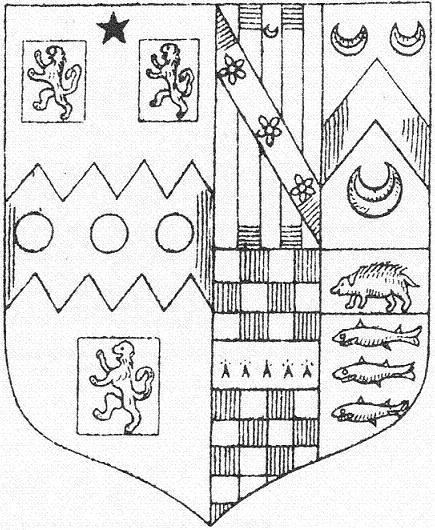
Detail from the Marie Stradling brass

A monumental brass to Rolle's first wife, Marie Stradling, survives in the parish church of St Stephen-by-Saltash, Cornwall, affixed to the wall at the east end of the north aisle, formerly on the floor by the altar. The inscription reads:

Here lyeth the bodie of Marie one of ye daughters & heyres of Edmond Stradlinge of St Georges in Somersett Esq. who maried Samuell ye eldest sonne of Robert Rolle of Heaunton in Devon Esq. She dyed yr 23th of Janua. 1613.

The arms depicted are: Or, on a fesse dancetté between three billets azure each charged with a lion rampant of the first three bezants a mullet for difference (Rolle) impaling quarterly 1: Paly of six (shown here incorrectly as five) argent and azure on a bend gules three cinquefoils or (Stradling); 2: Azure, a chevron between three crescents or (Berkerolles of Coity Castle, Glamorgan; 3: Chequy...and...afess ermine (Turberville of Coity Castle); 4: ...three fishes niant in pale...on a chief a hedgehog (?).

== Death and burial ==
Samuel Rolle died and was buried 7 December 1647 at Petrockstowe.

== Sources ==
- Vivian, Lt.Col. J.L., (Ed.) The Visitations of the County of Devon: Comprising the Heralds' Visitations of 1531, 1564 & 1620, Exeter, 1895, pp. 652–656, pedigree of Rolle

Parliament of England
Vacant Parliament suspended since 1629	Member of Parliament for Callington; 1640; With: Thomas Gardiner	Succeeded by Sir Arthur Ingram; George Fane
Preceded by Edward Seymour; Thomas Wyse	Member of Parliament for Devon; 1641–1647; With: Edward Seymour 1641–1643; Sir Nicholas Martyn 1646–1647	Succeeded by William Morice; Sir Nicholas Martyn
