= John Rolle (Cornwall MP, born 1598) =

British merchant and politician

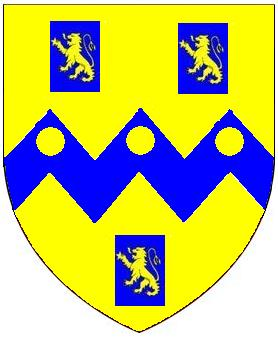
- Arms of Rolle: Or, on a fesse dancetté between three billets azure each charged with a lion rampant of the first three bezants

Member of Parliament for Truro
- In office 1640-?

Member of Parliament for Callington
- In office 1625–1629

Personal details
- Born: 1598 England
- Died: 1648 (aged 49–50)
- Relatives: Samuel Rolle (brother); Henry Rolle (brother)

John Rolle (1598–1648) was a Turkey Merchant and also served as MP for the Rolle family's controlled borough of Callington, Cornwall, in 1626 and 1628 and for Truro, Cornwall, in 1640 for the Short Parliament and in November 1640 for the Long Parliament. He supported the Parliamentarian side in the English Civil War.

== Origins ==
John Rolle was baptised 13 April 1598 at Petrockstowe, Devon, the 4th son of Robert Rolle (d. 1633) of Heanton Satchville in the parish of Petrockstowe, Devon, by his wife Joan Hele, daughter of Thomas Hele of Fleet, Devon. John was a great-grandson, in a junior line, of George Rolle (c.1486-1552) of Stevenstone, Devon, founder of the influential and wealthy Rolle family of Devon, Keeper of the Records of the Court of Common Pleas and MP for Barnstaple in 1542 and 1545. John's elder brothers included:

- Sir Samuel I Rolle (c.1588-1647), eldest brother, of Heanton Satchville, Member of Parliament for Callington, Cornwall in 1640 and for Devon 1641-1647 and a supporter of the parliamentary side in the Civil War.
- Sir Henry Rolle (1589–1656), of Shapwick in Somerset, Chief Justice of the King’s Bench and MP for Callington, Cornwall, (1614-1623-4) and for Truro, Cornwall (1625- 1629)

== Career ==
John Rolle was a Turkey Merchant. He was elected Member of Parliament (MP) for Callington in the parliaments of 1626 and 1628. In 1628 he refused to pay tonnage and poundage when King Charles I continued to levy the charge in defiance of Parliament. Silks and other goods to the value of £1,517 were seized from him by the customs authorities, and he was forced into a lengthy lawsuit in order to recover them. Writs issued by the courts on his behalf were blocked by order of the Privy Council and the Exchequer, and he was summoned by the king before the Court of Star Chamber, which the House of Commons treated as a breach of its parliamentary privilege, as it was then debating the legitimacy of seizure of merchants' goods by the crown. Rolle's property was not returned and as a result he ceased his trading activities. In 1630 following the dissolution of Parliament, Rolle was again summoned before the Star Chamber and was questioned about speeches made by him in the Commons.

In April 1640 Rolle was elected MP for Truro in the Short Parliament and was re-elected in November 1640 for the Long Parliament. He adhered to the Parliamentary cause on the outbreak of Civil War. In 1641 Parliament instructed the committee of trade to investigate his case and after some delay in 1644 it made its report, as a result of which Rolle was voted full compensation for the sum seized from him and for losses he had suffered, covering his legal expenses and his losses from his refusal to trade after 1628. The expense was met by a fine on the executors of the Farmers of Customs and on Sir William Acton, 1st Baronet, the Sheriff of London who had been in office in 1628.

== Death ==
Rolle died unmarried and was buried at Petrockstowe on 18 November 1648.

== Sources ==
- "Rolle, John (1598-1648)" . Dictionary of National Biography. London: Smith, Elder & Co. 1885–1900.
- D. Brunton & D. H. Pennington, Members of the Long Parliament (London: George Allen & Unwin, 1954)
- Vivian, Lt.Col. J.L., (Ed.) The Visitations of the County of Devon: Comprising the Heralds' Visitations of 1531, 1564 & 1620, Exeter, 1895, p. 654, pedigree of Rolle

Parliament of England
Preceded by Sir Richard Weston; Thomas Wise	Member of Parliament for Callington; 1625–1629; With: Sir Clipseus Crew 1625–1626; Sir William Constable, 1st Baronet 1628–1629	Parliament suspended until 1640
Vacant Parliament suspended since 1629	Member of Parliament for Truro; 1640; With: Francis Rous	Not represented in Barebones Parliament
