= East Tytherley =

Village in Hampshire, England

Coordinates: 51.055°N 1.580°W

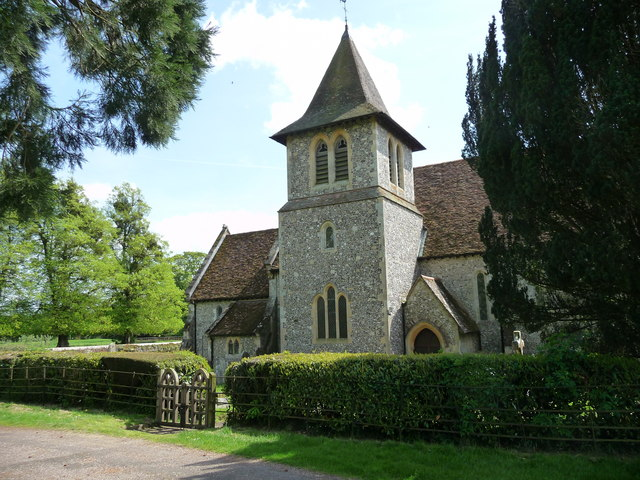
- St Peter's Church, East Tytherley

- Location within Hampshire
- Population: 200 (in 2021)
- OS grid reference: SU295285
- Civil parish: East Tytherton
- District: Test Valley
- Shire county: Hampshire
- Region: South East
- Country: England
- Sovereign state: United Kingdom
- Post town: Salisbury
- Postcode district: SP5
- Dialling code: 01264
- Police: Hampshire and Isle of Wight
- Fire: Hampshire and Isle of Wight
- Ambulance: South Central
- UK Parliament: Romsey and Southampton North

East Tytherley is a village and civil parish in Hampshire, England. The village lies in the Test Valley district, about 6 miles (10 km) north-west of Romsey and 9 miles (14 km) east of Salisbury, Wiltshire. The parish population at the 2021 census was 200.

The name Tytherley comes from Old English and means thin or tender wood.

The village was given to Queen Philippa by her husband Edward III in 1335. When the Black Death spread through London she moved her court to the village.

The village church is St Peter’s. Built in rubble flint with stone dressings, it largely dates from the 13th century, with a heavy restoration between 1862 and 1863. A tower on the north side was completed in 1898. The church is a Grade II* listed building.

In more recent history, William Fothergill Cooke invented the first commercial electrical telegraph whilst living in the village.

== See also ==
- Queenwood College
