= Heanton Satchville, Petrockstowe =

Historic manor in North Devon, England

Coordinates: 50.8766°N 4.1317°W

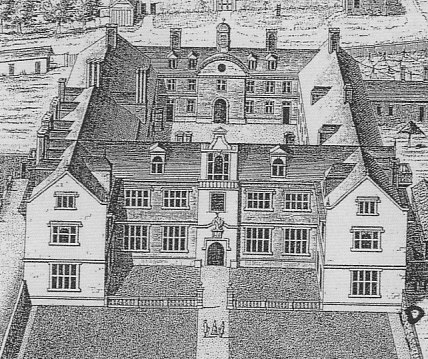
Heanton Satchville depicted in 1739, then the home of Margaret Rolle, 15th Baroness Clinton; detail from Vitruvius Britannicus

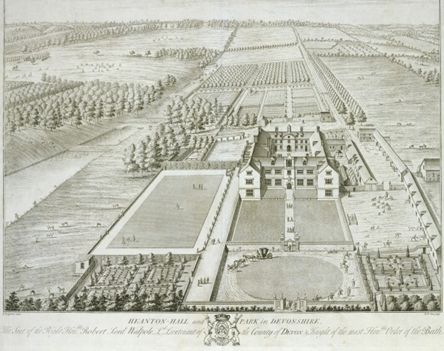
Heanton Hall and Park, an engraving by William Henry Toms, 1739

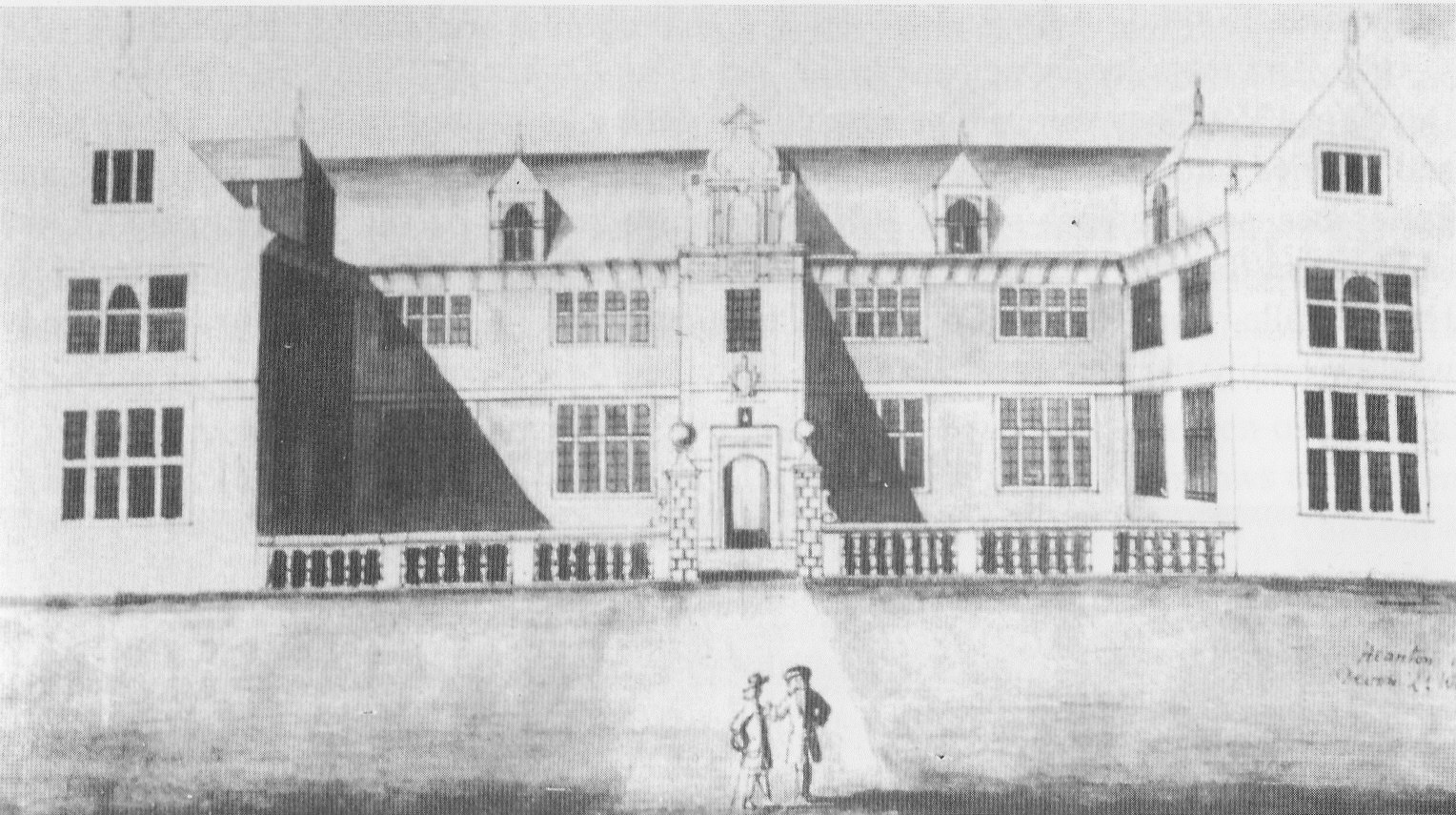
The facade in 1716, drawn by Edmund Prideaux (1693-1745) of Prideaux Place, Cornwall

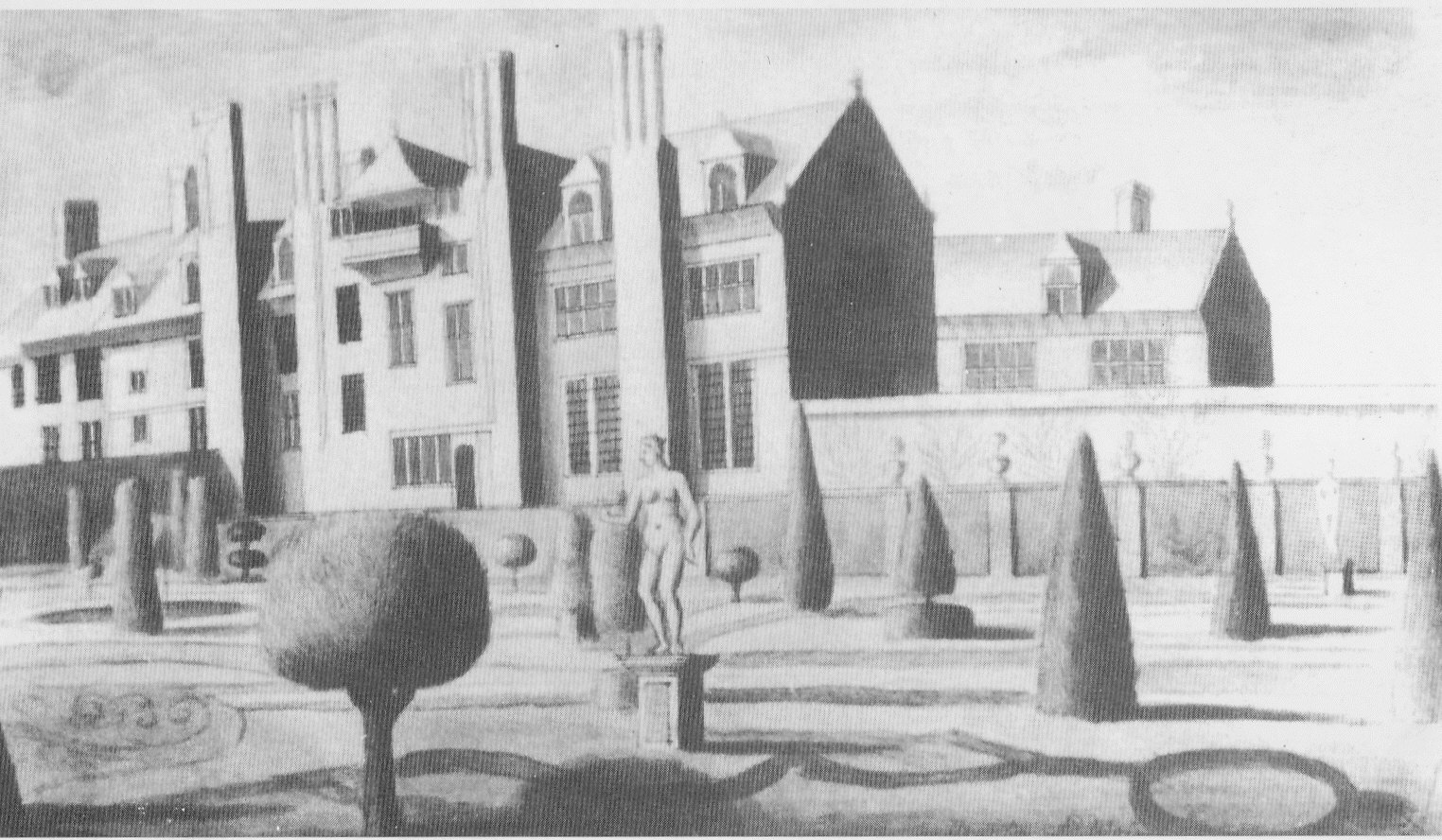
The left wing in 1716, drawn by Edmund Prideaux (1693-1745) of Prideaux Place, Cornwall

Heanton Satchville was a historic manor in the parish of Petrockstowe, North Devon, England. With origins in the Domesday manor of Hantone, it was first recorded as belonging to the Yeo family in the mid-14th century and was then owned successively by the Rolle, Walpole and Trefusis families. The mansion house was destroyed by fire in 1795. In 1812 Lord Clinton purchased the manor and mansion of nearby Huish, renamed it Heanton Satchville, and made it his seat. The nearly-forgotten house was featured in the 2005 edition of Rosemary Lauder's "Vanished Houses of North Devon". A farmhouse now occupies the former stable block with a large tractor shed where the house once stood. The political power-base of the Rolle family of Heanton Satchville was the pocket borough seat of Callington in Cornwall, acquired in 1601 when Robert Rolle (died 1633) purchased the manor of Callington.

== Description of mansion ==
The mansion was at one time "one of the most imposing houses ever to exist in Devon". The Hearth Tax return of 1674 recorded 26 hearths for the house, making it the second largest house in Devon after Werrington.

It was described by Rev. John Swete in 1789. Referring to it as a "vast pile built at different times", he noted a carved date of 1639 which he concluded was not the earliest date of the building but only served to date the portal above which it was located. The parapet walls, the mullions of the windows and the pavement were all made of moorstone. The south side of the house had a "most noble terrace" of 130 paces in width, with a bowling green and adjacent walks. The property afforded views of several churches and the house of Sir James Innes in Huish to the east of the property.

== Descent of the manor ==
=== Normans ===
The manor of "Hantone" is listed in the Domesday Book of 1086 as the 35th of the 176 Devonshire holdings of Baldwin the Sheriff, feudal baron of Okehampton. His tenant was Ralph of Bruyère, from Bruyère in Calvados, Normandy, who also held from Baldwin the manors of Dunterton, Broad Nymett, Appledore, Teignrace and Wolborough. Before 1066 the lord of the manor had been Edwin. It was in Shebbear hundred

=== Sachville ===
According to Magna Britannia (1822), between the reigns of Kings Richard I (1189-1199) and Henry III (1216-1272), the manor of Heanton Sachville was held by members of the Sachville family, originally from Sageuile, France. The Book of Fees lists Yauntone as held by John de Sicca Villa (the Latinized form of the name) from the feudal barony of Okehampton, whose lord was the Courtenay family, later Earls of Devon.

=== Killigrew ===
It later passed to the Killigrew family, a prominent Cornish family.

=== Yeo ===
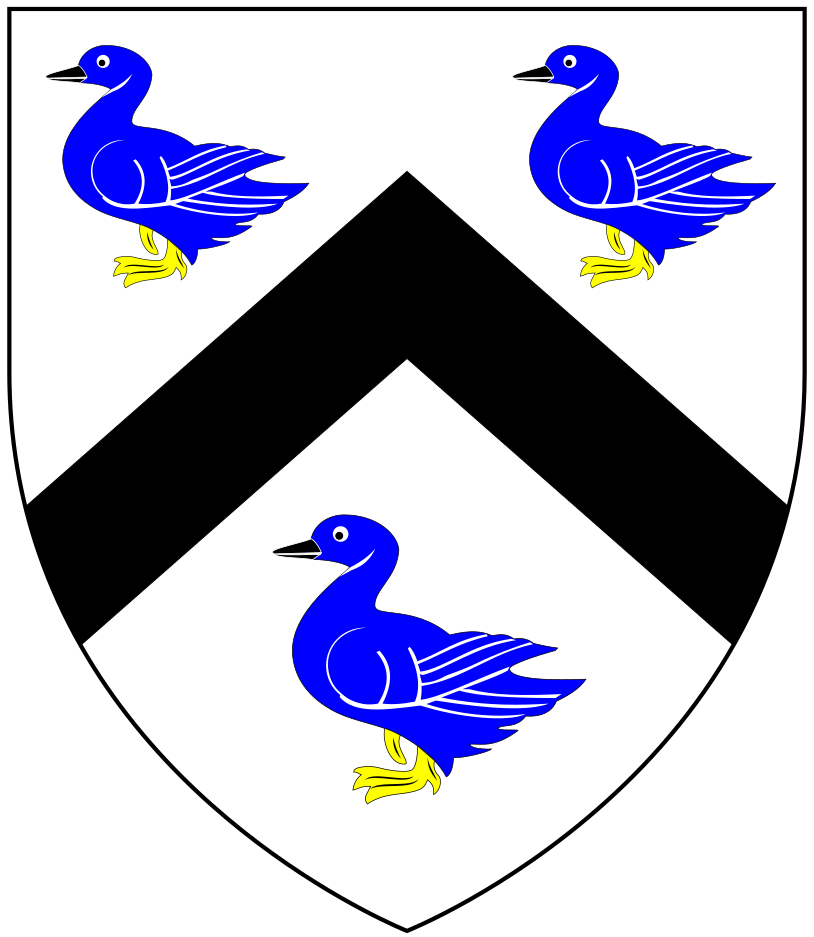
Arms of Yeo: Argent, a chevron sable between three ducks azure. (Note: Per research conducted by Sheila Yeo of the Yeo Society, based on stained glass depictions of Yeo arms in churches of Petrockstowe (Yeo of Heanton Satchville) and Hatherleigh (Yeo of Hatherleigh) both in Devon. The ducks are described as of various breeds by different sources. Heraldic sources give contradictory tinctures: Argent, a chevron between three shovelers sable (Vivian), and Argent, a chevron between three mallards azure (Pole).) The Yeos quartered the arms of Sachville, Esse, Pyne, Jewe and Brightley.

The manor came into the Yeo family at the beginning of the reign of King Edward III (1327-1377) when Nicholas Yeo, son of William Yeo, married Elizabeth Killigrew, daughter and heiress of Henry Killigrew of Heanton Sachville. The descent was as follows:

- Nicholas Yeo, husband of Elizabeth Killigrew, daughter and heiress of Henry Killigrew of Heanton Sachville
- John Yeo (son), who married a certain Alice
- William Yeo (son), Sheriff of Devon in 1359, who married Anne Esse, daughter of John Esse (or Ashe) of Westo in Devon.
- Robert Yeo (fl.1410) (son), who married Jone Pyne, daughter and heiress of William Pyne of Bradwell, Devon
- Robert Yeo (died 1399) (son), husband of Isabell Brightley daughter and heiress of John Brightley of Brightley in Devon.
- John Yeo (born 1380), married Alice Jewe, daughter and part inheratrix of William Jewe of Cotly, Devon
- William Yeo, (son) married Eilin Grenville, a daughter of William Grenville of Stowe in Cornwall and Bideford in Devon.
- Robert Yeo (son), husband of Alice Walrond, daughter of John Walrond of Bradfield, Devon
- William Yeo (son), who married Joane Fulford, daughter of Sir Thomas Fulford of Fulford, Devon
- Robert Yeo (son), who married Mary Fortescue, a daughter of Bartholomew Fortescue of Filleigh
- Margaret Yeo, (daughter and sole heiress), who married Henry Rolle (died circa 1620,) the 3rd or 4th son of George Rolle (died 1552) of Stevenstone, Devon

=== Rolle ===
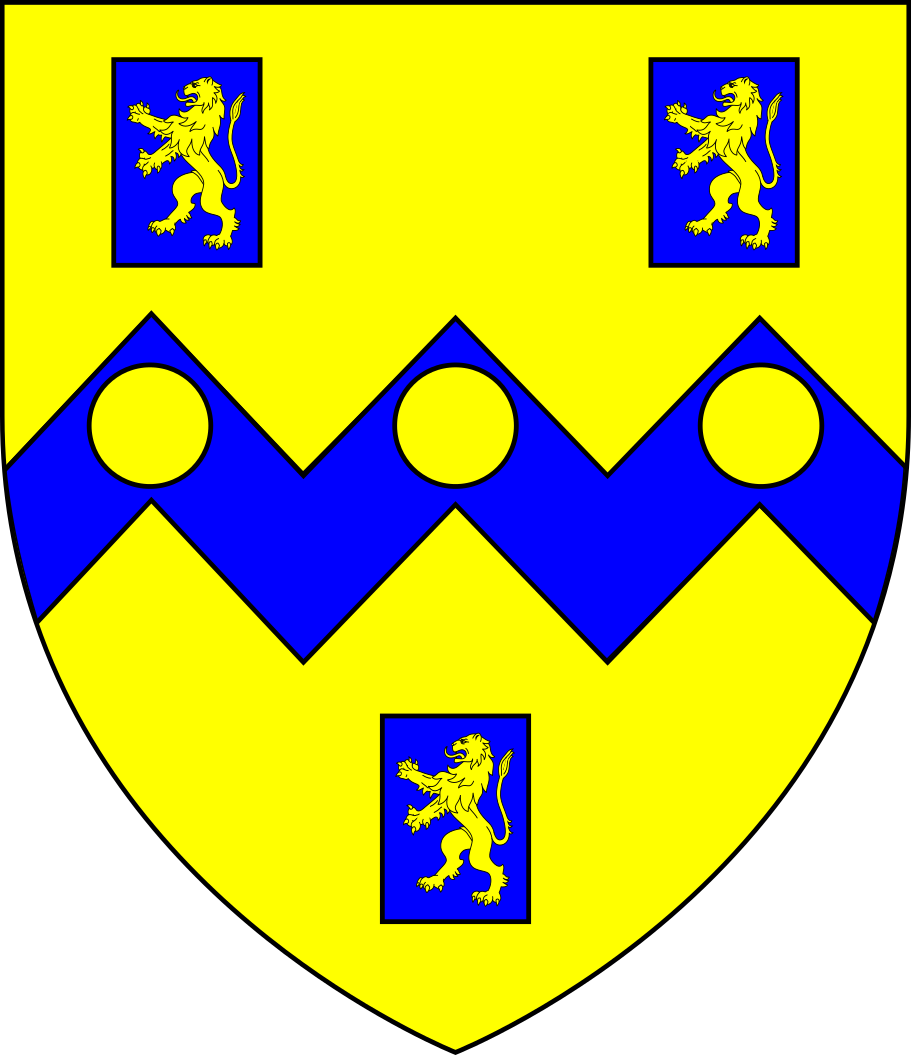
Arms of Rolle: Or, on a fesse dancetté between three billets azure each charged with a lion rampant of the first three bezants

==== Henry Rolle (died c. 1620) ====
Henry Rolle (died c. 1620,), 3rd son of George Rolle (c. 1486-1552), Keeper of the Records of the Court of Common Pleas and MP for Barnstaple in 1542 and 1545, of Stevenstone near Great Torrington, Devon, situated about 5 1/2 miles north-east of Heanton Satchville. Henry married Margaret Yeo, daughter and heiress of Robert Yeo of Heanton Satchville. He also held much land on Exmoor including the Somerset manors of Exton, Hawkridge and Withypool.

===== Rolle and Yeo brasses =====
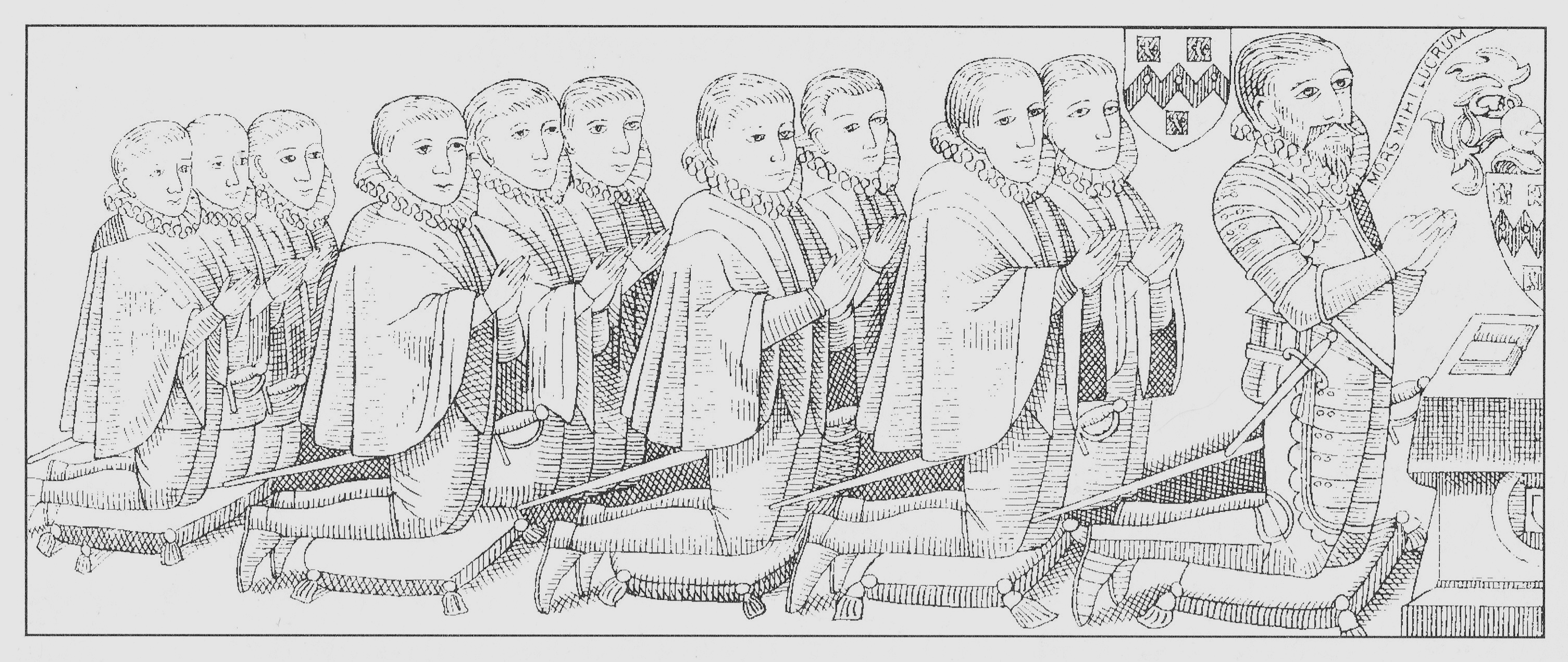
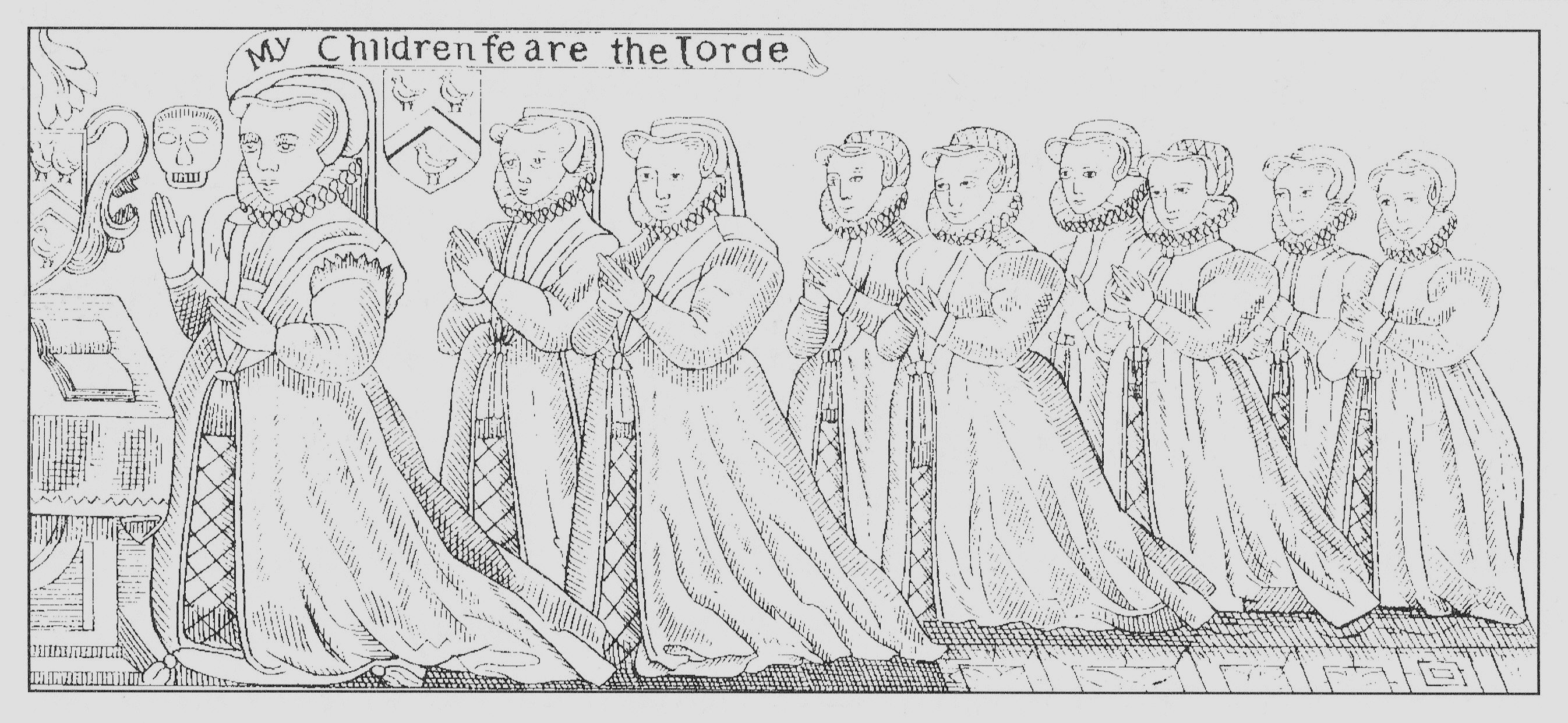
The Rolle brasses shown together as presumed originally located

On the north wall of Petrockstowe parish church are affixed two monumental brasses of Henry Rolle (left, westernmost) and his wife Margaret Yeo (died 1591), (right, easternmost) the heiress of Heanton Satchville. These are not in their original positions, but are likely originally to have been joined together. The two halves of the shields when joined would show the arms of Rolle impaling Yeo.

====== Brass of Henry Rolle ======
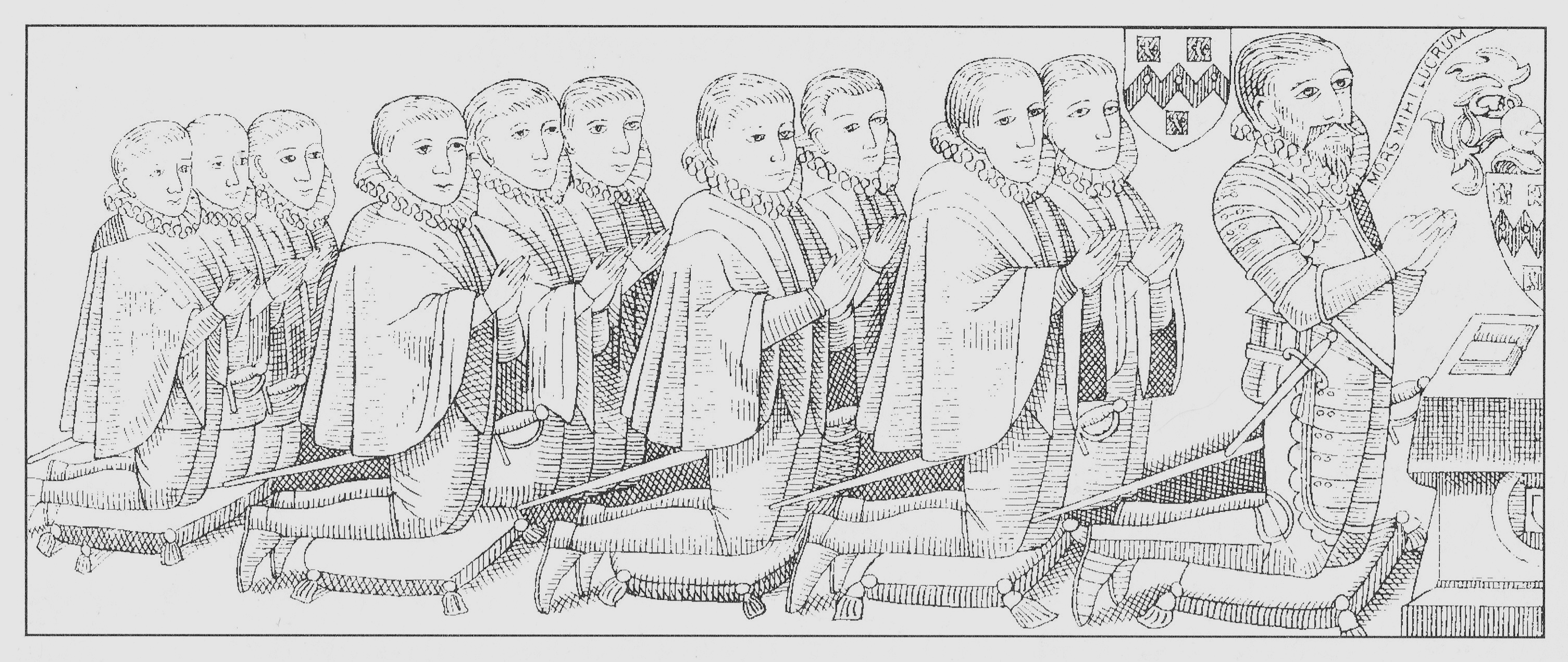
Drawing of Monumental brass of Henry Rolle, north wall of nave, Petrockstowe Church. His ten sons kneel in prayer behind

Inscribed in Roman capitals below is the following text: "Here lyeth the body of Henry Rolle Esquieer fourth sonne of George Rolle of Stevenston who maryed Margaret Yeo daughter and sole heire unto Robert Yeo Esquir decesed and had issue by hir sonnes & doughters nyneteene". On a speech scroll issuing from Henry Rolle's mouth the words MORS MIHI LUCRUM, from St Paul's Epistle to the Philippians, 1:21 (Mihi enim vivere Christus est et mori lucrum, translated in the King James Bible as: "For to me to live is Christ and to die is gain"). The Rolle arms are shown each side of him.

====== Brass of Margaret Yeo ======
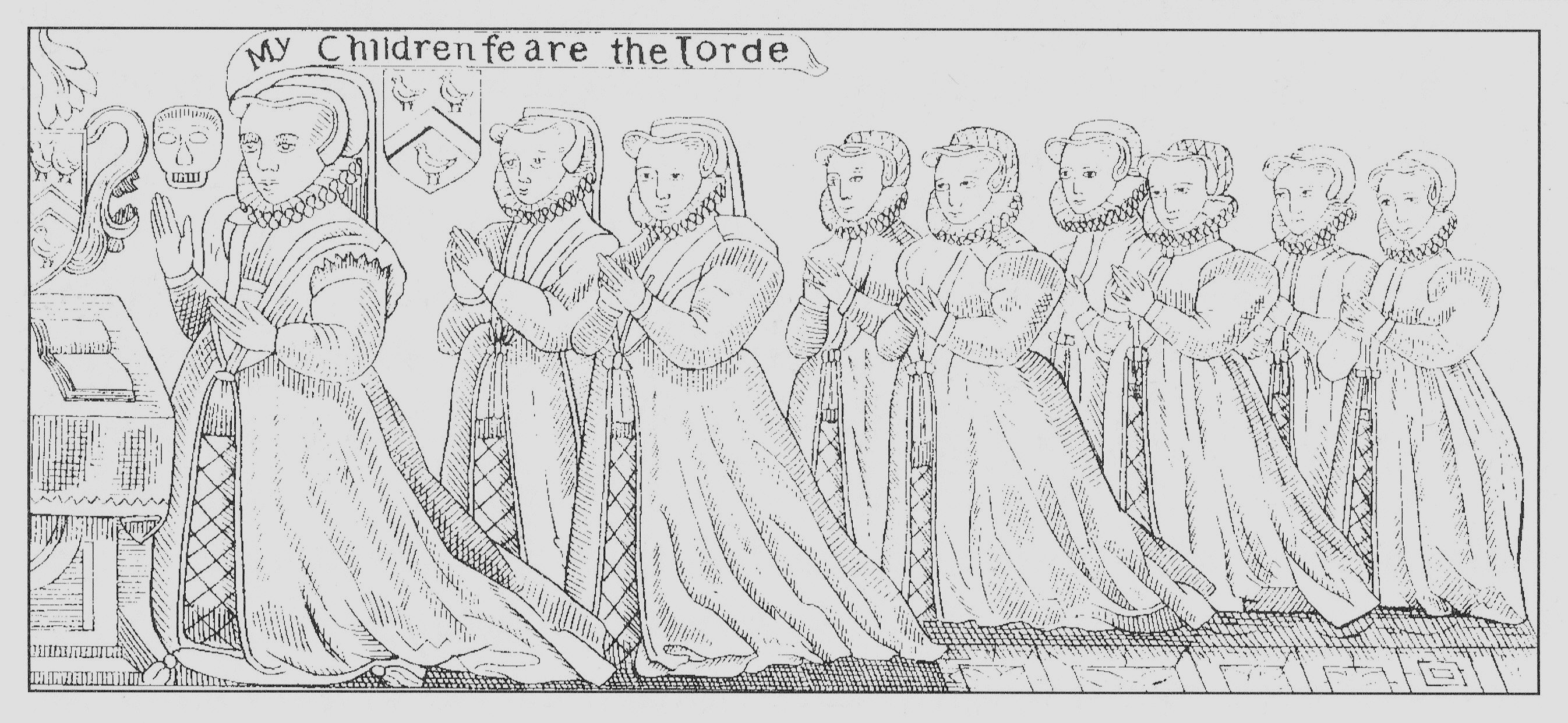
19th-century drawing of monumental brass of Margaret Yeo (died 1591), wife of Henry Rolle and heiress of Petrockstowe manor. North wall of nave, Petrockstowe Church. Her eight daughters kneel behind

Affixed in modern times immediately to the right of the brass of Henry Rolle is that of his wife Margaret Yeo, heiress of Petrockstowe manor. Inscribed below is the following Gothic text: "Here lyeth the bodye of Margaret the wife of Henry Rolle Esquier, daughter and hayre of Robert Yeo Esquire who deceased the Vth day of January and in ye yeare of Our Lorde God 1591". From her mouth issues a speech scroll inscribed: "My children feare the lorde", referring to Psalms 34:11: "Come ye children hearken unto me I will teach you the fear of the Lord" A human skull is shown directly in front of her face, symbolising death, and perhaps her contemplation of that event. Shown either side of Margaret is a shield bearing the arms of Yeo: Argent, a chevron sable between three drakes azure, which arms can be seen in stained glass reset in incomplete form in the vestry window.

==== Robert Rolle (died 1633) ====
Robert Rolle (died 1633) (eldest son), who in 1601 purchased the manor of Callington in Cornwall, thereby gaining the pocket borough seat of Callington in Parliament, which in future served to promote the careers of many Rolles. He nominated to this seat his brother William Rolle (died 1652) in 1604 and 1614, his son Sir Henry Rolle (1589–1656), of Shapwick, in 1620 and 1624, his son-in-law (Note: Vivian indicates that this is Rolle's son Samuel's father-in-law.) Thomas Wise (died March 1641) of Sydenham in Devon, in 1625, and another son John Rolle (1598–1648), in 1626 and 1628. He married Joane Hele (died 1634), daughter of Thomas Hele of Fleete. He produced three distinguished sons, the younger two of whom were:

  - Sir Henry Rolle (1589–1656), of Shapwick in Somerset, Chief Justice of the King’s Bench and MP for Callington, Cornwall, (1614-1623-4) and for Truro, Cornwall (1625- 1629)
  - John Rolle (1598–1648) a Turkey Merchant and MP for Callington, Cornwall, in 1626 and 1628 and for Truro, Cornwall, in 1640 for the Short Parliament and in November 1640 for the Long Parliament. A supporter of the Parliamentarian side in the English Civil War

==== Sir Samuel Rolle (c. 1588-1647) ====
Sir Samuel Rolle (c. 1588-1647) (eldest son and heir) of Heanton Satchville, Member of Parliament for Callington, Cornwall in 1640 and for Devon 1641-1647 and a supporter of the parliamentary side in the Civil War.

==== Robert Rolle (died 1660) ====
Robert Rolle, MP, eldest son and heir (died 1660). He married Lady Arabella Clinton (died 1667), second daughter and co-heiress in her issue of Theophilus Clinton, 4th Earl of Lincoln and 12th Baron Clinton.

==== Samuel Rolle (died 1717) ====
Samuel Rolle (died 1717) (eldest son and heir), elected to Parliament 18 times. He married as his second wife Margaret Tuckfield and had surviving issue a daughter and sole heiress Margaret Rolle, 15th Baroness Clinton (1709-1781). The scale of the wealth of Samuel Rolle of Heanton Satchville is indicated by the list of properties comprised in a peppercorn lease ("Consideration: 5 shillings") of one year dated 1704 to trustees of his second wife Margaret Tuckfield, namely William Davie of Creedy, Devon, Margaret Tuckfield of Raddon Court, Devon, Roger Tuckfield of Raddon Court, Devon and John Tuckfield of Exeter. Included is the Rotten Borough of Callington in Cornwall, the political power-base of the Rolle family:

"Manor, rectory and hundred of Puddletown, including Druce and Willoughbys farms; manors of West Anstey and Town, [?]Irnall, Cotleigh, Culbeer in Offwell, Bradwell in West Down and Ilfracombe, Heanton Satchville with the Barton farm and Hall Moor, Hele Territt alias Flemings Hele, and a tenement called Cuddimors, manor and advowson of Petrockstow, manor of Broom Park Yeate [in Heanton Satchville], manor and advowson of West Putford, manor of Buckish, manor of Nuton [?in East Putford], manor of Hartleigh [in Buckland Filleigh], manor of Sheepwash, manor of Newcourt [?in Holsworthy], manor of Gortleigh [in Sheepwash], manor of Merton, manor of Shebbear with property in Langtree, manor of Welcombe, and properties in Ashwater, Ringsash (Ashreigney), Great Torrington, Sheepwash, Shebbear, Langtree, Buckland Filleigh, Petrockstow, Peters Marland, West Putford, East Putford, Hartland, Woolfardisworthy, Highhampton, Hatherleigh, Jacobstowe, West Down, Ilfracombe, West Anstey, Cotleigh, Culbeer [in Offwell], Monkton, Offwell, Combe Raleigh, Bere Alston, Damierton [?Derriton], and Merton, all in Devon; manors of Norton Rolle, Marhamchurch; manor and borough of Callington; manors of Fursden, Nethercott, Trethavie; manor and rectory of Moorewinstow; properties in Maker, Millbrook, St John, Anthony, Sheviock, Calstock, St Neot, Garrans, Liskeard, Menheniot, St Cleer, Callington, South Hill, St Dominick, Tintagel, Morwenstow, Week St Mary and St Stephen's, and the manor of Barton and Inswork in Millbrook, Maker, St John and Anthony, all in Cornwall".

==== Margaret Rolle, 15th Baroness Clinton (1709-1781) ====
Margaret Rolle, suo jure 15th Baroness Clinton (1709-1781) (daughter and sole heiress). She inherited the title Baroness Clinton from her childless cousin Hugh Fortescue, 14th Baron Clinton, 1st Baron Fortescue and 1st Earl Clinton (died 1751), of Filleigh, Devon.

=== Walpole ===
Arms of Walpole: Or, on a fesse between two chevrons sable three crosses crosslet of the field

- Robert Walpole, 2nd Earl of Orford, whom in 1724 Margaret Rolle had married as her first husband, eldest son of Robert Walpole the first Prime Minister. She lived briefly at Houghton Hall in Norfolk, built by Robert Walpole in 1722, but on the failure of her marriage she moved abroad to Italy.
- George Walpole, 3rd Earl of Orford (died 1791) (only son). He died without progeny and was said never to have visited his Devon seat of Heanton Satchville.

=== Trefusis ===
Arms of Trefusis: Argent, a chevron between three spindles sable

The manor was then inherited by the Trefusis family together with the barony of Clinton and Say, in the person of George William Trefusis, according to Lysons. Robert George William Trefusis (1764–1797) successfully claimed the title 17th Baron Clinton in 1794.

In 1795, the house was destroyed by fire and Rev. John Swete reported in his journal of 1797, when he was visiting John Inglett Fortescue at nearby Buckland Filleigh, that he had seen a painting by Rubens that Baron Clinton had himself rescued from the fire and had sent to Fortescue to look after while he was still homeless. Swete also reported that in the same fire Mr Fortescue had lost a much-valued family portrait of an ancestor which he had sent to Heanton Satchville to be restored by Lord Clinton's picture restorer.

In 1797, the 17th Baron died, leaving his son and heir Robert Cotton St John Trefusis, 18th Baron Clinton (1787–1832) a minor aged ten. Next, George Cholmondeley, 4th Earl of Cholmondeley (1749–1827), later 1st Marquess, who was heir to the Walpole estates, launched a legal suit against the young Robert Trefusis for possession of the former Rolle estates. Although the legal case took nine years to resolve, it was decided in favour of Baron Clinton. The house at Petrockstowe was never rebuilt, but in 1812 the 18th Baron purchased the contiguous manor of Huish to the east together with its capital mansion Innes House, made it the new family seat, and renamed it Heanton Satchville.

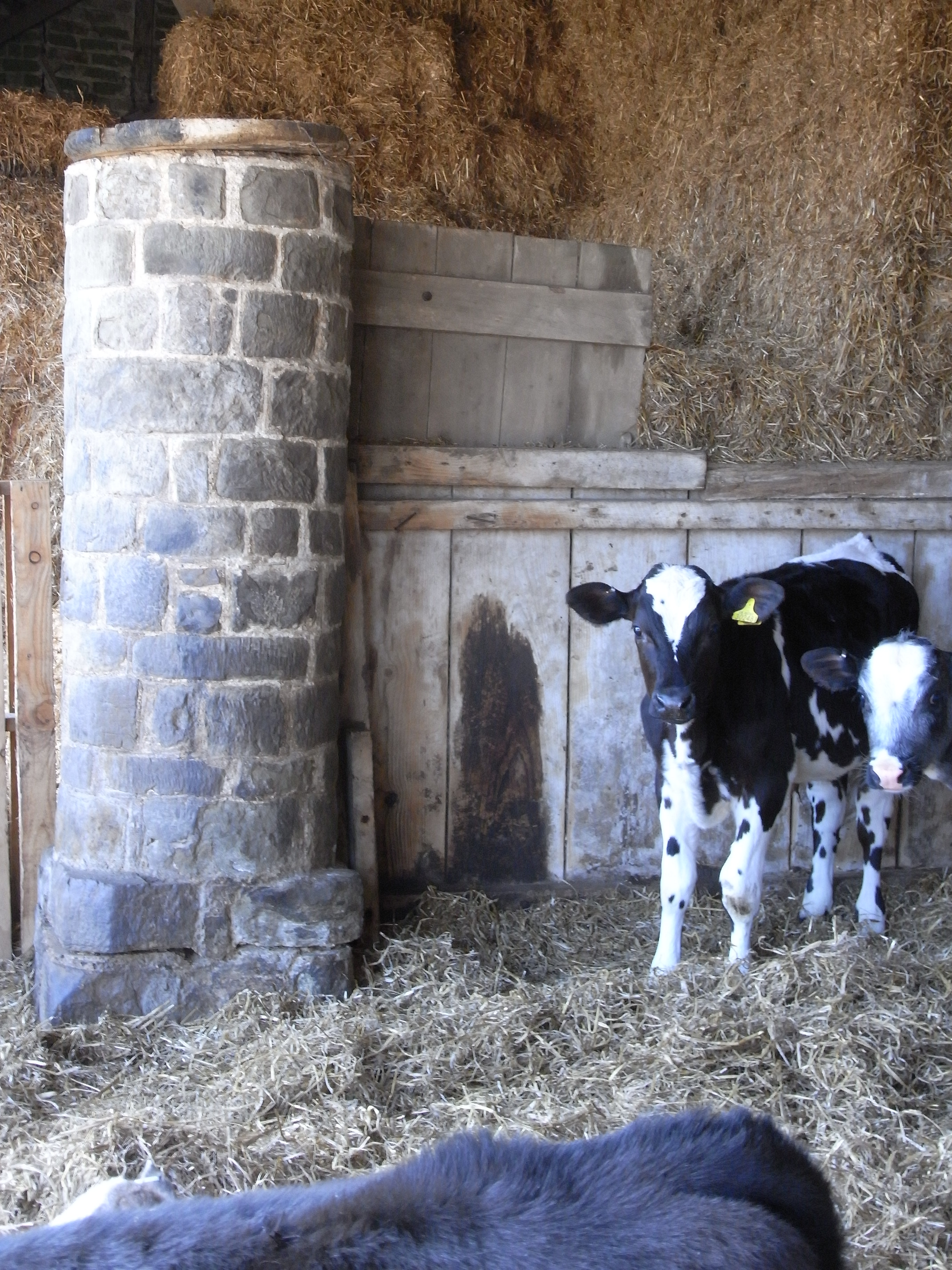
Stone pillar in cow barn at Heanton Barton

Samuel Lysons wrote in 1822: "Heanton Sachville, which was some time a seat of the Rolles, and afterwards of the Earls of Orford, was burnt down several years ago. A farm-house has been fitted up out of the ruins. The deer-park is still kept up". The only remnant of the original mansion is the stable block, now the site of a modern farmhouse called Heanton Barton. A large modern tractor shed occupies the flat site of the former mansion house. (Note: Plans of Old Heanton Satchville, house, gardens and park exist within the Cholmondeley Archives at Houghton Hall, under ref. J/7-8 and J/9-10)

== Sources ==
- Alexander, J. J. (1917). "Devon County Members of Parliament. Part VI". Report & Transactions of the Devonshire Association. 49: 371.
- Broome, John Henry (1865). Houghton and the Walpoles. p. 8.
- "Cholmondeley Family, Marquess of Cholmondeley - GB-2477-Cholmondeley". National Archives.
- Foster, Joseph (1891). The Royal Lineage of Our Noble and Gentle Families (principally Devonians) ... subscribers.
- Gray, Todd & Rowe, Margery (Eds.) (1997). Travels in Georgian Devon: The Illustrated Journals of the Reverend John Swete, 1789-1800. Vol. I. Devon Books. ISBN 0-86114-918-1.
- Gray, Todd & Rowe, Margery (Eds.) (1999). Travels in Georgian Devon: The Illustrated Journals of the Reverend John Swete, 1789-1800. Vol. III. Devon Books. ISBN 1-85522-684-7.
- Great Britain. Court of King's Bench; Richard Vaughan Barnewall; Sir Edward Hall Alderson; William Selwyn (1819). Reports of Cases Argued and Determined in the Court of King's Bench: With Tables of the Names of the Cases and the Principal Matters. J. Butterworth and Son. pp. 626–627.
- "Heanton [Satchville]". Open Domesday.
- Hunneyball, Paul (2010). Andrew Thrush; John P. Ferris (eds.). "Callington Borough". The History of Parliament: the House of Commons 1604-1629. The History of Parliament.
- Lauder, Rosemary (2002). Devon Families. Halsgrove Press. ISBN 978-1-84114-140-4.
- Lauder, Rosemary (2005). Vanished Houses of North Devon (Revised ed.). North Devon Books. ISBN 0-9528645-2-5.
- Leadam, I.S. (1904). "Walpole, Robert (1676-1745)" . In Lee, Sidney (ed.). Dictionary of National Biography. Vol. 59. London: Smith, Elder & Co. pp. 178–207.
- Lysons, Daniel; Lysons, Samuel (1822). Magna Britannia: being a concise topographical account of the several counties of Great Britain. Vol. 6. Cadell.
- Montague-Smith, P. W. (1968). Debrett's Peerage, Baronetage, Knightage and Companionage 1968: With Her Majesty's Royal Warrant Holders : Comprises Information Concerning The peerage, Privy Councillors, Baronets, Knights, and Companions of Orders. Kelly's directories.
- Powell, John Joseph; Coventry, Thomas (1822). A Treatise on the Law of Mortgages. S. Brooke. p. 1149.
- Powlett Duchess of Cleveland, Catherine Lucy Wilhelmina (1889). The Battle Abbey Roll: With Some Account of the Norman Lineages. J. Murray. p. 398.
- Sanders, I.J. (1960). English Baronies: A Study of their Origin and Descent 1086-1327. Oxford.
- Thorn, Caroline and Frank (1985). Domesday Book 9 Devon Part 1/2. Chichester: Phillimore. ISBN 0-85033-492-6.
- Vivian, Lt. Col. J.L., ed. (1895). The Visitations of the County of Devon: Comprising the Heralds' Visitations of 1531, 1564 & 1620. Exeter: For the author by H. S. Eland.
- "Walpole Family of Wolterton, Norfolk, Puddletown Estate, etc. D/PUD". National Archives.
- Westcote, Thomas (1845). A View of Devonshire in MDCXXX: With a Pedigree of Most of Its Gentry. William Roberts. p. 592.
- Worthy, Charles (1892). The history of the suburbs of Exeter: with general particulars as to the landowners, lay and clerical, from the conquest to the present time, and a special notice of the Hamlyn family. Together with "A digression" on the noble houses of Redvers, and of Courtenay, earls of Devon. Henry Gray.
