= Petrockstowe =

Village in Devon, England

Coordinates: 50.8617°N 4.1132°W

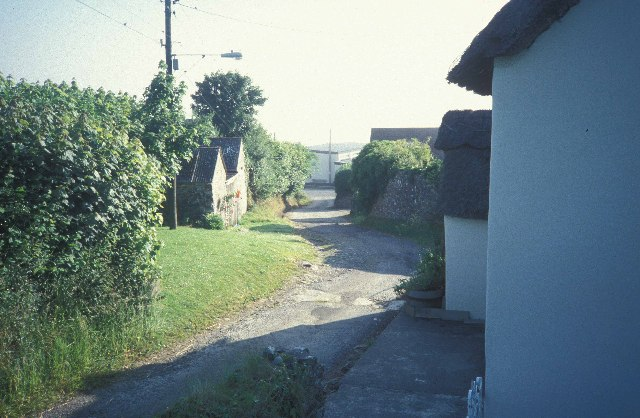
- Cott Lane, Petrockstowe

- Location within Devon
- OS grid reference: SS513091
- Civil parish: Petrockstow
- District: Torridge
- Shire county: Devon
- Region: South West
- Country: England
- Sovereign state: United Kingdom
- Post town: OKEHAMPTON
- Postcode district: EX20
- Dialling code: 01837
- Police: Devon and Cornwall
- Fire: Devon and Somerset
- Ambulance: South Western
- UK Parliament: Torridge and Tavistock

Petrockstowe (or Petrockstow) is a small village and civil parish in the district of Torridge in Northern Devon, England. Its population in 2001 was 379, hardly different from the figure of 385 recorded in 1901. The southern boundary of the parish lies on the River Torridge, and it is surrounded, clockwise from the north, by the parishes of Peters Marland, Merton, Huish, Meeth, Highampton and Buckland Filleigh.

The village lies about four miles (6 km) NNW of the town of Hatherleigh and is some two miles (3 km) west of the A386 road, accessible only by minor roads.

== Etymology ==
The place was called Petrocestoua in the Domesday Book in 1086, in 1150 Petrochestona, and in 1202 Petroc. By 1272 it was called Patrichestowe and Petrokestowe in 1297. In 1535 it was called Stowe S"e'i Petroci. All the names mean St Petroc's place, for the patron saint Petroc. Stowe means "place of burial or the shrine of relics of the saint". By 1910, it was also called Padstow.

The village is referred to by both spellings of Petrockstowe or Petrockstow, with two of the signs entering the village reading Petrockstowe and two reading Petrockstow.

== History ==
There are Bronze Age burial mounds just outside the village, but the first documentary mention of the place is in the Domesday Book. St. Mary's Abbey of Buckfast was the lord in 1066 and 1086 and tenant-in-chief in 1086. Nearby places include: Allisland, Heanton, Hele, Little Marland and Varleys. Sometime after 1086, Petrockstowe was owned by someone other than the abbey. In the 12th century, Robert Warelwast, Bishop of Exeter, restored the manors of Petrockstowe and Ash, also in Petrockstowe, to Buckfast Abbey. It was also owned by the abbey during the reign of Edward I (1272-1307). Author Karen Jankulak, states that the name of the village, Petrockstowe, "suggests a pre-Norman cult of St Petroc (although probably after the ninth century)" and "undoubtedly" by 1177, at the time of the theft of Petroc's relics. Buckfast Abbey "possessed the advowson" which gave them the right to nominate the parish priest. Its abbeys were supported by income producing property and tithes, temporalities and spiritualities.

By 1822, it was called both Stow St. Petrock and Petrockstow, and it was located in the Hundred of Shebbear and Deanery of Torrington. In the 19th century the village had a school, funded by Lord Clinton, and many businesses such as a tannery, blacksmiths, shoemakers and wheelwrights.

Petrockstow railway station was about a mile away from the village. The original Torrington and Marland Railway was built in the late 19th century to carry ball clay to Torrington from the Marland and Meeth clay pits. In 1925 this became the basis of the northern section of the North Devon and Cornwall Junction Light Railway, which remained a private line until 1948 when it became part of the Southern Region of British Railways. The Beeching Axe closed the line to passengers in 1965, but it remained open for freight until 1982.

In the south-east of the parish, at Ash Moor, there are opencast workings for ball clay that extend into the neighbouring parish of Meeth; these clay deposits are in a geological feature known as the Petrockstow Basin, and have been worked for hundreds of years.

=== Churches ===
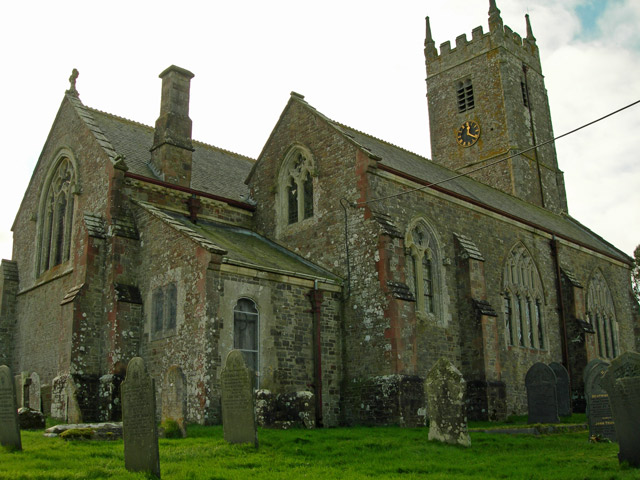
Petrockstowe Church

The parish church, St. Petroc's Church, is dedicated to Saint Petroc. The church closed in 2023 and, as of 2024, is being considered for sale or demolition. It has diagonal buttresses, obelisk pinnacles and an old west tower. Within the church is a Norman font with a Jacobean cover. It has some late medieval stained glass and a Jacobean pulpit. Two stained glass windows were made by Kempe Studios in 1891 and 1896. The church was "largely rebuilt" between 1878 and 1880, retaining the 14th century arcade, 15th-century tower and features of an earlier Norman church. Except for its north arcade tower, it was described by Hoskins as "dull". It does, however, still have an early 14th-century font with a 16th-century cover, and in the vestry, some medieval glass.

On the north wall of the church are affixed two monumental brasses of Henry Rolle (left, westernmost) (Note: Inscribed in Roman capitals below is the following text: "Here lyeth the body of Henry Rolle Esquieer fourth sonne of George Rolle of Stevenston who maryed Margaret Yeo daughter and sole heire unto Robert Yeo Esquir decesed and had issue by hir sonnes & doughters nyneteene". On a speech scroll issuing from Henry Rolle's mouth the words MORS MIHI LUCRUM, from St Paul's Epistle to the Philippians, 1:21 (Mihi enim vivere Christus est et mori lucrum, translated in the King James Bible as: "For to me to live is Christ and to die is gain"). The Rolle armorials, with difference of a mullet, here intended to denote a fourth son (omitted from drawing), are shown each side of him: Or, on a fesse indented azure between three billets of the second each charged with a lion rampant of the first three bezants. Above is shown the crest of Rolle, a cubit arm with clenched fist (omitted from the drawing).) and his wife Margaret Yeo (d.1591), (Note: Affixed in modern times immediately to the right of the brass of Henry Rolle is that of his wife Margaret Yeo, heiress of Petrockstowe manor. Inscribed below is the following Gothic text: "Here lyeth the bodye of Margaret the wife of Henry Rolle Esquier, daughter and hayre of Robert Yeo Esquire who deceased the Vth day of January and in ye yeare of Our Lorde God 1591". From her mouth issues a speech scroll inscribed: "My children feare the lorde", referring to Psalms 34:11: "Come ye children hearken unto me I will teach you the fear of the Lord" A human skull is shown directly in front of her face, symbolising death, and perhaps her contemplation of that event. Shown either side of Margaret is a shield bearing the arms of Yeo: Argent, a chevron sable between three drakes azure, which arms can be seen in stained glass reset in incomplete form in the vestry window. Above is shown the crest of Yeo, apparently a lapwing bird, with crest feathers and long peacock-like tail reaching the ground (omitted from the drawing).) the heiress of the manor of Heanton Satchville within the parish (right, easternmost). The two brasses were probably originally one, with the Rolle shield in the centre.

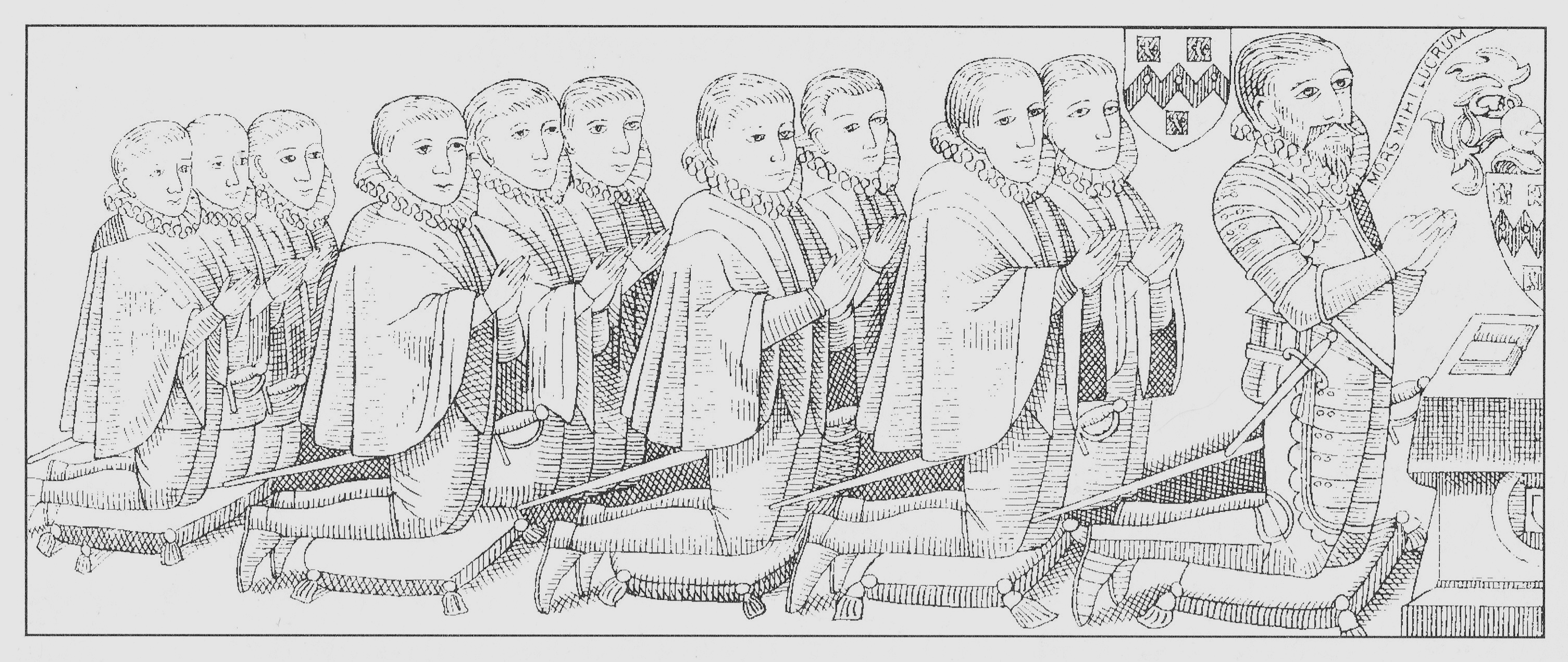
The two Rolle brasses in the parish church shown together, with Henry Rolle and his ten sons kneeling in prayer behind him.

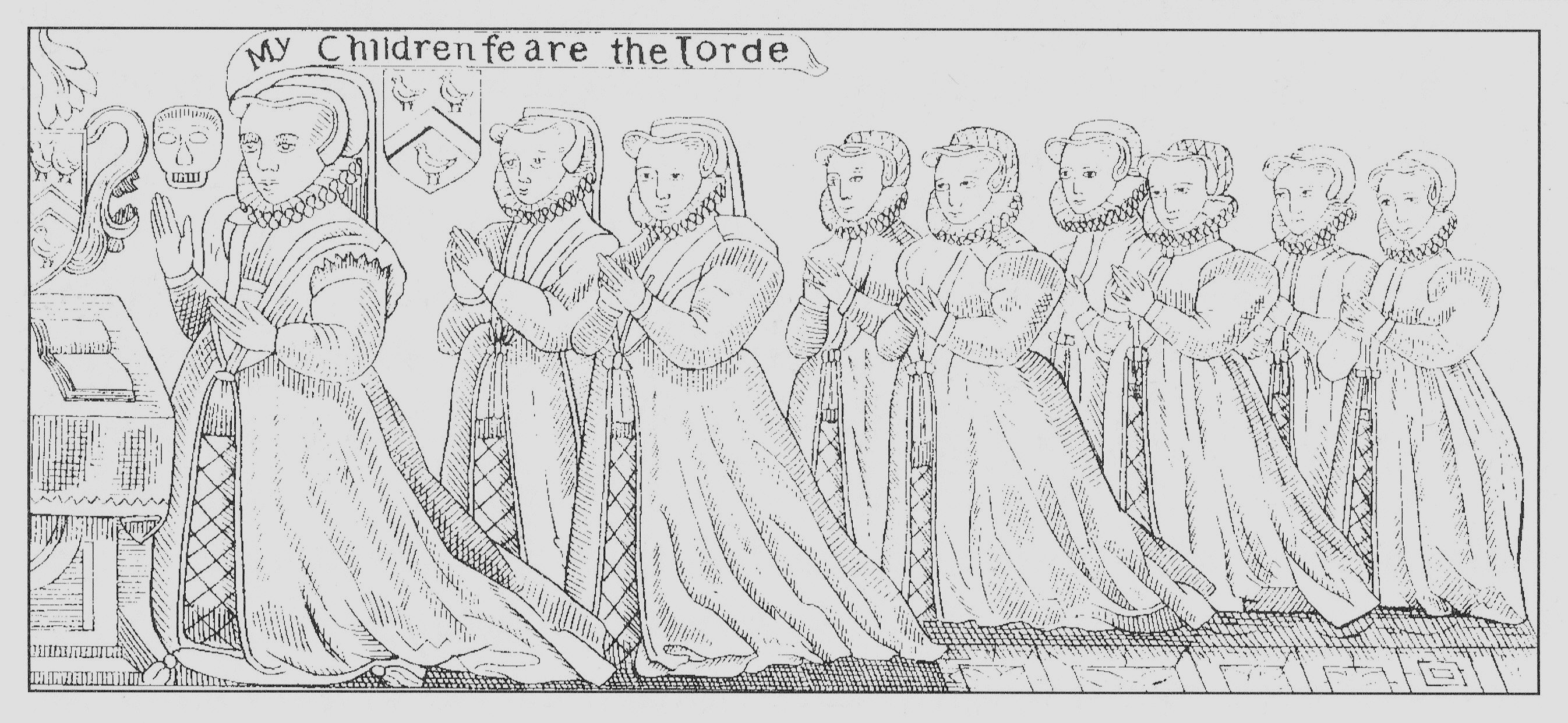
His wife, Margaret Yeo Rolle, and their eight daughters kneeling behind her

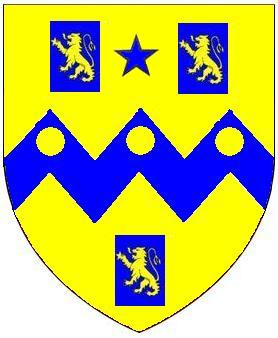
Arms of Henry Rolle of Petrockstowe: Or, on a fesse dancette between three billets azure each charged with a lion rampant of the first three bezants a mullet for difference

The village also has a Methodist chapel which was built in 1933 to replace an earlier chapel of 1842, which is now used as a barn.

=== Heanton Satchville ===
There are very few traces of the mansion of Heanton Satchville surviving today, but it was at one time "one of the most imposing houses ever to exist in Devon". In 1674, it was the second largest house in Devon. The manor was mentioned in the Domesday Book, and was then owned by the Sachvilles and Kelligrews, before it passed into the hands of the Yeo family. By 1359 it was owned by William Yeo when he was Sheriff of Devon. Margaret Yeo, the sole heiress of Robert Yeo, married Henry Rolle, (died about 1620), and thus the manor passed to the Rolles, now represented by the Barons Clinton. The house was destroyed by fire in 1795, after which the Trefusis family purchased a mansion in nearby Huish, renamed it Heanton Satchville, and made it their seat.

== Community facilities ==
The village pub, The Laurels Inn, dates to the 17th century when it was a coaching inn on the route between Launceston and Lynton. Since then, according to the village website, it has been used as a magistrate's court, a home for fallen women of the parish, a lodging house, a coffee tavern and a private house before re-opening as a pub in the 1970s. Opposite the pub, on the site of the old village school, is the Baxter Hall, a modern village hall, opened by Lord Clinton in 1978 and refurbished in 1998. Baxter Hall, named after Ethel Baxter who donated the monies for its construction, is a multi-purpose hall for community social events. It has a stage, large hall, kitchen and skittles equipment.

== Recreation ==
The village also has a play area, an extensive recreation area and a cricket ground. The Recreation Ground, covering 8.5 acres, has a nine-hole pitch and putt golf course, skate ramp, cricket pitch, field shelter, and pavilion with a clubroom, kitchen, changing rooms and toilet. It is located a short walk from the village centre, and is next to the Tarka Trail.

The Tarka Trail, a 180 miles (290 km) circuit, runs from Meeth to Braunton and in this area follows the route of the former North Devon and Cornwall Junction Light Railway. The portion near Petrockstowe is generally flat. It comes within about a mile of the centre of the village, passing through the old Petrockstowe station.

There are two nature reserves in the area, Meeth Quary and Ash Moor, both owned by the Devon Wildlife Trust. Meeth Quarry has wetland, open water and woodland habitats which support 18 species of national importance and six threatened wildlife habitats. Ash Moor, interlinked with Meeth Quarry, is on the Tarka Trail. Shallow scrapes and ponds support dragonflies, birds, butterflies and other insects.

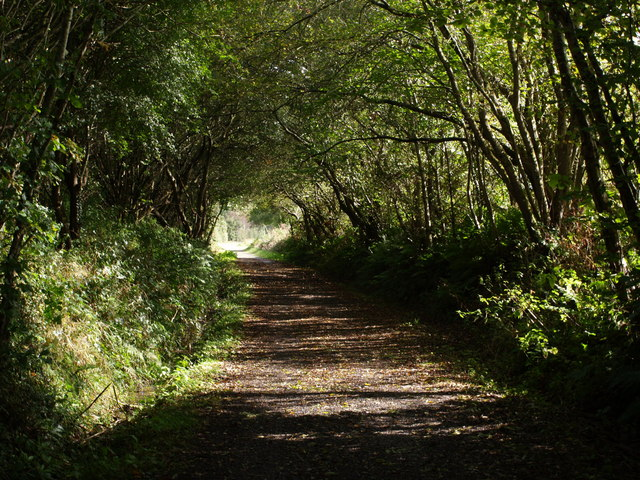
The Tarka Trail, combining footpath and cycleway (NCN route 3), follows the former track of the North Devon and Cornwall Junction Light Railway across Bury Moors.

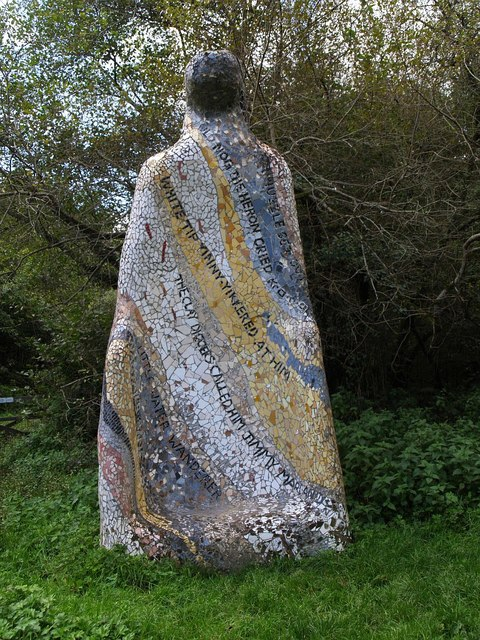
Katy Hallet, The Guardian, mosaic sculpture. On the Tarka Trail by Ladywell Wood. The lettering includes quotes from "Tarka the Otter".

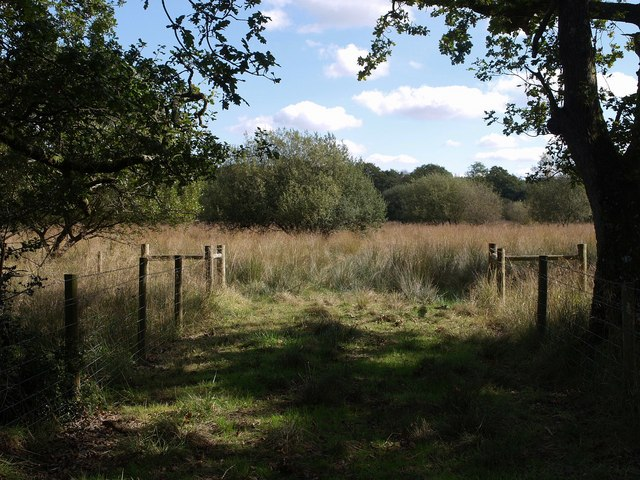
Ash Moor nature reserve

== Transport ==
Limited bus service is provided by Beacon bus services at the Chapel Close bus stop as of June 2013, including: There are several train stations in the area. Airports in the area include Newquay Airport and Exeter Airport.

== Gallery ==
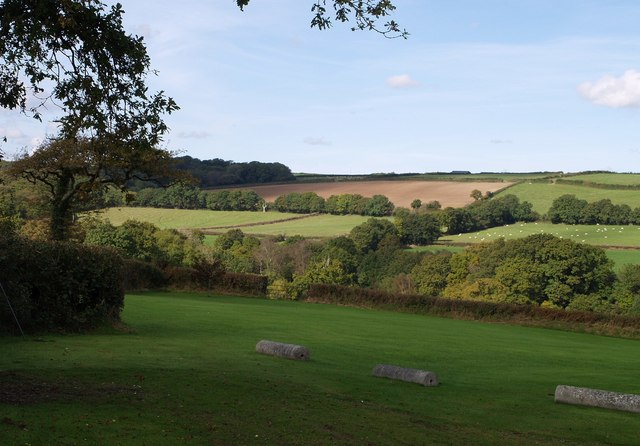
Across Patchill Plantation, looking across the top of the wood and the valley.

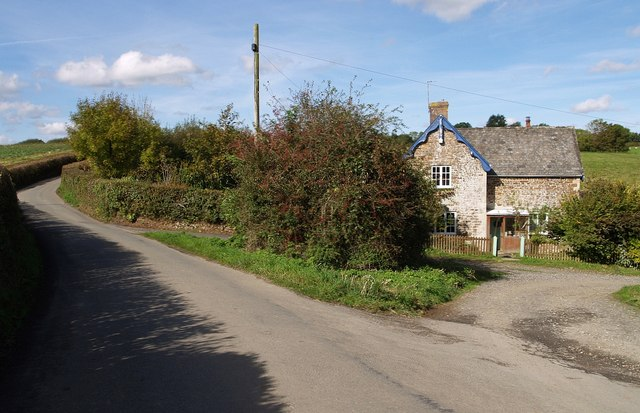
Aish Lodge

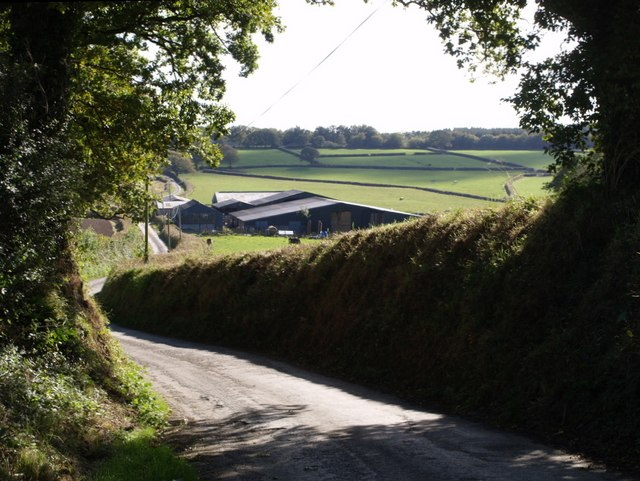
Farm buildings near Hook Farm

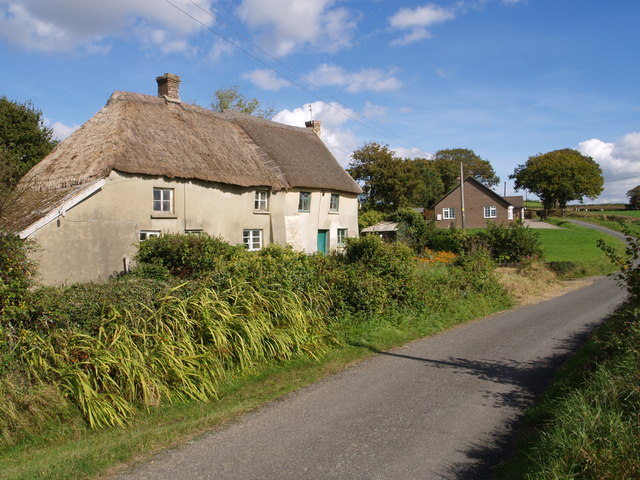
Magpie Contrasting conditions of thatch, and contrasting ages of buildings. This little group is on the lane from Sheepwash to Patchel Cross.

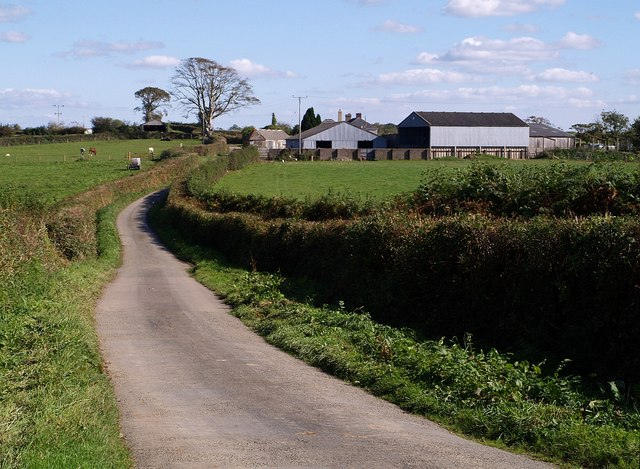
Westacott, a farm seen along the lane from Filleighmoor Gate to Patchel Cross.

== Notable people ==
John Bassett Martin, (1847–1944) Pre-eminent Victorian Journalist and Freemason. Born in Petrockstowe on 2 October 1847.

Kenneth John Dymond, (1929–2016) Horticulturalist. Breeder and hybridiser of pelargoniums. Best known for his Quantock angel pelargoniums including multi-award-winning Quantock Kirsty, Quantock Matty and Quantock Double Dymond. Born in Petrockstow on 6 May 1929.
