= Meeth =

Village in Devon, England

Coordinates: 50°51′N 4°04′W

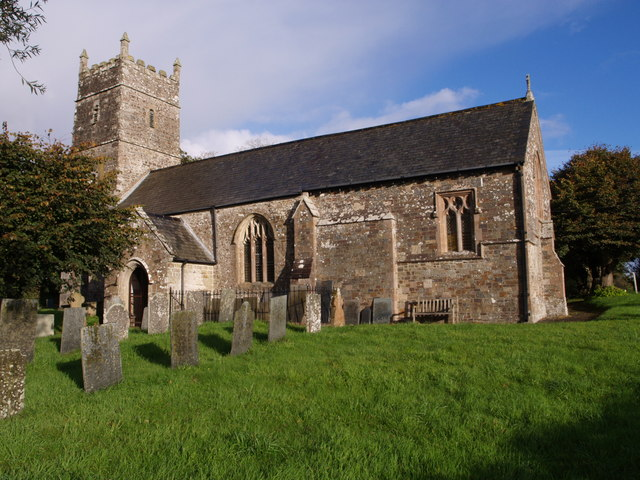
- St Michael's Church

- Location within Devon
- Population: 161 (2021 census)
- Civil parish: Meeth
- District: West Devon
- Shire county: Devon
- Region: South West
- Country: England
- Sovereign state: United Kingdom
- Police: Devon and Cornwall
- Fire: Devon and Somerset
- Ambulance: South Western

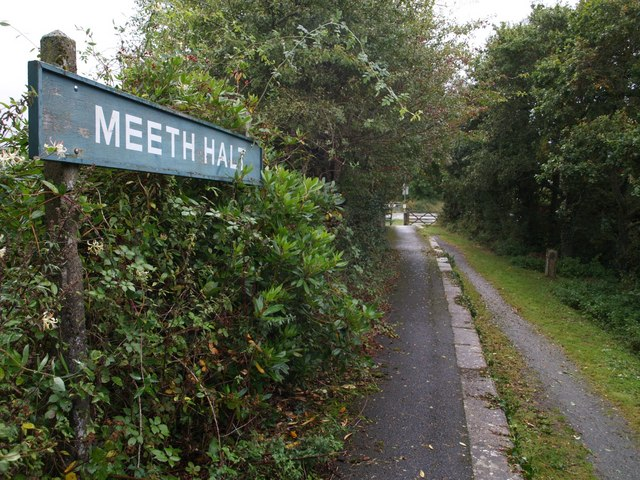
Meeth Halt (disused), near to Meeth, Devon, Great Britain. The North Devon and Cornwall Junction Light Railway.

Meeth is a village and civil parish in the West Devon district, in the county of Devon, England roughly 13.5 km (8.4 mi) north-northwest of Okehampton and 40.7 km (25.3 mi) west-northwest of Exeter. It lies to the west of the River Torridge. In the past, ball clay mines were a major source of employment in the village, lying just to the west, however these closed in 2004. Their site is now a nature reserve owned by the Devon Wildlife Trust, called Meeth Quarry. The Trust's Ash Moor reserve is also located close to the village. In 2021 the parish had a population of 161.

From 1925 until 1982, the branch railway line from Halwill Junction to Torrington, the North Devon and Cornwall Junction Light Railway, ran through Meeth, allowing clay from the mines to be transported to Bideford for onward transport by sea; passenger service was available until 1965 from Meeth Halt railway station. The Tarka Trail long-distance footpath now finishes/starts in Meeth, using the route of the former railway to reach Bideford, and skirting the Meeth Quarry and Ash Moor nature reserves.

A one time notable resident was John Lemprière, who is buried and has a monument in the church yard.

The village has a small centre which encompasses the recently re-opened church, village hall and village pub (The Bull and Dragon, ca. 1490). A good local bus service runs daily and a small B&B has just opened in the village.

== Historic estates ==
the parish of Meeth contains various historic estates including:

- Croker's Hele, formerly a seat of the Croker family;
- Fry's Hele (today corrupted to "Friar's Hele"), formerly a seat of the Fry family.
