= Sydenham =

Sydenham may refer to:

== Places ==
=== Australia ===
- Sydenham, New South Wales, a suburb of Sydney
  - Sydenham railway station, Sydney
- Sydenham, Victoria, a suburb of Melbourne
  - Sydenham railway line, the name of the Sunbury railway line, Melbourne until 2012
  - Watergardens railway station, formerly called Sydenham

=== Canada ===
- Sydenham, Frontenac County, Ontario
- Sydenham Ward, a district within the city of Kingston, Ontario
- Sydenham, Grey County, Ontario, a former township within Meaford
- Owen Sound, Ontario, formerly called Sydenham
- Sydenham River (Lake Huron), which empties into Georgian Bay on Lake Huron, Ontario
- Sydenham River (Lake Saint Clair), which empties into Lake Saint Clair, Ontario

=== India ===
- Sydenham College, Mumbai

=== New Zealand ===
- Sydenham, New Zealand, a suburb of Christchurch
  - Sydenham (New Zealand electorate), a former Christchurch electorate

=== South Africa ===
- Sydenham, Durban, an inner city suburb of Durban, South Africa
- Sydenham, Gauteng, a suburb of Johannesburg, South Africa
- Sydenham, Port Elizabeth, South Africa, on route R75

=== United Kingdom ===
==== London ====
- Sydenham, London
  - Sydenham railway station (London)
  - Sydenham Hill
  - Sydenham Hill railway station
  - Lower Sydenham railway station
  - Sydenham High School, a private school for girls
  - Sydenham School, a state school for girls
  - Sydenham (ward), electoral ward

==== Belfast ====
- Sydenham, Belfast, a suburb and electoral ward of East Belfast
- Sydenham railway station (Belfast)

==== Other places in UK ====
- Sydenham, Oxfordshire, near Thame
- Sydenham, Somerset, an area of Bridgwater, Somerset
- Sydenham, Leamington Spa, a suburb of Royal Leamington Spa, Warwickshire
- Sydenham Damerel, Devon
- Sydenham House, Devon, the seat built by Sir Thomas Wise in Marystow parish, Devon

=== United States ===
- Sydenham Hospital for Communicable Diseases, Baltimore
- The former Sydenham Hospital, Harlem, New York City

== People ==
- Charles Poulett Thomson, 1st Baron Sydenham
- John Sydenham (disambiguation)
- Thomas Sydenham, English physician
- Colonel William Sydenham, Cromwellian soldier and brother of Thomas
- Sydenham Elnathan Ancona (1824–1913), Democratic member of the U.S. House of Representatives from

== Medicine ==
- Sydenham's chorea, an infectious disease involving the central nervous system

== See also ==
- Sydenham House (disambiguation)
- Sydenham railway station (disambiguation)
