= Mount Wise, Plymouth =

Historic estate in Devon, England

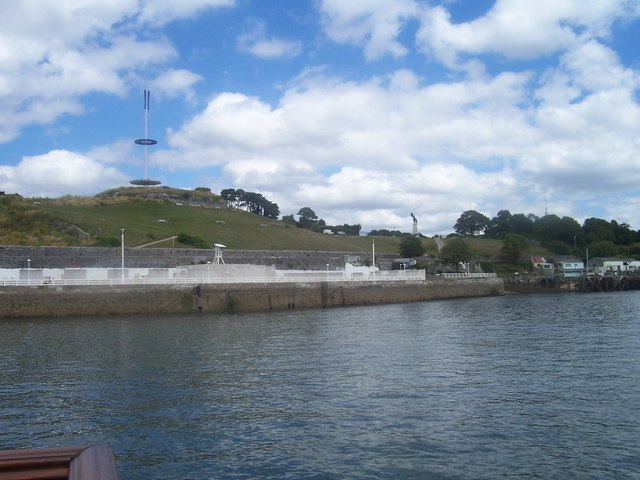
Mount Wise with 1770s Redoubt now containing a 40 m high mast erected in 1998 with circular viewing platform for recreational visitors, and statue of Winged Victory atop the Scott Memorial (distant right), commemorating the explorer Captain Robert Falcon Scott, Royal Navy, and others who died in March 1912 on their return from the South Pole. Behind the low white wall in the foreground is a series of small swimming pools

Mount Wise is a historic estate situated within the historic parish and manor of Devonport and situated about one mile west of the historic centre of the city of Plymouth, Devon. It occupies "a striking waterfront location" with views across Plymouth Sound to Mount Edgcumbe and the English Channel. Until 2004 it was a headquarters for senior Admiralty staff and was inaccessible to the public.

== Manorial history ==
Prior to the establishment of the Royal Dockyard in 1690, a manor house known as Mount Wise was the only significant structure in the area.

=== Wise ===
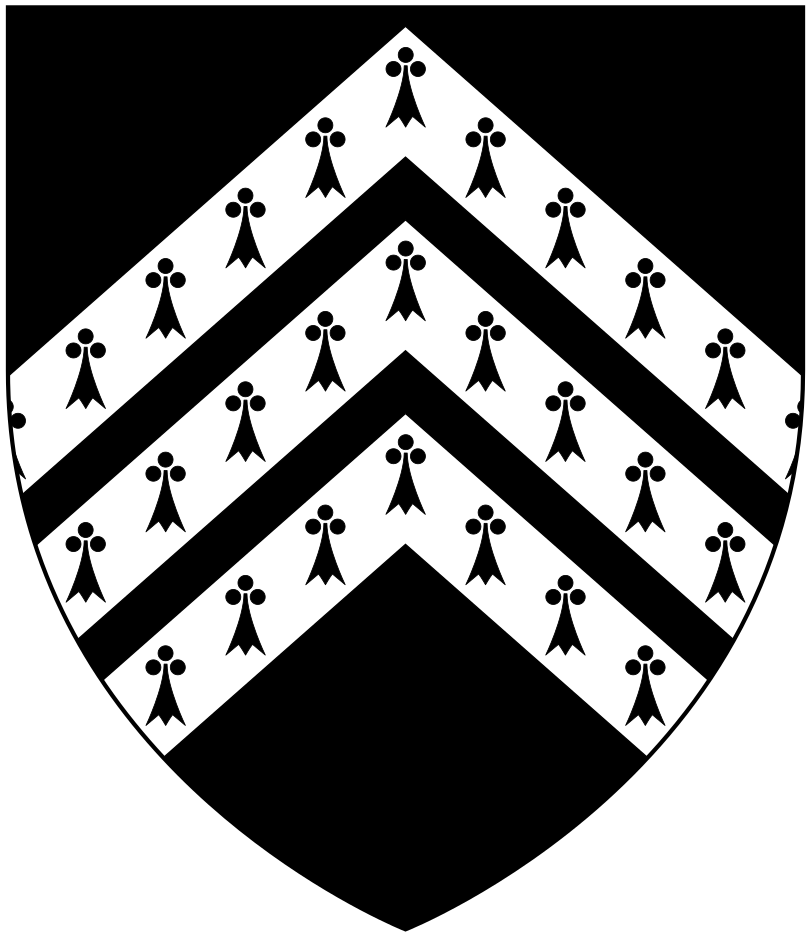
Arms of Wise of Sydenham and Mount Wise: Sable, three chevronels ermine

In about 1400 the manor of Stoke Damerel, within which is situated Mount Wise, was inherited by Thomas Wise of Sydenham in the parish of Marystow in Devon, (son and heir of John Wise (fl.1403) of Sydenham, living in 1403) upon his marriage to Margaret Brett (alias Brit), daughter and heiress of Robert Brett of Staddiscombe, near Plymstock, lord of the manor of Stoke Damerel. Thomas Wise also inherited from his wife the estates of Staddiscombe, Halgewell, Walford and Stoddon.

The mansion house known as Mount Wise was built by Sir Thomas Wise (c.1576-1630), Knight of the Bath, of Sydenham, Sheriff of Devon in 1612 who in 1621 served as a Member of Parliament for Bere Alston in Devon. He much beautified his principal seat of Sydenham House, and added such height and such a great amount of granite to it that his contemporary Risdon (d.1640) remarked: "the very foundation is ready to reel under the burthen". His contemporary the Devon historian Sir William Pole (d.1635) remarked as follows concerning the manor of Stoke Damerel and Sir Thomas Wise (c.1576-1630):

"Hee hath bwilded heere, uppon an advanced ground a newe howse for his pleasure & named it Mount Wise, where Thomas (Wise) Esqr. his sonne now dwelleth, w(hi)ch hath married (Mary), daughter of Edward Lord Chichester, Vicont of Cairfergus".

His son, as Pole states, was Thomas Wise (c.1605-1641), who married Lady Mary Chichester, daughter of Edward Chichester, 1st Viscount Chichester of Carrickfergus in Ireland and of Eggesford in Devon. He was Sheriff of Devon in 1638 and in 1625 a Member of Parliament for Callington in Cornwall and for Bere Alston in the parliaments of King Charles of 1625, 1626 and 1628 to 1629, and for Devon twice in 1640. He named it "Mount Wise" following a common tradition shared by several estates particularly on the south coast of Devon, for example Mount Edgcumbe, Mount Galpin, Mount Tavy, Mount Radford, Mount Drake in the parish of Musbury, Mount Dinham in Exeter, Mount Batten near Plymouth, Mount Boone, Mount Gold (Plymouth), etc.

The son of the latter was Edward Wise (1632-1675) of Sydenham, thrice MP for Okehampton, who in 1667 sold the manor of Stoke Damerell for £11,600 to Sir William Morice (1602-1676). Edward Wise (1632-1675) was predeceased by both his childless sons, and his sole heiress became his only daughter Arabella Wise, who married Edmund Tremayne (1649-1698) of Collacombe in the parish of Lamerton on Devon, to which family passed Sydenham.

=== Morice ===
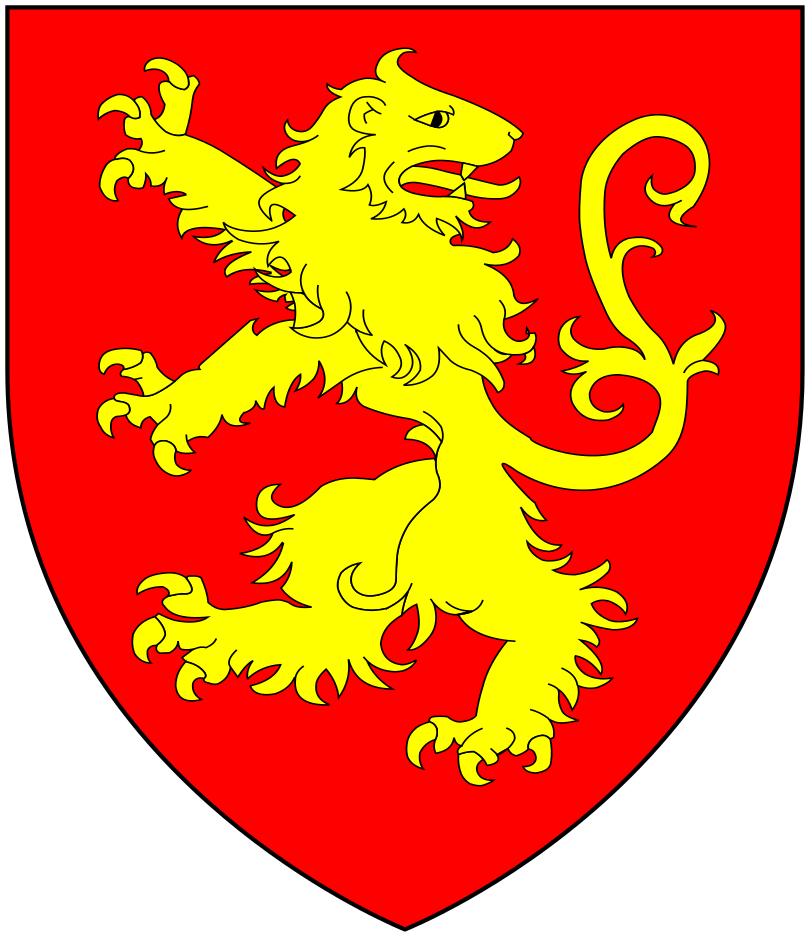
Arms of Morice: Gules, a lion rampant reguardant or

Sir William Morice (1602-1676) of Werrington in Devon, was Secretary of State for the Northern Department and a Lord of the Treasury from June 1660 to September 1668. Stoke Damerel and Mount Wise passed to his son Sir William Morice, 1st Baronet (c. 1628–1690), who in turn was succeeded by his second son Sir Nicholas Morice, 2nd Baronet (c. 1681–1726). The latter's son was Sir William Morice, 3rd Baronet (c. 1707–1750), who died without progeny and by his will dated 1744 bequeathed his estates to his nephew Sir John St Aubyn, 4th Baronet (1726–1772), son of his sister Catherine Morice and her husband Sir John St Aubyn, 3rd Baronet (1696–1744).

=== St Aubyn ===
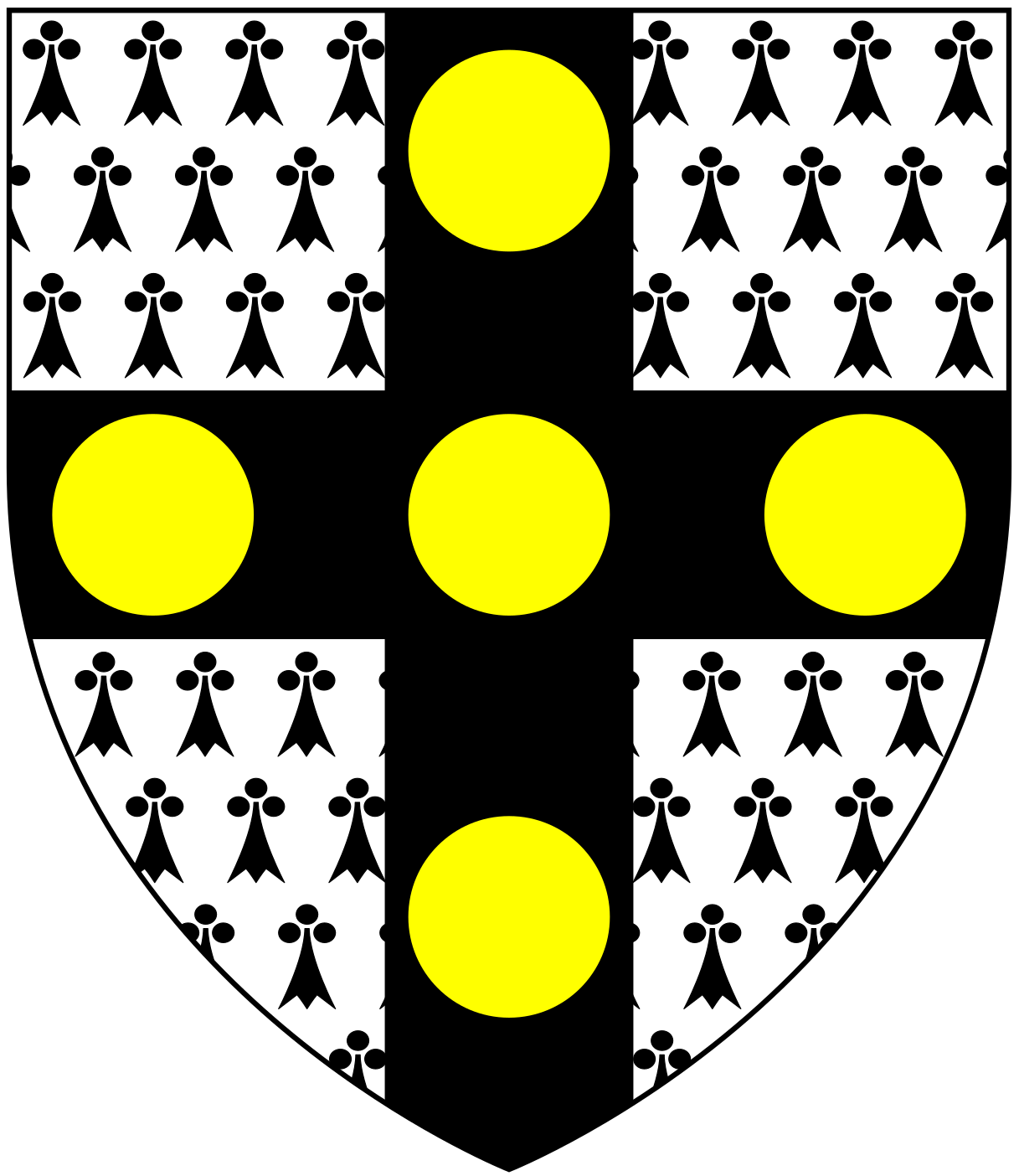
Arms of St Aubyn: Ermine, on a cross sable five bezants

Sir John St Aubyn, 4th Baronet (1726–1772), was the son of Sir John St Aubyn, 3rd Baronet (1696–1744) by his wife Catherine Morice, sister and in her issue co-heoress of Sir William Morice, 3rd Baronet (c. 1707–1750). The son of the 4th Baronet was Sir John St Aubyn, 5th Baronet (1758–1839), the owner of the estate in 1810 when it was stated of his inheritance of Stoke Damerel and Mount Wise: "The value of this property has probably increased as much as that of any landed property of its extent in the kingdom". The population of the parish of Stoke Damerel, largely co-terminous with the manor, had increased from 3,361 in 1733 to 23,747 in 1800. The 5th Baronet's land in Stoke Damerel included the town of "Plymouth Dock", which he still owned in 1810, having sold to the government prior to that date the site of the Royal Dock Yard and the lines of military defence surrounding the town of "Plymouth Dock", ("Devonport Dock Lines") which included Mount Wise.

== Military use ==
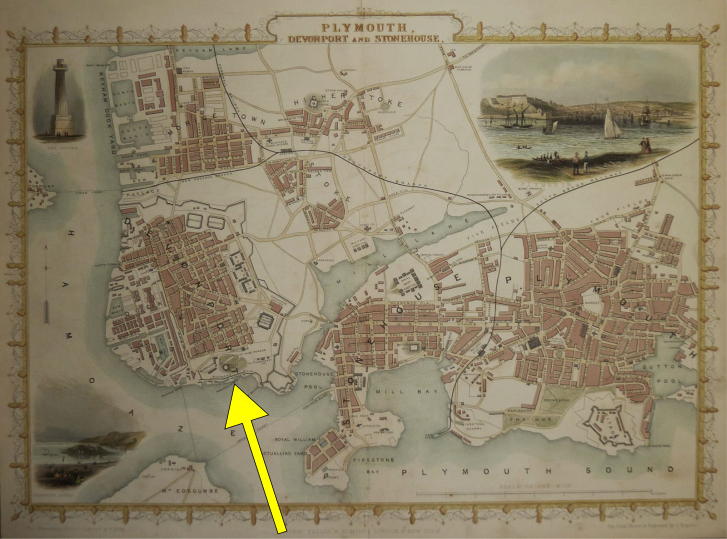
Mount Wise indicated with yellow arrow on an 1851 map of Plymouth. The Royal Dockyard is to the immediate west (left), the whole complex being surrounded on the land side (north and east) by the "Devonport Dock Lines", a defensive wall visible on the map

The defensive lines were in place by the mid-18th century. A large number of soldiers was required to man the defences; to house them, a series of square barracks was built around the perimeter in the late 1750s and early '60s.

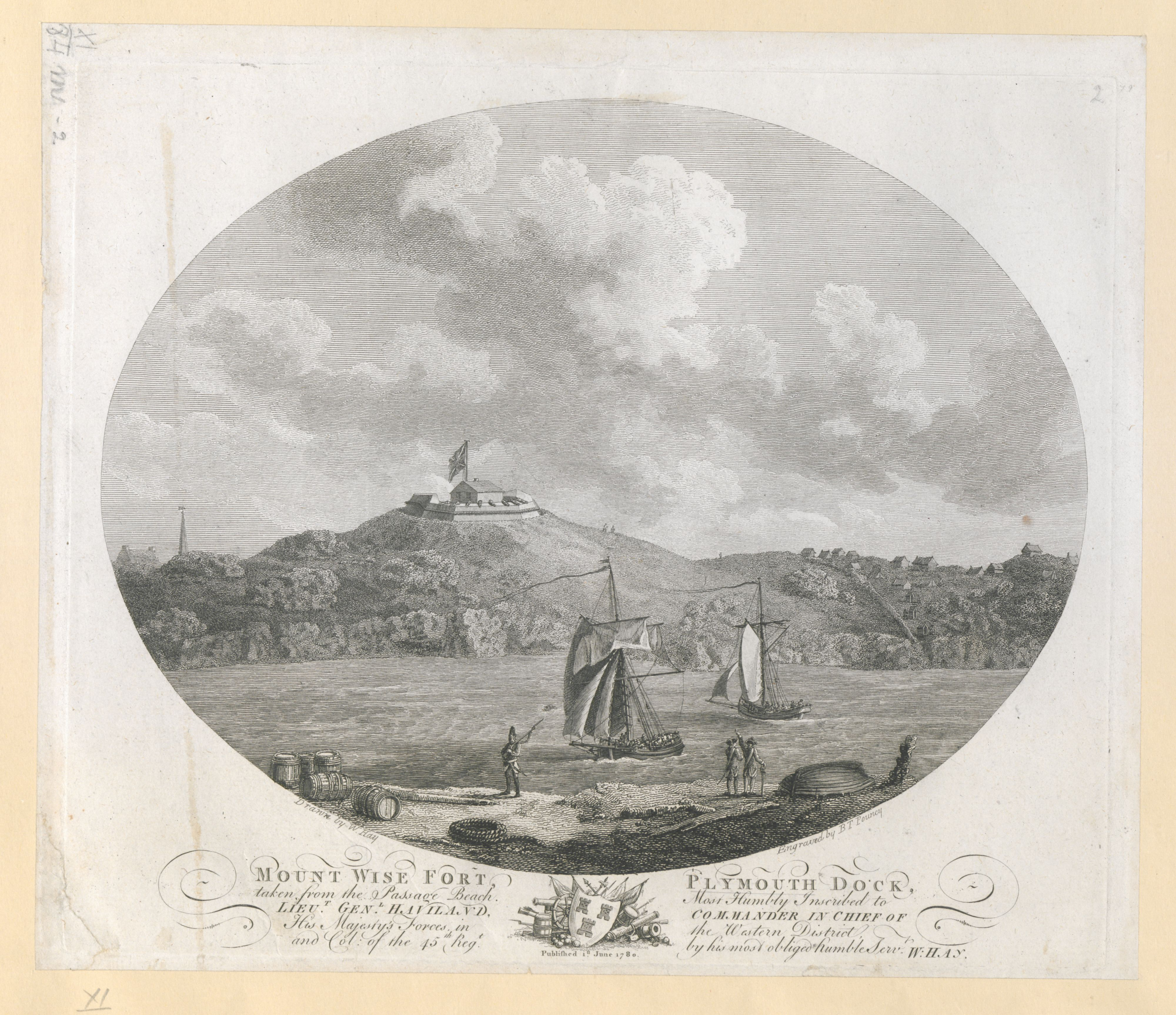
Mount Wise Fort, Plymouth Dock, by William Hay, 1780.

With the Devonport Lines protecting the Dockyard from landward attack, Mount Wise provided the key vantage point for defending against an attack from the sea. An octagonal redoubt with stone walls was built on Mount Wise in the 1770s, forming an emplacement designed to house guns for the purpose of defending the Royal Dockyard. In 1806 a semaphore signalling station was built within it, the last of a series of 32 linking Plymouth with the Admiralty in London. In the 1960s much of the structure was demolished, but many relics survive such as the external walls, semi-circular metal racer rails for the guns, World War II barage balloon anchoring rings, ammunition recesses and iron rings for manoeuvring the heavy guns. In 1998 a 40-metre-high (130 ft) mast was built, with circular viewing platform for recreational use by visitors, giving panoramic views, most notably westward to the Royal William Yard.

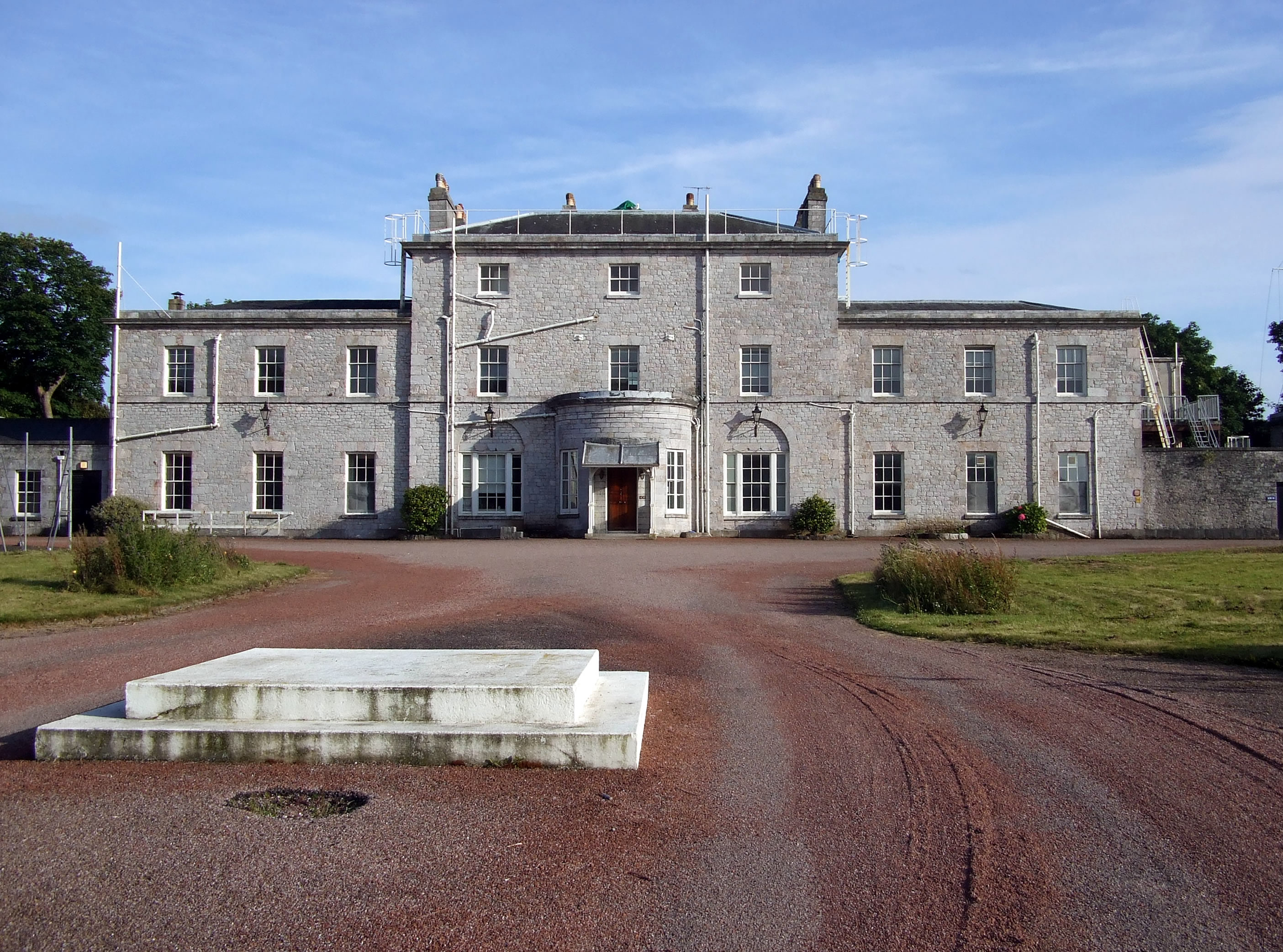
Government House (later known as Admiralty House) on Mount Wise: built in 1789–93, it initially served as home and headquarters of the military Governor of Plymouth.

In the late 18th century, at the height of fears of a French invasion following the French Revolution (1789), a large house was built on Mount Wise to house the military Governor of Plymouth. To the north, it faced the southernmost of the barracks (St George's Square) across a large parade ground; to the south, it was given a large garden extending towards the sea.

In 1804 an offshoot of the Royal Laboratory was set up on Mount Wise, just west of the redoubt, in buildings designed by Lewis Wyatt. The Royal Laboratory (established in Woolwich in the 17th century) was a department of the Board of Ordnance responsible for the manufacture and repair of small-arms ammunition. Between 1806 and 1814 some 70,000,000 cartridges were produced on Mount Wise and hundreds of men and boys were employed there; by the 1820s, the Napoleonic Wars having ended, the Laboratory had been reduced to a skeleton staff of five. In 1828, the Ordnance Board decided to close the Mount Wise Laboratory, citing the distance that had to be covered each day by the powder hoys that supplied the Laboratory with gunpowder from Keyham. By 1834 the Laboratory buildings had been converted into barracks accommodation and they remained in military use well into the 20th century.

== Admiralty use ==
Royal Naval Signal Station (established at Mount Wise in 1810).

Shortly before 1810 the estate together with the site of the Royal Dockyard was purchased by the Admiralty from Sir John St Aubyn, 5th Baronet (1758–1839), due to its strategic location, and became the Royal Navy's Maritime Headquarters. In the 19th-century it became the home of the Plymouth Garrison. The estate of Mount Wise was used by the Admiralty for about 200 years until it was abandoned in 2004 and was sold in 2006 by the Defence Estates for £5.5million. Security guards stop vandals from trespassing in the bunker buildings.

== Return to civilian usage ==
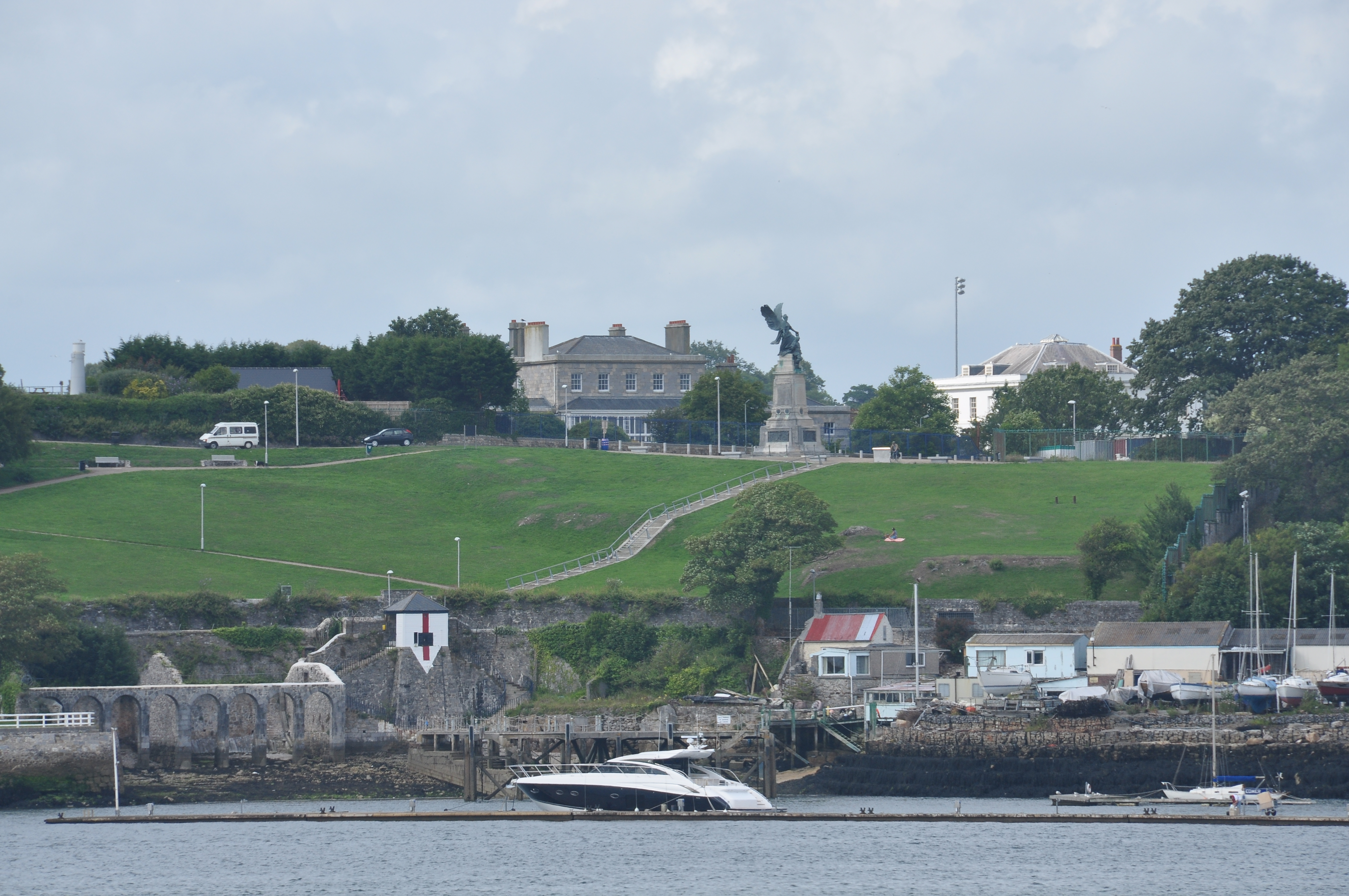
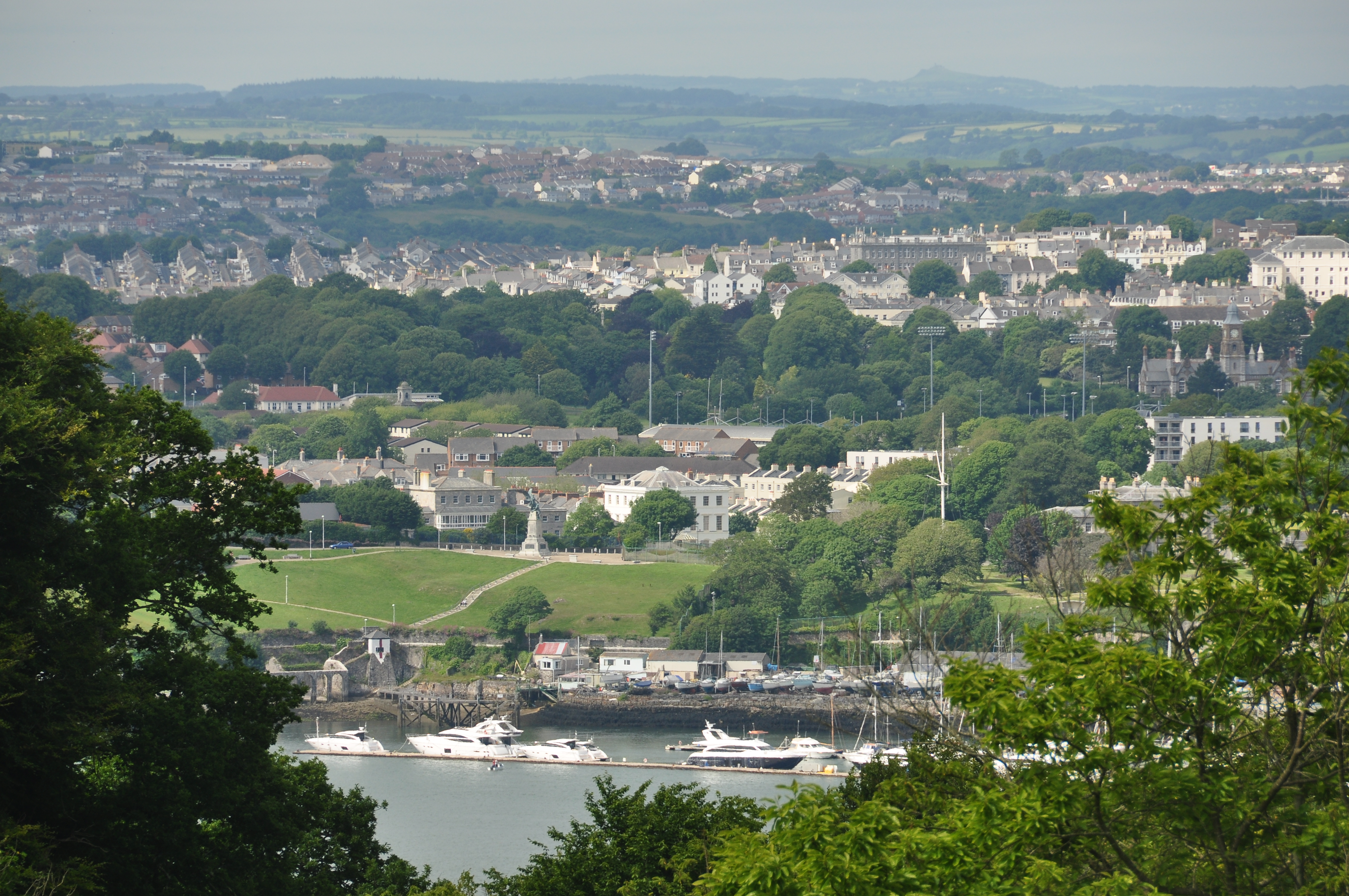
Mount Wise and the Scott Memorial, viewed from Mount Edgcumbe. Hamoaze House (centre left) and Admiralty House (far right, partly obscured by trees)

In 2011 the estate of Mount Wise comprising 28 acres of land started its phase one development as "The Village by the Sea", a residential area with 469 new houses, Admiralty House converted into a 21-bed "boutique hotel", 32,000 sq ft of offices, a 4,500 sq ft convenience store, the restoration of the former naval cricket pitch and pavilion and the nuclear bunker converted to a 50,000 sq ft data storage centre. The development advisor stated: "We are not trying to build a city centre development; we will be creating a waterside village". The new buildings were planned to have a "Georgian-inspired feel" with Admiralty House retained "as the figurehead of the scheme". Phase one ended in 2012, but sales of the new properties were slow due to the continued effects of the 2008 global recession.

The second phase of the development was due for completion in September 2015. Mount Wise House has been turned into offices, not the hotel as planned in phase one.

== Sources ==
- Pole, Sir William (d.1635), Collections Towards a Description of the County of Devon, Sir John-William de la Pole (ed.), London, 1791, p. 332, Stoke Damerell
- Risdon, Tristram (d.1640), Survey of Devon, 1811 edition, London, 1811, with 1810 Additions, pp. 207–8, Stoke
