= Edward Wise =

Edward Wise may refer to:

- Edward Wise (judge) (1818–1865), judge of the Supreme Court of New South Wales
- Edward Wise (died 1675) (1632–1675), English politician who sat in the House of Commons at various times between 1659 and 1675
- Frank Wise (British politician) (Edward Frank Wise, 1885–1933), British economist, civil servant and politician
