= Wulfnoth =

Wulfnoth is a masculine given name. Notable people with this name include:

- Wulfnoth Cild (died c. 1014), probable father of Godwin, Earl of Wessex
- Wulfnoth Godwinson (1040–1094), brother of Harold Godwinson, grandson of the above
