= John Sydenham (disambiguation) =

John Sydenham is a footballer.

John Sydenham may also refer to:

- John Sydenham (antiquary) English antiquarian (1807–1846)
- John Sydenham (14th-century MP), for Bridgwater (UK Parliament constituency)
- Sir John Sydenham, 2nd Baronet (1643–1696)
