= Sydenham House =

Sydenham House may refer to:

- Sydenham House, Devon, England
- Sydenham House, Essex County, New Jersey, United States
- Sydenham House, Somerset, England
