= Edward Wise (died 1675) =

English politician (1632–1675)

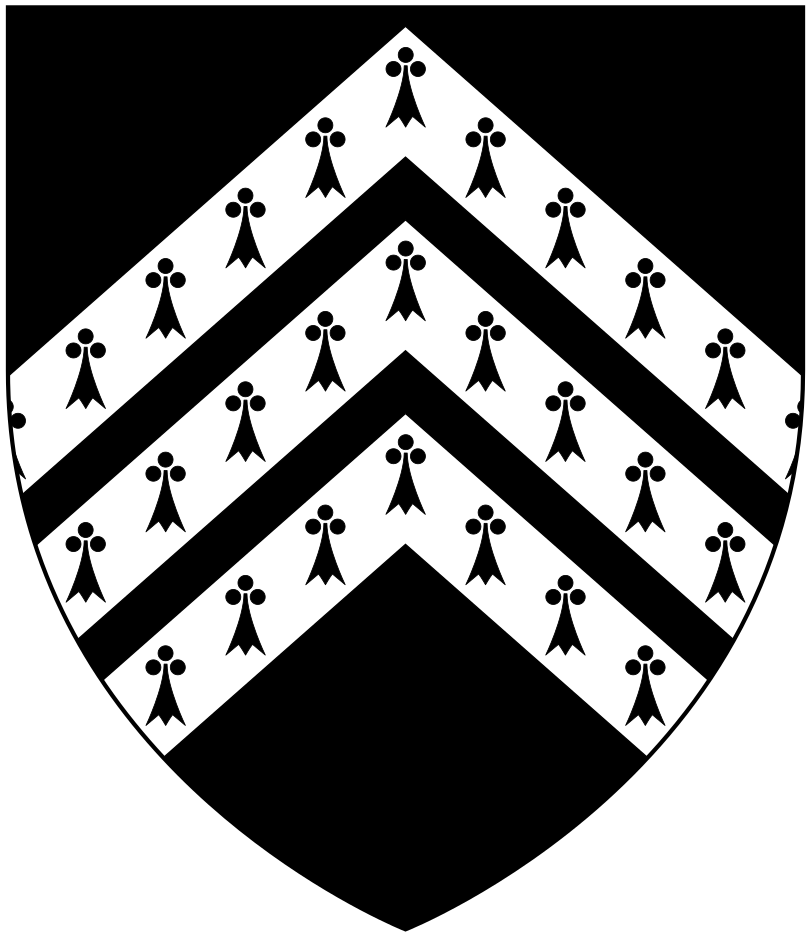
Arms of Wise of Sydenham: Sable, three chevronels ermine

Edward Wise (1632–1675) of Sydenham in the parish of Marystow in Devon, was a politician who sat in the House of Commons at various times between 1659 and 1675.

Wise was the son of Thomas Wise (c. 1605 – 1641) of Sydenham, MP, and was the grandson of Sir Thomas Wise (c. 1576 – 1630) of Sydenham, MP, and (via his mother) of Edward Chichester, 1st Viscount Chichester of Eggesford in Devon. In 1659 he was elected Member of Parliament for Okehampton in the Third Protectorate Parliament. He was elected in 1660 to the Convention Parliament. In 1661 he was re-elected MP for Okehampton for the Cavalier Parliament.

Parliament of England
Preceded by Not represented in Second Protectorate Parliament	Member of Parliament for Okehampton; 1659; With: Robert Everland	Succeeded by Not represented in Restored Rump
Preceded by Not represented in Restored Rump	Member of Parliament for Okehampton; 1660–1677; With: Josias Calmady 1660; Sir Thomas Hele, 1st Baronet 1661–1671; Sir Arthur Harris 1671–1677	Succeeded by Sir Arthur Harris; Henry Northleigh
