= Eadwold of Cerne =

9th-century English hermit

Saint Eadwold of Cerne

Saint, Hermit
- Born: c. 835 AD
- Died: 29 August c. 900; Cerne Abbas, Dorset, England
- Venerated in: Catholicism, Anglican Communion, Eastern Orthodox Church
- Major shrine: Cerne Abbey
- Feast: 29 August
- Patronage: Cerne

Eadwold of Cerne (c. 835 AD – 29 August c. 900), also known as Eadwold of East Anglia, was a 9th-century hermit, East Anglian prince and patron saint of Cerne, Dorset, who lived as a hermit on a hill about four miles from Cerne. His feast day is 29 August.

== Life ==
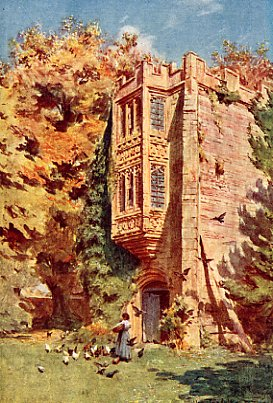
Cerne Abbey ruins.

Eadwold was born c. 835 AD, the son of Æthelweard of East Anglia and reputed brother of Edmund, king of East Anglia. He left his homeland possibly due to a Viking Invasion, to live as a hermit on a hill about four miles from Cerne, Dorset. William of Malmesbury said he lived on bread and water, and worked many miracles. He is known from the writing of William of Malmesbury and the Hagiographies of St Eadwold of Cerne, by Goscelin of Saint-Bertin and also the Secgan.

== Veneration ==
Eadwold died on 29 August c. 900, at Cerne and is said to have been buried in his cell, and was later moved to a nearby monastery, dedicated to St Peter. His veneration is credited with making Cerne Abbey the third richest in England during the 11th century.

A 2024 study proposed that the Cerne Abbas Giant was created c. 900 CE, depicting Hercules, as a muster station for West Saxon armies to gather but that by the 11th century, the figure was being reinterpreted by the monks at the Abbey as portraying Eadwold. Archaeologist Martin Papworth says the image, likely originally clothed, was probably of Eadwold pointing the way to Cerne Abbey.
