= Thomas Wise (died 1641) =

English politician

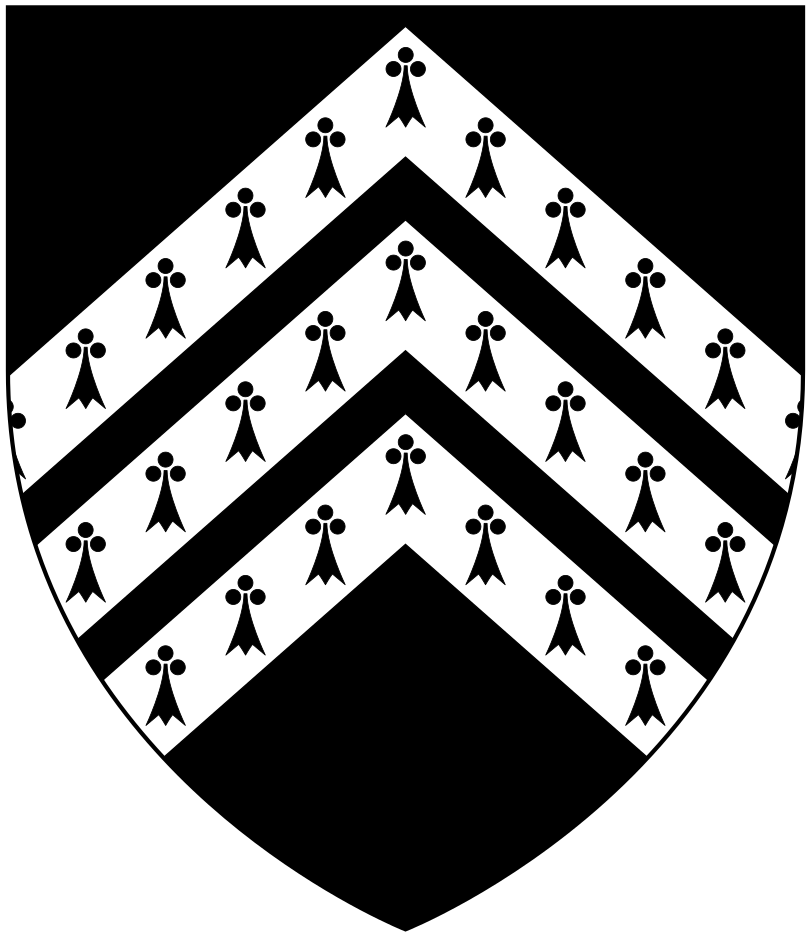
Arms of Wise of Sydenham: Sable, three chevronels ermine

Thomas Wise (c. 1605 – 18 March 1641) of Sydenham in Devon, was an English politician who sat in the House of Commons of England at various times between 1625 and 1641.

== Biography ==
Wise was the son of Sir Thomas Wise by his wife Margaret Stafford, daughter of Robert Stafford of Stowford, Devon. His father had been an MP and had built houses at Mount Wise at Stoke Damerel and at Sydenham. In 1625 Wise was nominated by Robert Rolle (died 1633) of Heanton Satchville, Petrockstowe, Devon, as a Member of Parliament for his pocket borough of Callington, which manor had been acquired by him in 1601. Thus in 1625 he served in the Useless Parliament. He was then elected MP for Bere Alston in the parliaments of King Charles of 1625, 1626 and 1628 to 1629. Wise inherited the family estates on the death of his father in 1629. He was High Sheriff of Devon in 1638.

In April 1640, Wise was elected Member of Parliament for Devon for the Short Parliament. He was re-elected in November 1640 for the Long Parliament but died in 1641. He was succeed as MP for Devon by his brother in law Sir Samuel Rolle.

Wise married Lady Mary Chichester, daughter of Edward Chichester, 1st Viscount Chichester of Carrickfergus in Ireland, of Eggesford in Devon, by whom he had two children:

- Edward Wise (1632–1675), of Sydenham, three times MP for Okehampton, 1659, 1660 and 1661–1675.
- Margery Wise, who married Sir John Molesworth, 2nd Baronet (1635–1716) of Pencarrow in Cornwall.

Parliament of England
Preceded by Sir Edward Seymour, 2nd Baronet; Henry Rolle	Member of Parliament for Callington; 1625; With: Richard Weston	Succeeded by Clipseus Crew; John Rolle
Preceded by William Strode; Sir Thomas Cheek	Member of Parliament for Bere Alston; 1625–1629; With: William Strode	Parliament suspended until 1640
Parliament suspended since 1629	Member of Parliament for Devon; 1640–1641; With: Sir Edward Seymour, 3rd Baronet	Succeeded by Sir Edward Seymour, 3rd Baronet; Sir Samuel Rolle
