= Thomas Wise (died 1630) =

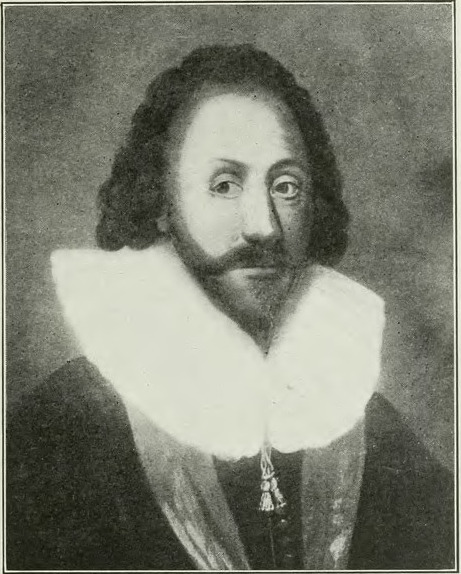
- Died: 1630
- Occupation: Politician
- Children: Thomas Wise
- Parent(s): Thomas Wise, of Sidenham; Mary Buller
- Position held: Member of Parliament in the Parliament of England, Member of the 1621-22 Parliament

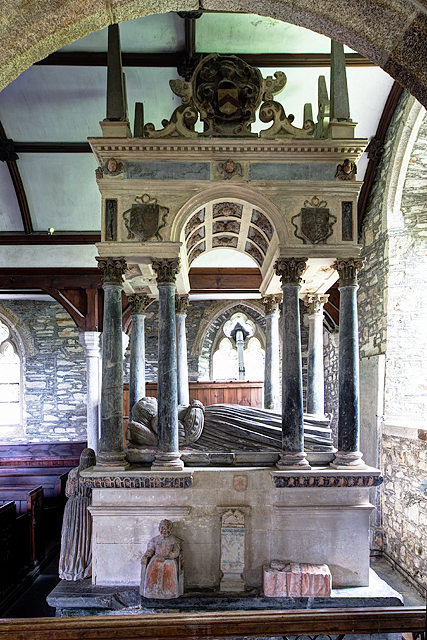
Monument to Sir Thomas Wise in St Mary's Church, Marystow

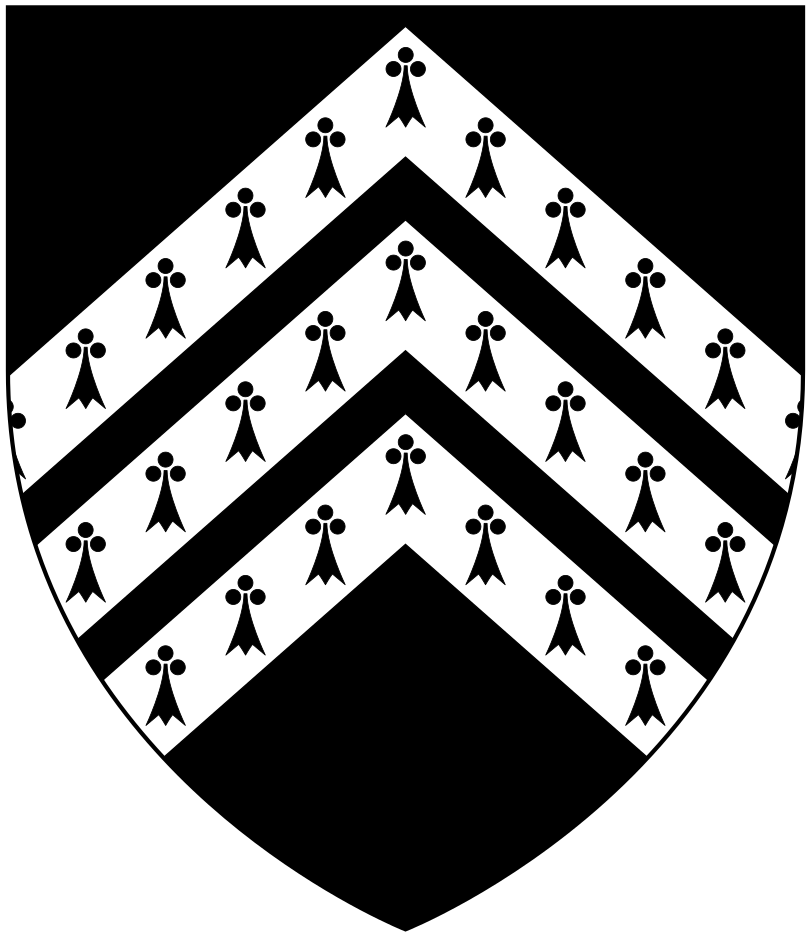
Arms of Wise of Sydenham: Sable, three chevronels ermine

Sir Thomas Wise (c. 1576–1630), KB, of Sydenham in the parish of Marystow and of Mount Wise in the parish of Stoke Damerel in Devon, was Sheriff of Devon in 1612 and in 1621 served as a member of parliament for Bere Alston in Devon.

== Origins ==
Wise was the second son and eventual heir of Thomas Wise (1546–1593) of Sydenham, by his wife Mary Buller, a daughter of Richard Buller (died 1556) of Shillingham in Cornwall (ancestor of the prominent Buller family of Morval and of the Buller Baronets). The Wise family is earliest recorded in the Heraldic Visitations of Devon in the person of John Wise (fl.1403) of Sydenham, living in 1403. The family can however be traced to Westcountry roots from the eleventh century. They provided a Knight of the Shire (Member of Parliament for Devon) in three of the Parliaments of King Henry VI (1422–1461). In about 1400 the manor of Stoke Damerel, within which was situated the estate later called Mount Wise, was inherited by Thomas Wise of Sydenham (son and heir of John Wise (fl. 1403) of Sydenham), upon his marriage to Margaret Brett (alias Brit), daughter and heiress of Robert Brett of Staddiscombe, near Plymstock, lord of the manor of Stoke Damerel.

== Career ==
He was created a Knight of the Bath at the coronation of King James I in 1603. In 1612 he served as Sheriff of Devon. In 1621 he was elected a member of parliament for Bere Alston in Devon, where he had gained influence following local land purchases.

He re-built Sydenham House and added such height and such a great amount of stone to it that his contemporary Risdon (died 1640) described Sydenham as:

"Beautified with buildings of such height as the very foundation is ready to reel under the burthen".

He also built a new mansion house on his ancestral estate at Stoke Damerel, which he named Mount Wise, on a headland jutting out into Plymouth Sound. His contemporary the Devon historian Sir William Pole (died 1635) remarked as follows concerning the manor of Stoke Damerel and Sir Thomas Wise:

"Hee hath bwilded heere, uppon an advanced ground a newe howse for his pleasure & named it Mount Wise, where Thomas (Wise) Esqr. his sonne now dwelleth, w(hi)ch hath married (Mary), daughter of Edward Lord Chichester, Vicont of Cairfergus".

== Marriage and children ==
In about 1600 Wise married Margery Stafford (born 1583), daughter and sole heiress of Robert Stafford (died 1604) of Stafford (alias Stoford) in the parish of Dolton in Devon. The surname of the Stafford family had anciently been Kelloway. By his wife he had children as follows:

- Thomas Wise (c. 1605 – 1641), only son and heir, Sheriff of Devon in 1638 and in 1625 a member of parliament for the Rolle pocket borough of Callington in Cornwall (nominated by Robert Rolle (died 1633) of Heanton Satchville, Petrockstowe, Devon, the father-in-law of his sister Margery Wise) and for Bere Alston in the parliaments of King Charles of 1625, 1626 and 1628 to 1629, and for Devon twice in 1640. As Pole states (see above), he married Lady Mary Chichester, daughter of Edward Chichester, 1st Viscount Chichester of Carrickfergus in Ireland and of Eggesford in Devon.
- Margery Wise, who married Sir Samuel Rolle (died 1647), (c. 1588 – 1647) of Heanton Satchville in the parish of Petrockstowe, Devon, Member of Parliament for Callington, Cornwall in 1640 and for Devon 1641–1647, a prominent Parliamentarian during the Civil War.
- Elizabeth Wise, unmarried at her father's death in 1630, to whom he bequeathed a generous £3,500 dowry. She married in 1634 John Browne of Frampton.

== Death and burial ==
Wise died in 1630 and was buried in Marystow Church, where survives his "splendid" marble monument with eight Corinthian columns surrounded by other monuments to the Wise family.

Parliament of England
Preceded by Thomas Crewe; Sir Richard White	Member of Parliament for Bere Alston; 1621–1622; With: Thomas Keightley	Succeeded by Wiliam Strode; Thomas Keightley
