= Rodney Legg =

- Born: 18 April 1947; Bournemouth
- Died: 22 July 2011 (aged 64)
- Education: Winton Boys School
- Occupations: Campaigner, author and publisher
- Partner: Di Hooley
- Relatives: Ted and Gladys

Rodney Frank Legg (18 April 1947 – 22 July 2011) was a campaigner, author and publisher, known for being chairman of the Open Spaces Society and for publishing numerous works on the history and landscape of Dorset, England.

== Early life ==
Legg was born in Bournemouth on 18 April 1947. His parents, Ted and Gladys, were of Dorset ancestry, and had one older son. Legg attended primary school in Charminster, then Winton Boys School until age 16. As an adolescent he joined the League of Empire Loyalists, in which he participated for seven years, including making flag-waving protests at Conservative and Labour party conferences.

== Career ==
After leaving school with five O-levels, Legg's first job was for the Basildon Standard in Essex, as a reporter. After four years he returned to Dorset and founded Dorset: The County Magazine in 1968, which later became Dorset Life.

Legg led a campaign to restore public access to the army-occupied Lulworth Ranges in south Dorset, including the village of Tyneham that had been evacuated by command of the War Office in 1943 and never returned to its former residents. Known as the Tyneham Action Group, this campaign – founded by Legg in 1967 – eventually resulted in weekend access to ten square miles of land that were also secured from being ploughed or developed.

Having joined the Open Spaces Society at age 16, Legg became treasurer in 1981 and chairman in 1989. He believed that all land should be publicly accessible; he opened Steep Holm island in Somerset to public access, after helping to buy it in 1976 in memory of his friend Kenneth Allsop. Legg was the island's warden for 25 years. In 1990 Legg became the Open Spaces Society's appointee on the council of the National Trust. He was critical of the Trust, calling it "an elitist club for art connoisseurs", and sought to change it from within. His complaint, based on years of experience of finding Trust land blocked to public access, caused debate in the national press.

Legg published 125 books, including a collaborative edition – with author John Fowles – of John Aubrey's Monumenta Britannica (1980–1982).

== Personal life ==
Legg's partner was Di Hooley.

Legg died from cancer on 22 July 2011, age 64.
