= Sydenham railway station =

Sydenham railway station may refer to:

- Sydenham railway station (Northern Ireland)
- Sydenham railway station (London)
- Sydenham Hill railway station
- Sydenham railway station, Sydney
- Watergardens railway station, Melbourne, renamed from Sydenham to tie in with the adjacent shopping centre.
