= John Sydenham (antiquary) =

John Sydenham (25 September 1807– 1 December 1846) was an English antiquary. In 1829 he became editor of the Dorset County Chronicle. In 1840 Sydenham left the Dorset Chronicle and became editor of The West Kent Guardian, a Greenwich paper. In January 1846 he returned to Poole and started The Poole and Dorsetshire Herald, of which he was editor and part-proprietor. He was one of the early members of the British Archæological Association.

== Works ==
In 1839 Sydenham published The History of the Town and County of Poole (Poole). In 1841 he wrote Baal Durotrigensis (London), a dissertation on the Cerne Abbas Giant, in which he endeavoured to discriminate between the primal Celtæ and the later Celto-Belgæ, who emigrated from Gaul.

== Personal ==
Sydenham was the eldest son of John Sydenham, a bookseller of Poole, Dorset, born on 25 September 1807. He was educated in his native town. In 1833 he married Anne Christiana Zillwood, a daughter of William Zillwood, a schoolmaster of Dorchester, by whom he had six children. He died at Poole on 1 December 1846.
