= Cerne Abbey =

Abbey in Cerne Abbas, United Kingdom

Coordinates: 50.8106°N 2.4754°W

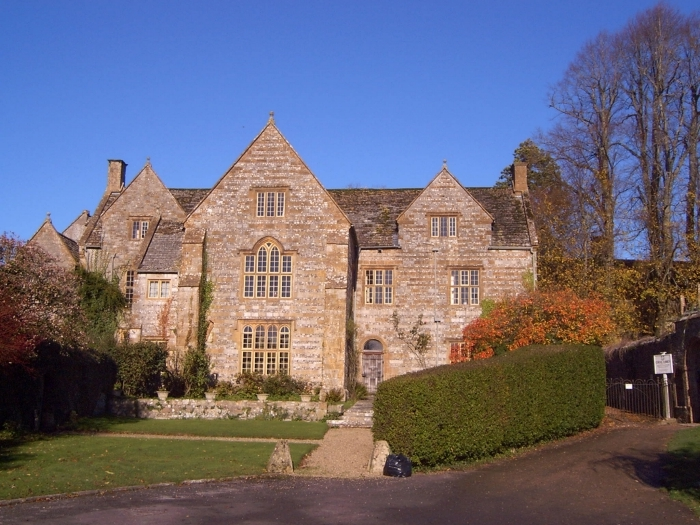
Abbey House

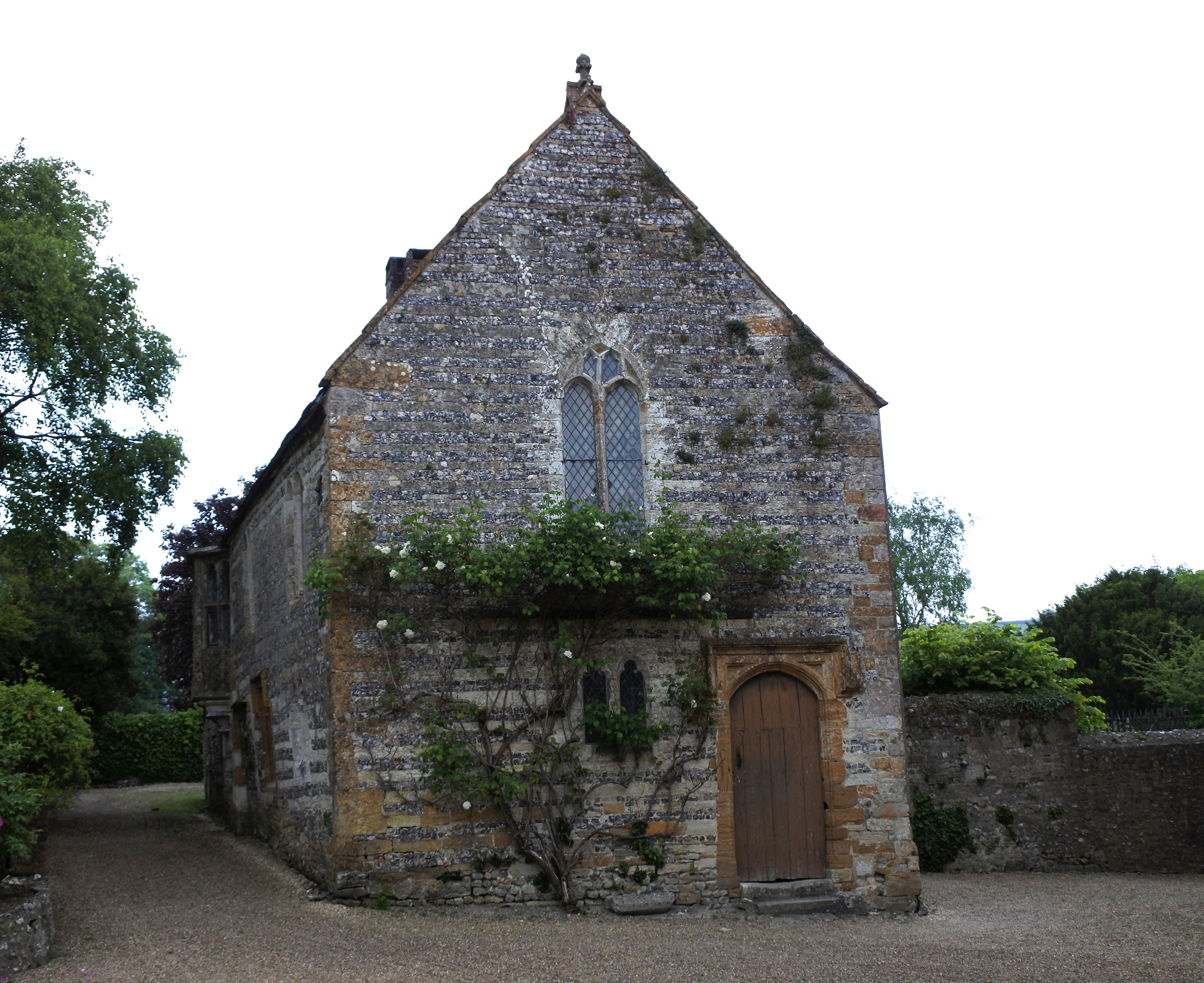
Abbey Guest House

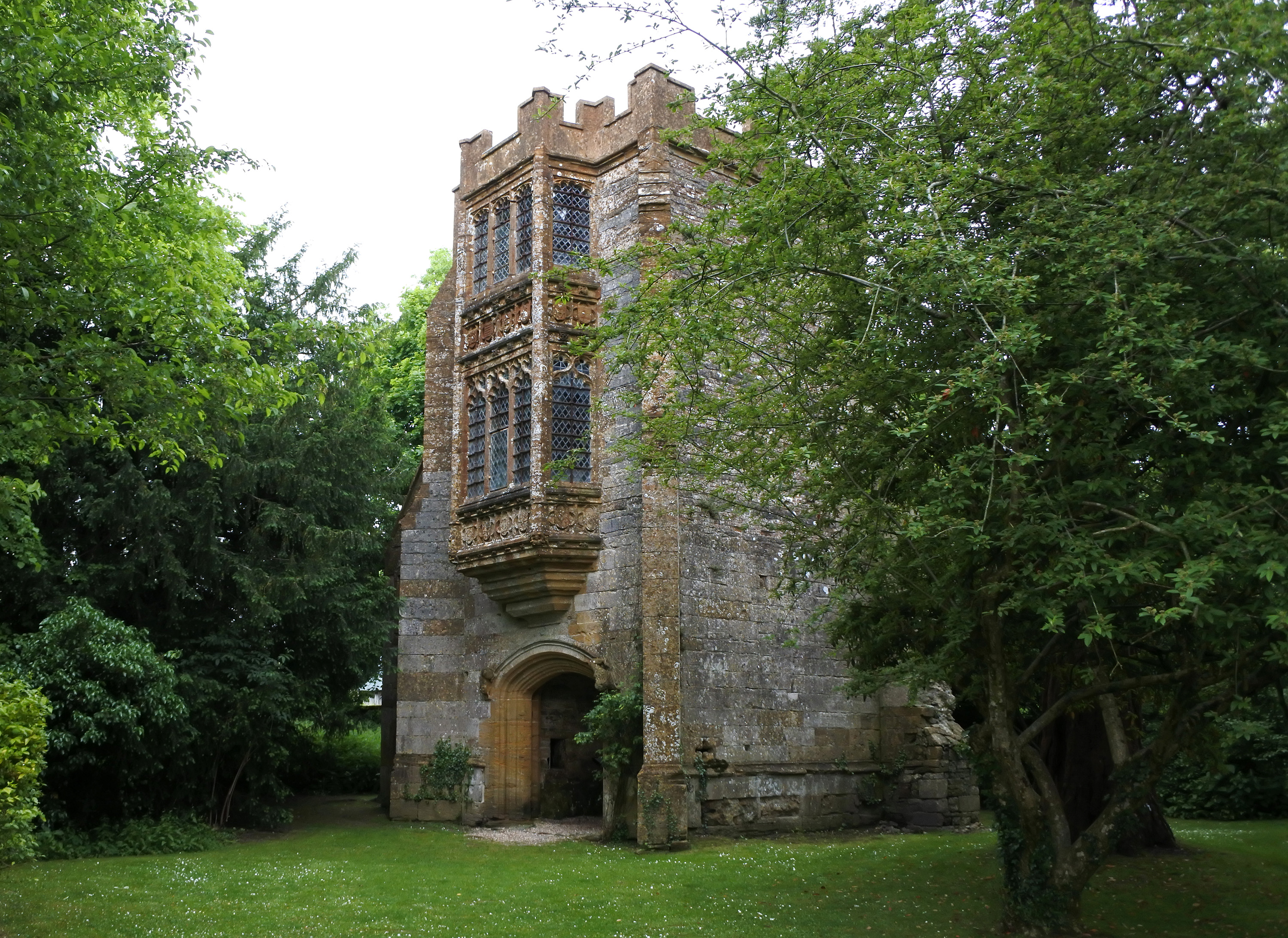
Abbot's Porch

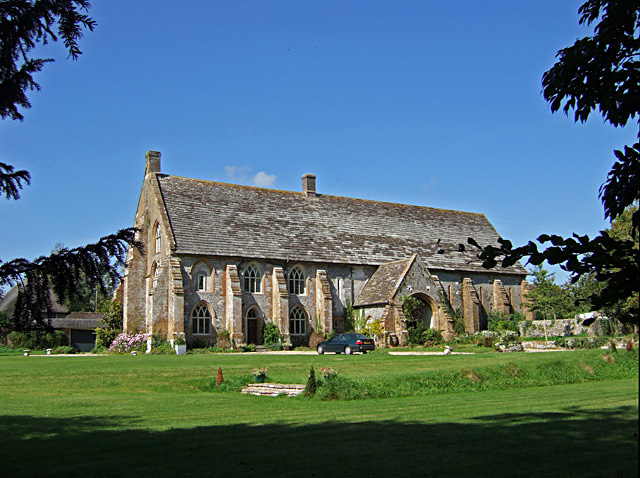
Tithe barn

Cerne Abbey was a Benedictine monastery founded in 987 in the town now called Cerne Abbas, Dorset, by Æthelmær the Stout.

== History ==
The abbey was founded in 987 by Æthelmær the Stout. Ælfric of Eynsham, the most prolific writer in Old English, spent time at the abbey as a monk and teacher.

King Cnut plundered this monastery during an attack upon the town, but afterwards became a benefactor of it.

By the time of the Domesday Book, the abbey had added substantially to its endowment. Much of this wealth has been credited to the veneration of Saint Eadwold of Cerne, a 9th-century hermit reputedly a brother of Edmund, king of East Anglia. Eadwold lived as a hermit on a hill about four miles from Cerne.

The later history appears to have been relatively uneventful; A History of the County of Dorset says that its history is "perhaps the least eventful of any of the Dorset houses with the exception of that of the sisters at Tarrant Kaines". The abbey's history ended on a less positive note, with the last abbot, Thomas Corton, accused of various offences including that of allowing the abbey and lands to become ruinous, and of keeping a mistress who seems to have borne him children. The accusations were taken seriously enough to warrant inspection by commissioners, and the abbey was closed in 1539.

Following Dissolution of the Monasteries, the buildings were mainly demolished. Abbey House, a Grade I listed building, occupies the site of the gatehouse and incorporates parts of it. Most of the house dates from after a fire in the middle of the 18th century in which the gatehouse was seriously damaged. The late 15th-century Guest House of the abbey is also Grade I listed, as is the very elaborate stone vaulted porch of the abbot's hall, built around 1500, which survives in the midst of a wooded lawn, with a Grade II* listed, early 16th century barn lying to its north. A Grade I listed, 14th-century tithe barn, converted to a house in the late 18th century, lies to its east.

== Abbots of Cerne ==
- Ælfric, appointed about 987, on the refoundation of Cerne as a Benedictine monastery
- Alfric Puttoc, occurs 1023
- Withelmus, occurs 1085
- Haimo, deposed 1102 for simony
- William, occurs 1121
- Bernard, became abbot of Burton in 1160
- Robert, occurs 1166
- Dionysius, occurs 1206, resigned 1220
- R., elected 1220
- William de Hungerford, elected 1232
- Richard de Suwell or Sawel, elected 1244, died 1260
- Philip, elected 1260
- Thomas de Ebblesbury, elected 1274
- Gilbert de Minterne, elected 1296, died 1312
- Ralph de Cerne, elected 1312, died 1324
- Richard de Osmington, elected 1324
- Stephen Sherrard, elected 1356
- Thomas Sewale, elected 1361, died 1382
- John de Hayle, elected 1382, died in same year
- Robert Symondsbury, elected 1382
- John Wede, elected 1411, died 1427
- John Winterborne, elected 1427, died 1436
- John Godmanston, elected 1436, died 1451
- William Cattistoke, elected 1451, died 1454
- John Helyer, elected 1454, resigned 1458
- John Vanne, elected 1458, died 1471
- Roger Bemyster, elected 1471, died 1497
- Thomas Sam, elected 1497, died 1509
- Robert Westbury, elected 1510, died 1524
- Thomas Corton, elected 1524, surrendered his abbey 1539
