= Marystow =

Village in Devon, England

Coordinates: 50°37′N 4°13′W

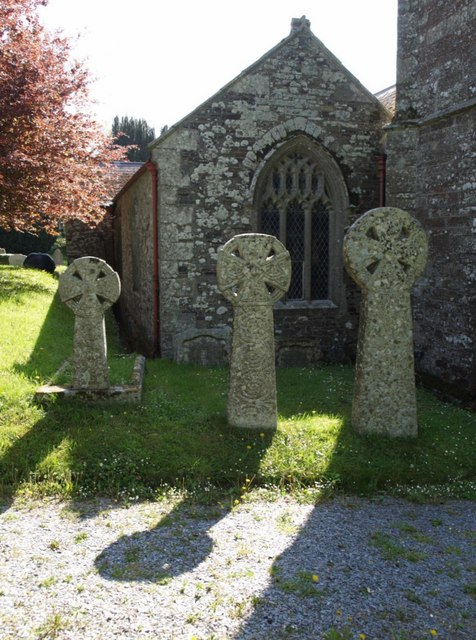
Celtic crosses at Marystow

Marystow or Stow-St. Mary was a village and parish in the Tavistock district of Devon, England.

St Mary's church is medieval. The chancel was built in the early 14th century. The west tower and the north aisle are Perpendicular. In 1824 the tower was partly rebuilt. The font is Norman. There is an ambitious monument to Sir Thomas Wyse who died in 1629.

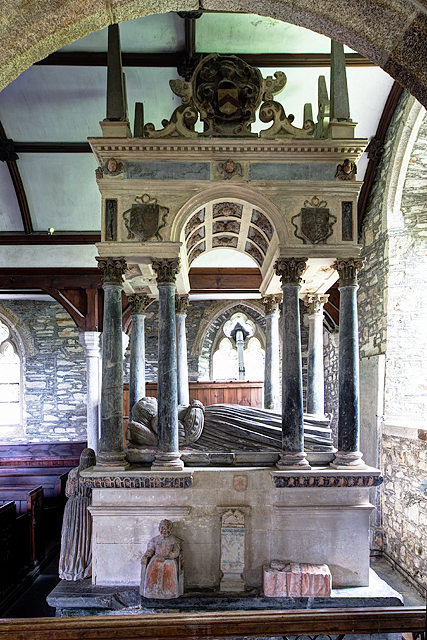
The monument to Sir Thomas Wyse
