= Ivybridge Town Hall =

Municipal building in Ivybridge, Devon, England

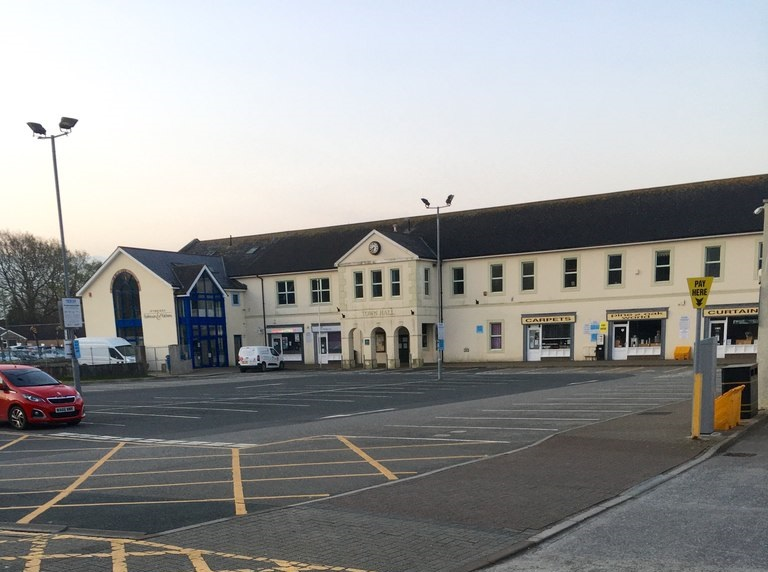
- The building in 2020

- Shown in Devon
- 50.3889°N 3.9191°W
- Location: Erme Court, Ivybridge

History
- Built: c.1995

Site notes
- Architectural style: Neoclassical style

Ivybridge Town Hall is a municipal building at Erme Court in Ivybridge, a town in Devon, in England. It serves as the meeting place of Ivybridge Town Council.

== History ==
=== The old town hall ===
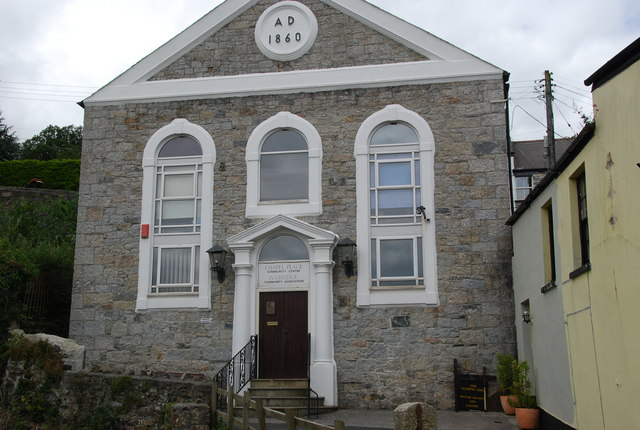
The Old Town Hall in Chapel Place

The first municipal building in Ivybridge was the old chapel in Chapel Place which was commissioned by the local Methodists and erected on land donated by the lord of the manor, Sir John Rogers, 6th Baronet. It was designed in the Italianate style, built in rubble masonry and was completed in 1812. It was enlarged at the expense of the owner of Stowford Paper Mills, John Allen, in 1860. The design involved a symmetrical main frontage of three bays facing down Chapel Place towards Fore Street. The central bay featured a doorway with a semi-circular fanlight flanked by Doric order columns supporting an open pediment; there was a round headed window on the first floor. The outer bays were fenestrated by tall round headed windows. The gable across the frontage contained a circular plaque, which was inscribed with the year "A. D. 1860". After the Methodist congregation moved to a larger church in Fore Street in 1874, the old chapel was used a magistrates' court and then as a town hall. Since 1994, it has served as the Chapel Place Community Centre, which is managed by the Ivybridge Community Association.

Following significant population growth, largely associated with the paper industry, a local board of health was established in Ivybridge in 1873. The local board of health was succeeded by Ivybridge Urban District Council in 1894. Although civic leaders used the building for public meetings, it ceased to serve any municipal purpose after the area came under the administration of Plympton St Mary Rural District Council, which was based in Plympton, in 1935.

=== The new town hall ===
After the Ivybridge Relief Road was opened in June 1994, the area between the new road and the River Erme, which had been occupied by open fields, became available for development. The newly established Ivybridge Town Council decided to commission a dedicated town hall. The new building was designed in the neoclassical style, built in brick with a stucco finish and was completed in around 1995.

The design involved an asymmetrical main frontage of eleven bays facing north towards Erme Court. The third bay on the left featured a full height portico, with three round-headed openings on the ground floor, three sash windows on the first floor and a pediment containing a clock in the tympanum. The left hand section of two bays was fenestrated by shop fronts on the ground floor and by cross-windows on the first floor, while the right-hand section of eight bays was fenestrated by shop fronts on the ground floor and by sash windows on the first floor. Internally, the principal room was the council chamber on the first floor. An extension, which was projected forward and commissioned to accommodate a local business, Ivybridge Bathrooms and Kitchens, was erected at the east end of the complex in around 2007.
