= The Days (band) =

British pop band

- Origin: Ivybridge, Devon, United Kingdom
- Years active: 2005–2009
- Labels: Atlantic
- Past members: Luke Simpkins; Harry Meads; Dan Simpkins; Tim Ayers

The Days were a British pop band, formed in 2005, originating from Ivybridge, Devon, UK.

== History ==
Formed in 2005, the band's lineup was brothers Luke (vocals, piano) & Dan Simpkins (bass guitar), and Harry Meads (drums). After the members went to university in London and built up a fan base, and were joined in 2007 by guitarist Tim Ayers. All the members had attended the same school, Ivybridge Community College. After gaining interest from several record companies they were signed by Atlantic Records.

In November 2007, they released an EP, Evil Girls. This was followed by singles "No Ties" and "Never Give Up". "No Ties" peaked at number 91 on the UK Singles Chart.

They toured as a support act for Paolo Nutini, The Fray, Supergrass, Elliot Minor, and Scouting for Girls, and headlined their own UK tour in 2009. In the same year, they visited Droitwich Spa High School.

They recorded an album in 2008 at Grouse Lodge with producers John Cornfield and Youth, but it was not released.

On 16 November 2009 they announced that Ayers had left the band but that they would continue as a three-piece band.

The band cited The Beatles, The Eagles, and Ben Folds as influences.

== Discography ==
- "Evil Girls" EP (2007), Atlantic
- "Atlantic Skies" EP (2008), Atlantic
- "No Ties" (16 February 2009), Atlantic
- "Never Give Up" (4 May 2009), Atlantic
- "3 Track EP" (2009), WMG / East West Records Ltd

== Band members ==
- Luke Simpkins – vocals, piano, guitar (2005–2009)
- Dan Simpkins – bass (2005–2009)
- Tim Ayers – guitar (2006–2009)
- Harry Meads – drums (2005–2009)
