= Ivybridge =

Town in Devon, England

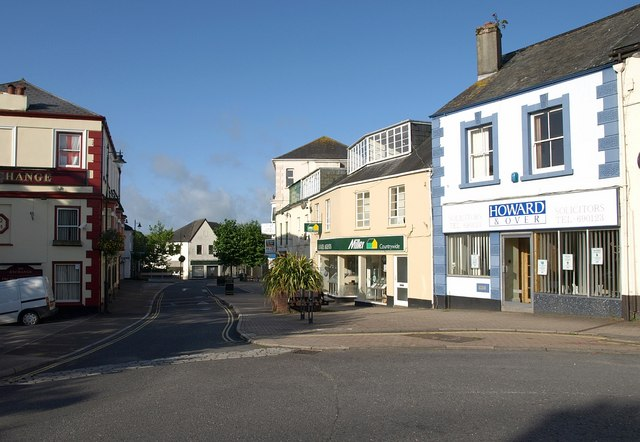
- Fore Street, Ivybridge

- Location within Devon
- Population: 11,851 (2011)
- OS grid reference: SX635560
  - London: 182 mi (293 km)
- Civil parish: Ivybridge
- District: South Hams
- Shire county: Devon
- Region: South West
- Country: England
- Sovereign state: United Kingdom
- Post town: IVYBRIDGE
- Postcode district: PL21
- Dialling code: 01752
- Police: Devon and Cornwall
- Fire: Devon and Somerset
- Ambulance: South Western
- UK Parliament: South West Devon
- Website: ivybridge.gov.uk

Ivybridge /ˈaɪvibrɪdʒ/ is a town and civil parish in the South Hams, in Devon, England. It lies about thirteen miles (twenty-one kilometres) east of Plymouth. It is at the southern extremity of Dartmoor, a National Park of England and Wales and lies along the A38 "Devon Expressway" road. There are two electoral wards in Ivybridge East and Ivybridge West with a total population of 11,851.

Mentioned in documents as early as the 13th century, Ivybridge's early history is marked by its status as an important crossing-point over the River Erme on the road from Exeter to Plymouth. In the 16th century mills were built using the River Erme's power. The parish of Saint John was formed in 1836. Ivybridge became a civil parish in 1894 and a town in 1977.

The early urbanisation and development of Ivybridge largely coincided with the Industrial Revolution. Stowford Paper Mill was built in 1787 and rebuilt again in the 1860s with extensive investment. In 1848 the South Devon Railway arrived on the northern edge of the village. The paper mill closed in 2013 after 226 years in Ivybridge and the buildings are being converted to homes and shops. Ivybridge is often referred to as a commuter town, although a small proportion of people work in the town itself, and agriculture continues to play an economic role for the surrounding area. The area surrounding Ivybridge is varied and complex, including river valleys, farmland and dense woodland.

While heavy industry diminished during the latter half of the 20th century, the population grew significantly from 1,574 people in 1921 to 12,056 in 2001.

== History ==
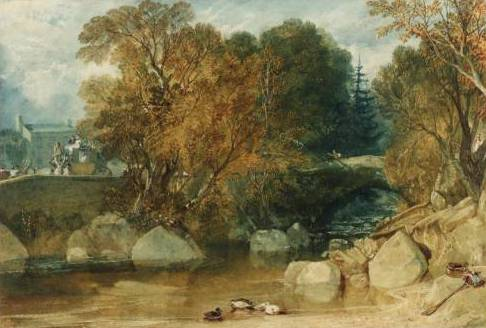
The Ivy Bridge as painted by J. M. W. Turner in 1813

The name Ivybridge is derived from a small 13th century hump-backed bridge of the same name. The Ivy Bridge was the only means of crossing the river until the 1830s although plans were put forward in 1819. "Ivy" was used to describe the bridge, because there was ivy growing along the bridge. As the bridge was the centre of the village and important to its very existence, it was named the "parish of Ivybridge" in 1894.

The first mention of a settlement in the Ivybridge area was the manor of Stowford in the Domesday Book of 1086. Although the first mention of Ivybridge came in 1280 when it was described as "dowry of land on the west side of the River Erme, by the Ivy Bridge." There was once a chapel, that was on the site of present-day Saint John's Church, originating from 1402. From the 16th century onwards mills were built in the town, harnessing the power of the river. Records show that in the 16th century there was a corn mill, a tin mill and an edge mill. One of the mills, 'Glanville's Mill' (a corn mill), was situated where many of the town shops are today and gives its name to the shopping centre. The first church (Saint John's) was built in 1790 as a chapel of ease, but 45 years later in 1835 it was consecrated as a district church. The oldest burial in St John's church yard is from 1836. In the 1830s the Ivy Bridge lost its position as the only means of crossing the river when the 'New Bridge' was built joining Fore Street and Exeter Road. Today, this bridge has been modernised so as to carry the increased weight and traffic of the 21st century. Stowford Mill is depicted on a commemorative coin produced for the town of Ivybridge by Bigbury Mint Ltd, based in Ermington near the town. The 25 mm diameter coin also features the town's viaduct which stands at an impressive 104 feet high. The coin was first struck circa 2005 by Bigbury Mint.

In 1977 Ivybridge became a town. Throughout the 1980s and 1990s it underwent a period of rapid growth and was designated as the fastest growing town in Europe, the construction of the A38 "Devon Expressway" adjacent to the town significantly contributed to the town growth during this period.

== Governance ==
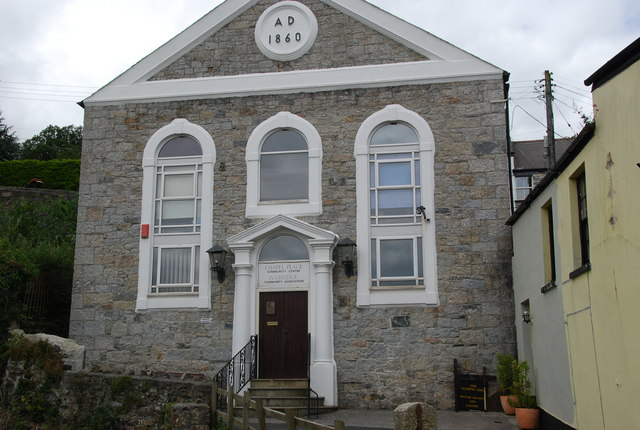
The old town hall at Chapel Place

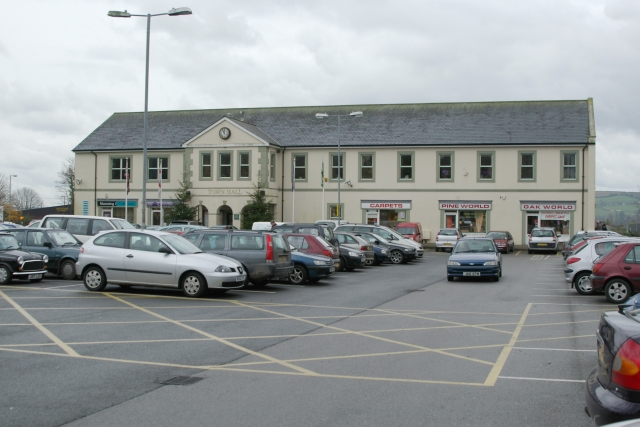
The new town hall at Erme Court

Ivybridge is represented by five tiers of elected government.

- Ivybridge Town Council forms the lowest tier of local government. Ivybridge town council consists of sixteen council members who are elected from two wards, Ivybridge East and Ivybridge West. The council members are elected every four years and a town mayor is elected every year by the town council members. The town council is responsible for the provision of a number of local services including the management of parks, open spaces, cemeteries and allotments. A committee of the town council reviews all planning applications and makes recommendations to the District Council, which is the planning authority for the town. The town council also represents the views of the town on issues such as local transport, policing and the environment. The town council raises its own tax to pay for these services, known as the parish precept, which is collected as part of the Council Tax. The old town hall in Chapel Place is close to the centre of the town, while the new town hall is at Erme Court.
- The next tier is South Hams District Council. They take care of matters such as local planning and building control, local roads, council housing, environmental health, markets and fairs, refuse collection and recycling, cemeteries and crematoria, leisure services, parks and tourism.
- The next tier is Devon County Council, who take care of matters such as education, social services, libraries, main roads, public transport, policing and fire service, trading standards, waste disposal and strategic planning.
- The Parliament of the United Kingdom is responsible for matters such as education, health and justice.

The town is divided into two wards: Ivybridge East (the half of the parish lying east of the River Erme, plus some of the town's eastward expansion into Ugborough parish) and Ivybridge West (the half of the parish west of the river).

Until 1894, Ivybridge was made up of four neighbouring parishes: Harford – two miles (three kilometres) north; Ugborough – 2 1/2 mi (4 km) east; Ermington – 2 mi (3 km) south; and Cornwood – 3 mi (5 km) northwest. All the parishes' boundaries met at the Ivy Bridge. In 1836 the parish of Saint John was formed (the name of the church at the time, which was dedicated to John the Evangelist). The parish represented the small central area of present-day Ivybridge. In 1894, St John's became a parish church for the newly created parish of Ivybridge. 83 years later the village and civil parish of Ivybridge became a town in 1977. Its local government district has been the South Hams since 1 April 1974.

For Westminster elections, the town forms part of the county constituency of South West Devon. The seat has been held since 2024 by Rebecca Smith for the Conservatives, having previously been held by Gary Streeter for the Conservatives since its creation from Plymouth Sutton and South Hams in 1997.

== International links ==
Ivybridge's first official twinning was with Saint-Pierre-sur-Dives in 1972, before Ivybridge became a town. Since then, it has developed unofficial town twinnings (exchanges) and friendship treaties:

- France: Saint-Pierre-sur-Dives, Lower Normandy, since 1972
- Germany: Beverungen, North Rhine-Westphalia, since 1975 (then in West Germany)
- United States: Bedford, Virginia, since 2004

== Geography ==
At coordinates 50°23′28″N 3°55′12″W Ivybridge is situated deep in the south western peninsula of England, Ivybridge is 182 miles (293 kilometres) from London, 10 miles (16 km) from Totnes and 28 miles (45 km) from Exeter. The main road in and out of the town (the A38) allows fast access to its nearby city Plymouth for many of Ivybridge's commuters.

The topography of Ivybridge is generally hilly. This is because of the River Erme which flows right through the centre of town. To the east and to the west of the river the land is elevated forming a valley. The river first enters the town at 300 feet (91 m) above sea level and leaves the town at 130 feet (40 m) above sea level. At its height the top of the east and west of the valley is 260 feet (79 m) above sea level. The western beacon is a hill that overlooks the town; its peak can be seen from almost anywhere in the town. It is 1,076 feet (328 m) above sea level and 912 feet (278 m) above the town. There is also an area of woodland called Longtimber Woods to the north of the town, which attracts many walkers along its riverside path.

The geology of Ivybridge is varied. Throughout most of the town the rock is Old Red Sandstone (correction:this should read ‘heat-altered slates), (sedimentary) from the Devonian period. To the north of the town Granite can be found as it is situated on the slopes of Dartmoor – a large pre-volcanic area of Granite. Along the River Erme large boulders and rocks can be found deposited on its meandering path brought all the way from Dartmoor; the Ivy Bridge itself is made out of Granite.

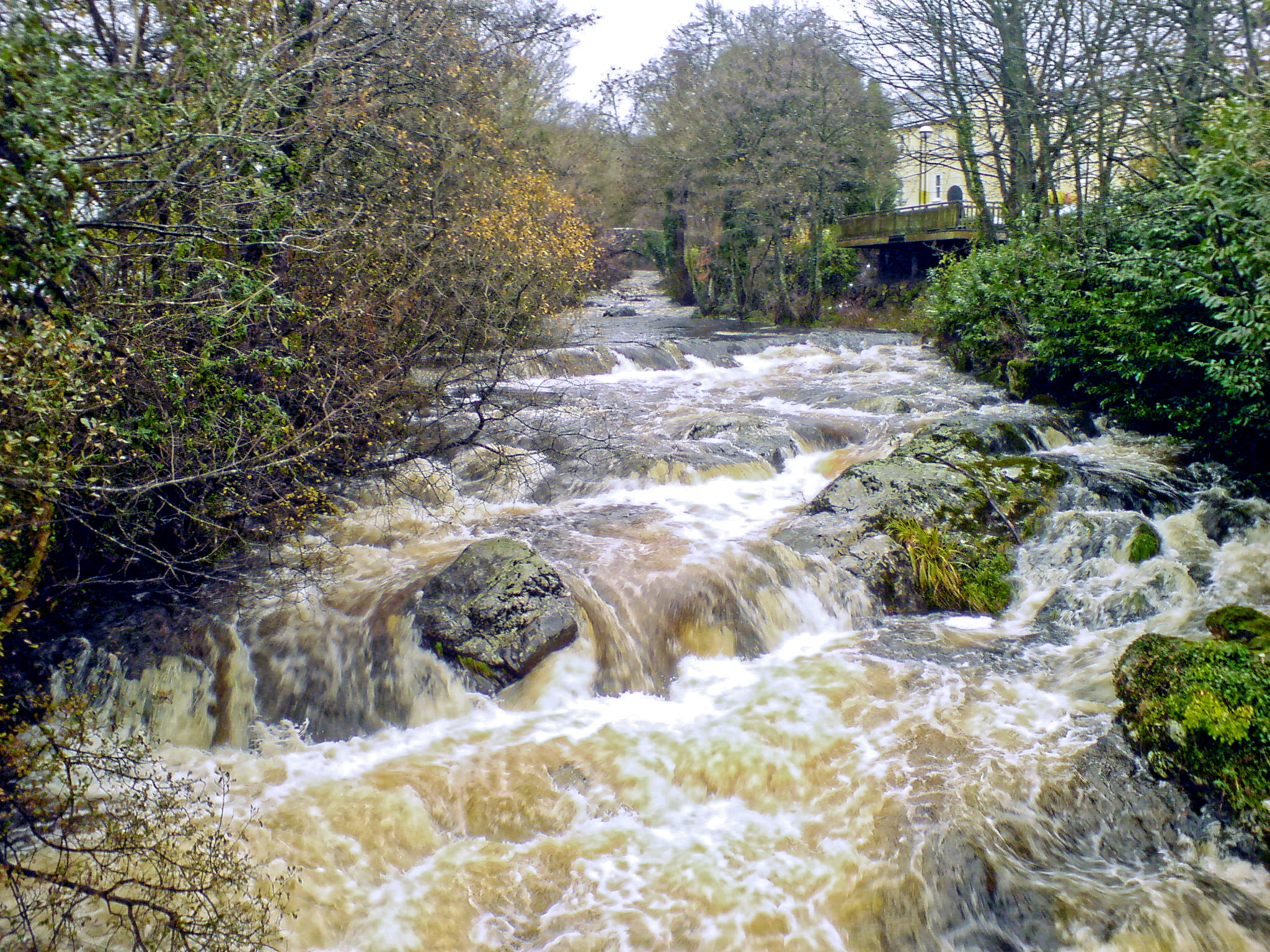
River Erme at Ivybridge

The built environment in and around Ivybridge is mainly characterised by its suburban streets plans and houses, although in the centre of Ivybridge it's mainly characterised by Victorian buildings. From the centre of the town most buildings are terraced and now many of these buildings have been converted into retail outlets along Fore Street – the town's central business district. In the middle layer of the town most buildings are semi-detached and built on quite steep roads. More detached houses are found on the outer layers of the city on the east and on the west of the town. Over the past decades the town has been shaped by its two most essential pieces of infrastructure: the railway line to the north and the A38 dual carriageway to the south. No large scaling housing has been built on either side of these boundaries. Due to this Ivybridge has been forced to grow east and west rather than north and south; it stretches approximately 1.76 miles (2.83 km) from east to west and 1 mile (1.6 km) from north to south.

=== Climate ===
Ivybridge

Climate chart (precipitation, max. and min. temperature)
J	F	M	A	M	J	J	A	S	O	N	D
114 9 3	92 8 3	87 10 4	59 12 6	61 15 8	57 18 11	55 20 13	69 19 13	76 18 11	95 15 9	101 11 6	116 10 4
- █ Average max. and min. temperatures in °C
- █ Precipitation totals in mm
Imperial conversion
J	F	M	A	M	J	J	A	S	O	N	D
4.5 47 38	3.6 47 38	3.4 50 39	2.3 54 42	2.4 59 47	2.2 64 52	2.2 67 55	2.7 67 55	3 64 52	3.7 58 49	4 52 42	4.6 49 40
- █ Average max. and min. temperatures in °F
- █ Precipitation totals in inches

Along with the rest of South West England, Ivybridge has a temperate climate which is generally wetter and milder than the rest of the British Isles. The annual mean temperature is approximately 11 °C (52 °F) and shows a seasonal and a diurnal variation, but due to the modifying effect of the sea the range is less than in most other parts of the British Isles. February is the coldest month with mean minimum temperatures between 3 °C (37 °F) and 4 °C (39 °F). July and August are the warmest months with mean daily maxima over 19 °C (66 °F).

The climate of South West England has a favoured location with respect to the Azores high pressure when it extends its influence north-eastwards towards the British Isles, particularly in summer. Coastal areas have average annual sunshine totals over 1,600 hours.

Rainfall tends to be associated with Atlantic depressions or with convection. The Atlantic depressions are more vigorous in autumn and winter and most of the rain which falls in those seasons in the south-west is from this source. Average annual rainfall is around 980 millimetres (39 in). The number of days with snow falling is typically less than ten per winter. November to March have the highest mean wind speeds, with June to August having the lightest winds. The predominant wind direction is from the south-west and, as a result, the air quality in Ivybridge may be reduced by the (proposed) construction of an incinerator southwest of the town (at the New England Quarry) with possible implications for health.

== Demography ==
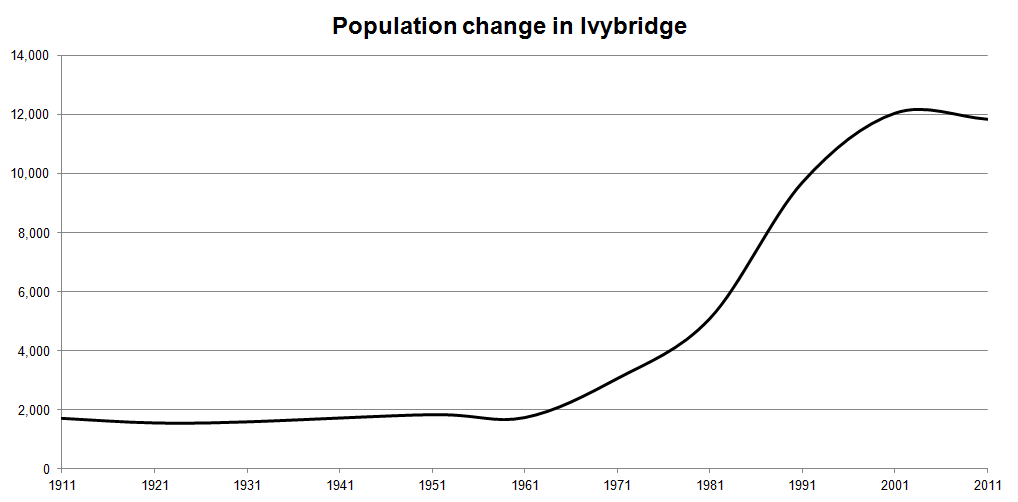
Population change in Ivybridge since 1911

Ivybridge's most recent census indicates that Ivybridge had a population of 11,851. The United Kingdom Census 2011 was carried out by the Office for National Statistics in England and Wales, on Sunday, 27 March 2011. To put that figure into comparison with the area surrounding Ivybridge: it accounts for about 14% of the South Hams' total population (83,140) and it accounts for about 1% of Devon's total population (1,133,800). The town has a median age of 42 (up from 36 since 2001), which is above the national average of 39.

The ethnicity of Ivybridge is predominately white with 98.7% of the population identifying themselves as such. This is slightly higher than the local average of the South Hams (98.3%) and much higher than the national average for England (85.5%). Of the remaining ethnic groups, 0.7% are mixed, 0.5% are Asian, 0.1% are Black and 0.1% are classed as other.

== Economy ==
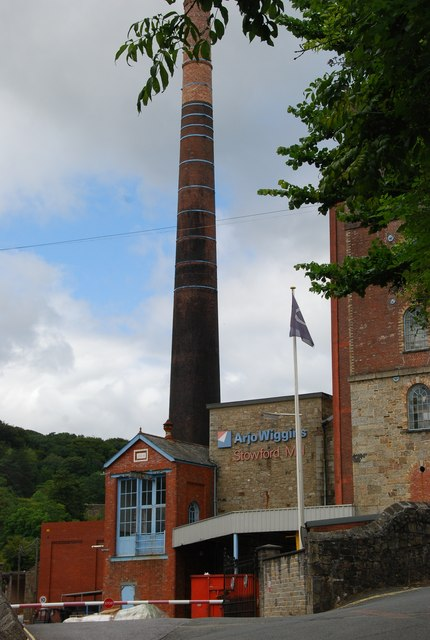
Paper Mill

Ivybridge's earliest known economy relied on the River Erme with a corn mill, tin mill and an edge mill in existence in the town. Later development of the town relied on both the River Erme and the railway, which was built in the latter part of the Industrial Revolution of the United Kingdom. The largest employer to the town from 1787 Stowford Paper Mill, which led to population growth in the town. The paper mill closed in 2013. With the expansion of the town in the late 20th century much of the new jobs are in the service sector of industry. Due to the A38 Ivybridge's transport to nearby city Plymouth was made possible as a commuter route. As a result, a lot of Ivybridge's work or "economy" is made in Plymouth and nearby towns. Ivybridge does still have some of its own industry with a small industrial estate at the south of the town and very nearby an industrial estate just to the west at Lee Mill. There have been attempts to brand the town as a walking centre for southern Dartmoor. There is good access to Dartmoor from the town. For example, one route follows the route of the old china clay railway to Redlake in the heart of the moor, another follows the Erme through Longtimber Woods. There are other accesses to the Moor. The Two Moors Way, which crosses Dartmoor and Exmoor starts in Ivybridge and finishes in Lynmouth on the North Devon coast.

The shopping area is mainly along Fore Street and Glanvilles Mill and provides many jobs and services for the town, although the local schools combine to be the biggest employers. There are some out of town jobs at the Tesco Extra superstore at Lee Mill and Endsleigh Garden & Leisure (Wyevale). The town has six traditional public houses: The Sportsmans, the Trehill Arms, the Exchange, the Old Smithy, the Duke of Cornwall and the Imperial. As well as a local brewery; Ivybridge Brewing Co an independent brewery and tap room that works with people with a diverse range of disabilities.

== Landmarks ==
The town's natural landmark is Western Beacon; a hill that overlooks the town. People walk up there for the views of Ivybridge and the South Hams. The town's first manmade landmark is the Ivy Bridge; a 13th-century hump-backed bridge covered in Ivy. It is still in use today and gives the name of the town – Ivybridge. The two remaining industrial landmarks of the town are the viaduct over the River Erme and the paper mill. The original viaduct was built by Isambard Kingdom Brunel in 1848, only the granite piers remain. The operational line alongside was built by Sir James Charles Inglis opened in 1894 for the Great Western Railway. It still carries the mainline trains. They were key to the town's initial growth in the Industrial Revolution and are still importance to the town today. In the centre of the town a war memorial, equidistant from three of the churches, was unveiled in 1922 and each year on Remembrance Day the town holds a ceremony to those who lost their lives. In recent years another memorial has also been built nearby commemorating the lives of American servicemen stationed in and near the town in 1943–1944, many of whom died on Omaha Beach on D-Day. The Watermark is one of the town's modern landmarks, which began construction in 2007 and was completed in March 2008 at a cost of £1.4 million. It functions as a library, entertainment venue, cinema and offers office space.

== Transport ==
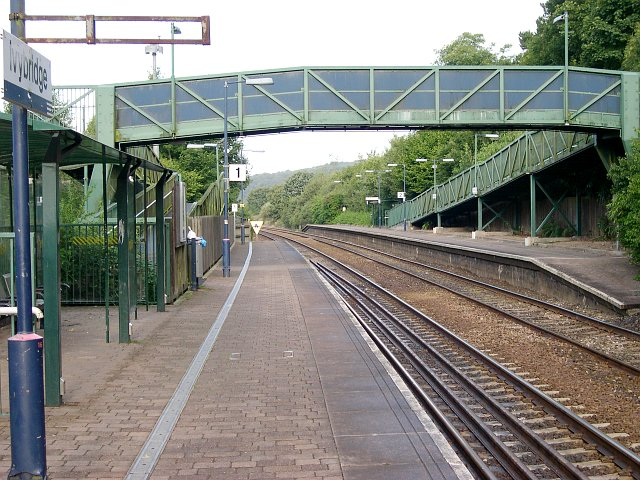
Facing west towards Plymouth at Ivybridge railway station

Ivybridge has long been a staging post on the Exeter to Plymouth road dating back to the 13th century and the "Ivy Bridge" was the only way over the River Erme at the time. The bridge itself is still in use to this day taking cars (one-way) and pedestrians across the river. In the 1830s a new bridge was built at the top of Fore Street (approximately 130 yards down the river). It is now used as a 1-way road across the river for vehicles and a separate pedestrian bridge lies alongside it. Another bridge (Marjorie Kelly Way/B3213, built in the 1990s) is situated at the bottom of Fore Street. In 1974 the A38 road was opened linking Ivybridge to Plymouth and Exeter. It was the first major trunk road for Ivybridge and was bypassed at the B3213, which runs through the centre of Ivybridge and connects it to the nearby villages of Bittaford and Wrangaton.

The first railway station at Ivybridge was not complete when the South Devon Railway was opened, but was brought into use six weeks later on 15 June 1848. The building was situated on the north side of the track, immediately to the west of Ivybridge Viaduct. Passenger trains were withdrawn in 1959 and the goods facility closed in 1965. On 15 July 1994 a new station was opened on a new site costing £380,000, outside the town, to the east. It is operated by Great Western Railway who run links to London Paddington via Exeter and also south west to Cornwall. The station is advertised as a Park and Ride for the nearby city of Plymouth, although the level of service is infrequent and sporadic.

The town has a bus service 80 to Plymouth, Totnes, Paignton and Torquay operated by Stagecoach South West. It operates a half hourly route with Ivybridge as a primary stop. The 38 bus to Exeter and Plymouth is every 2 hours, and is also operated by Stagecoach South West. Plymouth Citybus operate the 20/20A service to Plymouth, via Lee Mill and Plympton. This is a popular bus with shoppers, as it calls at the Tesco Superstore in Lee Mill.

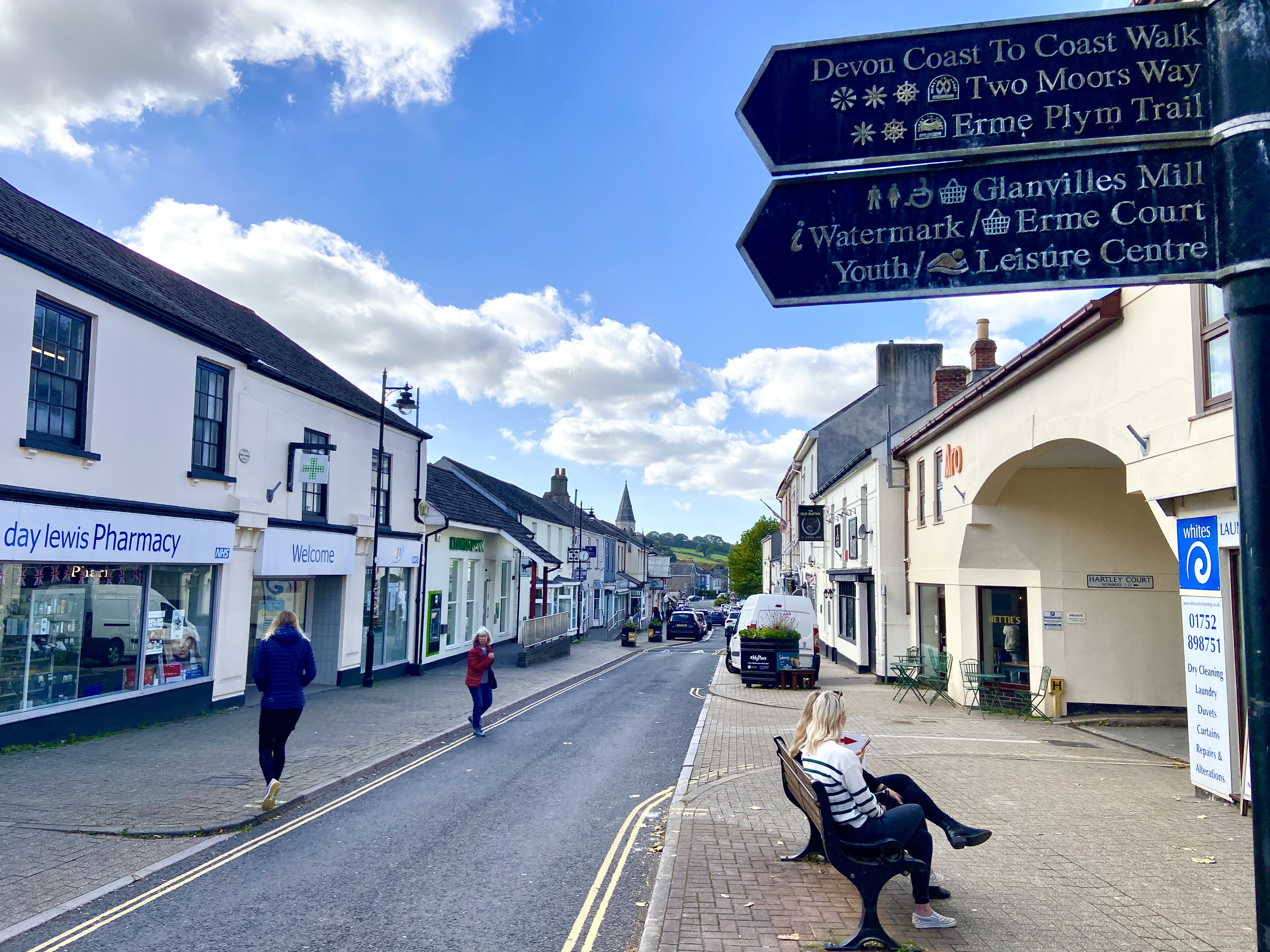

== Shopping ==
The shopping area is mainly along Fore Street, with some small shops and restaurants situated in the Glanvilles Mill shopping centre which is accessible from Fore Street and the car park.

== Education ==
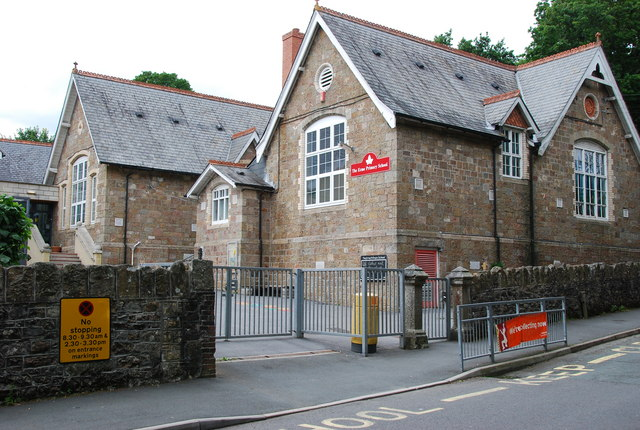
Erme Primary School – the town's first school

The town has six schools: four state primary schools, the Dame Hannah Roger's special school, and Ivybridge Community College, the town's secondary state school, which has a sixth form. It has specialist status as a sports college and has recently been given awards in science and mathematics as well as languages. The school has a very large catchment area which stretches from Shaugh Prior on Dartmoor, to Bigbury on the coast and covers many of the villages in the South Hams such as Ugborough, Modbury and Yealmpton. There are no independent schools in Ivybridge, but Dame Hannah Rogers School provides a boarding education for children with disabilities and communication needs. The nearest university is the University of Plymouth. In 2008 a new library and resource centre called the Watermark was opened, replacing the small library on Keaton Road. Notable people from the community college include sports teacher Michaela Breeze who won a gold medal weightlifting in the 2002 Commonwealth Games for Wales and won another gold medal in the 2006 Commonwealth Games, Chris Bell, a retired rugby union player with Leeds, Harlequins, Sale Sharks and Wasps, and the school's former principal – Geoffrey Rees now retired, who was given a CBE for his services to education.

== Religion ==
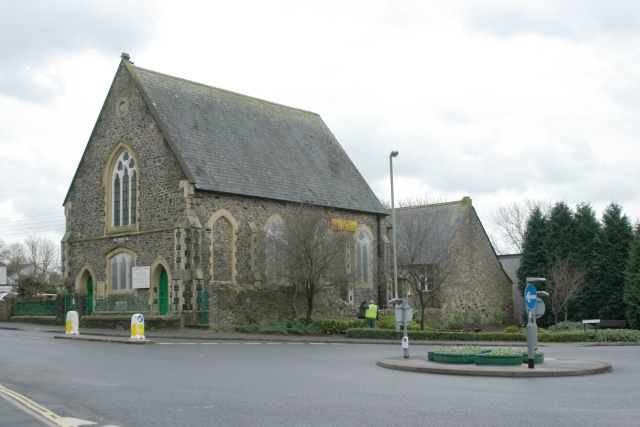
Ivybridge Evangelical Church

Ivybridge has five churches. St John's Church (Anglican) is the parish church situated in Blachford Road. There is also an Evangelical Baptist church and a Methodist church. On the western outskirts of the town is a Roman Catholic church – St Austin's Priory. The Salvation Army Church hold meetings in Fore Street.

In 2011, 65.1% of the population stated that they were Christian, 26.5% stated as no religion and 7.8% did not state their religion. Furthermore, there were a few people stating other religions: 0.3 (31 people) as other religions, 0.2% (18 people) stated as Buddhist, 0.1 (16 people) as Muslim, 0.1% (7 people) as Hindu, and one Jew. Since 2001, there has been a shift from Christian (down 13 percentage points) to non-religious (up 12 points).

== Sport ==
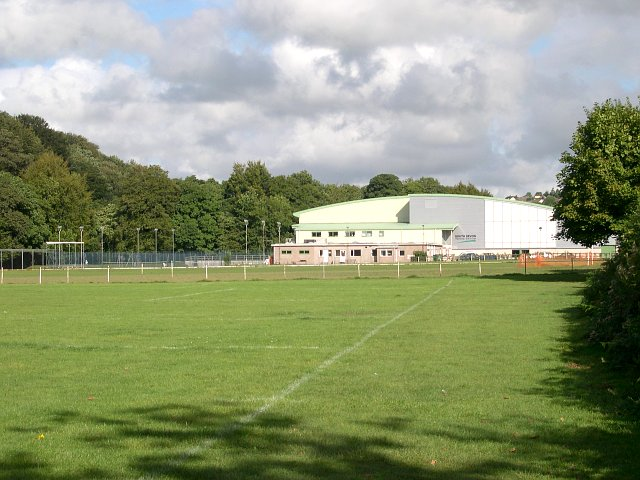
Ivybridge playing fields

The town hosts the following sports teams and clubs:

- Ivybridge Town F.C. was founded in 1925 and play at region level in the South West Peninsula League
- Manstow FC play on the football pitches located in Filham Park
- The town's flat green bowls club is situated at the end of Bridge Park
- Rugby pitches on the eastern outskirts of town at Ivybridge Rugby Football Club
- Filham Park has a cricket club, football pitches and a fishing lake.

There are several leisure facilities in the town:

- South Dartmoor Leisure Centre features an indoor swimming pool, an outdoor swimming pool, an indoor sports hall, squash courts and gymnasium facilities
- South Devon Tennis Centre has four indoor and four outdoor courts
- Erme playing fields (Erme Valley) which hold a cricket field (with a practice net), two football pitches and the Erme Valley Harriers (athletics and road running)
- There is also a skatepark in the centre of the town.

== Media ==
Local news and television programmes are provided by BBC South West and ITV West Country. Television signals are received from the Caradon Hill TV transmitter and the local relay transmitter.

Local radio stations are BBC Radio Devon, Radio Exe Devon, Heart West, Greatest Hits Radio South West, and TorDab, a community based station which broadcast from Torquay.

The town is served by the local newspaper, Ivybridge & South Brent Gazette which publishes on Fridays.

== Public services ==
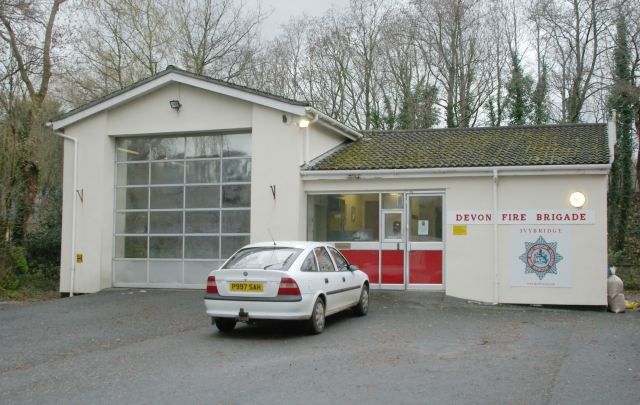
Ivybridge Fire Station

South West Water supplies the town with water and sewage services. South Hams District Council is responsible for waste management. The town's Distribution Network Operator is Western Power Distribution. Currently the town along with the rest of Devon relies on electricity generated further north from the national grid, although Langage Power Station in Plympton is now generating. The town has two health centres: Ivybridge Health Centre and Highlands Health Centre, both located near the centre of the town. It also has four dentist surgeries: Victoria House Dental Surgery, Fore Street Dental Practice, Browns Dental Practice and Highland Dental Practice. Ivybridge is served by Plymouth Hospitals NHS Trust and the nearest hospital is Derriford Hospital in Plymouth. South Western Ambulance Service NHS Trust operates in Ivybridge and the rest of the south west; its headquarters are in Exeter. Devon and Cornwall Constabulary serve the town's policing matters and there is a small police station in the centre of the town. Ivybridge has one retained fire station (number 53) on the southern outskirts of town, which is in the west division of Devon as part of Devon and Somerset Fire and Rescue Service. It has a water tender ladder, prime mover, environmental pod and an incident support unit. The fire station used to be closer to the centre of the town.

== Notable residents ==
- Edmund Hartley (1847–1919), awarded the Victoria Cross in the Basuto Gun War. Hartley Court in Fore Street is named after him.
- Gordon McLeod (1890–1963), actor, remembered for his recurring appearance as Claud Eustace Teal in The Saint
- Hugh Morton (1903–1984), actor, mainly on BBC Radio, but also in theatre, cinema and on TV.

=== Sport ===
most attended Ivybridge Community College

- Stuart Hooper (born 1981), rugby union player who played 177 games for Bath Rugby and then became their director
- Chris Bell (born 1983), rugby union footballer, played 49 games for Harlequins and 94 for Sale Sharks
- Luke Summerfield (born 1987), footballer who played over 500 games beginning with 79 for Plymouth Argyle
- Ben Moon (born 1989), former rugby union player, played 302 games with Exeter Chiefs
- Ryan Leonard (born 1992), footballer who has played over 475 games, including 228 for Southend United
- Ben Spencer (born 1992), rugby union player, who has played 116 games for Bath Rugby and 16 for England
- Luke Young (born 1993), footballer who has played over 500 games, beginning with 99 for Plymouth Argyle
- Sam Hill (born 1993), rugby union player who played 147 games for Exeter Chiefs
- Sam Simmonds (born 1994), rugby union player, who has played over 210 games, beginning with 131 for Exeter Chiefs
- Stu Townsend (born 1995), rugby union player who has played over 170 games, beginning with 121 for Exeter Chiefs
- Joe Simmonds (born 1996), rugby union player, who has played over 260 games, beginning with 170 for Exeter Chiefs

== In art and literature ==
An engraving of a painting of the river by Thomas Allom, together with a poetical illustration by Letitia Elizabeth Landon set to music by Henry Russell, were published in Fisher's Drawing Room Scrap Book, 1835.

== See also ==
- List of civil parishes in Devon
- List of schools in the South West of England
- United Kingdom Census 2001
