= Letterboxing (hobby) =

Outdoor hobby

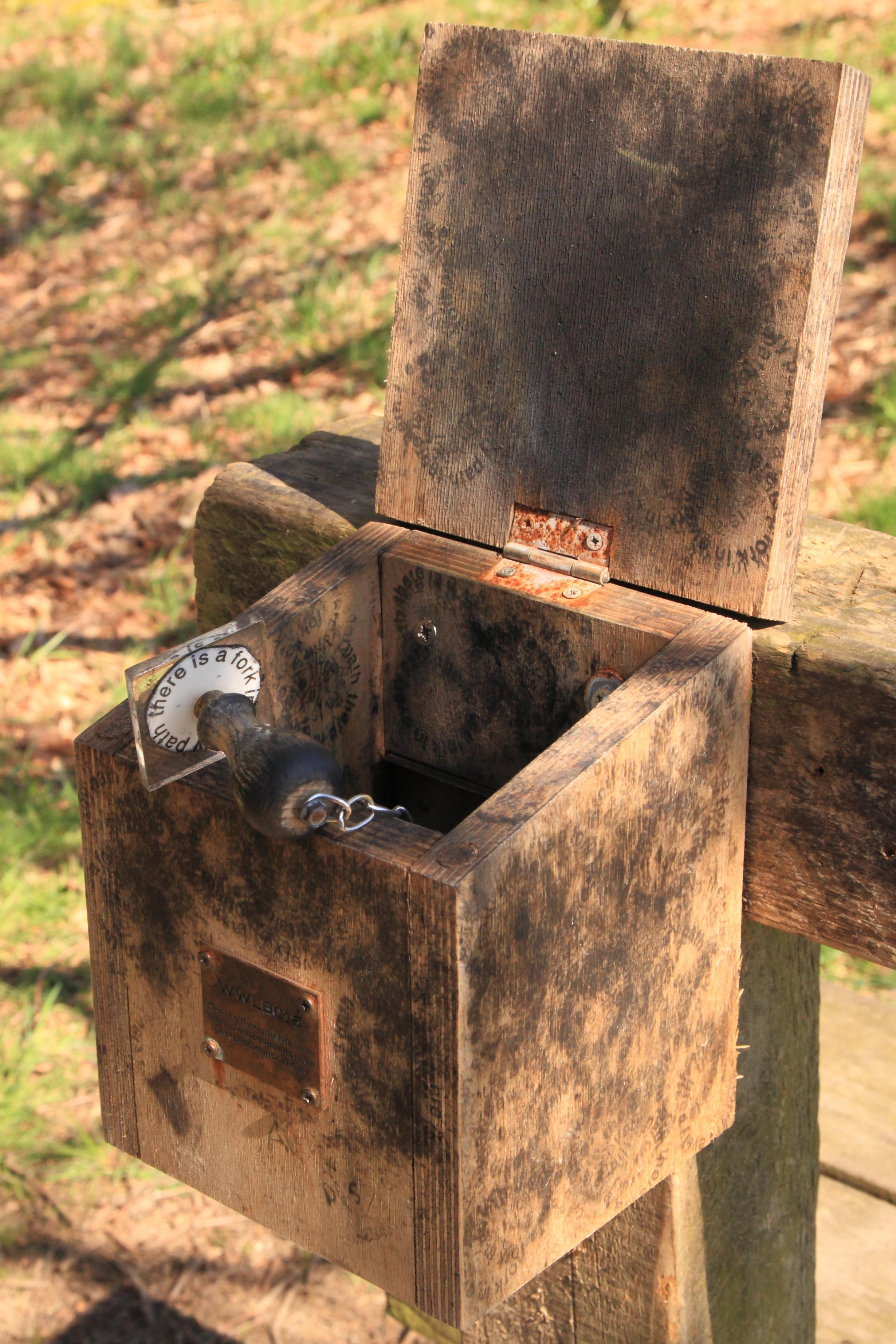
A letterbox by Alec Finlay, with a rubber stamp poem: "There is a fork in every path".

Letterboxing is an outdoor hobby that combines elements of orienteering, art, and puzzle solving. Letterboxers hide small, weatherproof boxes in publicly accessible places (like parks) and distribute clues to finding the box in printed catalogs, on one of several websites, or by word of mouth. Individual letterboxes contain a notebook and a rubber stamp, preferably hand carved or custom made. Finders make an imprint of the letterbox's stamp in their personal notebook, and leave an impression of their personal signature stamp on the letterbox's "visitors' book" or "logbook" — as proof of having found the box and letting other letterboxers know who has visited. Many letterboxers keep careful track of their "find count".

== History ==
The origin of letterboxing can be traced to Dartmoor, Devon, England in 1854. William Crossing in his Guide to Dartmoor states that a well known Dartmoor guide (James Perrott) placed a bottle for visiting cards at Cranmere Pool on the northern moor in 1854. From this hikers on the moors began to leave a letter or postcard inside a box along the trail (sometimes addressed to themselves, sometimes a friend or relative)—hence the name "letterboxing". The next person to discover the site would collect the postcards and post them. In 1938 a plaque and letterbox in Crossing's memory were placed at Duck's Pool on southern Dartmoor.

The first Dartmoor letterboxes were so remote and well-hidden that only the most determined walkers found them, allowing weeks to pass before the letter made its way home. Until the 1970s there were no more than a dozen sites around the moor, usually in the most inaccessible locations. Increasingly, however, letterboxes have been located in relatively accessible sites and today there are thousands of letterboxes, many within easy walking distance of the road. As a result, the tradition of leaving a letter or postcard in the box has been forgotten.

Membership of the "100 Club" is open to anyone who has found at least 100 letterboxes on Dartmoor. Clues to the locations of letterboxes are published by the "100 Club" in an annual catalogue. Some letterboxes however remain "word of mouth" and the clues to their location can only be obtained from the person who placed the box. Some clues may also be found in other letterboxes or on the Internet. However, this is more common for letterboxes in places other than Dartmoor, where no "100 Club" or catalogue exists.

Letterboxing has become a popular hobby, with thousands of walkers gathering for 'box-hunts', and while in some areas of Dartmoor it is particularly popular amongst children, some of the more difficult to find boxes and tougher terrain are better suited to more experienced adults.

Letterboxes can be found in other areas of the United Kingdom, including the North York Moors, and have spread all over the world. The Scottish artist Alec Finlay has placed letterboxes with rubber stamp circle poems at locations around the world, including Yorkshire Sculpture Park.

Interest in letterboxing in the US is generally considered to have started with a feature article in the Smithsonian magazine in April 1998. Much of the terminology below is associated with letterboxing in the US and would be unfamiliar to UK letterboxers. The growing popularity of the somewhat similar activity of geocaching during the 2000s has increased interest in letterboxing as well.

== Gatherings ==
Letterboxers organise events, usually called meets or gatherings. The first letterbox meet was held on Dartmoor, and they are now held twice-yearly on "clock change days" (in March and October). Gatherings in the US are usually at parks or places with enough space for a large group of letterboxers to meet up and do exchanges (exchanging of personal stamps and/or personal travelers), as well as talk and discuss box ideas. Gatherings in the US usually have a special, one-day "Event stamp." At some gatherings, boxes are created or donated to be planted nearby specifically for the gathering attendees to find.

The first gathering in North America was held in November, 1999, at The Inn at Long Trail in Killington, Vermont.

== Types ==
There are now many different kinds of letterboxes, each with some specific distinction. While purists recognise only those letterboxes planted in the wild, many new variations exist. The kinds include:

Traditional box
A normal letterbox, hidden and uses clue to find it.

Mystery box
These are usually traditional boxes, but these "mystery" boxes have either vague starting areas, no starting areas, no descriptions, no clue – any number of things to make the box extremely hard to find.

Bonus box
The clues for these are usually found in a traditional box as an extra one to find. Usually planted in the same area as the traditional that hosts its clue. Clues can be distributed in any way.

Word of mouth box (WOM)
The clue is given by word of mouth, or typed up, but a letterboxer can only receive the clue from the planter.

Cuckoo clue
A clue without a home. The clue is hidden in another letterbox (similar to clues for a bonus boxes), but the letterboxer that finds the clue is expected to move the clue to another nearby letterbox. The cuckoo clue typically contains directions to limit how far the clue should travel to find a new home.

Hitchhiker
A traveling letterbox, it is placed in a traditional letterbox for another letterboxer to find. When found, it is stamped like a traditional letterbox, but is then carried by the letterboxer to the next letterbox they find and then left in that letterbox for the next finder. The hitchhiker's stamp should also be recorded in the host letterbox's logbook, and vice versa.

Personal traveller
Much like a traditional box, but instead of being planted, the box is kept with the creator at all times. If another letterboxer is met on the trail or at a meet it is attainable if requested. In the US this box is usually only attainable if the other letterboxer knows the password or passphrase which is sometimes cryptic, straightforward, almost non-existent, or silly.

In the US, letterboxes have developed new forms:

Cootie
Much like a hitchhiker, except instead of being carried from letterbox to letterbox, a letterboxer passes it to another letterboxer. It can be passed in a personal traveller, or planted on another letterboxer or their unattended bags on the trails or at gatherings. Most people are subtle about planting them—but not all.

Flea
Like a combination of a hitchhiker and a cootie. Either put in a traditional letterbox, like a hitchhiker, or put it on a person, like a cootie.

Hitchhiker hostel
This is a traditional letterbox with special qualities. Namely, it is a "hostel" for hitchhikers, sized and specially designated to hold multiple hitchhikers at one time. Normally, there are at least one or two hitchhikers in the box at all times, and any letterboxer who takes a hitchhiker out is required to leave a new one in its place. A hitchhiker hostel has its own stamp and logbook, just like a traditional letterbox, and any hitchhiker that is placed within it should be stamped and recorded within the logbook, preferably with both the date of its being added to the hostel (in order to make it easier to move the older hitchhikers out), and the date it is removed.

American parasite (these should not be confused with English parasites)
A parasite is very much like a hitchhiker except, instead of being carried by a letterboxer between letterboxes on its own, it is carried along with a hitchhiker. When a letterboxer joins a parasite to a hitchhiker ("infecting" it), it is stamped into the hitchhiker. The parasite's stamp is also recorded in the logbook of the letterbox that a hitchhiker is placed in, "infecting" the letterbox, as well. In the event of being placed in a letterbox that has multiple hitchhikers in it (such as a hitchhiker hostel), the parasite "infects" all of the hitchhikers inside. The letterboxer that has done the moving also has the choice of sending the parasite along with a different hitchhiker. (This is a relatively new variation of letterbox, and has only just recently begun to take off.)

Virtual
Online letterboxes; A scavenger hunt of sorts for an image of a letterbox through different websites, collecting answers to questions posted as the clues to the box. Answers sometimes are unscrambled or emailed to the creator; the final answer is put in a blank in a web address, which takes the finder to an image of the letterbox online.

Limited time box
A letterbox that has only been planted for a short amount of time. (A few days or a week, any time length the planter wants.)

Postal (PLB)
Boxes that are made like traditional letterboxes, but instead of being planted in the wild, they are sent via postal mail to the people on sign-up lists for the box, or around a "ring" of people in a postal ring, which is usually focused on a theme of some sort. Postals are also very often very well-designed and organised, as well as ornate.

Circle poem
A circle poem is a kind of 'art' letterbox developed in Britain. There are one hundred planned boxes, each of which contains a rubber stamp circle poem by the Scottish poet and artist, Alec Finlay. These are sited at locations around the world, and each has its own nominated keeper.

== Find counts ==
A letterboxer's find count or PFX count is organised as follows:

- The P ("plants") count is the number of boxes the letterboxer has made and placed.
- The F ("finds") count is the number of boxes the letterboxer has found in the wild.
- The X ("exchanges") count is the number of exchanges the letterboxer has.

Some boxers list individual types of boxes in their PFX counts (e.g.: P12 F76 X45 E4 HH21 V4 would mean 12 plants, 76 finds, 45 exchanges, four events or event stamps, 21 hitchhikers, and four virtuals). Some include virtuals, hitchhikers, and other non-traditional boxes in a single find count, while some exclude them. Many letterboxers do not bother to keep count at all.

The "PFX count" is not a term associated with Dartmoor Letterboxing.

== Questing ==
Questing is a game played across a community or geographic place. Originally coined in the US, it is similar to the concept of letterboxing where clues lead to sealed boxes to be found in a type of treasure hunt.

Vital Communities, a non-profit organization in White River Junction, Vermont, established the Valley Quest program as a sense-of-place education program in 1995. Valley quests map and share the Upper Valley region's special places. Created by school groups, scout groups, historical societies and others, there are now over 200 quests across Vermont and New Hampshire. Questing has spread to other communities, too. There is a South Shore Quests program in Hingham, Massachusetts along with programs in Keene, New Hampshire and on Martha's Vineyard.

== See also ==
- BookCrossing – Book exchange website
- Encounter – International network of active urban games
- Geocaching – Outdoor recreational activity
- Orienteering – Sport using maps and compasses
- Puzzlehunt – Type of puzzle game
