= Ivybridge Community College =

Location
- Harford Road; Ivybridge, Devon, PL21 OJA; England; 50°23′34″N 3°55′06″W

Information
- Type: Academy
- Motto: "Be proud of what we achieve"
- Established: 1958
- Department for Education URN: 136336 Tables
- Ofsted: Reports
- Chair of Governors: Michael Saltern
- Principal: Rachel Hutchinson
- Staff: 350
- Gender: Mixed
- Age: 11 to 18
- Enrolment: 2400
- Colours: Navy blue & grey
- Publication: The College Echo
- Website: www.ivybridge.devon.sch.uk

Ivybridge Community College is a state-funded secondary school and academy in Ivybridge, Devon, England. Located on the southern slopes of Dartmoor, it takes students from the surrounding 100 square miles (260 km^{2}) of the South Hams, from 14 contributory primary schools.

It is the second-largest secondary school in Devon and among the ten largest secondary schools in England, with over 2,400 pupils, few of whom are from ethnic minorities and 14% of whom are registered special educational needs pupils. It has many departments and caters for special needs and disabled pupils, with sensory rooms and lifts for the pupils in wheelchairs. The SEND department team has four members who are assigned to disabled pupils. They have a range of different subjects and a Learning Resource Centre with computers and books. There are also a large range of clubs including gymnastics and football.

== History ==
It was awarded a sports specialism in 1997, a specialism in science in 2004 and a third specialism in languages in 2005.

In December 2009, Geoffrey Rees CBE retired as Principal of Ivybridge Community College after holding the position for 22 years. The next principal, Rob Haring, moved from Hanley Castle High School, a specialist language college in Worcestershire, to assume office at the start of 2010. The school introduced blazers to the uniform and new PE kits at the start of the 2010/11 academic year. In June 2010, it was announced that it had applied to become an academy, independent from Devon County Council's control and funded directly from central government. This took effect in November 2010. New PE kit was introduced in 2016/17.

Former Team GB gymnast, Rachel Hutchinson, moved from St Peter's School in Exeter to become Principal from September 2016 and is still holding her position in 2025.

== Academics ==
The only secondary school in Ivybridge, Ivybridge Community College offers a range of student facilities and is usually over-subscribed. The college received an outstanding report from Ofsted in 2006, 2011 and 2013.

== Curriculum ==
The college curriculum follows the national curriculum of England and Wales and offers French and Spanish for a compulsory modern foreign language. Year 7-9 students in upper classes study a second language as well. Students choose 4 GCSE subjects, alongside Maths, English, Science, General Studies and, which are compulsory. (Note that General Studies is not a GCSE but is taught for PSHE purposes. Science is taught for seven hours a fortnight similarly for maths and English (KS3). For KS4, students have 8 hours of English, 8 hours of maths and either 9 or 14 hours of science per fortnight ( depending on gcse science choice). Higher standard science students do Science and Additional Science and lower standard science students study the more vocational Science and Applied Science. The school has a sixth form for students to take AS and A levels and BTEC National Diplomas. The start of the school year in 2009 was the first year where some sixth formers studied International Baccalaureate diplomas alongside those choosing to do A levels. This follows the move to the IB by many Plymouth, Exeter and other Devon schools.

== Results ==
In 2006, 84% of English students, 86% of maths students and 86% of science students achieved NC level 5 and above at the end of Key Stage 3. All results had improved since 2005 in particular English which rose by from 78%. In 2007, 22% of year 9 students achieved a level 7 in Physical Education, compared to the 6% of pupils in 2006. In the 2006 SATs the percentage of students at level 7 was just 8%, compared to the national average of 9%.

At Key Stage 4, students take GCSEs and BTEC National Diplomas. In the period 2002–05, the average percentage of students achieving five or more A*–C grades was 78% — 22 points higher than the average for England and Devon (of 56%).

At Sixth form (Key stage 5), tertiary education comprises AS levels/A2 levels taken in years 12 and 13, along with BTEC national diplomas. In 2006, 19% of results were As, 24% were Bs, 30% were Cs, 15% were Ds, 9% were Es and 2% were Us.

== Sport ==
Sports facilities include 4 tennis courts, a former AstroTurf pitch now a 3G rubber crumb, 4 basketball courts, a fitness suite, a rugby pitch, a 200m concrete running track, a gymnasium, a large sports hall, a 100m synthetic long jump track, and a smaller rubber crumb; these are also used for extracurricular clubs. In 2006 the year 8 boys’ football team reached the final of the Under 13 Coca-Cola Cup and the school rugby team participated in the Sanix World Rugby Youth Invitational Tournament. In 2011, the college represented England at the Sanix World Rugby Invitational Tournament.

== Notable staff ==
- Michaela Breeze, former sports teacher (until 2012), won a gold medal weightlifting in the 2002 Commonwealth Games for Wales, was given an MBE at Buckingham Palace for her services to weightlifting in 2011 and won another gold medal in the 2006 Commonwealth Games.
- Geoffrey Rees, principal from 1987 to 2009, was given a CBE at Buckingham Palace for his services to education in 2003.
- Wayne Carlisle, Director of Football since 2011
- Aaron Jarvis (rugby union), former Welsh international rugby player
- Lieutenant Colonel Charles Carfrae (Soldier) , Veteran of the Burma Campaign during World War 2

== Alumni ==
The school and its Rugby Academy have produced a number of professional rugby union players, including:

- Steffon Armitage (born 1985)
- Chris Bell (born 1983)
- Dave Ewers (born 1990)
- Sam Hill (born 1993)
- Stuart Hooper (born 1981)
- Dave Lewis (born 1989)
- Addison Lockley (born 1991)
- Ben Moon (born 1989)
- Joe Simmonds (born 1996)
- Sam Simmonds (born 1994)
- Ben Spencer (born 1992)
- Harry Spencer (born 1988)
- Stuart Townsend (born 1995)
- Ben Vellacott (born 1995)

Other alumni:

- The Days, British pop band
- Cosmo Jarvis (born 1989), musician and actor
- Ryan Leonard, professional footballer
- Danny Sullivan (born 1994), professional footballer
- Luke Young (born 1993), professional footballer
