= Geoffrey Rees =

British educator

Geoffrey Rees CBE FRSA (born 28 February 1946) was the principal of Ivybridge Community College in Devon, England until early 2010. Until 2006, he served as a governor of both Plymouth University and the University College of St Mark & St John, Plymouth. He is non-executive director of the Mountbatten watersports centre in Plymouth. He has been on committees such as The Duke of Edinburgh's Award West Country board. He has been an advisor to the Institute of Directors.

== Career ==
Having studied at the University of Exeter and Emmanuel College, Cambridge, he started his career in 1969 as an assistant history teacher in Richmond upon Thames, and taught in schools in Sussex and Essex before moving to Devon in 1979. He held posts at schools in Plymouth and north Devon before taking up his appointment at Ivybridge in 1987.

Rees oversaw large-scale developments and improvements at Ivybridge Community College. In 2005, ICC was awarded 'Science and Maths College' status, this being the college's second such award after being named a 'Sports College' some years before. The college has gone on to achieve specialist status in Languages. It also is a leading edge institution and a training school. The college has received 'Outstanding' in its last four Ofsted inspections, As of 2009 reports, which has led to it being granted 'High Performing' status. Under his leadership the school has gained International School Status via the British Council.

Having become a fellow of the Royal Society of Arts in 1994, in 2003 he was honoured as Commander of the Order of the British Empire in recognition of his services to education.

He announced, on 5 February 2009, that he would be retiring from his post as principal of Ivybridge Community College at the end of the year, after holding the position for 22 years.

== Personal life ==
Rees is the middle child of Sidney and Mary Rees. He has an older brother Brian (a rugby international), and a younger sister Mandy.

Before teaching, Rees was a rugby union player in his native Wales and went on to Captain the Cambridge University team in a Varsity Match against Oxford University.
