= River Erme =

River in south Devon, England

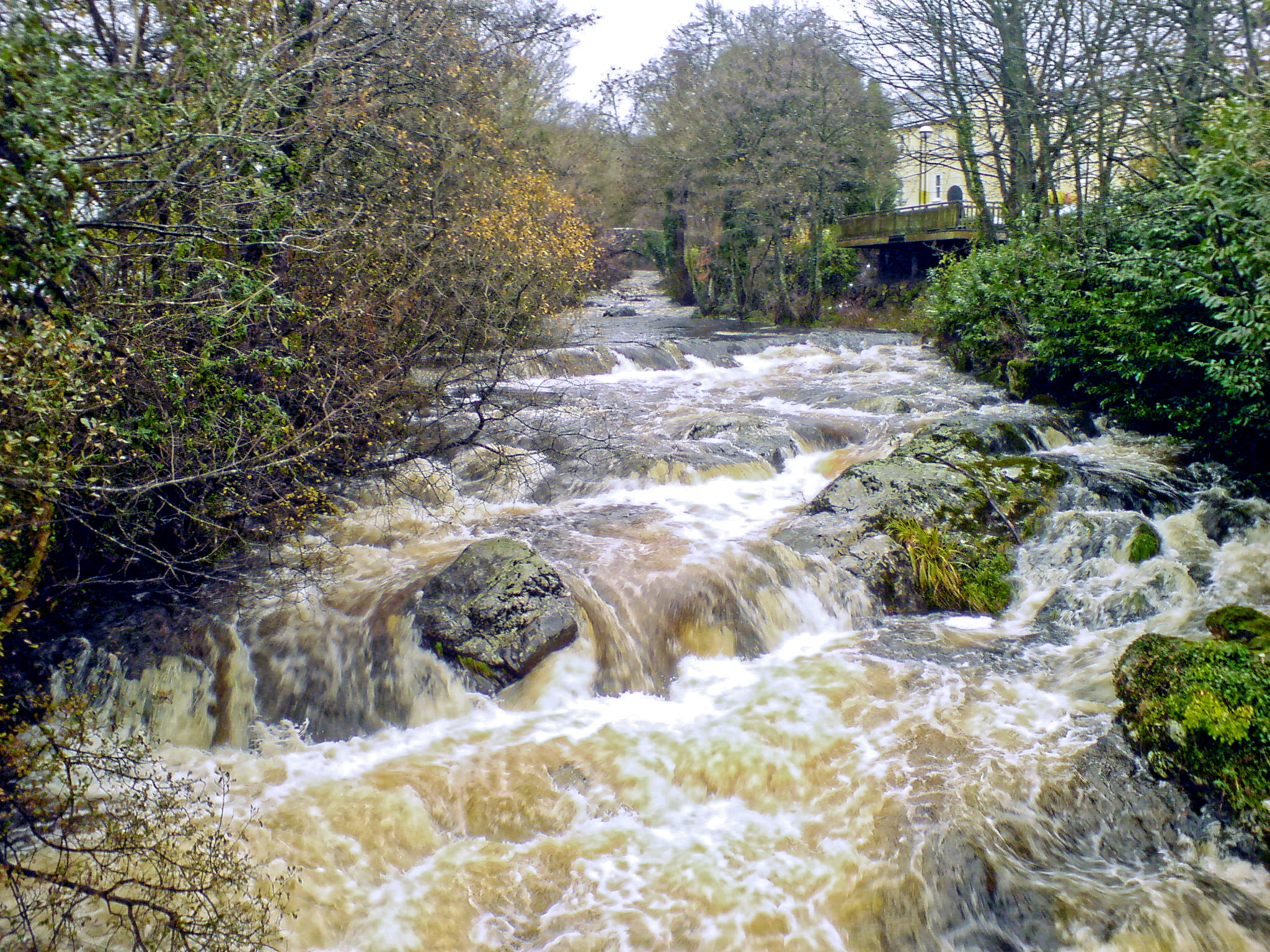
- The Erme flowing through the town of Ivybridge

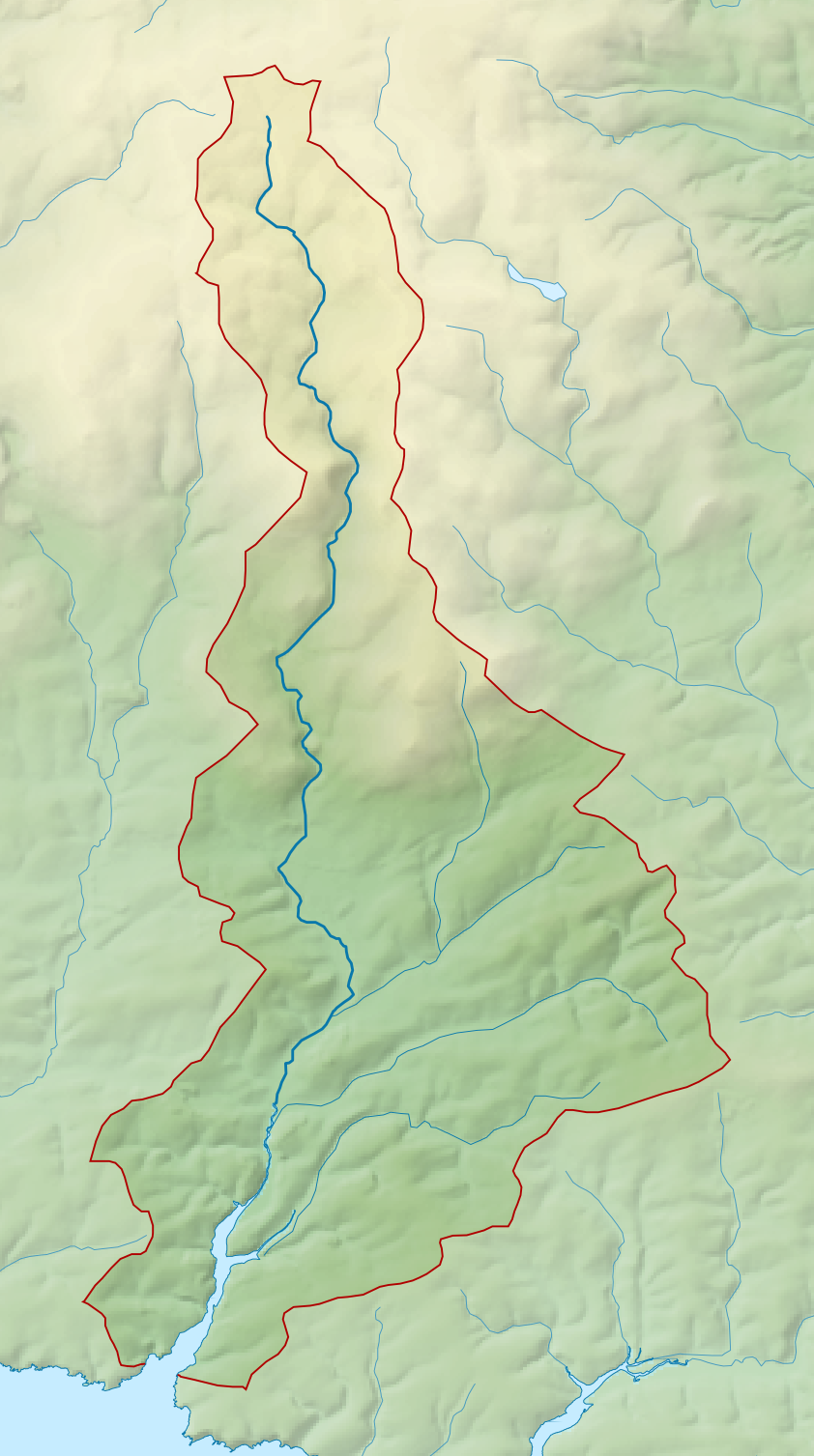
- Map of the course and catchment of the River Erme

- Location within Devon

Location
- Country: England
- Counties: Devon

Physical characteristics
- Source
  - location: Dartmoor
- Mouth: English Channel
  - location: Mothecombe
  - coordinates: 50.3080°N 3.9509°W
- Discharge
  - location: Ermington
  - average: 1.95 m^{3}/s (69 cu ft/s)

The Erme is a river in south Devon, England. From its source on Dartmoor it flows in a generally southerly direction past some of the best-preserved archaeological remains on the moor. It leaves the moor at the town of Ivybridge and continues southward, passing the settlements of Ermington, Modbury and Holbeton. Near Holbeton it becomes a ria and empties into the English Channel in Bigbury Bay, between the rivers Yealm and Avon.

== Toponymy ==
The Ravenna Cosmography, an imperfect list of place-names that was compiled in the early 8th century from late Roman sources, lists amongst many others, over twenty names that probably refer to places in south-west England. Most of these have not been positively identified, but the name Aramis/Aranus/Armis was suggested to be the River Erme by Rivet and Smith in The Place-names of Roman Britain (1979).

The first certain documentary reference to the river is as Irym in the cartulary of Buckfast Abbey, dated 1240. Other early recorded forms are Hyrm, Irm, Erm and, in the mid 16th century, Arme. The derivation of the name remains unknown. Ekwall's suggestion that it is a back-formation from Ermington is now thought to be unlikely. Tristram Risdon, in his 1811 Survey of Devon gives an alternate name for the River Erme as the River Arme. He also refers to the mouth of the River Erme as Armouth. In Donn's map of Devon published in 1765, the village of Mothecombe at the mouth of the river, is referred to as Muddicomb.

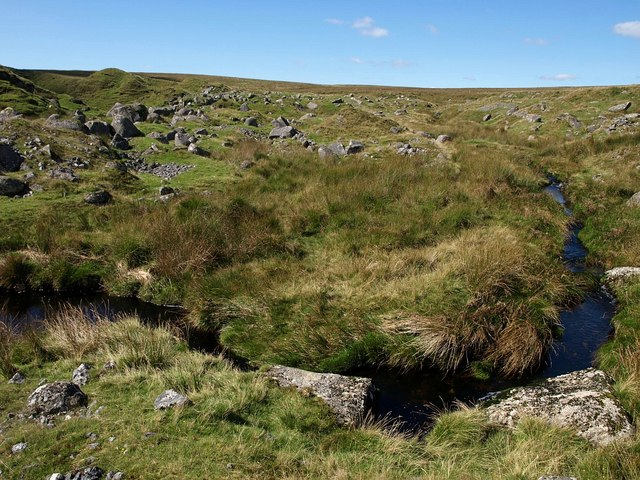
The river just below Erme Pits

== On Dartmoor ==
The River Erme rises near the centre of southern Dartmoor on the Abbot's Way less than a mile to the south of the source of the River Plym. Between these two sources lies Duck's Pool, where there is a plaque and letterbox in memory of the Dartmoor author William Crossing. There are extensive early tin mining workings nearby known as Erme Pits, which are in places over 15 metres deep.

For the first mile or so the river flows south-eastwards. It is joined on the north bank by Wollake, which is the lower part of the Blacklane Brook that rises on the southern flanks of Fox Tor a mile and a half to the north, between Crane Hill and Naker's Hill. The short streams, Dry Lake and Red Lake also join on this side, the latter rising near the disused clay works at Redlake. The confluence of Red Lake, and the source of the Erme are two of the thirty-three places that delineate the ancient boundary of the Forest of Dartmoor. On this stretch, a short stream flowing down Hortonsford Bottom from Langcombe Hill also joins the river from the south.

Between Stingers Hill and Redlake the river turns southward into an area known as The Meadow, where it is crossed by the Upper Erme stone row, the longest on Dartmoor at 3,320 m (10,890 ft). For the next mile or more downstream from here there are extensive archaeological remains on the river's banks, most notably Erme Pound (the highest and largest Bronze Age enclosure in the area), Downing's House (a well-preserved "tinner's cache" or "beehive hut" with much of its roof preserved), and a number of tinner's huts and blowing houses.

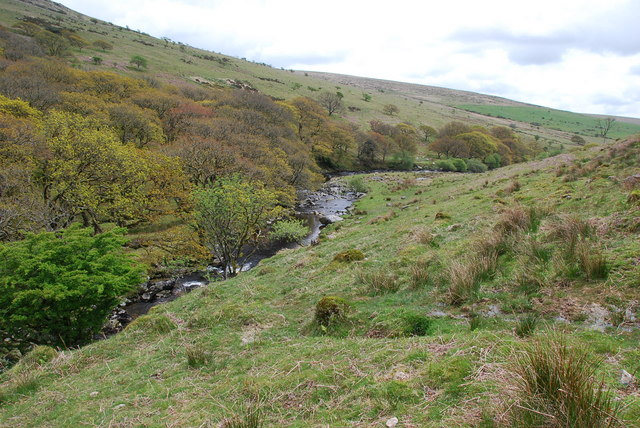
The river leaving its gorge with part of Piles Copse on the left

As the river reaches the edge of the high moor, it flows through the gorge it has cut between Stalldown Barrow on the west and Piles Hill to the east. Here, on the eastern bank, lies Piles Copse which is one of the few areas of ancient woodland on Dartmoor and a Site of Special Scientific Interest.

Although the moorland valley of the Erme today appears to be natural and unspoiled, the entire valley floor from its source down to Piles Copse is artificial, being created by the extensive tin-streaming operations that took place between the 4th and 14th centuries. Supporting evidence for this was provided by a study published in 2004 which showed that phases of aggradation occurred lower down the valley between the 4th century and the 7th century, and in the 13th century.

Leaving the open moor, the river passes into enclosed land and under its first road bridge at the hamlet of Harford. At this point it is joined by the minor stream of Butter Brook, with its now disused reservoir. From Harford down to the boundary of the national park, which here follows the main railway line between Plymouth and Exeter, much of the river's course is in woodland and is a popular site for kayaking and canoeing, especially in Long Timber Woods.

== Ivybridge to Holbeton ==
After leaving the national park, the river continues southward, passing through the centre of the town of Ivybridge where it formed the source of the town's prosperity by powering a grist mill, a paper mill and a fulling and tucking mill. In 1813 the only bridge over the river in the village (as it was then) was the inspiration for J. M. W. Turner's painting The Ivy Bridge.

Immediately south of Ivybridge, the river passes beneath the A38 Devon Expressway – the main road link between Exeter and Plymouth – and then continues to flow southerly through countryside. On its western bank is the village of Ermington with its famous crooked church spire and the Grade I listed Flete House, the river has been measured near the village since 1973, yielding an average flow of 1.95 cubic metres per second (69 cu ft/s). The A379 road between Modbury and Yealmpton crosses the river at Sequer's Bridge, shortly below which the river flows over a weir and becomes tidal.

Surrounding this stretch of the river there are several apple orchards, remnants of the many that were once here. Unlike most of the South Hams where the field boundaries consist of Devon hedge banks, hereabouts the boundaries are walls constructed from rounded river boulders, more like the dry stone walls found on Dartmoor.

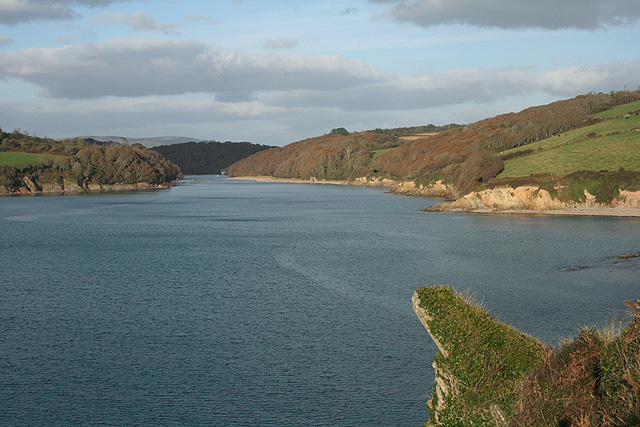
Looking up the estuary at high tide...

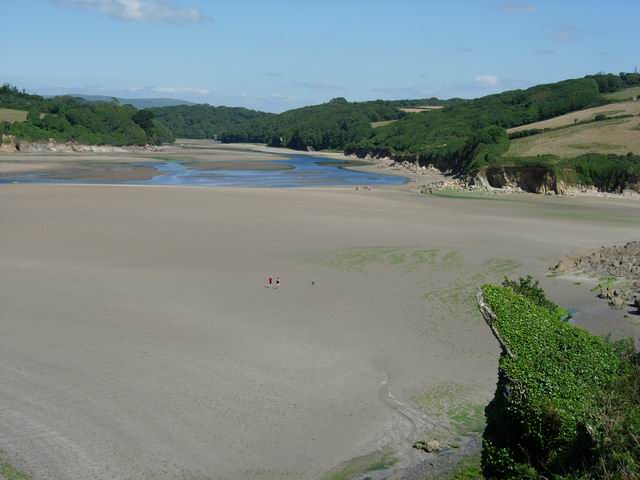
... and at low tide

== The estuary ==
As it passes to the east of the village of Holbeton the Erme becomes a ria with extensive areas of salt marsh and mud that are uncovered at low tide. The geology of the area is mostly slate from the Devonian period. The river enters the English Channel near the villages of Kingston to the east and Mothecombe and Holbeton to the west and at the mouth of the estuary lie the beaches of Wonwell and Mothecombe. The estuary is surrounded by the 5,000 acre Flete Estate.

=== History ===
In 1991 and 1992 some 42 tin ingots were found in the mouth of the estuary on the north side of the West Mary Reef. These date from between 500 BC and 600 AD. Tin mining was in existence on Dartmoor from an early date. Dartmoor tin-mining would have been a major part of the South Devon economy throughout its history.

There is an Iron Age hill fort at Holbury near Holbeton overlooking the estuary from the west and evidence of a very early 11th Century fort and settlement just a little way inland at Oldaport. In the 1950s and again in the 1990s a variety of fragments of "Dark Ages" and Roman pots were discovered on Mothecombe beach.

There are four ruined lime kilns in the estuary; all are in an advanced state of disrepair. Limestone came by sea from Plymouth quarries. Coal arrived on the beach from South Wales and was unloaded to horse-drawn carts. Some was stored in a shed at the top of the Mothecombe slip, but some was loaded into a small barge to move further up the estuary as far as Efford.

From Clyng Corn Mill (now a private house to Orcheton Quay) there used to be a canal which has long since silted up and is now just a small stream. This canal brought goods to and from Modbury and beyond. "Runaway Lane" was the main link between Orcheton Quay and Modbury. The 1809 Ordnance Survey map shows the canal very clearly.

There was a fishing community on Wonwell beach for many years but the houses are now in ruins and overgrown. Professional fishermen worked the beach until the 1960s. The main catch was lobster and crab. These were boiled on the beach and carried to the village of Kingston on donkeys. The withies which were used to make the pots and panniers were grown in willow plats (areas of pollarded willow) in the area.

Many ships have been lost in the area over the centuries. The Salcombe Cannon Wreck of the 1630s is a notable site. A large cast iron Swedish gun dating to 1690–1720 has been found in the estuary. On 15 December 1793, HMS Pigmy went aground on the jagged East Mary rocks, which together with the West Mary Rocks form a mostly submerged bar to the estuary. At the court martial, the vessel's pilot stated that he believed that he was entering Plymouth Sound, some 14 miles west.

==== Smuggling ====
Smuggling activity took place in the estuary. Initially the coast was patrolled by the Riding Officers of the Preventive, supplanted by the coastguards: on the Mothecombe side are the original Coastguard Cottages - just above Coastguard Beach. "Customs Ports" were first set out in 1558 as administrative areas. In 1786 when every part of the coastline came under the jurisdiction of the local "Customs Port", the Plymouth jurisdiction extended as far east as Challaborough and therefore covered the estuary. Records show that the Coastguard Station existed at Mothecombe in 1822 with 5 Boatmen and an Officer. In 1870 the Chief Officer of Coastal Guard at Mothecombe was Robert S Matson. By 1881 the River Erme was included in the Dartmouth "Customs Port". Coastguards were also based in the village of Kingston. The next station going east was at Charlaborough (Ringmore) - now called Challaborough.

==== World War II ====
Persier was hit by a torpedo near to the Eddystone Lighthouse in 1945 and her wreck is just outside the estuary.

In 1940 a detachment of Indian troops were stationed at Woodleigh and there is a remembrance of these troops and their mules delivering barbed wire to Mothecombe for the coastal defences.

There was a memory of a dog setting off mines on the estuary recorded in a publication produced by the Kingston History Society. A platoon of the 5th Buffs Regiment was stationed on Wonwell Beach; some in a Nissen Hut and some in one of the old cottages. One soldier was stationed at the phone box in Kingston to take messages to the beach. There was a mine field at the high-water mark which was fenced on the landward side. Mothecombe Beach had a similar minefield. One of the mines on Wonwell was set off by a missing dog after the platoon at Wonwell had been withdrawn (as the beach was covered from Mothecombe). Others became unstable and also exploded.

The 1919 and 1947 Ordnance Survey maps show a "rifle range" stretching up the estuary from Owen's Point to Pamflete—this may have been related to war time activity.

==== Film locations ====
Filming took part for some of the Hornblower TV series on the Wonwell slip, Wonwell Beach and Mothecombe Beach. International Velvet (1978) has an opening scene across the sands. In 1985 Scobbiscombe Farm, which is above and just to the east of the estuary, was used as a location for the film Revolution which concerned the American War of Independence. The cast included Al Pacino, Donald Sutherland and a whole host of cut out British Red Coats, one of whom found a new home in a local greenhouse for a while. Sense and Sensibility (1995) was shot at various locations on the estuary including Efford House (country home of the "Dashwoods"), Mothecombe House and Mothecombe Beach. Rebecca (1996) was filmed at Mothecombe.

=== Today ===
The estuary is now designated as an Area of Outstanding Natural Beauty, and an Erme Estuary Management Plan has been produced. The South West Coast Path crosses between the slipways on the Wonwell (eastern) and Mothecombe (western) sides of the estuary, but crossing is only possible at low tide - and even then walkers are very likely to get their knees wet. The alternative route by road is some 9 miles around the estuary. The 1947 Ordnance Survey map show this as a vehicular ford between the slipways. There is another ford marked on the 1947 map between Saltercrease and Efford, but this is now said to be too deep to cross.

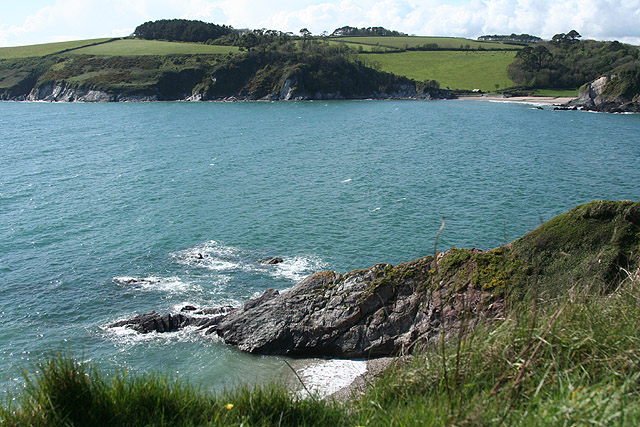
Looking across the mouth of the estuary towards Meadowsfoot Beach

==== Flora and fauna ====
Little egrets are now year-round residents. Curlews, oystercatchers and common shelducks are all regular visitors and kingfishers are often seen above Holbeton. Weaverfish bury themselves in the gravel in the low water.

==== Beaches ====
Mothecombe Beach (also called Meadowsfoot Beach) as of 2017, is open seven days a week. The building on the south side of the beach was a private tea room built in 1873-1875 by Mr H Mildmay for use during private picnics. It is built on the foundations of an early lime kiln. Other private tea houses were built elsewhere on the Flete estate. A little further to the south there is a small circular stone wall which fills with water as the tide comes in. This used to be a swimming pool, but no longer functions as such. A little further on is a WW2 pillbox.

Coastguards Beach and Wonwell Beach are open every day. Coastguards Beach also has a pillbox although it is now almost covered by undergrowth, and the remains of yet another lie a little south of Coastguards beach, but this has been damaged by the sea.

== Sources ==
- Butler, Jeremy (1993). Dartmoor Atlas of Antiquities, Volume 4: The South-East. Exeter: Devon Books. ISBN 978-0-86114-881-3.
