= Addison Lockley =

English rugby union player

- Born: Addison Lockley; 25 October 1991 (age 35) Taunton, England
- Height: 1.98 m (6 ft 6 in)
- Weight: 111 kg (17 st 7 lb; 245 lb)
- School: Ivybridge Community College

Rugby union career
- Position: Lock
- Current team: Provence Rugby
Senior career
Years	Team	Apps	(Points)
2010–2012	Exeter Chiefs	0	(0)
2011–2012	Plymouth Albion	19	(0)
2012–2013	Moseley	22	(5)
2013–2015	Biarritz	27	(0)
2015–2016	Tarbes	29	(5)
2016–	Provence	37	(0)
- Correct as of 20 April 2018
International career
Years	Team	Apps	(Points)
2011	England U20	3	(0)
- Correct as of 18 March 2011

Addison Lockley (born 25 October 1991) is a rugby union player. His position of choice is Lock. He was released from Exeter Chiefs among other players, and will play for Moseley in the 2012–13 season. On 25 April 2013, Lockley would leave Moseley to join top French club Biarritz Olympique in the Top 14 on a two-year contract from 2013/14 season.
