= Alec Finlay =

Scottish-born artist

Alec Finlay (born 14 March 1966) is a Scottish-born artist currently based in Edinburgh. He is a son of Sue Finlay and Ian Hamilton Finlay. Finlay's work takes various forms and media, including poetry, sculpture, collage, audio-visual, neon, and new technologies; often it reflects on human engagement with landscape.

His work has been widely exhibited at The Bluecoat, Tate Modern, Norwich Castle Museum, ARC Gallery (Sofia), and HICA (Highland Institute for Contemporary Art). In 2010, Finlay was shortlisted for the Northern Art Prize. In 2012 he was a finalist in the first annual ALICE awards, nominated for his 2009 project white peak | dark peak (Public Art Category).

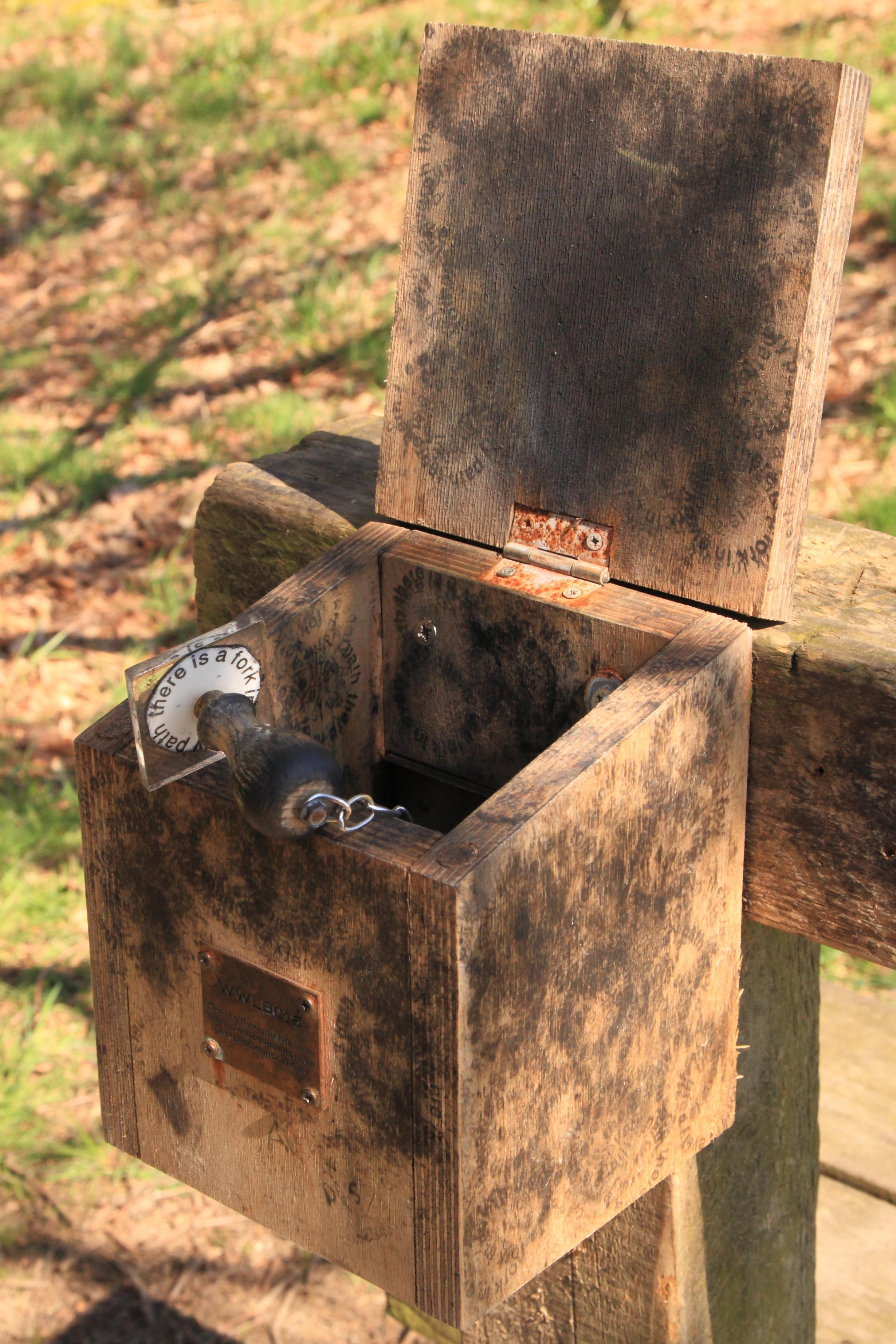
Circles through the path world wide rubber stamp letterbox poem: "There is a fork in every path".

== Artistic style ==
Finlay's use of nest boxes, botanic labels, clothing name-tapes and wind turbines are examples of ways in which Finlay embeds smaller elements into wider landscapes to create 'families' or 'colonies' of work, emphasising the experiential and lived. He has produced letterboxes with circular poems on the stamps. Often these works are collaborative, sometimes mapped directly onto the landscape, at others embedded socially, or accessible on-line using QR code technology. Finlay produced his first Morning Star Folio in 1990. He has published over twenty books, and has won three Scottish Design Awards (Best Typography, Best Book, Chairman's Award, 2000).

In conversation with Gavin Morrison of Atopia Projects, Finlay described the importance of collaboration to his practice, explaining that the artist's identity 'has no defining value in terms of an autographed activity, as such. [...] There are boundaries that can be marked, but also sparks that leap between consciousnesses. The work is not within one consciousness. That is a fact. Yet it is still always filtered through mine, and this is an endlessly subtle and complex and delightful experience. It is evident in the different ways in which I could refer to collaboration and participation, their contradictory aspects of election, inflection, infection - one could consider my work as an overarching encirclement of other people's work, where what they make appears under my name; as an animation of others, as I spark their creativity; and as a sharing of consciousness, through identifiable poetic or artistic forms (wind blown clouds, names, haiku and so on). I do not find the information that the activity is producing is really suggesting that we try to pin down authorship, and for me it has become increasingly clear that the material was shared consciousness, which is after all what all art is in some way about.'

== Reviews ==
- Review of the Morning Star Folios, in Bryan, Tom (ed.), Northwords, Issue 8, Ross and Cromarty District Council, 1996, pp. 38 & 39

== See also ==
- Letterboxing
