= Holbury, Holbeton =

Iron Age hill fort in Devon, England

Coordinates: 50.335°N 3.949°W

Holbury is an Iron Age hill fort situated close to Holbeton in Devon, England. The fort is situated on a hilltop east of the village approximately 95 metres (310 ft) above sea level overlooking the Erme Estuary.
