= Harry Spencer (rugby union) =

- Born: 12 July 1988 (age 38)
- Height: 6 ft 8 in (2.04 m)
- Weight: 18 st 6 lb (117 kg)
- School: Ivybridge Community College

Rugby union career
- Position: Lock
Senior career
Years	Team	Apps	(Points)
- Plymouth Albion
–	Saracens		
–	Tarbes		
–	RC Chalon		
–	Newcastle Falcons		

Harry Spencer (born 12 July 1988) is a rugby union player, with his position of choice being Lock. He began playing Rugby at school in Plymouth, England, where he initially played on the Wing before switching to Second Row. Spencer began his professional career at Plymouth Albion, before moving to Saracens, competing in the English Premiership. In 2010 Spencer joined Tarbes in Pro D2 in France. He followed that with a year in Federale 2 before signing for RC Chalon in July 2012. After 18 months with RC Chalon, he joined Newcastle Falcons as injury cover for the remainder of the 2013/14 Aviva Premiership season.

In June 2014 Harry returned to France, signing with AS Macon in Fédérale 1. He then moved to Stade Rouennais in the summer of 2015, where he helped them to the quarter-finals of Fédérale 1.
