= Stuart Hooper =

English rugby union player

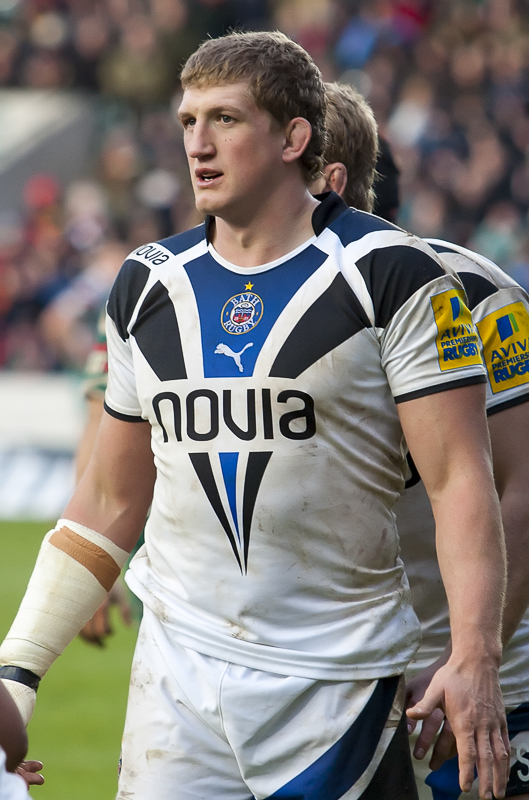
- Hooper playing for Bath vs Leicester Tigers at the Aviva Premiership in 2012
- Born: Stuart Hooper; 18 November 1981 (age 45) Exeter, England
- Height: 1.96 m (6 ft 5 in)
- Weight: 113 kg (17 st 11 lb)
- School: Ivybridge Community College; Queen Elizabeth's Community College

Rugby union career
- Position: Lock
- Current team: Bath
Senior career
Years	Team	Apps	(Points)
1999-2003	Saracens	43	(5)
2003-2008	Leeds Carnegie	113	(40)
2008-2016	Bath	177	(50)
- Correct as of 4 April 2015
International career
Years	Team	Apps	(Points)
2005	England Saxons		
Coaching career
- Years: Team
- 2019-2022: Bath (Director of Rugby)

Stuart Hooper (born 18 November 1981) is a former rugby union player and then director of rugby at Bath Rugby. He last played for Bath Rugby in the Aviva Premiership in April 2016. He is currently the co-Chief Executive Officer for the proposed breakaway rugby franchise R360.

== Early life ==
Born in Exeter, Hooper played basketball at county level until he was 16, before opting for rugby on his move to the specialist sports campus at Ivybridge Community College.

== Playing career ==
=== Saracens: 1999–2003 ===
Hooper broke into the Saracens team whilst still a teenager and played alongside Frenchman Abdel Benazzi in the second row.

=== Leeds: 2003–2007 ===
After making over 30 appearances or so for Saracens, he made a surprise move to Leeds Tykes in June 2003. He made his Tykes debut against Bath on 14 September 2003. During his time at Leeds he helped them win the 2004–05 Powergen Cup, where he started in the final.

In June 2005, Hooper was called up for England Saxons against France and was part of their Churchill Cup success in Canada. Hooper captained the 2009 Saxons side in the Churchill Cup.

Hooper was appointed as captain of Leeds Tykes for the 2005–06 Guinness Premiership season, and in doing so became the youngest captain in the league.

=== Bath Rugby: 2007–2016 ===
In April 2006, Hooper re-signed with Leeds, but left at the end of the 2007–08 season to join Bath. On 5 July 2011 Hooper was named the new Bath club captain for the 2011–12 season.

Hooper retired with immediate effect from all rugby under medical advice on 14 April 2016 as the result of a back injury.

== Coaching career ==
=== Bath Rugby: 2016–2023 ===
On 30 August 2016, it was announced that Hooper would take on the role of Performance and Player Development Director at Bath. On 7 May 2019, it was announced that Hooper would take on the role of Director of Rugby for Bath at the start of the 2019–20 season, following the departure of former director of rugby Todd Blackadder.

Bath finished 4th in the 2019–20 season, reaching the Premiership playoffs for the first time since 2015. However, the 2021–22 season proved particularly challenging, as Bath finished last in the Premiership table, managing only five wins in 24 games. Ahead of the 2022–23 season, South African coach Johann van Graan signed a long-term contract to join Bath. He was initially set to work under Hooper as Head Coach, replacing Neal Hatley, who transitioned to Forwards Coach, while Hooper retained his position as Director of Rugby. However, after Bath's historic 64–0 loss to rivals Gloucester Rugby near the end of the 2021–22 season, a restructuring of the club's leadership took place. Hooper moved from Director of Rugby to the newly created role of General Manager, with Van Graan becoming Head of Rugby and gaining full control of the first team for the 2022–23 season. Hooper departed this role and left the club after just one season as General Manager.

== Post-retirement ==
Since retirement from coaching, Hooper has been involved with the proposed breakaway global rugby franchise R360. In June 2025, he was forced from his position as a senior administrator with the England and Wales Cricket Board after backlash from his association with the proposal. Since October 2025, he has served as co-Chief Executive Officer of the franchise. In November 2025, it was announced that the franchise start date would be postponed to 2028 amid doubts about its ability to recruit players and the viability of its commercial model. As of December 2025, Hooper remains one of the largest shareholders of AOTG Sports, the company behind the proposal, alongside sports agent Mark Spoors.
