= Sam Hill (rugby union) =

English rugby union player (born 1993)

- Born: 14 July 1993 (age 33) Exeter, Devon, England
- Height: 1.84 m (6 ft 0 in)
- Weight: 103 kg (16 st 3 lb; 227 lb)
- School: Queen Elizabeth's School; Ivybridge Community College
- Occupation: Professional rugby union player

Rugby union career
- Position: Centre
Senior career
Years	Team	Apps	(Points)
2010–2020	Exeter Chiefs	147	(55)
2020–2023	Sale Sharks	32	(0)
2024–	Houston SaberCats	8	(5)
- Correct as of 30 June 2024
International career
Years	Team	Apps	(Points)
2010–2011	England U18	9	(5)
2012–2013	England U20	18	(25)
2014–2016	England A	2	(0)
- Correct as of 17 June 2016

Sam Hill (born 14 July 1993) is an English rugby union player who plays as a centre for Houston SaberCats in Major League Rugby.

== Club career ==
Hill attended Cheriton Bishop Primary School before moving on to Queen Elizabeths Community College in Crediton. Having played for Crediton RFC until the age of 15, Hill gained selection for England under-16s and moved to Ivybridge Community College sixth form for two years.

Hill spent the early years of his professional career dual-registered with Cornish Pirates to aid his player development and scored three tries during the 2012–13 RFU Championship.

On 28 January 2012 Hill made his first start for Exeter in an Anglo-Welsh Cup fixture against Wasps. He scored a try in their 2014–15 European Rugby Challenge Cup quarter-final victory over Newcastle Falcons and started the semi-final elimination against Gloucester.

Hill started for the Exeter side that lost to Leicester Tigers in the final of the 2016–17 Anglo-Welsh Cup. The following season he came off the bench as Exeter lost against Saracens in the 2017–18 Premiership Rugby final to finish league runners up.

On 13 March 2020, Hill left Exeter Chiefs to join Premiership rivals Sale Sharks. In his first season with the club he played in their 2020–21 Premiership Rugby semi-final elimination. In May 2023 after three years with Sale it was announced that Hill had left the club.

Hill joined Houston SaberCats for the 2024 Major League Rugby season.

== International career ==
Hill was a regular for England juniors going back to his try scoring debut against the Namibia invitational XV. Hill played for the England U20 side that won the 2012 Six Nations Under 20s Championship and scored a try during the tournament against Wales. Later that year he was a member of the squad that finished seventh at the 2012 IRB Junior World Championship.

Hill started all five games for England as they retained the 2013 Six Nations Under 20s Championship. He was included in the squad for the 2013 IRB Junior World Championship and scored a try in the final as England defeated Wales to become junior World Champions for the first time.

In January 2014 Hill started for England A in a defeat against Ireland Wolfhounds. Later that year in May 2014 he received his first call up to the senior England squad for a training camp prior to their tour of New Zealand.

Hill was again included in the England squad by new coach Eddie Jones for the 2016 Six Nations Championship although ultimately remained uncapped. Later that year he played for the England A side that completed a series win during their 2016 summer tour of South Africa.
