= William Crossing =

British writer

William Crossing (1847–1928) was a writer and chronicler of Dartmoor and the lives of its inhabitants. He lived successively in South Brent, Brentor and Mary Tavy but died in Plymouth, Devon.

== Early life ==
Crossing was born in Plymouth on 14 November 1847. Early in his youth he was fond of Dartmoor, his early associations centring on the south-west of the moor, in the neighbourhood of Sheepstor, Walkhampton, Meavy, and Yannadon. He acquired a taste for antiquities from his mother. He later went on to explore Tavistock, Coryton, Lydford, Okehampton, and the northern borders of Dartmoor, as well as South Brent, on its southern verge.

After finishing his schooling in Plymouth, he went to the Independent College at Taunton, and then returned to finish his education at the Mannamead School (later called Plymouth College).

His earliest literary efforts were in fiction: "thrilling romances", composed for the delectation of his schoolfellows. His first essay in poetry was at the age of fourteen, when a poem of his appeared in the pages of Young England, December 1861.

In 1863 he went for a short coastal voyage to Wales, and gained a liking for the sea; in 1864 he joined a vessel bound for Canada, and had a narrow escape, nearly being crushed by an iceberg during the night. Returning from this voyage, he took to business pursuits in Plymouth, and then recommenced his Dartmoor explorations.

== Later life and writings ==
In 1872 he married and settled down at South Brent. In 1871 he had begun making notes about his rambles, but without any systematic arrangement; after his marriage he seems to have become more methodical, and to have decided to write a book descriptive of the moorland district. He published numerous other works in the 1890s, and his Guide to Dartmoor, illustrated by Philip Guy Stevens, in 1909. He was much afflicted by rheumatism in the last 25 years of his life, and in 1921 his wife died. From July 1925 to his death Crossing was an invalid. He died at Plymouth, 3 September 1928.

He is now considered one of the best authorities on Dartmoor and its antiquities, having made it the subject of his life's work. He was one of the earliest members of the Dartmoor Preservation Association, joining it immediately on its formation.

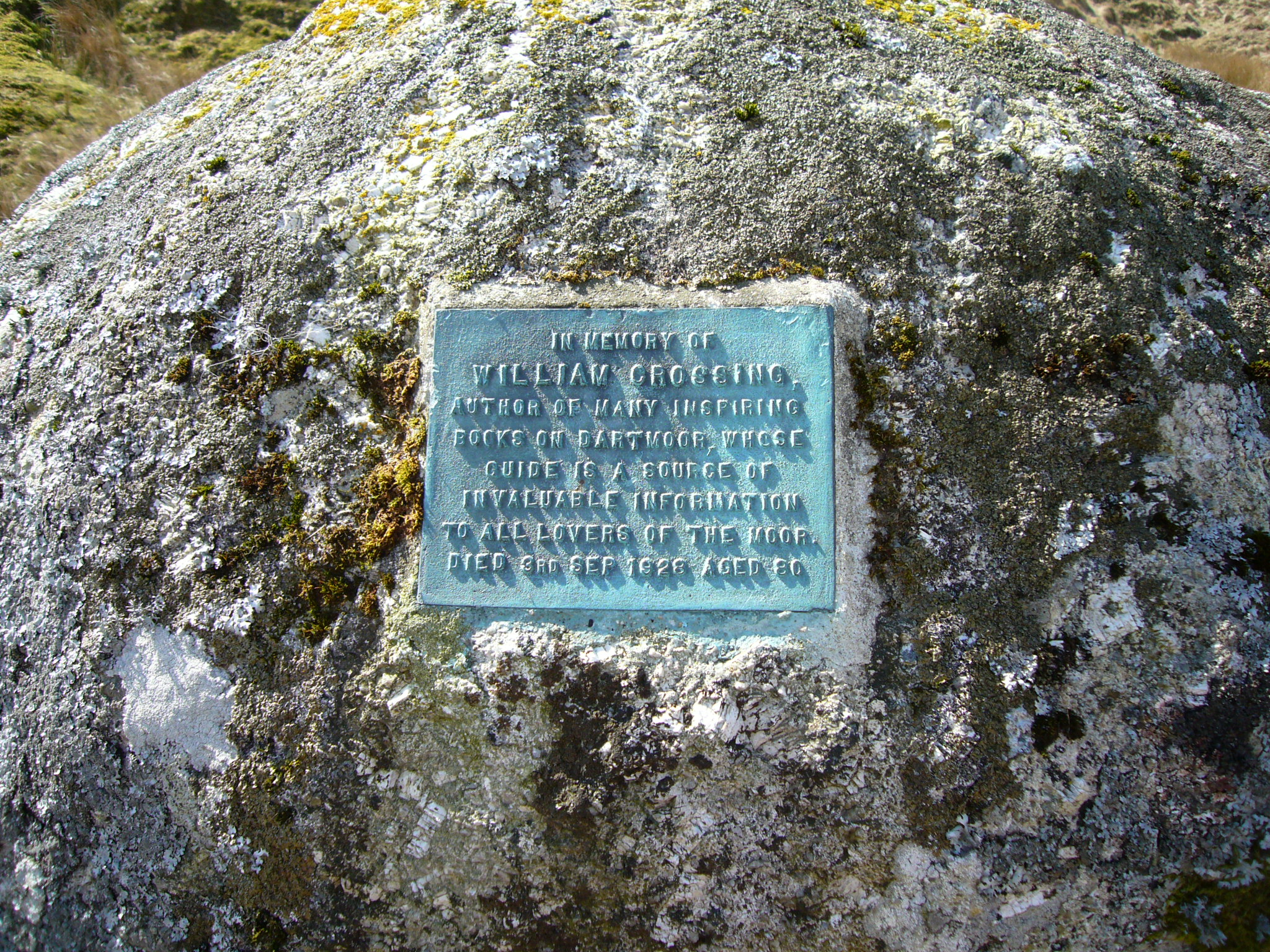
Memorial plaque at Duck's Pool

It is quite probable that he effectively started the popularity of the modern pursuit of letterboxing. In his book Guide to Dartmoor he refers to what is likely to have been the first letter box. It was placed at Cranmere Pool on northern Dartmoor by a local guide in 1854. In Crossing's memory in 1938 a plaque and letterbox were placed at Duck's Pool on the southern moor by some individuals and members of a walking club known as Dobson's Moormen. He was buried with his wife at Mary Tavy: his house at Mary Tavy bears a commemorative tablet unveiled in 1952.

The style of Crossing's work in Guide to Dartmoor has similarities to the much more recent work of Alfred Wainwright. The hand-drawn sketches of views and rough maps of walks together with the descriptive nature of the walks are like those of the Wainwright guides to the Lake District (see Lakeland Guides).

== Books ==
- Leaves from Sherwood, etc.; original poems. Plymouth, 1868
- The Ancient Crosses of Dartmoor; with a Description of their Surroundings; Exeter, 1884. An expansion of a series of articles which originally appeared in the Western Antiquary.
- Amid Devonia's Alps; or, Wanderings and Adventures on Dartmoor. Plymouth, 1888
- Tales of the Dartmoor Pixies: Glimpses of Elfin Haunts and Antics. 1890
- The Land of Stream and Tor. Plymouth, 1891. (For private circulation)
- Crockern Tor and the Ancient Stannary Parliament. Exeter, 1892
- Old Stone Crosses of the Dartmoor Borders. Exeter and London, 1892
- The Chronicles of Crazy Well. Plymouth, 1893
- The Ocean Trail. Plymouth, 1894
- Widey Court. Plymouth, 1895
- A Hundred Years on Dartmoor. Plymouth 1901
- The Western Gate of Dartmoor: Tavistock and its Surroundings. London, 1903
- Gems in a Granite Setting. Plymouth, 1905
- From a Dartmoor Cot. London, 1906
- Crossing's Guide to Dartmoor. Plymouth, 1909. (Republished 1990, Peninsula Press, Newton Abbot, ISBN 1-872640-16-8)
- Crossing's Guide to Dartmoor, the 1912 edition reprinted with new introd. by Brian Le Messurier. Dawlish: David & Charles, 1965 (The third edition was published at Exeter in 1914 and was still in print until about 1940)
- Folk Rhymes of Devon. London, 1911
- Cranmere: The Legendary Story of Binjie Gear and other Poems. London, 1926

Posthumous works

- Crossing's Dartmoor Worker. Newton Abbot, 1966. A collection of twenty newspaper articles originally published in The Western Morning News in 1903 under the title "Presentday Life on Dartmoor". The book details the activities of a number of workers on the moor, such as the farmers, the dry-stone wall builders, the peat-cutters, the warreners, and miners.
- Dartmoor's Early Historic and Medieval Remains. Brixham: Quay, 1987. (A collection of articles originally published in West Country newspapers during 1905)
