= Duck's Pool, Dartmoor =

Depression on Dartmoor, Devon, England

Coordinates: 50.49380°N 3.94130°W

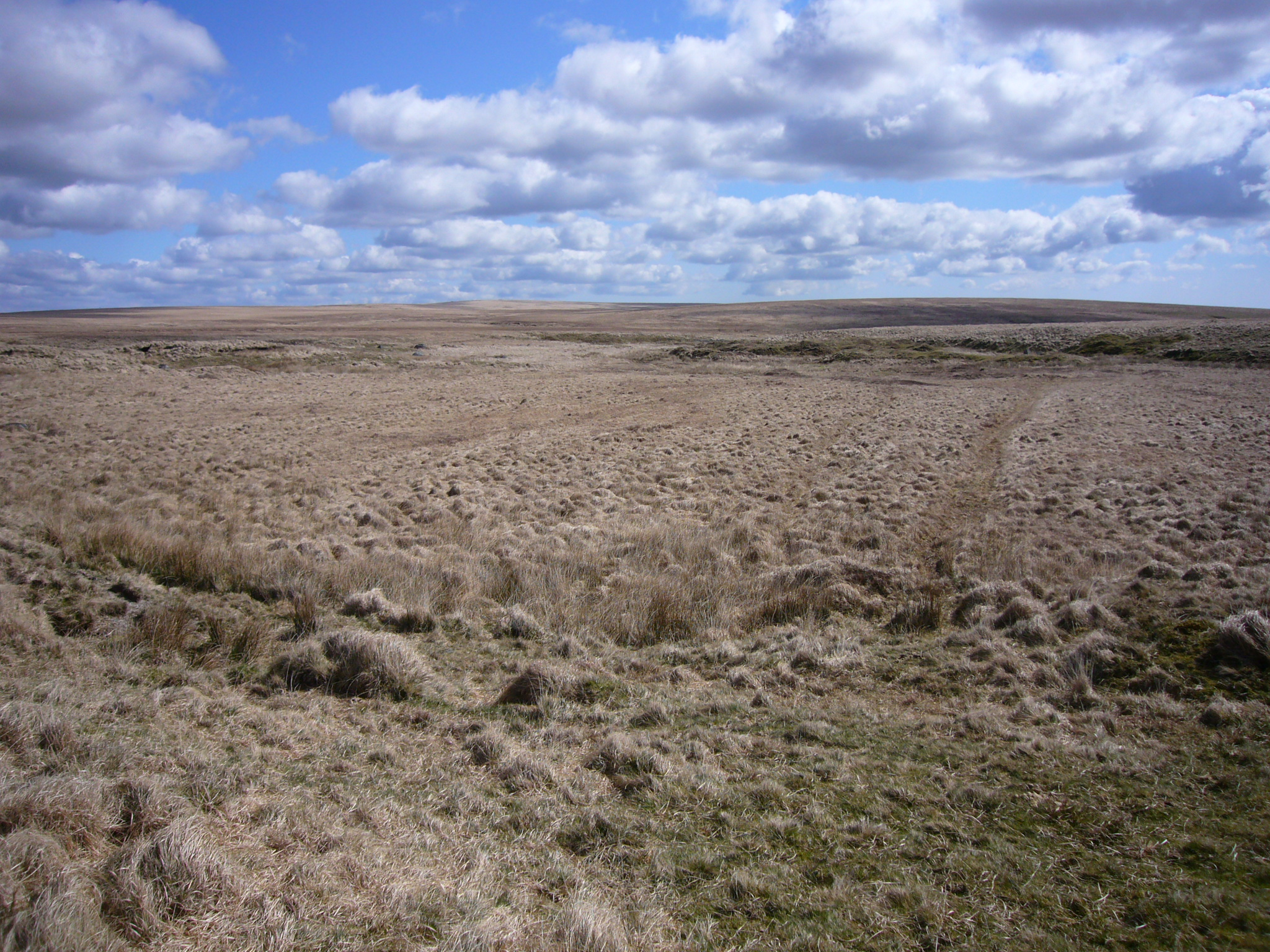
View over Duck's Pool looking south east

Duck's Pool is a small depression set in a remote location in the southern half of Dartmoor, Devon, England at grid reference SX624678. It lies between the sources of the River Plym and the River Erme.

No record exists of it having been a water-filled pool although there is a suggestion that it was drained by tin miners. However, in all but the driest periods, the area is usually boggy, and may have a small amount of standing water. The name may be derived from the use of "duck" as a generic term for waterfowl.

At the end of the Pool there is the remains of a tinners' hut. Approximately 500 metres (550 yd) downstream to the east are the remains of an old blowing house roughly 4 metres (13 ft 1 in) by 6 metres (19 ft 8 in). A number of Dartmoor authors suggest that it may be the one recorded as being in use in the Forester's Accounts of 1532. This working may have been responsible for the draining referred to above. The area from the Pool to the River Erme has been extensively worked by tinners.

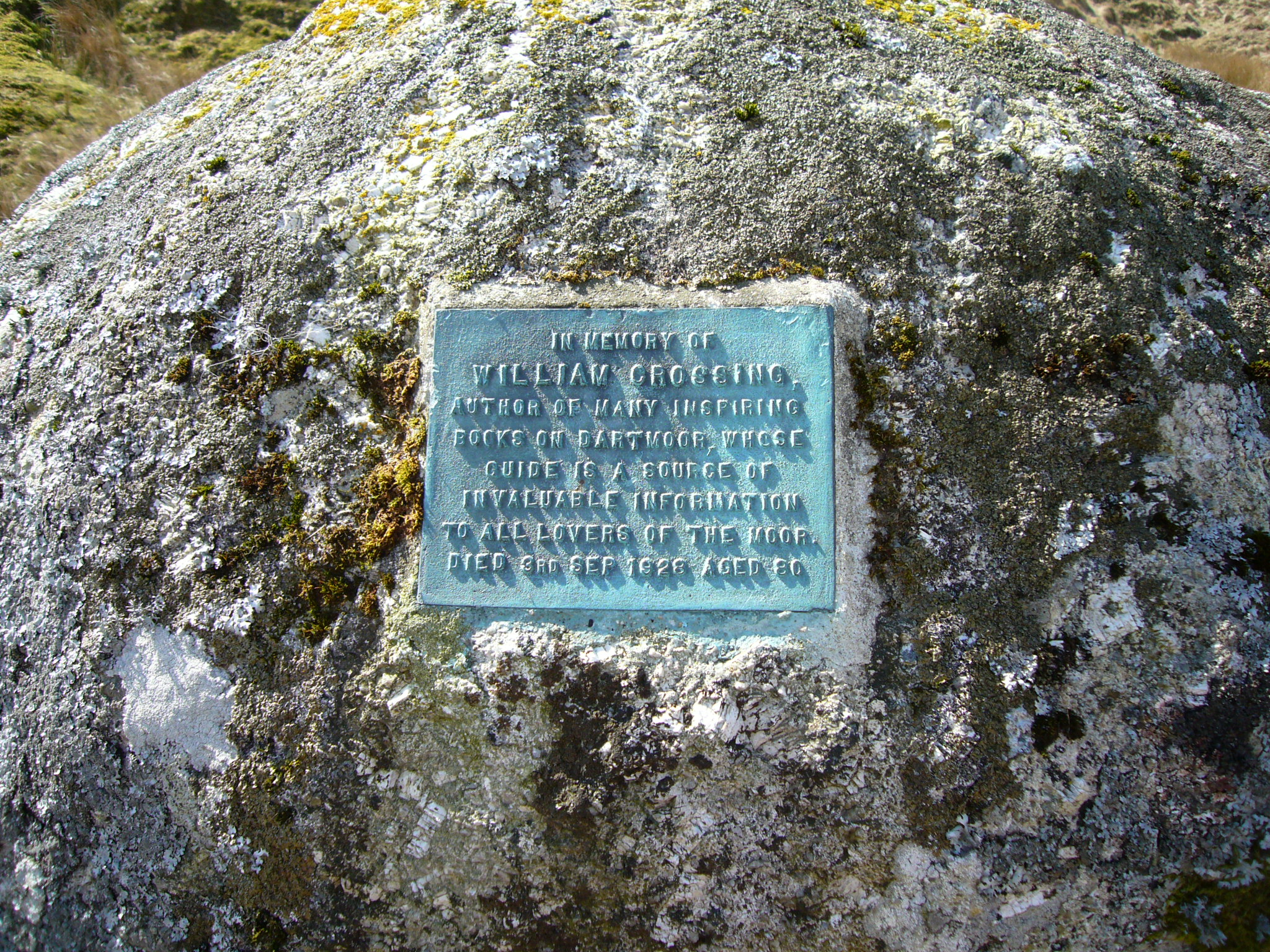
Memorial plaque to William Crossing

In memory of Dartmoor author William Crossing a plaque and letterbox were placed at Duck's Pool by some members of a walking club known as Dobson's Moormen and other people in 1938.
