= Queen Elizabeth's School, Crediton =

Queen Elizabeth's Academy Trust
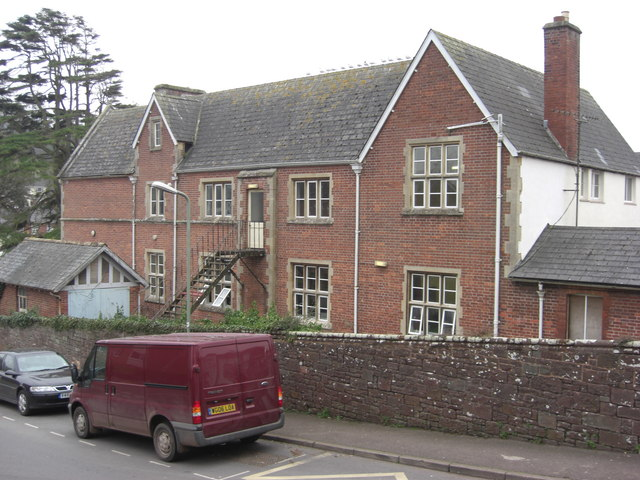

Location
- Western Road; Crediton, Devon, EX17 3LU; England; 50.79192°N 3.6661°W

Information
- Type: Academy
- Local authority: Devon
- Specialist: Technology; Humanities (secondary)
- Department for Education URN: 136646 Tables
- Ofsted: Reports
- Acting Headteacher: Paula Smith
- Gender: Coeducational
- Age: 11 to 18
- Enrolment: 1303
- Website: www.qe.devon.sch.uk

Queen Elizabeth's School is an academy school, with a sixth-form, in Crediton, Devon. It has 1300 students. It was formed as a comprehensive school in the early 1970s by a merger of The Shelley Secondary Modern with the Queen Elizabeth's Grammar School. Since 2023, it has been a European Parliament Ambassador School.

== History ==
The grammar school was founded in 1547 and started teaching in 1572 with 10 pupils. The grammar school moved to new buildings in 1861, and merged with the girls' high school in 1966.

The college's coat of arms shows the figure of Saint Boniface, the patron saint of the town.

The school gained academy status on 1 April 2011.

The school previously had state boarding provision, but this was closed in 2019.

== Ofsted inspection judgements ==
- 2014: Good.
- 2018: Requires Improvement.
- 2022: Good.

As of 2023, the 2022 inspection is the most recent one.

== Buildings ==
A new humanities block composed primarily of permanent classroom "blocks" (lowered onto each other by crane) was opened in 2010 to replace the old Quad courts. In 2011 the upper site technology blocks, hosting food technology, textiles, graphic products and product design, were refurbished.

== Notable alumni ==
- Sam Hill (born 1993), rugby player
- Lee Schofield (born 1979), nature writer
- Marcus Street, rugby player
- Harry Treadaway (born 1984), actor
- Luke Treadaway (born 1984), actor
- Fred Vahrman (born 1990), musician
- Sam Way (born 1988), model
- Jack Yeandle (born 1989), rugby player
