= List of Dartmoor tors and hills =

Landscape features in southwestern Britain

This is a list of Dartmoor tors and hills. Dartmoor is a National Park in South West England that contains many granite outcrops of many different sizes. The main authority (other than the OS map) is "Dartmoor Tors and Rocks" by Ken Ringwood.

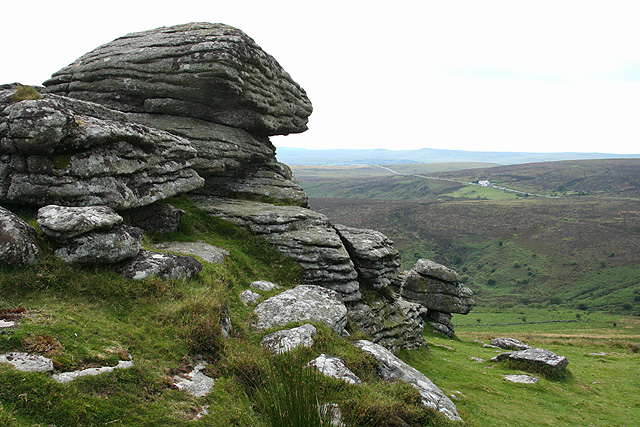
Birch Tor, with the Warren House Inn in the distance

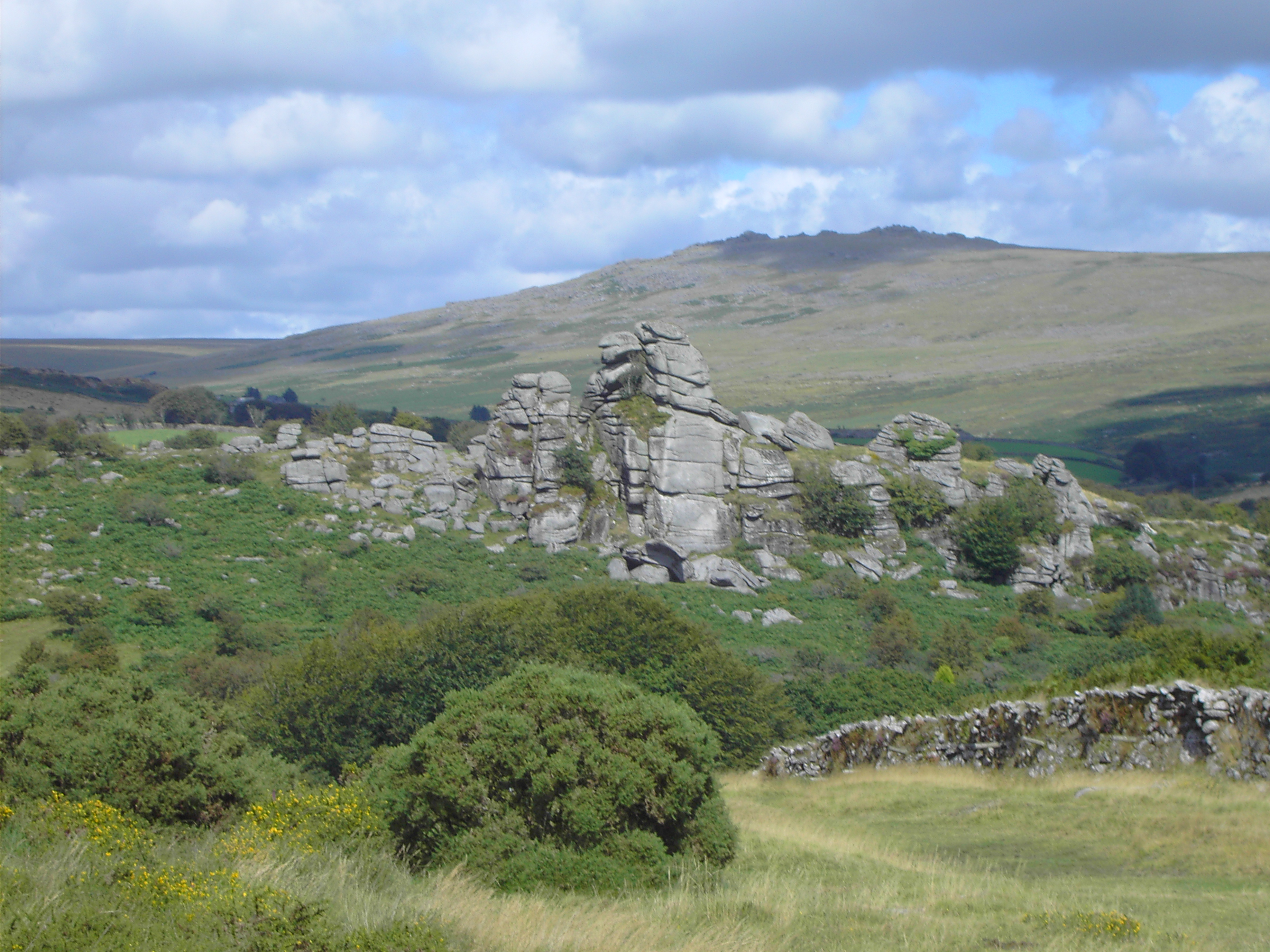
Vixen Tor, with Great Mis Tor beyond

== A–B ==
- A Headstone SX620672
- Aish Ridge SX681609
- Aish Tor SX702715
- Aller Brook Tor (Outcrop) SX678719
- Amicombe Hill (Kitty Tor upper) SX578857
- Arch Tor SX634782
- Arms Tor SX541863
- Ashbury Hill
- Ashbury Tor SX604942
- Assycombe Hill SX665820
  (boundary marker; no tor visible)
- Ausewell Rocks SX735717
- Bag Tor SX762758
- Bagga Tor SX548805
- Barn Hill Rocks SX534746
- Barracott Tor SX739820
- Batteridge Hill
- Beacon Hill
- Beacon Rocks (Ugborough Beacon) SX668591
- Beardown Tors SX602774
- Bee Tor SX708844
- Bel Tor SX696730
- Bell Tor SX730779
- Bellever Tor SX645764
- Belstone Tors SX614921
- Bench Tor or Benjy Tor SX691718
- Bennah Hill SX825840
- Bearacleave Tor SX816797
- Berra Tor SX553679
- Billy's Tor
- Big Rock SX526799
- Birch Tor SX687815
- Black Dunghill SX581775
- Black Hill (2)
  - NW Dartmoor (584 m) SX604846
  - E Dartmoor (412m) near Manaton at SX761787
- Black Ridge SX593854
- Black Rock SX531853
- Black Rocks SX629670
- Black Tor (4)
  - Near Shipley Tor In the south of the moor SX680635.
  - Near High Willhays In the NW of the moor SX566895
  - Near Walkhampton In the west of the moor SX574718.
  - Near Butterdon Hill, Ivybridge SX655584
- Blacka Tor SX666750
- Blackadon Tor SX718734
- Blackalder Tor SX567616
- Blackingstone Rock SX786855
- Blackslade Rock SX725752
- Blakey Tor or Colden Tor SX612736
- Bonehill Rocks SX731774
- Bottor Rock SX826804
- Boulters Tor SX525780
- Bovey Rock SX734765
- Bowden Tor SX817803
- Bowerman's Nose SX742805
- Bracken Tor (hill) SX588939
- Braddon Tor SX622799 Also known as Hoax Tor, Samuel's Tor and Broad Down Tor.
- Branscombe's Loaf SX553891
- Brat Tor SX539856 (Widgery Tor, Lur Tor or Brai Tor also)
- Brazen Tor or Brouzen Tor SX547807
- Brent Fore Hill SX669620
- Brent Hill SX703617
- Brent Tor SX471804
- Brimage Tor
- Brimhill Tor SX518795
- Broad Down SX632805
- Broad Rock SX618672
- Broada Stones SX617817
- Brousentor SX547807
- Buckland Beacon SX734731
- Buck Tor SX478697
- Buckator SX480701
- Bullaton Rock SX796822
- Burrator SX553679
- Butterdon Hill (2)
  - Near Teign Gorge (Cranbrook Castle) SX750844
  - Near Western Beacon SX655587
- Buttern Hill SX653885
- Buttern Rocks SX652887

== C–E ==
- Cadworthy Tor or Oxen Tor SX541641
- Callisham Tor SX538664
- Cater's Beam SX631688
- Cathanger Rock SX683749
- Cator SX670777
- Calveslake Tor SX609677
- Chase Wood Rocks SX722716
- Chat Tor SX556853
- Church Rock SX558754
- Cherrybrook Rocks SX620796
- Chinkwell Tor SX729781
- Chub Tor SX520661
- Claig Tor SX549677
- Claret Tor SX666587
- Clay Tor SX568781
- Cleave Tor SX608940
- Cleft Rock SX726709
- Click Tor SX580684
- Cocks Hill SX568789
- Coffin Stone SX677732
- Collard Tor SX557622
- Combe Tor SX685871
- Combeshead Tor or Combshead Tor SX588688
- Combestone Tor or Coombestone Tor SX670718
- Commons Hill SX825851
- Conies Down Tor SX589791
- Coombe Tor SX686872
- Corndon Tor SX687742
- Corndon North Tor SX687747
- Corn Ridge SX552889
- Cosdon Hill or Cosdon Beacon SX636915
- Courton Tor SX613737
- Cox Tor (Cocks' Tor). SX531762
- Cramber Tor SX584712
- Crane Hill SX622690
- Crane Tor
- Creber's Rock SX664586
- Criptor (Crip Tor) SX554726
- Cripdon Down Tors SX734807
- Crockern Tor SX616758
- Crow Tor SX605788
- Crownhill Tor SX576609
- Cuckoo Rock SX584686
- Curtery Clitters SX591897
- Cut Hill SX598827
- Devil's Tor SX597797
- Dewerstone Hill (The Dewerstone or Dewerstone Rock) SX537638
- Dinger Tor SX586881
- Doe Tor SX541849
- Down Ridge SX649716
- Down Tor SX580694
- Dream Tor
- Eagle Rock SX724722
- Easdon Hill SX733822
- Easdon South Tor SX729819
- Easdon Tor (Includes Whooping Rock) SX729823
- East Hill, South of Okehampton
- East Mill Tor SX600897
- East Tor SX564724
- Eastern Tor SX584665
- Eastern White Barrow SX665652
- Ellimore Tor SX775814
- Elsford Rock SX786830
- Emsworthy Rocks SX750768

== F–G ==
- Feather Tor SX535742
- Figgie Daniel (On Easdon Down) SX734822
- Fitches Holt SX753768
- Flat Tor SX609817
- Foggintor SX567736. Quarried out.
- Fordsland Ledge SX575888
- Fox Tor (2)
  - SE of Princetown SX626698. (This is the better-known one.)
  - Near Mary Tavy SX514788
- Foxworthy Tor SX761821
- Frenchbeer Rock SX671854
- Fur Tor (or Vurretor)SX588831
- Fur Tor (Walkhampton) SX564724
- Furze Tor SX525779
- Ger Tor SX547831
- Giant's Hill
- Gibbet Hill SX503811
- Gibby Combe Tor SX687687
- Gidleigh Tor SX671878
- Gipsy Rock SX543705
- Gladstone Rock SX802812
- Goat Rock SX476899
- Gradner Rocks SX781802
- Grea Tor SX754782 (Not shown on all modern maps, though nearby Greator Rocks is.)
- Greator Rocks SX747786
- Great Combe Tors SX522775
- Great Hound Tor SX743790
- Great Gnats' Head SX616679
- Great Kneeset SX589859
- Great Links Tor SX552868
- Great Mis Tor SX563769
- Great Nodden SX539874
- Great Rock SX821818
- Great Staple Tor SX542760
- Great Trowlesworthy Tor SX580643
- Green Hill SX636678
- Green Tor SX562864
- Gren Tor SX551880
- Gripper's Hill SX686655
- Gutter Tor SX578669

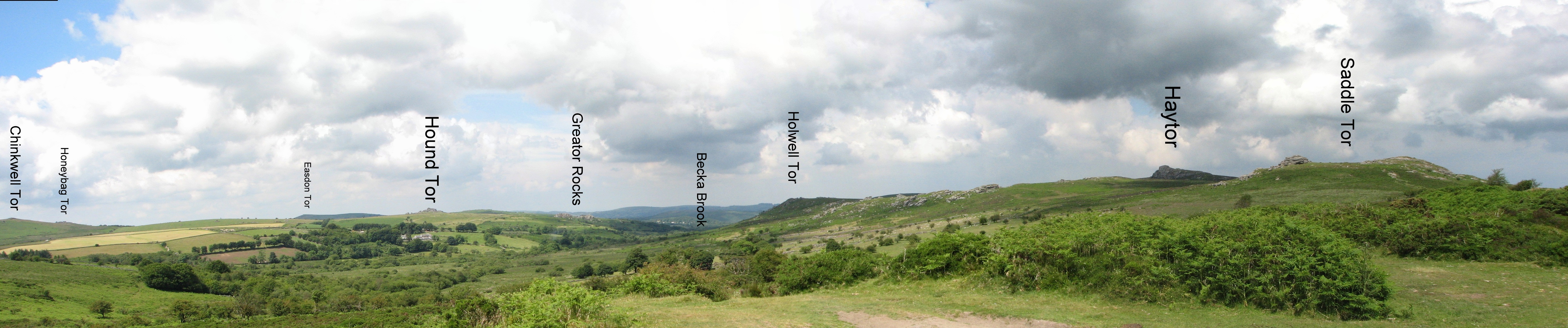
Tors visible looking north from near the head of the Becka Brook, eastern Dartmoor

== H–K ==
- Hameldown Beacon SX708789
- Hameldown Tor SX703807
- Hammerslake Tor SX772815
- Hampster Tor or part of High Willhays SX579894
- Hangershell Rock SX654594
- Hangingstone Hill SX617861
- Hare Tor SX551842
- Hart Tor (2)
  - Walkhampton Common SX581720
  - Okehampton Common SX601911
- Hartland Tor SX642799
- Harton Chest (Lustleigh Cleave) SX767817
- Hartor Tors (also Hart Tor, Harter Tors) SX599678 and SX602677
- Hawk's Tor SX552625
- Hayne Down Tors SX742803
- Haytor or Hay Tor (also Hey Tor; Haytor Rocks) SX757770
- Heckwood Tor SX537738
- Hedge Down Tor SX734785
- Heltor Rock SX800870
- Hemstone Rocks SX646835
- Hen Tor SX594693
- Hepstock Rocks SX732715
- Herne Hole Tor SX578745
- Hexton Tor SX581637
- High Tor SX512786
- Higher Dunnagoat Tor SX557865
- Higher Tor SX613917
- Higher White Tor SX619786
- High Willhays (or High Willes, High Willows, Highest Tor, Hight Will). SX580895
- Hingston Hill SX585691
- Hingston Rocks SX769857
- Hockinston Tor SX700719
- Hole Rock SX758786
- Holne Ridge SX669706
- Hollow Tor (2)
  - Near Top Tor SX731762
  - Princetown SX571745
- Holwell Tor SX751777
- Holwell Rocks SX744784
- Homerton Hill SX561905
- Honeybag Tor SX728787
- Hookney Tor SX699813
- Hound Tor (2)
  - Hound Tor or Round Tor (Throwleigh) SX628899
  - S of Manaton
- Huccaby Tor SX655740
- Hucken Tor SX549739
- Hunt Tor SX557875
- Hunts Tor SX722897
- Hunter's Tor (2)
  - Teign Gorge SX721897
  - Lustleigh Cleave SX760825
- Hurston Castle Tor SX683833
- Hyner Rocks or Hyner Tor, Hennock SX831818
- Ingra Tor SX555721
- Ivy Tor SX628936
- Kelly Mine Tor SX796818
- Kennick Rocks
- Kennon Hill SX643893
- Kent's Tor SX516794
- Kes Tor or Kestor Rock SX665863
- King Tor SX710815
- King's Tor SX557739
- Kingshead Tor SX709782
- Kit Rocks SX613827
- Kitty Tor SX587875
- Knattaborough Tor SX610909

== L–M ==
- Ladybrook Tor or Ottery Tor SX624923
- Lakehead Hill SX643777
- Langworthy Tor SX705768
- Langcombe Hill SX618657
- Latchell Tor SX857808
- Laughter Tor (Lough Tor) SX653757
- Launceston Tor or Landscore Tor SX726722
- Leather Tor or Lether Tor SX562700
- Lee Moor (trig point) SX603645
- Leedon Tor or Leeden Tor SX563719
- Legis Tor SX571656
- Leigh Tor SX712715
- Leighon Tor SX758786
- Leusdon Tor (includes the three piles) SX709733
- Linhay Hill SX769717
- Lints Tor SX580874
- Littaford Tors SX616769
- Little Bee Tor SX615771
- Little Boulters Tor SX523780
- Little Combe Tor SX521777
- Little Cox Tor SX526761
- Little Crow Tor SX606784
- Little Down Tor SX576693
- Little Emsworthy SX748772
- Little Gnats' Head SX608764
- Little Fox Tor (or Yonder Tor) SX621698
- Little Hare Tor SX546841
- Little Hen Tor SX597656
- Little Holwell Tor SX750774
- Little Hound Tor SX632899
- Little Kes Tor SX632899
- Little King's Tor SX553739
- Little Kneeset SX585841
- Little Links Tor SX547870
- Little Longaford Tor SX615775
- Little Mis Tor SX564763 (Historically also called Wain Tor)
- Little Pew Tor SX531732
- Little Roos Tor SX548766
- Little Sharp Tor SX685731
- Little Staple Tor SX539754
- Little Tor SX589906
- Little Trowlesworthy Tor SX580645
- Little White Tor SX614786
- Lizwell Rock SX712736
- Logwell Rock SX710734
- Longaford Tor SX616779
- Longash Tor or just Longash SX551744
- Longstone Hill SX567910
- Longtimber Tor SX509783
- Lover's Leap SX726722 Next to Landscore Tor.
- Low Man Tor (Low Man or Lowman Crag; part of Haytor Rocks) SX757770
- Lower Arms Tor SX541868
- Lower Leather Tor SX562698
- Lower Leighon Tor SX758790
- Lower Logwell SX710735
- Lower Tor SX611916
- Lowery Tor SX556679
- Lowton Rocks SX667835
- Lower Dunnagoat Tor SX558863
- Lower White Tor SX619792
- Luckey Tor SX685721
- Luxton Tor SX558632
- Lydford Tor SX599782
- Lynch Tor SX565807
- Maiden Hill
- Maiden Tor SX561861
- Manaton Rocks SX748815
- Manga Hill SX630850
- Manga Rock SX636857
- Mardon Down SX769878
- Mel Tor SX693725
- Meldon Hill (Includes Tunnaford Rocks)
- Metheral Hill SX624897
- Merripit Hill SX657803
- Mid Tor
- Middle Staple Tor SX540757
- Middle Tor SX565807
- Middleworth Tor SX571692
- Mill Bottom SX786809
- Mis Tors See Great Mis and Little Mis Tors

== N–R ==
- Naker's Hill SX633688
- Narrator SX566683
- Narrow Tor
- Nattadon Common SX705866
- Nat Tor (2)
  - Burrator Reservoir SX573673
  - Nat Tor, Lydford SX545825
- North Hessary Tor SX578743
- North Tor (or part of Bench Tor as collective of outcrops) SX690719
- Oddy Tor (or Nympenhole and Viper Tor) SX766800
- Oke Tor SX612901
- Okement Hill (or Ockment) SX603875
- Old Hill SX664629
- Old House Rocks SX612900
- Over Tor SX557752
- Parson's Brown Loaf SX781817
- Pathfields (Outcrop) SX782814
- Peek Hill SX566699
- Pepperdon Down SX779852
- Penn Beacon SX599629
- Pew Tor SX532735
- Pil Tor SX735759
- Pin Tor SX756887
- Pinchaford Ball SX763764
- Pixey Copse Tor SX810804
- Pizwell Tor
- Plane Tor SX554780
- Pork Hill SX529751
- Prowtytown Rocks SX528745
- Prince Hall Rocks SX614740
- Puggiestone SX685876
- Puper's Hill SX673674
- Quickbeam Hill SX656647
- Rabbits Tor SX633698
- Raddick Hill SX576712
- Ramshorn Down SX792739
- Ramsley Hill SX652929
- Rattlebrook Hill SX555851
- Raven Rock (2)
  - Dart SX730715
  - Walkham SX485702
- Raven's Tor (2)
  - Lustleigh SX762819
  - Lydford Gorge SX504840
- Reedy Hill (on the border)
- Rippon Tor SX747756
- Riddon Ridge SX665768
- Rival Tor (Rippator, Rifle Tor) SX642881
- Rock Copse Tors SX815803
- Roborough Rock SX515672
- Rook Tor SX602615
- Roos Tor (Roose Tor, Rulestorre, Rolls Tor) SX543766
- Rouge Tor SX542738
- Rough Tor (2)
  - N of Two Bridges SX606798
  - Burrator Reservoir SX574685
- Round Hill (3)
- Round Hill Tor SX605740
- Rowden Tor SX699758
- Row Tor (Rowtor) SX593916
- Rowdon Rock SX812860
- Royal Hill SX616726
- Royal Tor SX618726
- Rugglestone Rock SX723764
- Rundlestone Tor SX576746
- Ryder's Hill SX659691
- Ryder's Rocks SX677647

== S ==
- Saddlesborough (cairn) SX558632
- Saddle Rock SX541743
- Saddle Tor SX751763
- Sampford Tor SX532731
- Sandy Hole Rocks SX622813
- Scarey Tor SX607924
- Scatter Rock SX820855
- Scobetor (Scobitor) SX724749
- Scorhill Tor SX659872
- Set Tor
- Setters Tor SX531779
- Shadyback Tor SX566650
- Shapley Tor SX699821
- Shaptor Rock, Bovey Tracey SX810809
- Shaptor Woods (Outcrops) SX811802
- Sharp Tor (6).
  - Dartmeet SX686729
  - Lydford SX550848
  - Peter Tavy SX524770
  - Tavy Cleave SX553834
  - Ugborough Moor SX649617
  - Widecombe SX728780
- Sharpitor (also Sharp Tor) (2)
  - Leather Tor SX560702
  - Lustleigh SX772816
- Shaugh Beacon SX542634
- Shavercombe Tor SX594661
- Sheeps Tor SX566683
- Shell Top (or Shiel Top, Shell Tor) SX598638
- Shelstone Tor SX558898
- Shilstone Tor SX658902
- Shipley Tor SX685632
- Shovel Stone SX733763
- Sittaford Tor (or Siddaford Tor) SX633830
- Skir Hill SX650705
- Smeardon Down Tors SX522781
- Snappers Tor SX573693
- Snowdon SX668684
- Sonny Copse Tor SX810806
- Sourton Tors SX542899
- Southcott Rocks SX744800
- South Hessary Tor SX597724
- Smith Hill SX631758
- Smallacombe Rocks SX755782
- Standon Hill SX555814
- Stannon Tor SX647802
- Staple Tors or Steeple Tor - see Little Staple Tor, Middle Staple Tor and Great Staple Tor.
- Steeperton Tor SX618888
- Stenga Tor SX570880
- Stinger's Hill SX631660
- Stone Tor
- Stonetor Hill SX749856
- Stonelands Rocks SX815798
- Stoneslade Tor SX712779
- Stonelands Waste (The Grotto) SX818799
- Strane Tor SX611718
- Swell Tor SX560733. Quarried out.

== T–Z ==
- Tavy Cleave Tor or Cleeve SX553830
- Ter Hill SX642705
- The Nutcracker (Nutcracker's) SX743753
- The Thirlstone (Thirlstone/Thurlstone) SX628868
- Three Barrows SX653626
- Thornworthy Tor SX664853
- Tipleyhill SX797761
- Tom's Hill SX646834
- Top Tor SX737762
- Thornworthy Tor SX664851
- Town Wood Crags SX717732
- Tor Rocks SX641590
- Tors End Tor SX614925
- Trenchford Rocks
- Trendlebere Down Tors SX768801
- Tristis Rock SX638601
- Tunnaford Rocks (On the slopes of Meldon Hill.)
- Tunhill Rocks SX731757
- Udal Tor
- Ugborough Beacon SX668592
- Ugborough Moor (Tors and Cairns)
- Vag Hill SX676723
- Vixen Tor SX542742
- Wacka Tor SX662621
- Was Tor SX500830
- Watchet Hill SX615930
- Water Hill SX671813
- Water Rock SX766808
- Watern Tor (or Watern Borough) SX629868
- Weatherdon Hill SX651589
- Webburn Gap SX716731
- Webburn Rock SX715734
- Wedlake Tor SX537778
- West Down Piles SX538634
- Western White Barrow SX654576
- Welstor Rock or Well's Tor (Higher and lower outcrops) SX737729
- Western Beacon . The most southerly hill on Dartmoor. SX654575
- West Mill Tor SX587910
- White Hill
- White Ridge SX646817
- White Ridge Tor
- White Tor SX543788. See also Higher White Tor and Lower White Tor
- Whitehill Tor SX575615
- Whitehorse Hill SX617855
- Whittenknowles Rocks SX585671
- Whooping Rock SX729822
- Wild Tor SX623877
- Willingstone Rock SX753887
- Wind Tor SX708758
- Winter Tor SX609915
- Wittaburrow SX733752
- Woodcock Hill SX558876
- Wooder Goyle Rocks SX715778
- Yannadon Crags
- Yar Tor (Yartor) SX678741
- Yealm Rocks SX580901
- Yennadon Down SX546683
- Yes Tor (2)
  - Yes Tor (the better-known one, near Okehampton SX581902, which has also been known as Eastor and Highest Tor in the past
  - Walkhampton Common (or East Tor) Called East Tor by Terry Bound, referred to Crossing. Not on the OS map and quite difficult to find: SX563725
- Zeal Hill SX675634

== List of prominent summits ==
The following summits within the National Park have at least 30 metres prominence. Every summit over 300 metres lies within the park boundaries, with the highest top outside them being Livaton Hill (296.2 m, SX 67614 93001).

1. High Willhays (622 m)
2. Hangingstone Hill (604.6 m)
3. Cut Hill (603.8 m)
4. Great Links Tor (589 m)
5. Amicombe Hill (585.8 m)
6. Cosdon Hill (550.5 m)
7. Great Mis Tor (538 m)
8. Hamel Down (532 m)
9. Steeperton Tor (532 m)
10. Higher White Tor (525 m)
11. North Hessary Tor (517 m)
12. Ryder's Hill (515 m)
13. Beardown Tors (513 m)
14. White Ridge (505.7 m)
15. Assycombe Hill (498.6 m)
16. Penn Moor (493 m)
17. Birch Tor (488.8 m)
18. Quickbeam Hill (480.9 m)
19. Belstone Tor (479 m)
20. Rippon Tor (476 m)
21. White Tor (468.9 m)
22. Challacombe Down (463 m)
23. Ugborough Moor (461.3 m)
24. Chinkwell Tor (460 m)
25. Haytor Rocks (457 m)
26. Great Staple Tor (455.2 m)
27. Roos Tor (454.1 m)
28. South Hessary Tor (454.1 m)
29. Bellever Tor (444.1 m)
30. Cox Tor (442 m)
31. Easdon Tor (439 m)
32. Corndon Tor (434 m)
33. Top Tor (432 m)
34. Laughter Tor (421 m)
35. Black Hill (414.3 m)
36. Heatree Down (414 m)
37. Stalldown Barrow (413.6 m)
38. Sharpitor (412 m)
39. Hayne Down (397 m)
40. Leeden Tor (393.3 m)
41. Meldon Hill (391 m)
42. Riddon Ridge (380 m)
43. Sharp Tor (380 m)
44. Ugborough Beacon (378 m)
45. Sheeps Tor (369 m)
46. Mardon Down (357.1 m)
47. Blackingstone Rock (355 m)
48. Gibbet Hill (353 m)
49. Pepperdon Down (353 m)
50. Butterdon Hill (351 m)
51. Gutter Tor (350.6 m)
52. Mardon Down East Top (349 m)
53. Uppacott Down (337 m)
54. Brent Tor (334 m)
55. Nattadon Common (333 m)
56. Hunter's Tor (326 m)
57. Ausewell Rocks (325 m)
58. Heltor Rock (322 m)
59. Laployd Plantation (319.8 m)
60. Beara Common (311 m)
61. Gisperdown (302 m)
62. Sloncombe Hill (276 m)
63. Wigford Down (273 m)
64. Wastor Hill (272.3 m)
65. Piddledown Common (268 m)
66. Shaptor Rock (268 m)
67. Way Down (267 m)
68. Prestonbury Castle (249 m)
69. Broadmoor Common (247 m)
70. Ashburton Down (241 m)
71. Green Down (235 m)
72. Hanger Down (233 m)
73. Mapstone Hill (221 m)
74. Ramshorn Down (204 m)
75. Bowdown Cross (196 m)
76. Holeland Hill (195.9 m)
77. Holne Chase (195.4 m)
78. Dunsford Wood Hill (189.3 m)
79. Slade Copse (175 m)
80. Ashburton Hill (161 m)
81. Hawson Court (154 m)
82. Penn Wood (144 m)
83. Terrace Walk Hill (144 m)
84. Summerhill (133 m)

== Notes ==
The total number of named tors and hills on the moor varies considerably depending on the source. Crossing refers to tors as "These granite masses, of which there are about 170 on Dartmoor". There are at least as many named Hills, Downs, Beacons etc. as well as Rocks used to refer to tors. It is not uncommon for a tor and a hill to share a name, as Tor refers to the granite outcrop (for example Nattor Down), equally, as can be seen in the list above, many names recur. Even the definition of Dartmoor varies between sources, particularly between modern sources and those that predate the national park.

== References and further reading ==
- Tim Jenkinson, Max Piper & Paul Buck: Tors of Dartmoor Website (www.torsofdartmoor.co.uk) This searchable database of the tors of Dartmoor National Park is the most definitive list available of both lesser and well known tors and rocks.
- Terry Bound: The A to Z of Dartmoor Tors (Obelisk Publications)
- Max Piper: East Dartmoor's Lesser-Known Tors and Rocks (The Dartmoor Company)
