= List of hills of Devon =

This is a list of hills in Devon. Many of these peaks are important historical, archaeological and nature conservation sites, as well as popular hiking and tourist destinations in the county of Devon in southwest England.

== Colour key ==
Class	Prominence
Marilyns	150 – 599 m
HuMPs	100 – 149 m
TuMPs	30 – 99 m
Unclassified	0 – 29 m

The table is colour-coded based on the classification or "listing" of the mountain or hill. The types that occur in Devon are Marilyns, HuMPs and TuMPs, listings based on topographical prominence. "Prominence" correlates strongly with the subjective significance of a summit. Peaks with low prominences are either subsidiary tops of a higher summit or relatively insignificant independent summits. Peaks with high prominences tend to be the highest points around and likely to have extraordinary views.

A Marilyn is a hill with a prominence of at least 150 metres or about 500 feet. A "HuMP" (the acronym comes from "Hundred Metre Prominence) is a hill with a prominence of at least 100 but less than 150 metres. In this table Marilyns are in beige and HuMPs in lilac. A "TuMP" as defined here is a hill with a prominence of at least 30 but less than 100 metres. The term "sub-Marilyn" or "sub-HuMP" is used, e.g. in the online Database of British and Irish Hills to indicate hills that fall just below the threshold. To qualify for inclusion, hills must either be 400 metres or higher with a prominence of at least 30 metres, below 400 metres with a prominence of at least 90 metres (the threshold for a sub-HuMP) or be in some other way notable.

For further information see the Lists of mountains and hills in the British Isles and the individual articles on Marilyns, HuMPs, and TuMPs; by way of contrast, see also the article listing Tumps (a traditional term meaning a hillock, mound, barrow or tumulus).

== List of mountains and hills ==
In the UK and Ireland, a mountain is usually taken to be at least 2,000 feet high. By that definition, Devon has two mountains: High Willhays and Yes Tor.

Hill	Height (m)	Prom. (m)	Grid ref.	Class	Parent	Range/Region	Remarks	Image
High Willhays	621	537	SX580892	Marilyn, Simm, Hewitt, Nuttall, HuMP, TuMP, Devon county top (historical and current)	High Street	Dartmoor	Devon's county top. Highest point of Dartmoor. Large cairn on rock tor at summit. Mountain.	
Yes Tor	619	24	SX580901	Sub-Simm, Nuttall, Buxton & Lewis	High Willhays	Dartmoor	Second highest point on Dartmoor. Trig point on rock tor at summit. Mountain.	
Cut Hill	603	90	SX598827	Simm, Dewey, Sub-HuMP, TuMP	High Willhays	Dartmoor	Joint third highest point in Devon. Grassy mound at summit.	
Hangingstone Hill	603	48	SX617861	Simm, Dewey, TuMP	High Willhays	Dartmoor	Joint third highest point in Devon. Small cairn on mound of grass and stones 10m N of stone hut.	
Great Links Tor	589	112	SX550867	HuMP, Dewey, TuMP	High Willhays	Dartmoor	Rock by trig point.	
Amicombe Hill (Kitty Tor)	585	36	SX566872	Dewey, TuMP	High Willhays	Dartmoor	Rock tor by flagpole.	
Black Hill (North-West Dartmoor)	584	23	SX604846	Sub-Dewey	High Willhays	Dartmoor	Small cairn on flat summit area.	
Cosdon Hill	550	82	SX636915	Dewey, TuMP	High Willhays	Dartmoor	Summit at rim of hollow 8m NW of trig point.	
Brown's House Top	539	27	SX614804	Sub-Dewey	High Willhays	Dartmoor	Flat, grassy summit.	
Great Mis Tor	538	81	SX562769	Dewey, TuMP	High Willhays	Dartmoor	Summit marked by rock next to range warning flagpole on rock tor.	
Sittaford Tor	538	22	SX633830	sub-Dewey	High Willhays	Dartmoor	Grassy mound at summit.	
Hameldown, Hamel Down	532	97	SX705799	Dewey, sub-HuMP, TuMP	High Willhays	Dartmoor	Summit is on rim of hollowed tumulus 8m from modern stone sign. Trig point, 700m away, is 2m lower.	
Steeperton Tor	532	31	SX618887	Dewey, TuMP	High Willhays	Dartmoor	Summit on top of rock tor.	
Hare Tor	531	26	SX550842	Sub-Dewey	High Willhays	Dartmoor	Summit on ground by concreted iron ring about 2m from flagpole.	
Higher White Tor	527	49	SX619785	Dewey, TuMP	High Willhays	Dartmoor	Summit cairn.	
North Hessary Tor	517	63	SX578742	Dewey, TuMP	High Willhays	Dartmoor	Trig point at summit on rock tor.	
Ryder's Hill	515	109	SX659690	Dewey, HuMP, TuMP	High Willhays	Dartmoor	Summit on embedded rock 2 m from trig point.	
Beardown Tors	513	32	SX602773	Dewey, TuMP	High Willhays	Dartmoor	Summit at SE top of W rock tor.	
East Mill Tor	513	26	SX599898	Sub-Dewey	High Willhays	Dartmoor	Flat rock slab summit.	
White Ridge	506	50	SX648821	Dewey, TuMP	High Willhays	Dartmoor	Featureless summit.	
Assycombe Hill	497	56	SX665820	TuMP	High Willhays	Dartmoor	Edge of Fernworthy Forest. Stone rows and other signs of ancient settlement.	
Hookney Tor	497	22	SX699813	Unclassified	High Willhays	Dartmoor	On the Two Moors Way.	
Hound Tor	495	20	SS732368	Unclassified	High Willhays	Dartmoor	Tor close to track between Hangingstone Hill and Cosdon Hill	
Five Barrows Hill	493	81	SX628890	TuMP	Dunkery Beacon	Exmoor	Summit is 2m N of trig point on tumulus	
Penn Moor	493	41	SX602645	TuMP	High Willhays	Dartmoor	Summit about 100m NNE of trig point.	
Birch Tor	487	35	SX686815	TuMP	High Willhays	Dartmoor	Tor on open moorland. Two Moors Way runs past the summit aboutg 300m to the N. Extensive signs of ancient settlement, including tumulus, stone row, disused mine and Bennett's Cross	
Quickbeam Hill	481	35	SX653654	TuMP	High Willhays	Dartmoor	Open summit with tumulus and Petre's Cross Two Moors Way circles the summit from SW to NE; a track branches off to the summit. Extensive signs of ancient settlement, including cairn circle, barrows, crosses and a "blowing house"	
Belstone Tor	479	47	SX614920	TuMP	High Willhays	Dartmoor	Tor on open moorland summit surrounded by crags Irishman's Wall runs past about 100m to the south; a N-S track passes the summit about 400m to the W. Extensive signs of ancient settlement in the area, including Nine Stones.	
Rippon Tor	476	118	SX746755	HuMP	High Willhays	Dartmoor	Summit is the slab of rock 4m ENE of trig point Car park on B3387 about 600 m N of the summit. Track to the summit from junction of B road and minor road about 500 m NW of summit. Cairns and logan stone near the top.	
Shoulsbarrow Common	476	118	SS709392	TuMP	Dunkery Beacon	Exmoor	Summit at fence junction A hillfort, Shoulsbury Castle lies on the western slopes of the hill There is a trig point about 250 m SW of the summit.	

== See also ==
- List of mountains and hills of the United Kingdom
- List of Marilyns in England

== Notes ==
1. Parts of Dartmoor are military training areas which means the peaks in these areas are only accessible to the public at certain times.
2. The following summit(s) have been omitted from the table as they are sub-peaks, as per the UIAA definition or alternative names of hills in the main list:

- Whitehorse Hill (601m), Dartmoor, subpeak of Hangingstone Hill 600 m to the N.
