= Rattle Brook =

Brook in Dartmoor, Devon, England

Coordinates: 50.794°N 4.022°W

Rattle Brook is a brook in north Dartmoor in Devon in south-west England. It is situated East of Great Links Tor, and rises by the Rattlebrook Peatworks on remote moorland in the western section of Dartmoor National Park. It flows past Bleak House with Green Tor to the east and Higher and Lower Dunna Goat Tors to the west. It runs between Amicombe Hill and Rattlebrook Hill to join the River Tavy at the mouth of Tavy Cleave.

== Usage today ==
Recreational walkers tend to stay west of Rattle Brook with the series of scenic tors stretching from Great Links Tor to Hare Tor to Tavy Cleave Tors and Ger Tor. This is largely due to the high amounts of bog, mud, and thick grass to the East of Rattle Brook in the moor East of Rattle Brook.

== RattleBrook Peatworks ==
The Rattlebrook Peatworks was a railway established in the Rattle Brook valley for the Duchy of Cornwall to facilitate the transportation of goods and trade. Constructed in 1879 in the era of horse-drawn carriage transportation, the line was operated for almost all of its life by horse. The line featured only one passing place, just over half way along the line from Bridestowe where the line reversed direction.

At its peak, the line was seven miles long, and in that distance rose 1000 ft in elevation. Only by the early 20th century did more modern railcars become adopted in the area, when the first petrol powered lorry was converted to run on rails in Okehampton.

The line was discontinued in 1932, with its final job being to remove all the metal as scrap from Rattlebrook and lift the rails.
