= Rippon Tor =

Granite tor on Dartmoor in Devon, England

Coordinates: 50.565°N 3.772°W

Rippon Tor is a striking tor on eastern Dartmoor, in England, that stands at 473 metres (1,552 ft) above sea level. It has three cairns, of which are some of Dartmoor's largest, a triangulation pillar, and several rock piles that overlook the northern high moors near Fernworthy Forest and Great Mis Tor. Field boundaries surround the tor.

The views extend down to North Hessary Tor around Princetown and Holne Ridge. On most days the River Teign is visible with the sea at Teignmouth. The clay pits in between Kingsteignton and Bovey Tracey are also usually visible. Most of the other eastern tors can be seen, such as popular Haytor and Saddle Tor. The logan stone known as the Nutcracker is nearby. The tor can be accessed from the Hemsworthy Gate Car Park by the B3387 from Widecombe-in-the-Moor to Bovey Tracey.

Rippon Tor Rifle Range lies nearby on Horridge Common and the tor is close to the source of the River Ashburn, a tributary of the River Dart.
