= Holne Ridge =

Geographic feature in Dartmoor, England

Coordinates: 50.513°N 3.882°W

Holne Ridge, on Dartmoor, includes some of southern Dartmoor's highest land. The ridge to the south west overlooks mires and bogs like Aune Head Mires. To the north east it overlooks the Dart Gorge with its many tors; Sharp Tor, for example. It also includes many notable features including:

- Ryder's Hill - Highest point on southern Dartmoor and includes Petre's Bound Stone and a trig Point on a small cairn
- Horn's Cross - Ancient Cross
- Puper's Hill - Cairns
- Venford Reservoir - Reservoir supplying water to the Paignton area of south Devon
- O Brook - Short tributary of the River Dart
- Snowdon - Cairns
- Sandy Way - Ancient track
- Holne Lee - Cairns
- Wheal Emma Leat - Dry leat that used to supply water to copper mines near Buckfastleigh
- Holne Moor Leat - Or Hamlyn's Leat. Used to supply water to a woollen mill near Buckfastleigh
