= Bellever =

Hamlet in Devon, England

Coordinates: 50.581°N 03.901°W

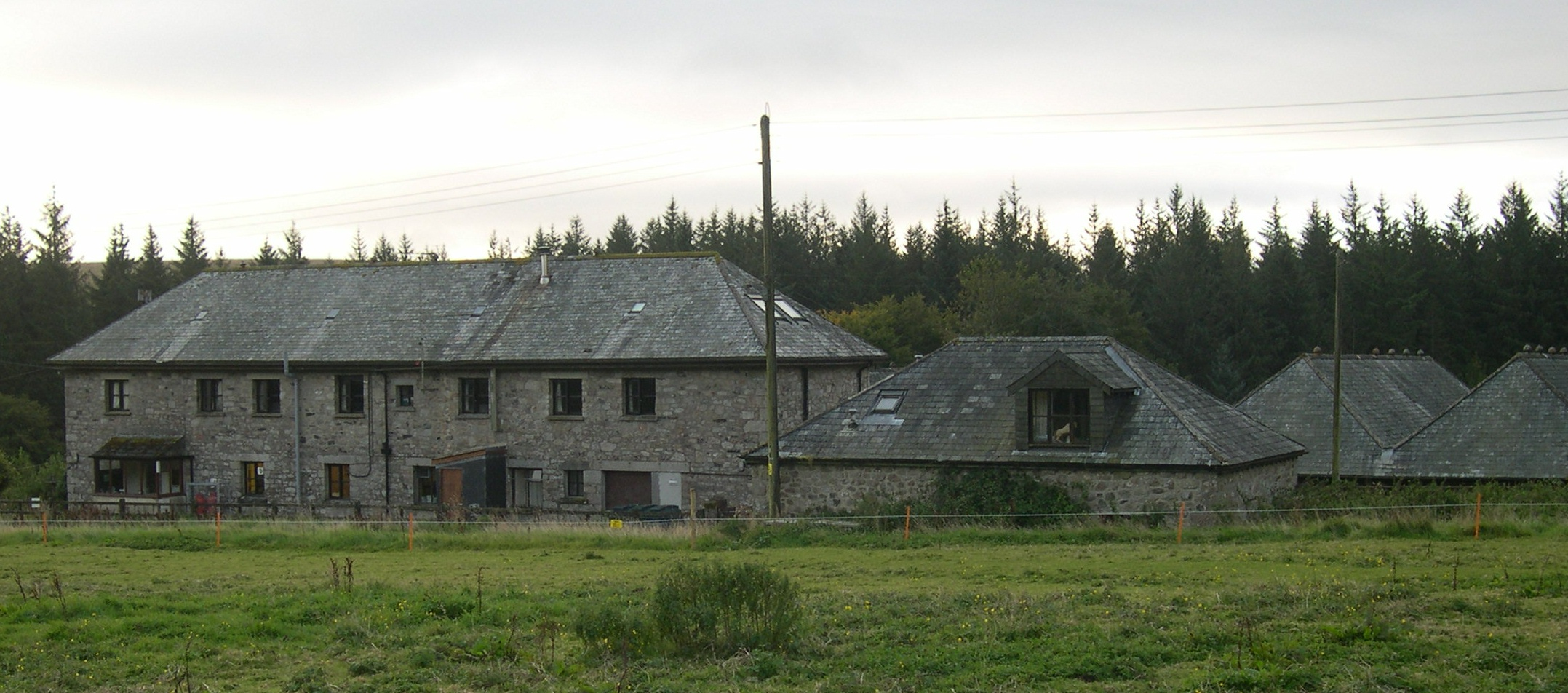
- Bellever Youth Hostel

- Location within Devon
- OS grid reference: SX6577
- District: West Devon
- Shire county: Devon
- Region: South West
- Country: England
- Sovereign state: United Kingdom
- Post town: YELVERTON
- Postcode district: PL20
- Dialling code: 01822
- Police: Devon and Cornwall
- Fire: Devon and Somerset
- Ambulance: South Western
- UK Parliament: Torridge and West Devon

Bellever is a hamlet in Dartmoor, Devon, England. It is located on the river East Dart about 2 kilometres (1 mi) south of Postbridge.

The first mention of a settlement at this location is in a Duchy of Cornwall record from 1355 which gives the name of a farm here as Welford, a contraction of wielle (spring) and ford. However, in his High Dartmoor (1983), Eric Hemery proposed that the name comes from bal (mine) and ford, meaning the mine by the ford.

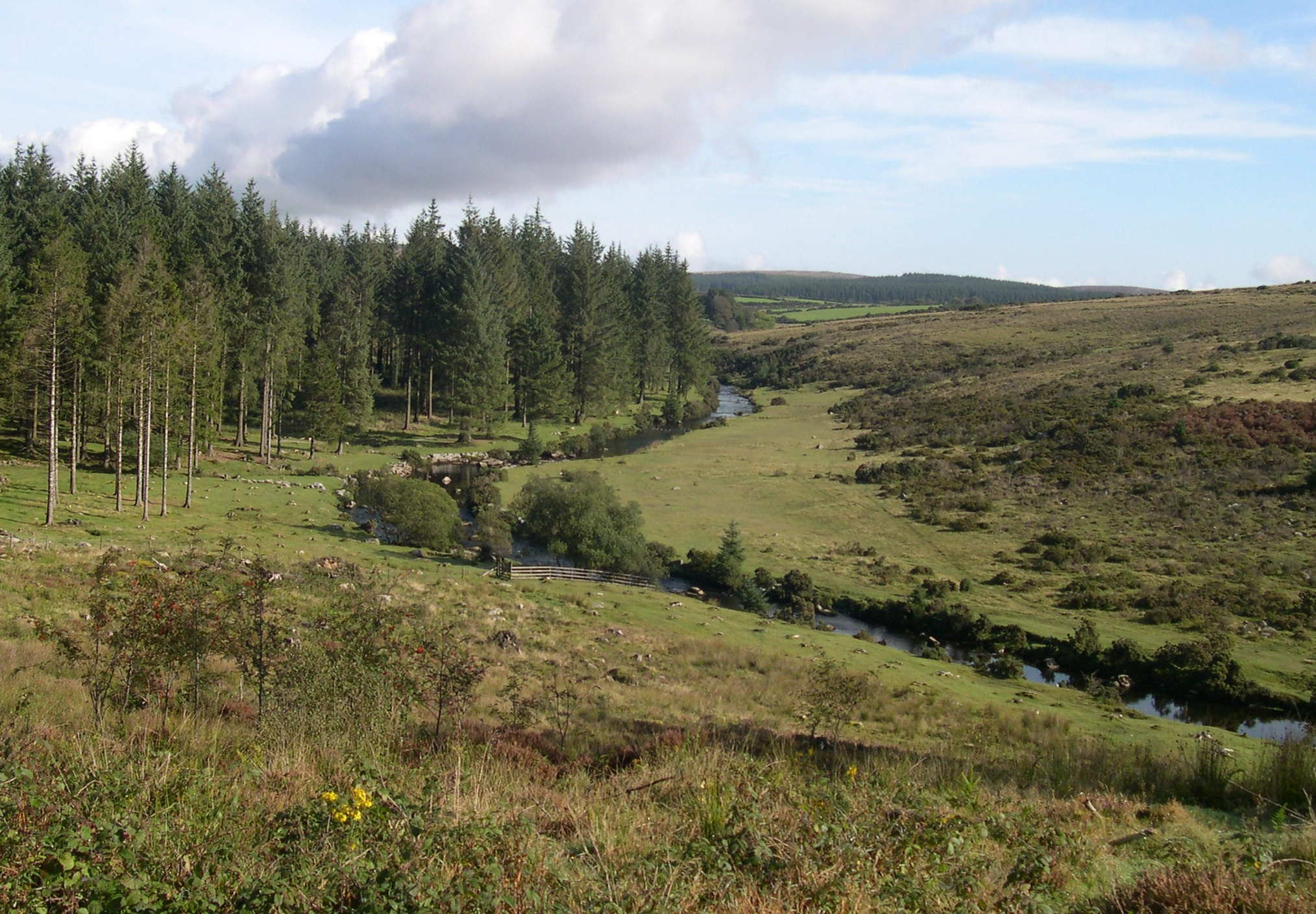
The River East Dart at Bellever

Until the period after World War II the hamlet consisted of Bellever Farm (owned by the Duchy of Cornwall) and its outbuildings, with a small number of cottages for the farm workers. The farm gained a reputation for the introduction of Galloway and Aberdeen Angus cattle onto Dartmoor. However, in 1931 the Forestry Commission, now Forestry England bought the farm and began a large planting scheme here; several houses were built in the 1950s to house the forestry workers. The coniferous plantation known as Bellever Forest surrounds the hamlet on its north, west and south sides.

In 1934 some of the barns of Bellever Farm were let to Youth Hostels Association (England & Wales) and now form the oldest, still functioning youth hostel in Devon.

As of 2019 the hamlet is served by a daily bus service that runs between Yelverton, Princetown, Postbridge and Tavistock. During the summer Forestry England run a small visitor centre by the East Dart river.

Bellever Tor lies 1.5 kilometres (1 mi) to the southwest.
