= Berra Tor =

Granite tor on Dartmoor in Devon, England

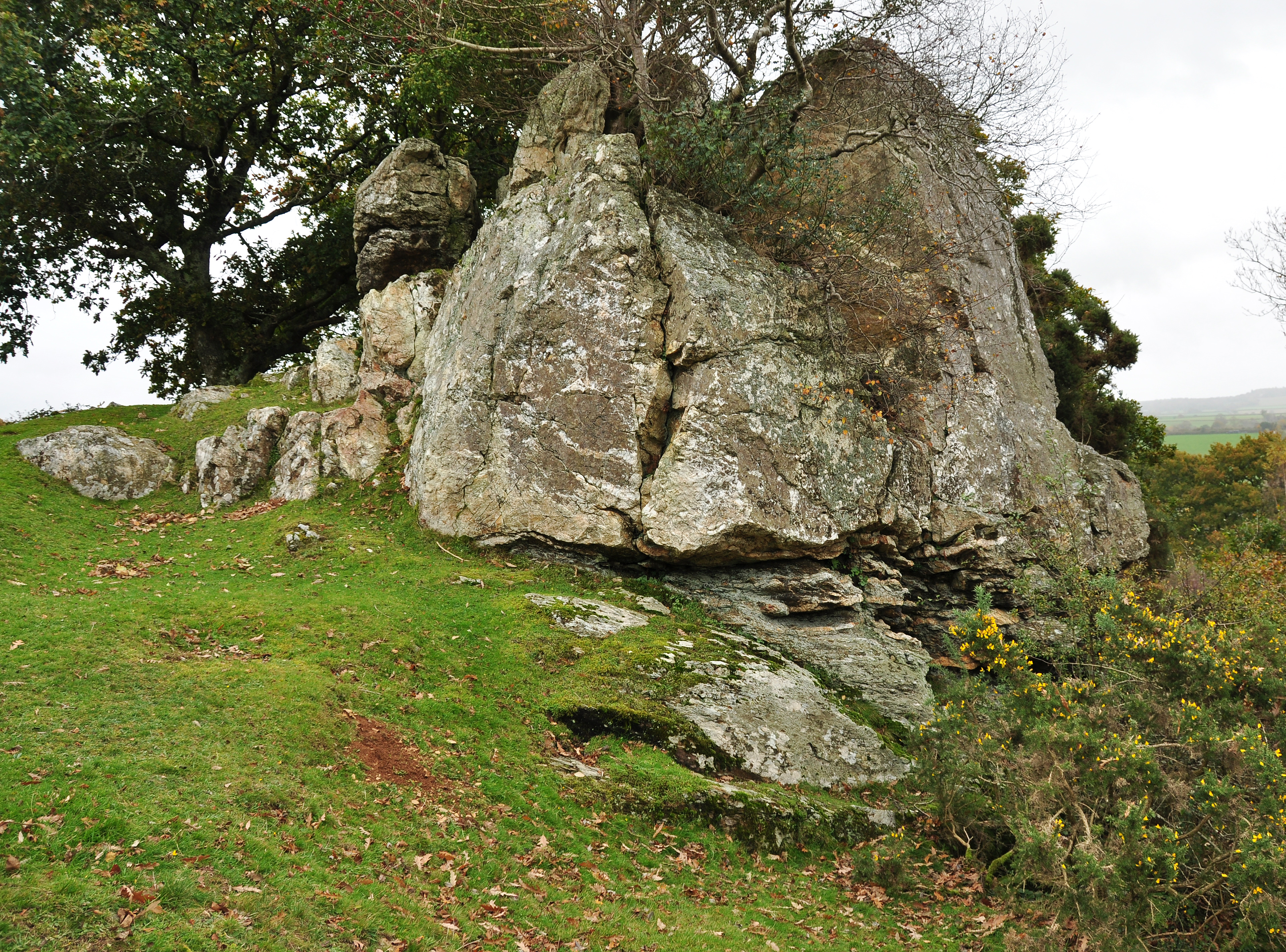
- Berra Tor.

Highest point
- Elevation: 132 m (433 ft)
- Coordinates: 50°30′20″N 4°08′55″W

Geography
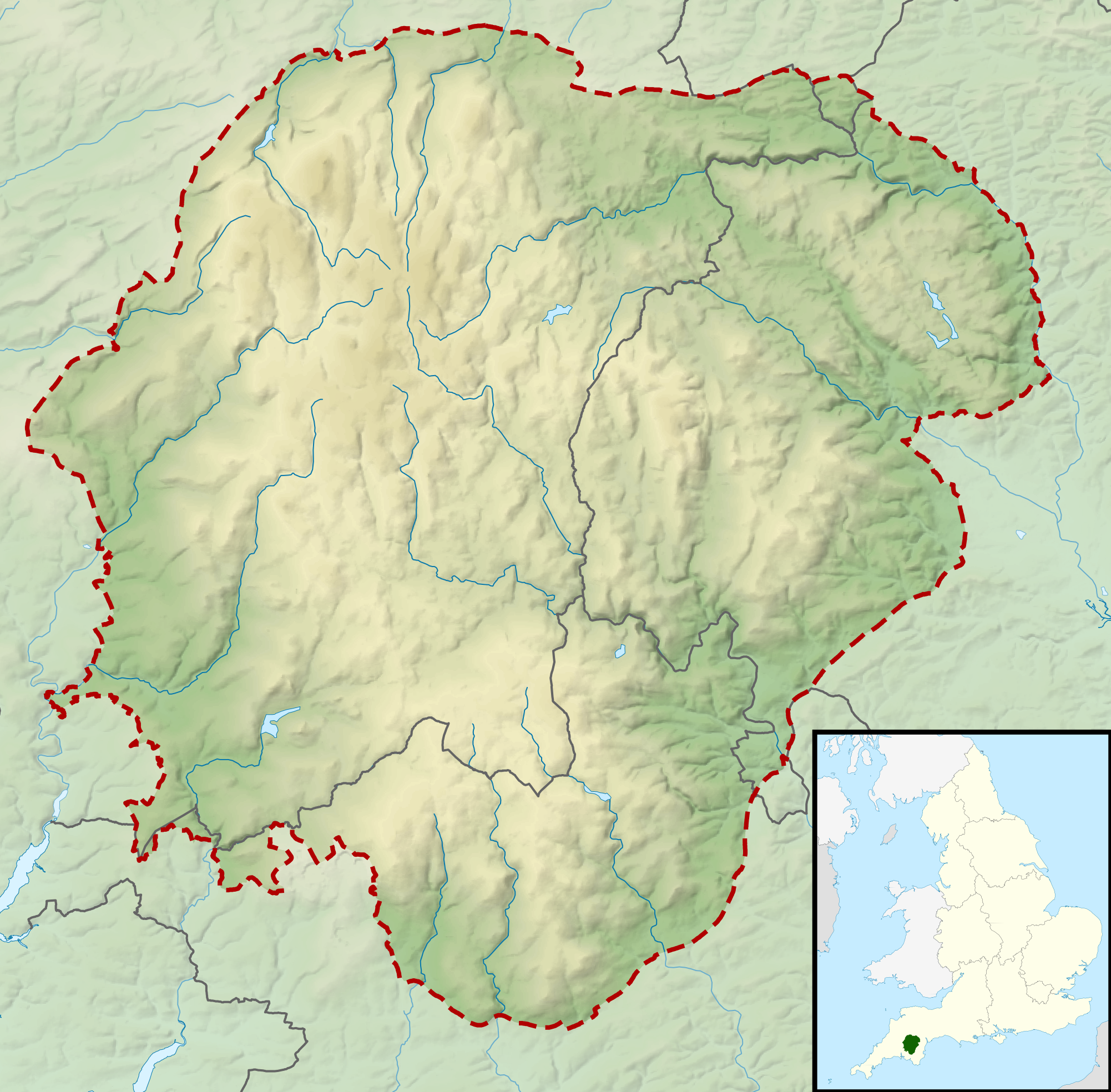
- Location within Dartmoor
- Location: Dartmoor, England
- OS grid: SX553679
- Topo map: OS Explorer OL28: Dartmoor

Climbing
- Easiest route: From Roborough Down

Berra Tor (grid reference SX553679) is a granite tor on the south western edge of Dartmoor. It is only 132 metres above sea level so is one of the lowest tors on Dartmoor. It is quite isolated and hidden from everywhere else and is generally quite unknown. It juts out of some trees and resembles more of a rock than an outcrop on a hill, like Great Mis Tor and Yes Tor that also provide views. Its nearest settlement of size is Buckland Monachorum.
