= Chinkwell Tor =

Granite tor on Dartmoor in Devon, England

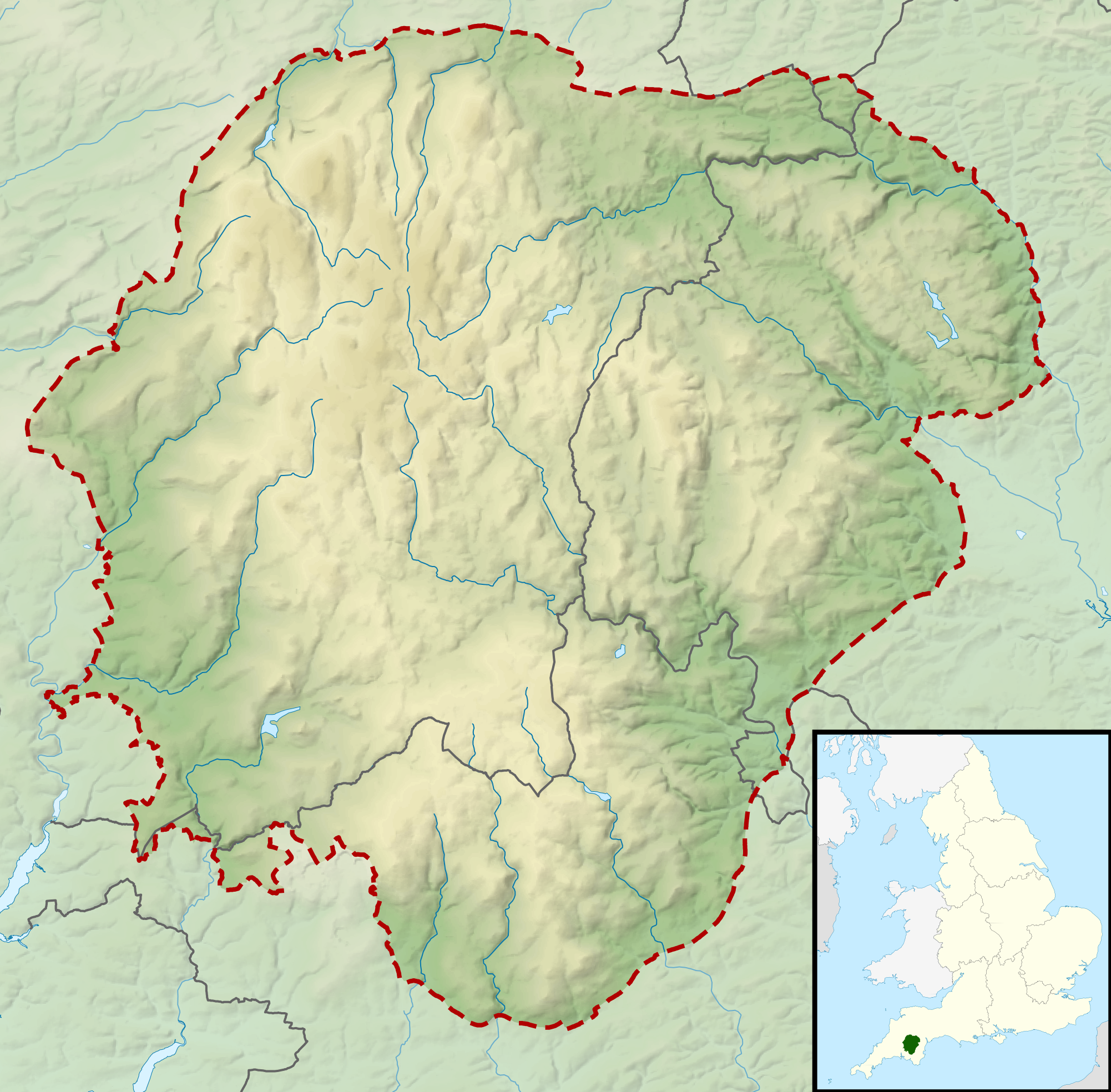
- Location within Dartmoor

Highest point
- Elevation: 458 m (1,503 ft)OS OL28
- Prominence: 78m
- Parent peak: unknown
- Listing: TuMP
- Coordinates: 50.5901°N 3.79624957°W

Geography
- Location: Dartmoor, England
- Parent range: Dartmoor
- OS grid: SX729781
- Topo map: OS Landrager 202

Climbing
- Easiest route: North from Bonehill Rocks

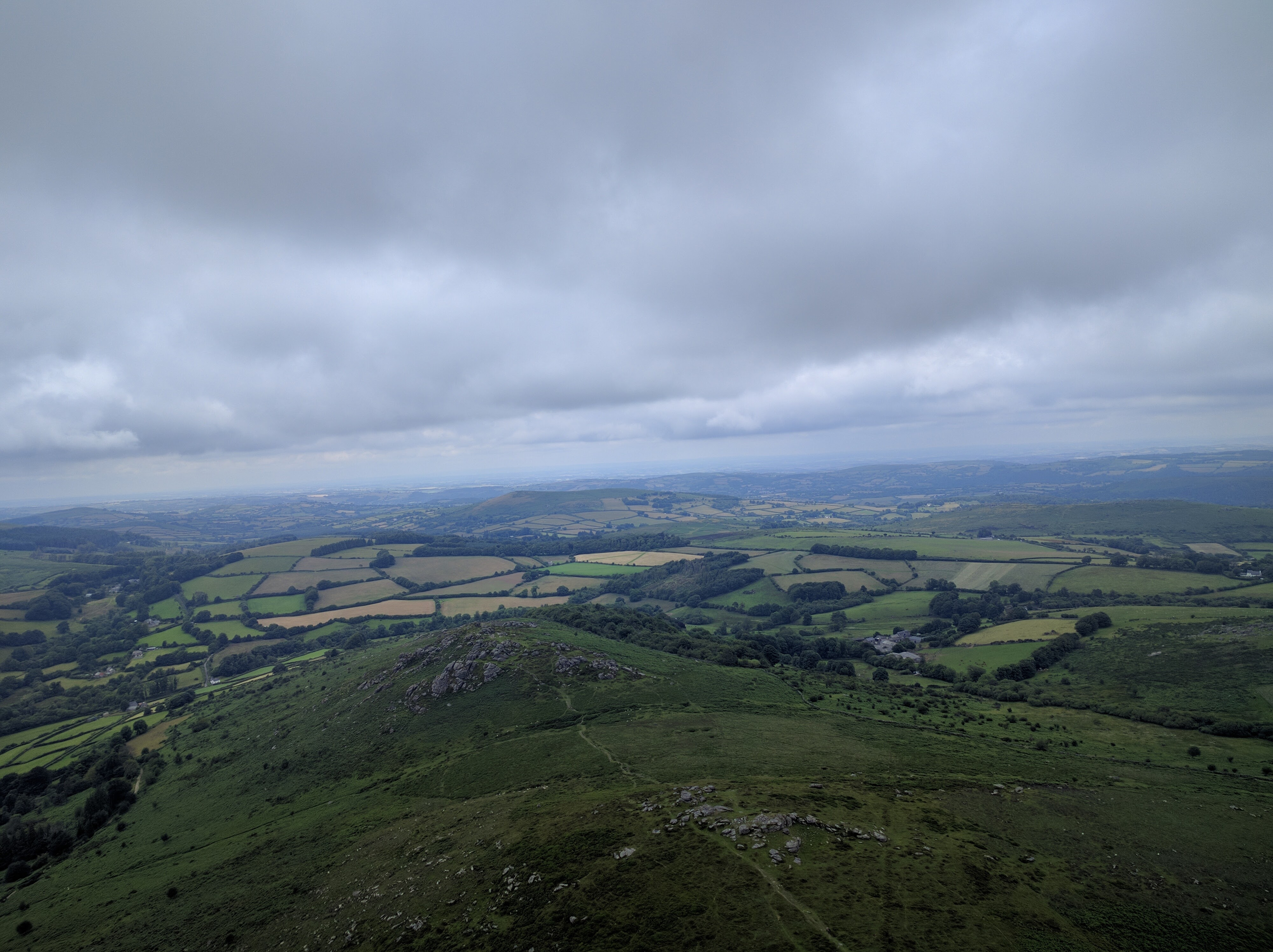
Chinkwell Tor cairn and Honeybag Tor behind

Chinkwell Tor is a granite tor on Dartmoor, England. It consists of two cairns at the summit which stand at 458 metres above sea level It is surrounded by other tors and features such as:

- Widecombe-in-the-Moor village
- Bell Tor
- Honeybag Tor
- Hameldown Tor
- Great Houndtor
- Bonehill Rocks
- Haytor and Lowman
- Saddle Tor
- Rippon Tor
