= Brat Tor =

Granite tor on Dartmoor in Devon, England

Coordinates: 50°39′06″N 4°04′03″W

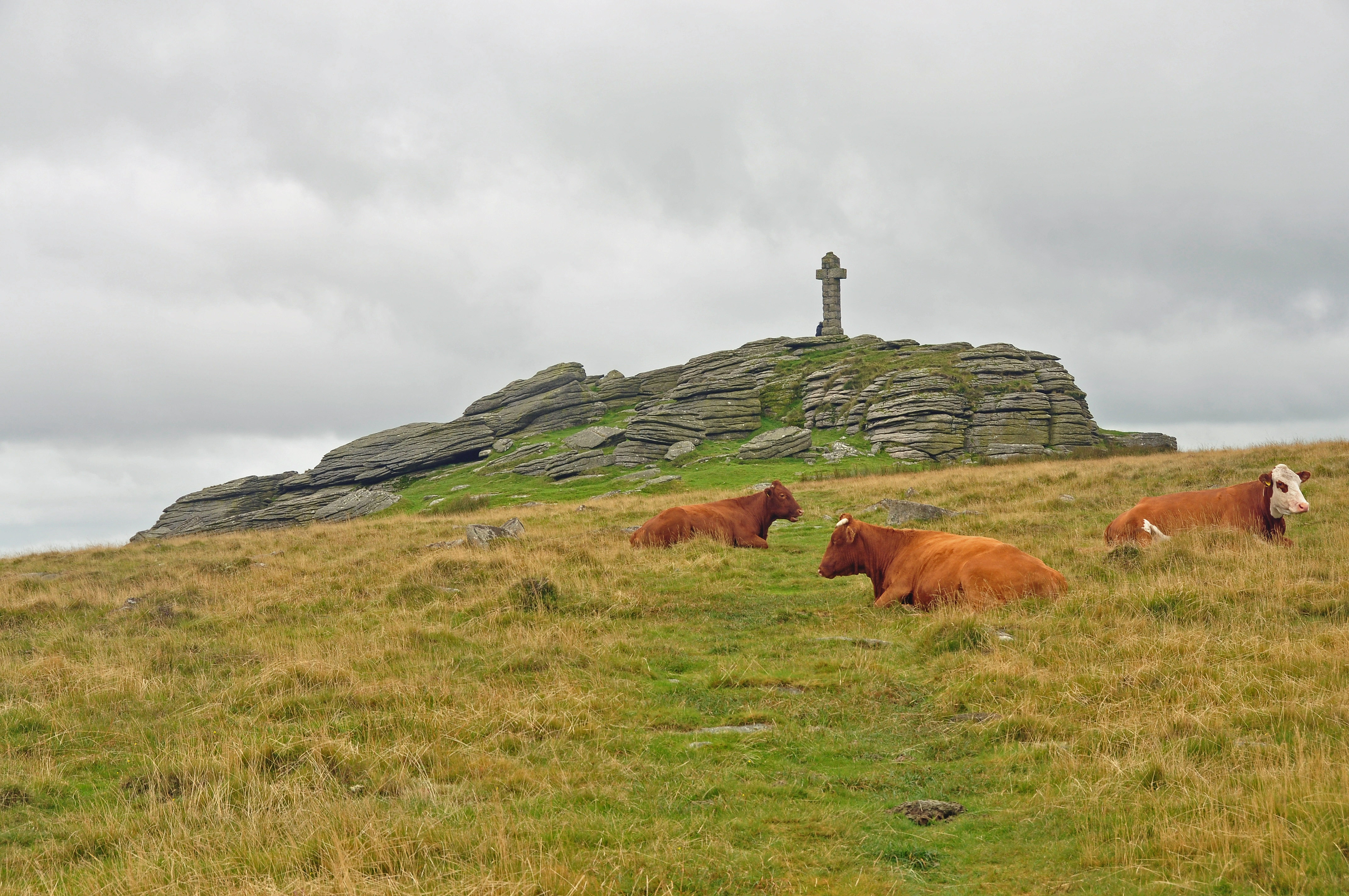
Brat Tor on the western edge of Dartmoor. Widgery Cross visible on the summit.

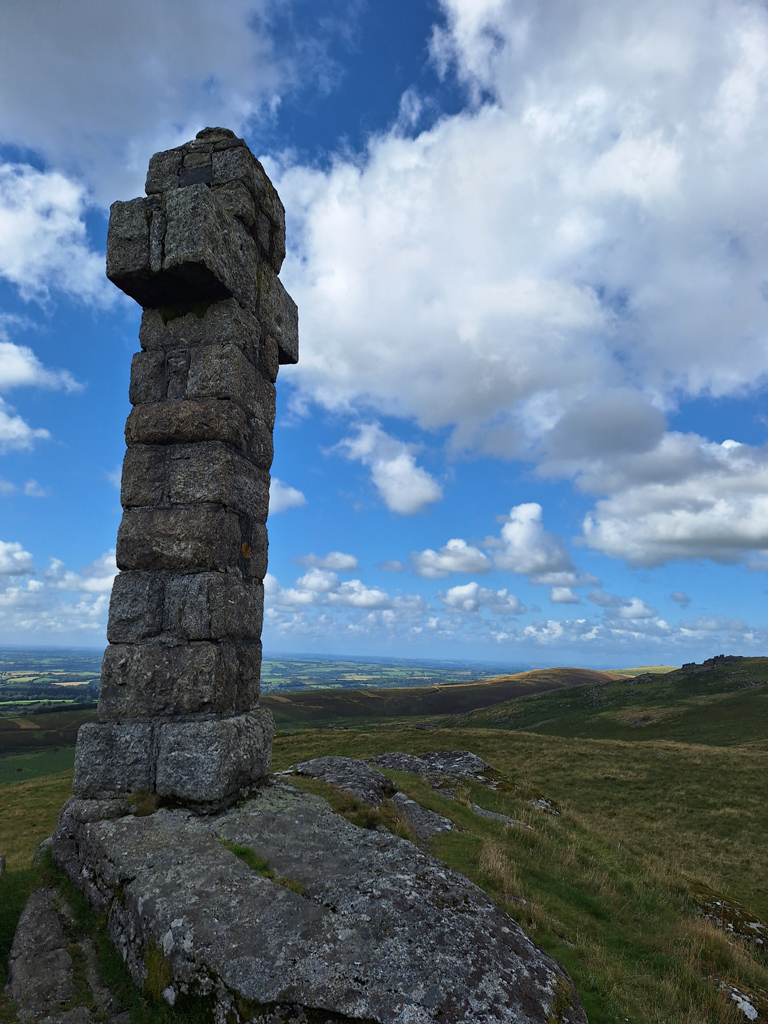
Widgery Cross on Brat Tor, Bridestowe

Brat Tor, also known as Brai Tor and Widgery Tor, is a dramatic granite tor on the western flank of Dartmoor, England. It is best known for Widgery Cross, the tallest Dartmoor cross, which stands on its summit. It is, however, not as grand as other neighbouring tors, such as the imposing Great Links Tor and Hare Tor. It stands at 454 metres above sea level.
