= Fur Tor =

Granite tor on Dartmoor in Devon, England

Fur Tor is a large and isolated granite tor situated in the remote northern part of Dartmoor, Devon, England.

Standing above the headwaters of the River Tavy, Fur Tor {UK National Grid reference 588831} is described by William Crossing as "perhaps the grandest of the Dartmoor tors, for while there are some that rise much higher above the ground than the loftiest of the piles here, and also exhibit finer rock masses, there is none that covers so large an area, or whose surroundings are of the desolate character as those upon which this lonely tor looks down."
