= Vixen Tor =

Granite tor on Dartmoor in Devon, England

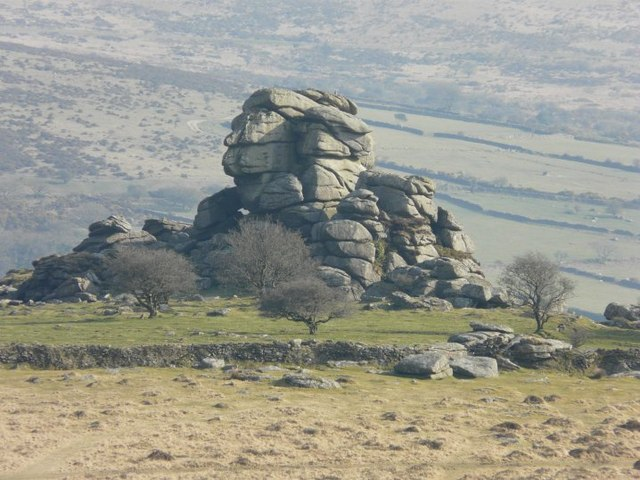
- Vixen Tor from the car park near Merrivale on Two Bridges to Tavistock road

Highest point
- Elevation: 300 m (980 ft)
- Coordinates: 50°32′59″N 4°03′33″W

Geography
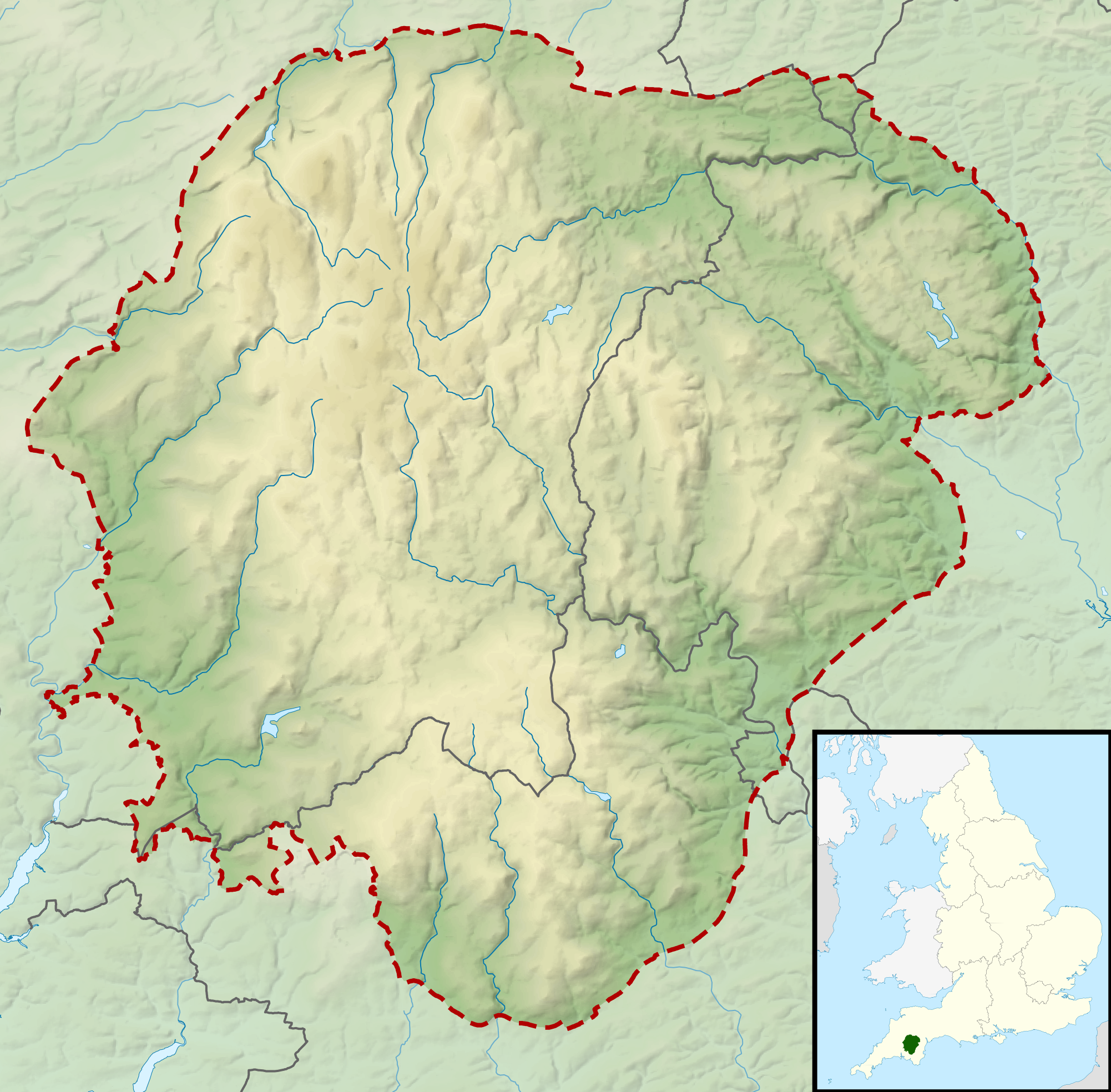
- Location within Dartmoor
- Location: Dartmoor, England
- Parent range: Dartmoor
- OS grid: SX542742

Vixen Tor is a tor on Dartmoor, England. The tor is on private land and since 2003 access by the public has been banned, causing protests and mass trespassing by hikers and climbers.

== The tor ==
The tor lies between Tavistock and Princetown on Dartmoor. There is a car park to the south of the B3357 road midway between Two Bridges and Tavistock. The tor is 0.5 miles (0.80 km) away.

The tor rises 120 feet (37 m) from the moor. The peak is 300 metres (980 ft) above sea level. It is a granite mass that appears to be made from rocks piled up on each other. The tor is the highest free-standing rock on Dartmoor. From some angles it is said to resemble the Sphinx. It has also been said to resemble a vixen and yet others say it looks like an old man with a cap on his head and his back to his wife. Although 27 rock climbing routes have been identified, all climbing and walking access is currently banned.

== Legend of Vixana ==
There is a legend that a witch named Vixana once lived in a cave at the foot of the tor that she had made the earth gnomes build for her. She was tall, bent and ugly. She delighted in calling up a mist to surround any traveller who passed the bog at the foot of the tor, so they would lose their way and be sucked down to their death. She met her fate when she tried to lure a handsome young man of the moor to his fate, but he had the power to see through the mist and to make himself invisible. He escaped and pushed the witch to her death on the rocks below the tor. Another version has the witch drowning in the bog into which she had lured so many people.

== Access controversy ==
The land containing the tor has been owned privately since around 1970. A new owner bought 360 acres (150 ha) of land around the tor in 2003, and at once closed all access to the landmark. She explained that her insurance company had told her she could be liable if walkers or climbers injured themselves on the tor. The Ramblers Association and British Mountaineering Council launched a campaign to publicise the issue, including a "mass trespass" of 20 people on 1 January 2004.

A court found in June 2004 that the owner had made changes to unimproved grassland without obtaining permission, and fined the owner. A public inquiry found in January 2005 that the land was in fact farmland, and the court ruling was overturned in May 2005. Other groups became involved and arranged further protests. Devon County Council claimed that paths leading to the tor were in free public use from 1956 to 1976, and on that basis were public rights of way and should be reopened. However, in September 2011, a planning inspector ruled that there was insufficient evidence of use over an unbroken twenty-year period.
