= Pil Tor =

Granite tor on Dartmoor in Devon, England

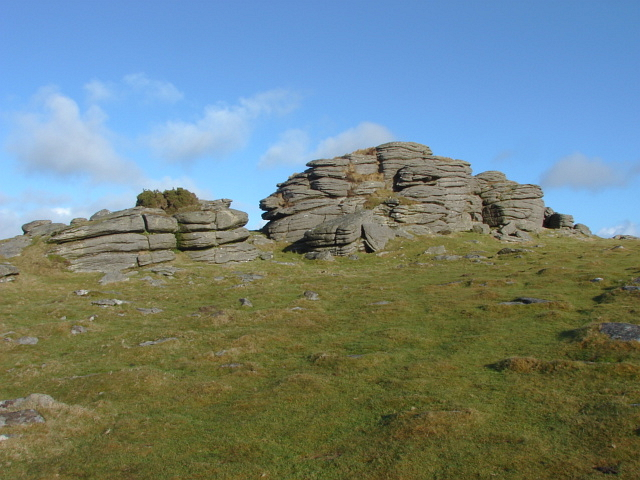

Highest point
- Elevation: 420 m (1,380 ft)
- Coordinates: 50°34′11″N 3°47′15″W

Geography
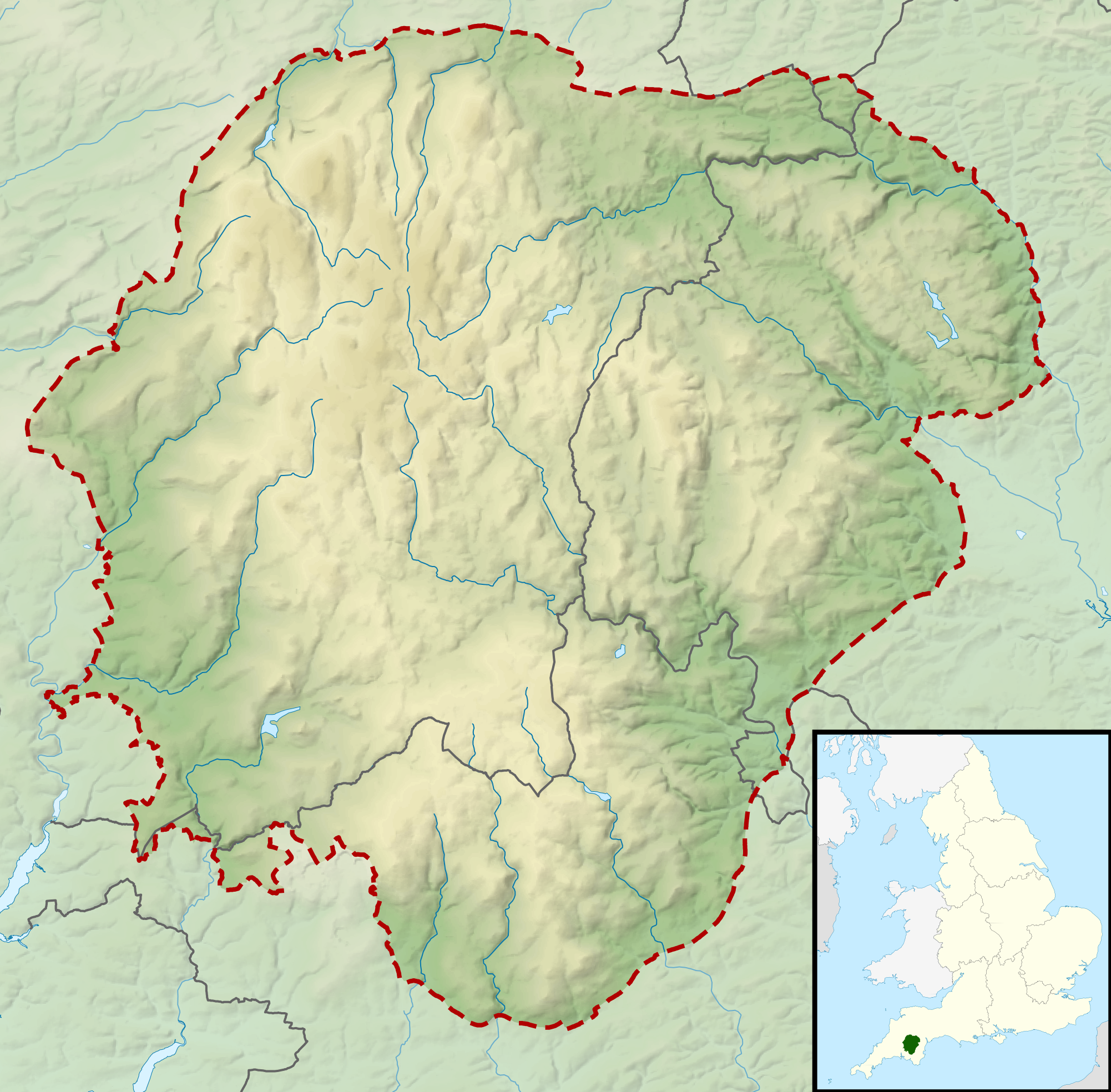
- Location within Dartmoor
- Location: Dartmoor, England
- OS grid: SX734759
- Topo map: OS Explorer OL28: Dartmoor

Climbing
- Easiest route: From Hemsworthy Gate via Top Tor

Pil Tor is a granite tor on the eastern edge of Dartmoor, England. It sits at a height of around 420 metres (1,380 ft).
