= Greator Rocks =

Granite tor on Dartmoor in Devon, England

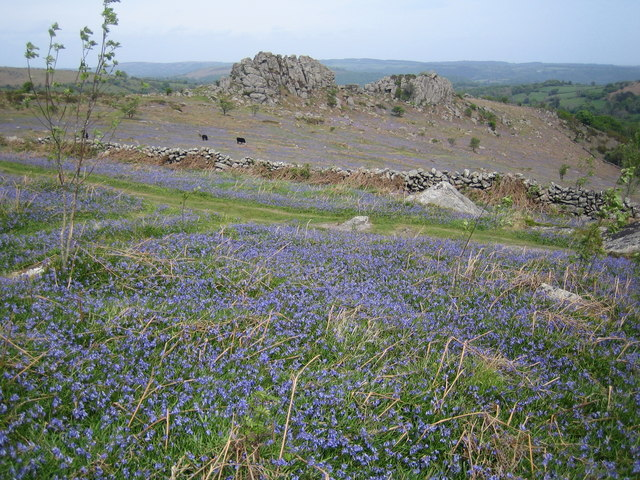
- Greator Rocks with the bluebells of Holwell Lawn in front

Highest point
- Elevation: 371 m (1,217 ft)
- Coordinates: 50°35′38″N 3°46′15″W

Geography
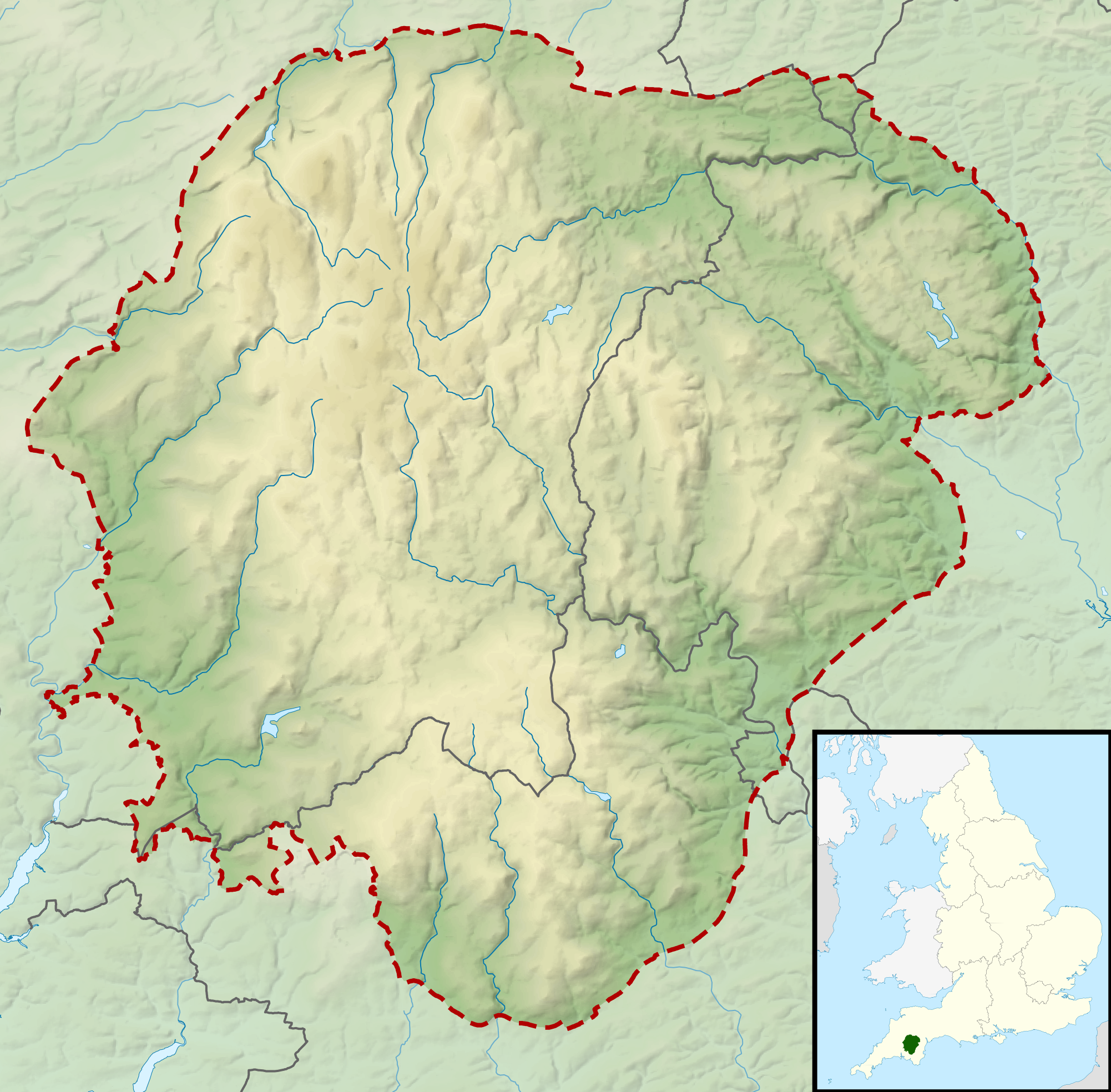
- Location within Dartmoor
- Location: Dartmoor, England
- OS grid: SX747786
- Topo map: OS Explorer OL28: Dartmoor

Climbing
- Easiest route: From Great Houndtor

Greator Rocks, Greater, or Grea Tor, is a dramatic granite tor on Dartmoor, England. It is a common climbing tor, like nearby Hound Tor. It is 371m above sea level.
