= Hookney Tor =

Granite topped hill on Dartmoor in Devon, England

Coordinates: 50°36′59″N 3°50′29″W

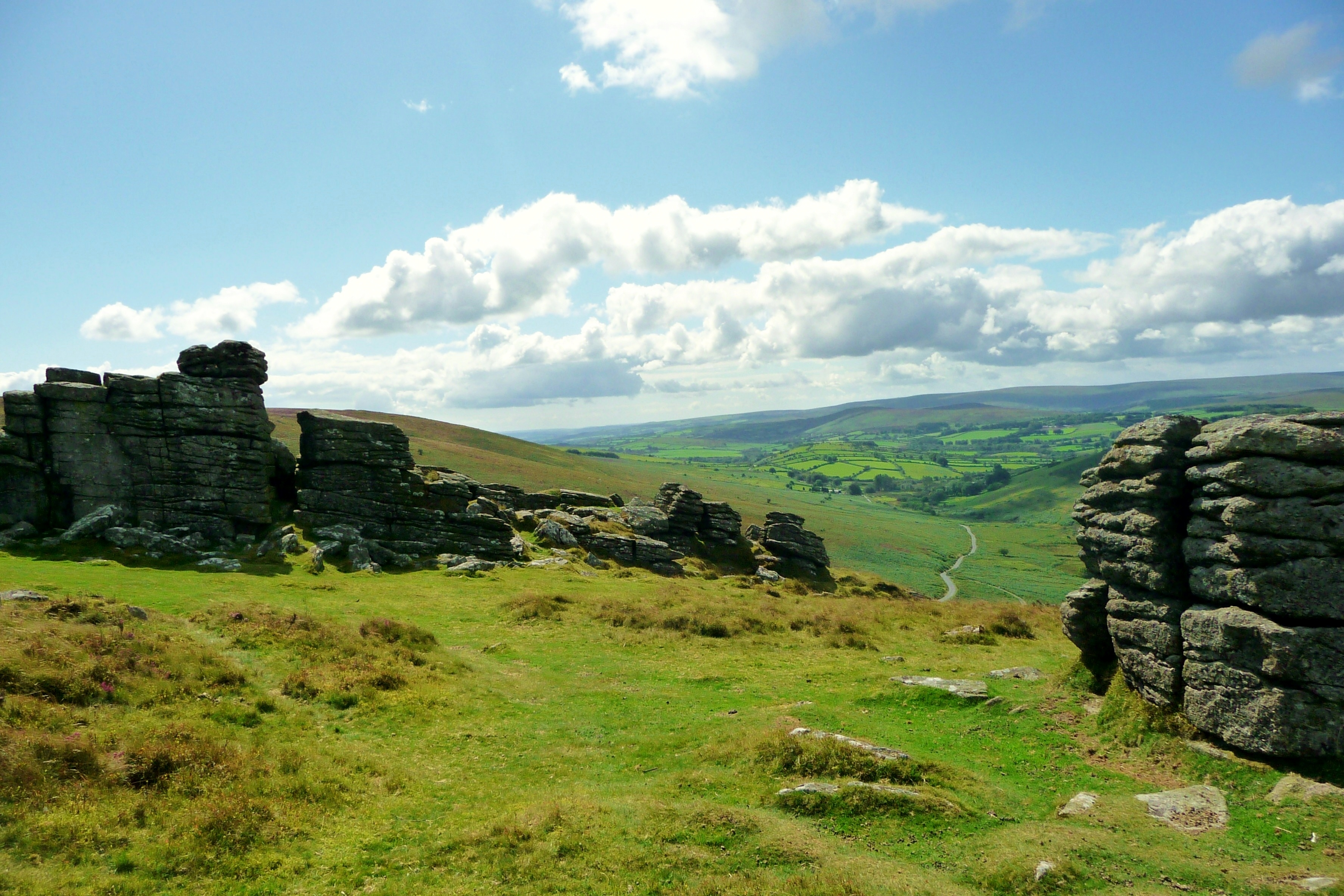
Hookney Tor, looking southeast.

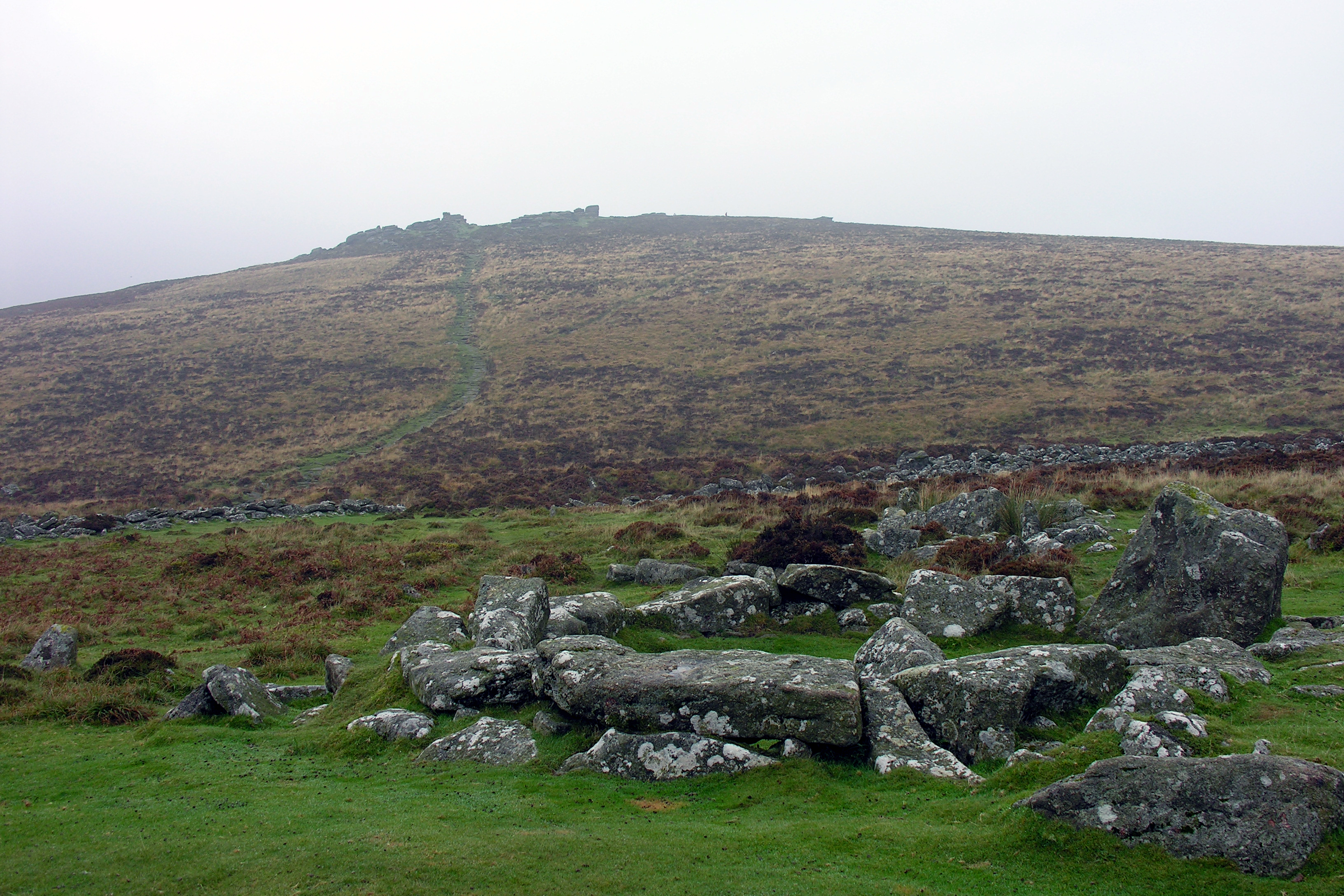
Hookney Tor in the background, seen from Grimspound.

Hookney Tor is a tor, situated on Dartmoor in Devon, England.

It lies on the Two Moors Way and remains of Headland Warren farm and Vitifer Mine are also in the valley nearby.

== Etymology ==
Hookney Tor is named after the nearby settlement of Hookner.

== Description ==
Hookney Tor is a hill and tor in Dartmoor National Park in South West England. It consists of several granite piles and stands at an elevation of 497 metres (1631 feet) above sea level. It has a descent of 22 metres.

The tor is surrounded by the Hookney Tor Cairn in the form of discrete cluster mounds running along the ridge. This includes a rubble bank attached to its southern face. The ring bank survives in a D-shape. The tor itself is 6 metres wide and up to 0.9 metres high.

== Location ==
Hookney Tor is situated in Dartmoor in Devon, England, amidst the Bronze Age settlement of Grimspound to the southeast, Hameldown to the south, Shapley Tor to the north, Birch Tor to the west, and King Tor to the east.

The nearest town is Ashburton 11 miles to the southeast. The nearest village is Widecombe-in-the-Moor several miles to the south.

== See also ==
- List of Dartmoor tors and hills
