= Tunhill Rocks =

Geographic feature in Dartmoor, England

Highest point
- Elevation: 369 m (1,211 ft)
- Prominence: unknown

Geography
- Location: Dartmoor, England
- Parent range: Dartmoor
- OS grid: SX731757
- Topo map: OS Landranger 202

Climbing
- Easiest route: From Hemsworthy Gate car park via Toptor and Piltor

Tunhill Rocks is a collection of granite rocks overlooking the Dartmoor village of Widecombe-in-the-Moor in England. It is close to at least 10 other tors within 2 miles and stands at 369 metres above sea level.
