= Amicombe Hill =

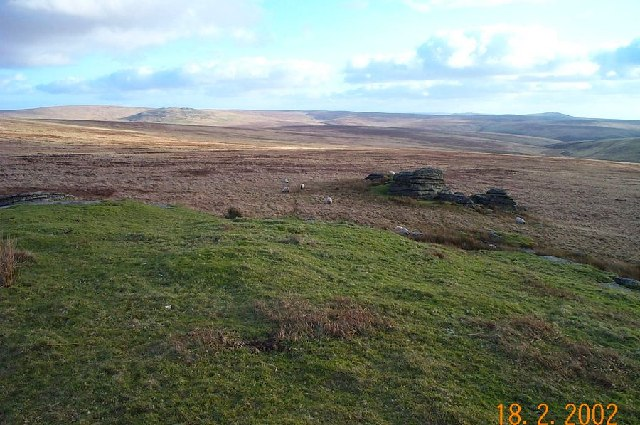
- Amicombe Hill. Looking over from Fur Tor to Green Tor.

Highest point
- Elevation: 584 m (1,916 ft)
- Prominence: 36 m (118 ft)
- Parent peak: High Willhays
- Listing: Dewey, Tump
- Coordinates: 50°40′02″N 4°01′45″W

Geography
- Location: Devon, England
- Parent range: Dartmoor
- OS grid: SX566872
- Topo map: OS Landranger 191, Explorer 28N

Amicombe Hill, also known as the Devil's Dome, is a hill in North Dartmoor in the southwest English county of Devon. At 584 metres high, it is the sixth highest peak in Devon and Dartmoor.

This bleak and remote hill lies within the military training area on Dartmoor and is not accessible to the public except at certain times. It forms an elongated, hooked ridge between the West Okement River to the east and Rattle Brook to the west and southwest.

The actual summit is the rock tor by the flagpole. Near the summit of the hill is Kitty Tor. On the steep eastern hillside are further prominent rocky outcrops, including a logan rock. To the west are the remains of Bleak House and other ruins. Great Links Tor (586m) lies around 1.5 km to the west-southwest and Dartmoor's highest peak, High Willhays (621m), lies about 2 km northeast.
