= Bellever Tor =

Granite tor on Dartmoor, England

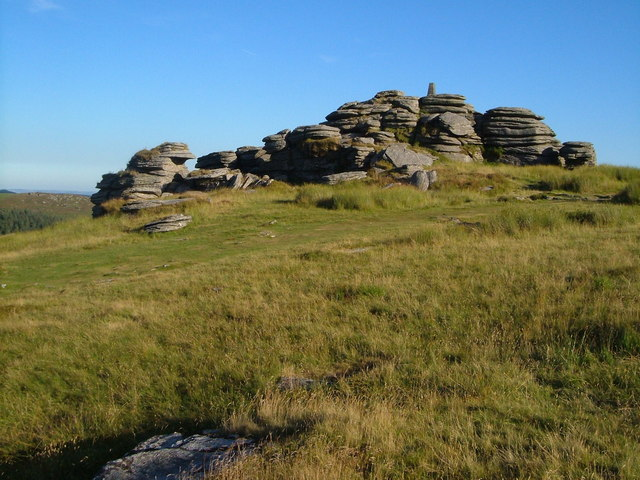
- Bellever Tor.

Highest point
- Elevation: 443 m (1,453 ft)
- Coordinates: 50°34′18″N 3°54′55″W

Geography
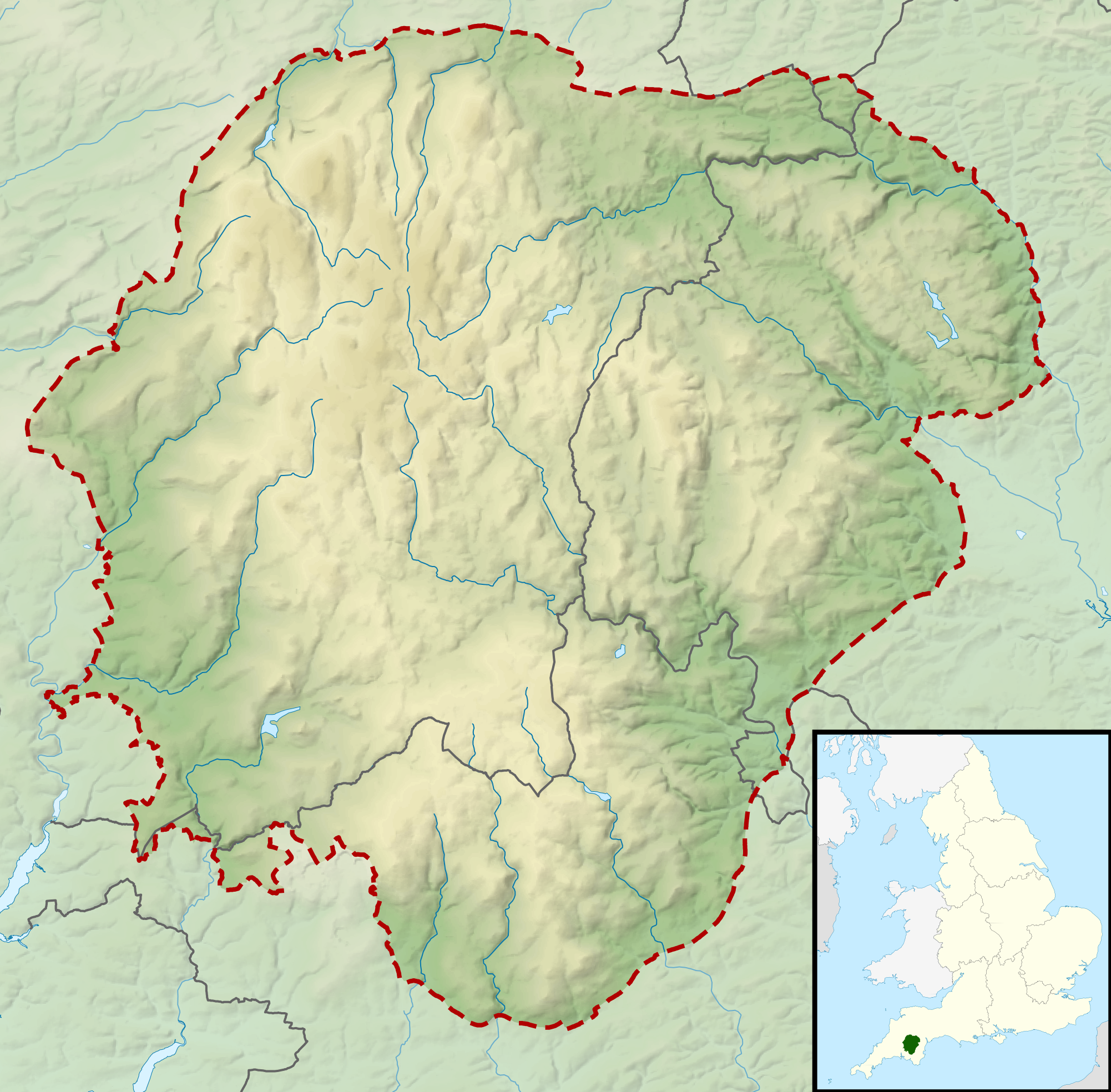
- Location within Dartmoor
- Location: Dartmoor, England
- OS grid: SX644764
- Topo map: OS Explorer OL28: Dartmoor

Climbing
- Easiest route: From Bellever Forest

Bellever Tor is a granite tor in the centre of Dartmoor, England. It provides panoramic 360 degree views and is located near Bellever Forest and the popular village of Bellever. There are numerous kists and cairn circles on its slopes.
