= Easdon Tor =

Granite tor on Dartmoor in Devon, England

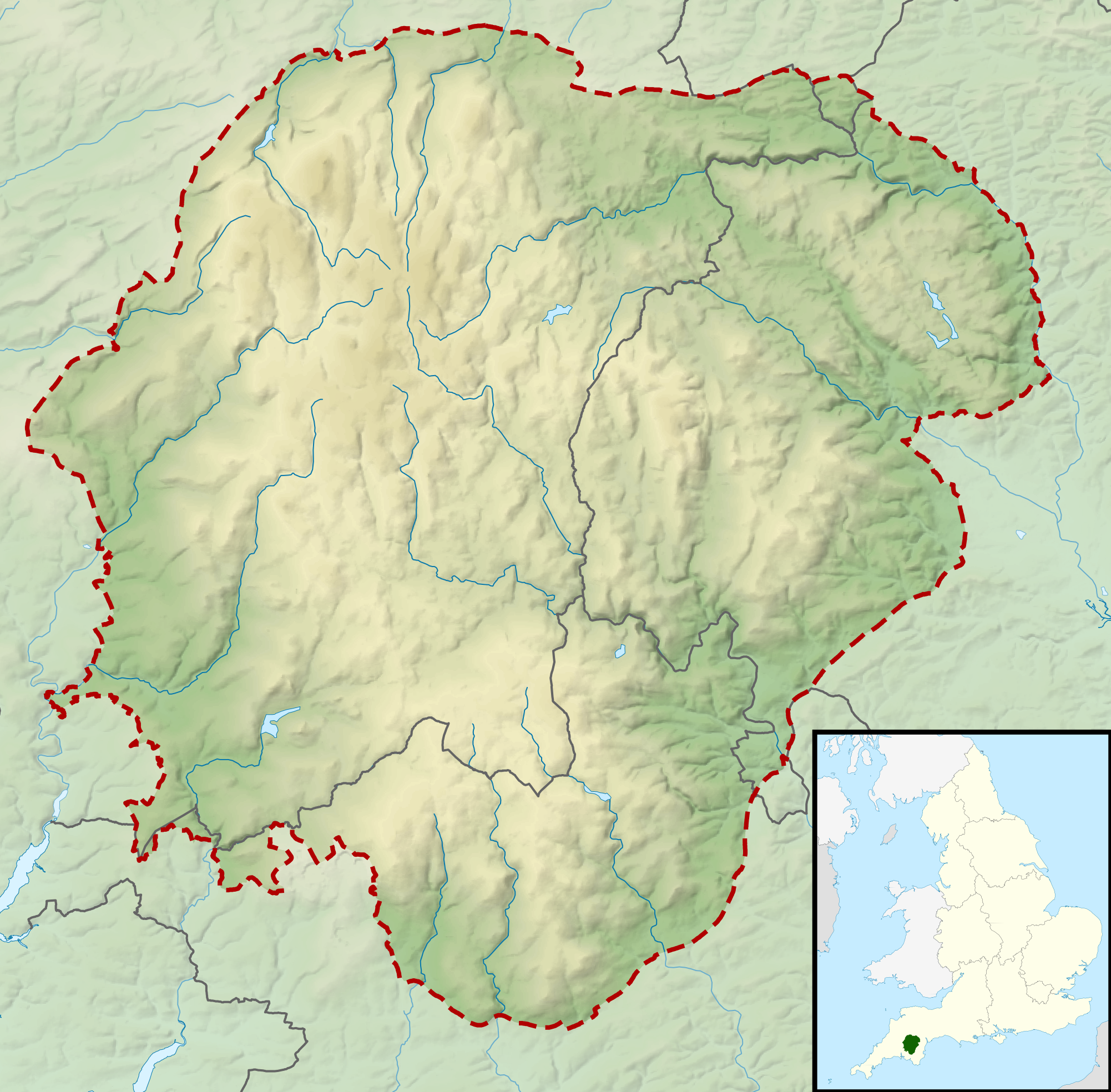
- Location within Dartmoor

Highest point
- Elevation: 439 m (1,440 ft)
- Prominence: 123 m
- Listing: HuMP
- Coordinates: 50°37′36″N 3°47′52″W

Geography
- Location: Dartmoor, England
- Parent range: Dartmoor
- OS grid: SX729823
- Topo map: OS Landranger 202

Climbing
- Easiest route: From Barracott

Easdon Tor is a granite tor on Dartmoor, in southwest England. It stands at 439 metres above sea level and the highest point is marked with a triangulation pillar. It lies in a popular tourist destination, overlooking the popular tors of Houndtor and Haytor, though this tor is quieter than them. To the west lies Hameldown Beacon ridge and to the northwest Cosdon Beacon.
