= Butterdon Hill =

Hill in Devon, England

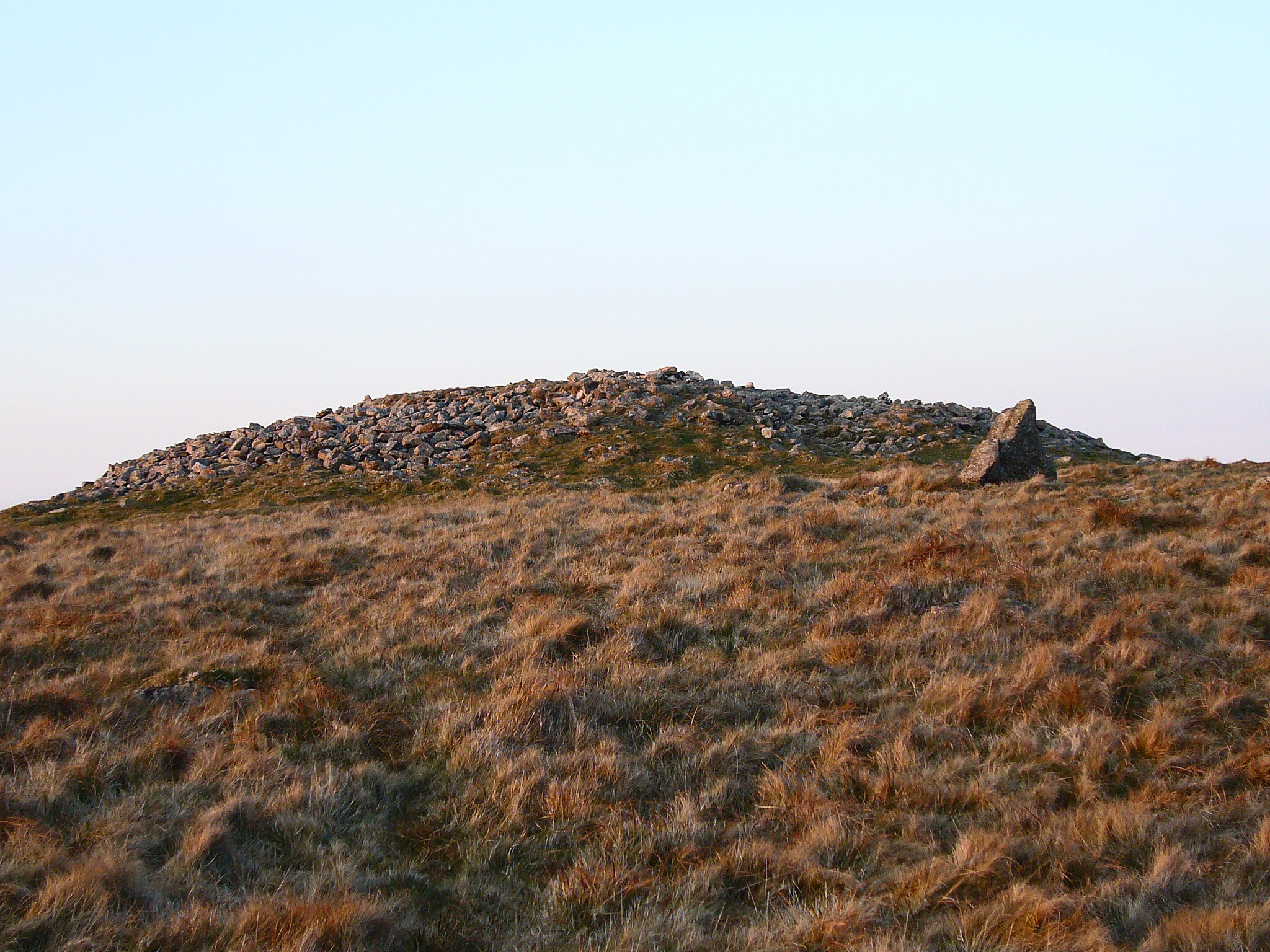
- Butterdon cairn

Highest point
- Elevation: 366 m (1,201 ft)
- Prominence: 17 m
- Coordinates: 50°24′45″N 3°53′38″W

Geography
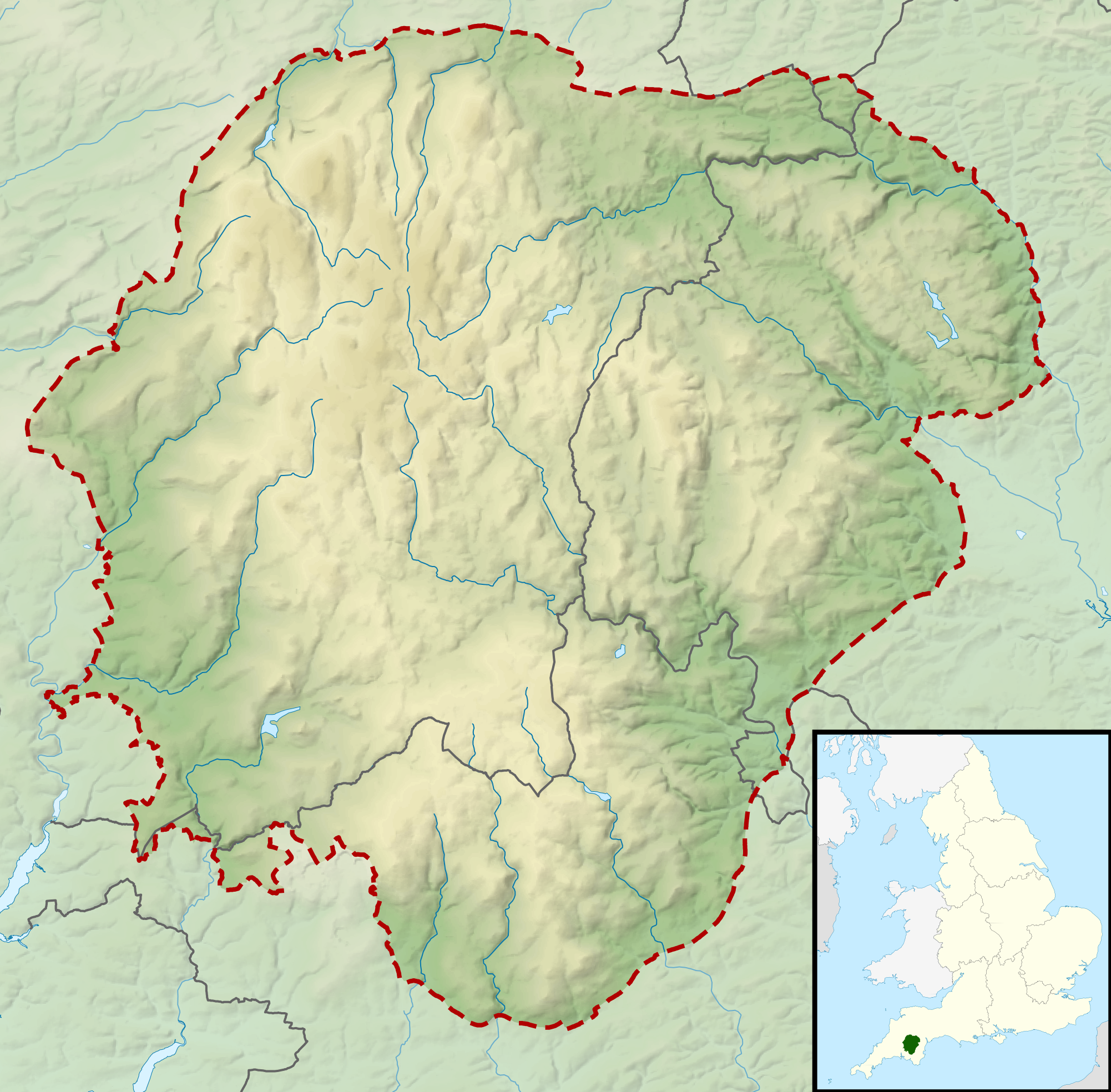
- Location within Dartmoor
- Location: Dartmoor, England
- Parent range: Dartmoor
- OS grid: SX655586
- Topo map: OS Landranger 202

Climbing
- Easiest route: From Western Beacon

Butterdon Hill is on Dartmoor, in southwest England. The remains of a small stone circle and a stone row can be found on the summit. The name Butterdon is believed to derive an Old English word for "pasture".
