= Beardown Tors =

Moorland summit of Dartmoor in Devon, England

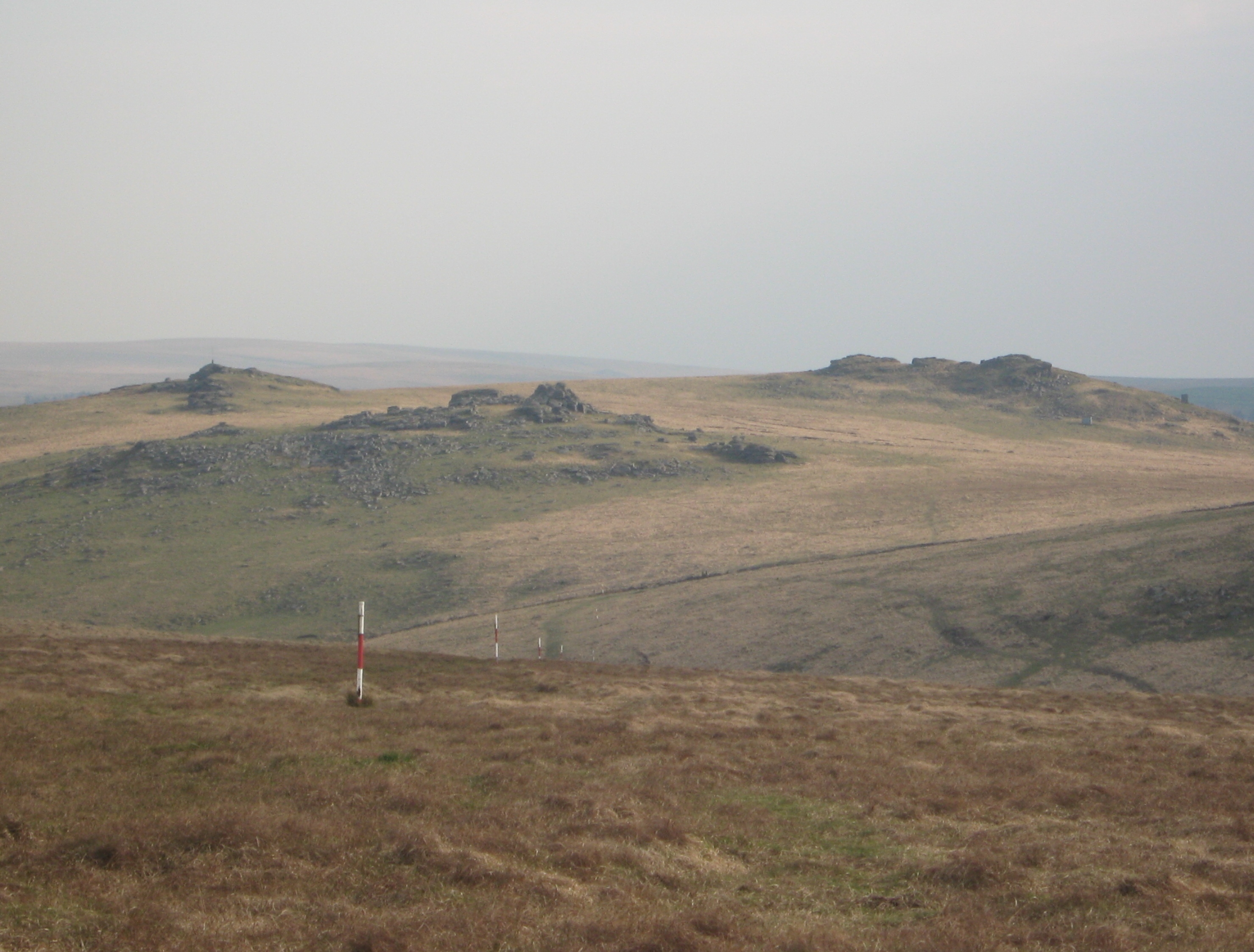
- Beardown Tors from Crow Tor

Highest point
- Elevation: 513 m (1,683 ft)OS OL20
- Prominence: 33m
- Parent peak: Cut Hill
- Listing: Dewey
- Coordinates: 50°34′45″N 3°58′31″W

Geography
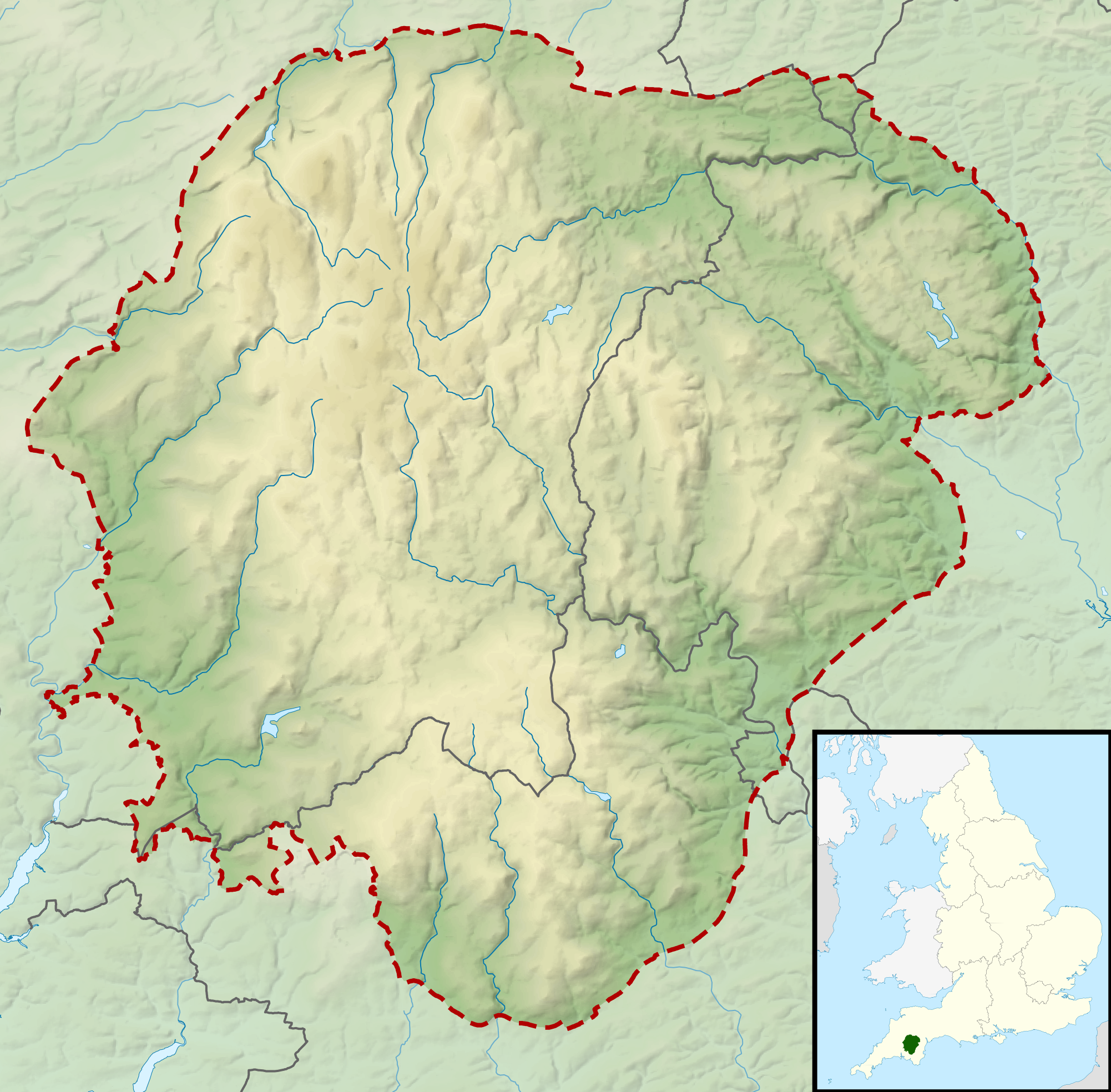
- Location within Dartmoor
- Location: Dartmoor, England
- Parent range: Dartmoor
- OS grid: SX602773
- Topo map: OS Landranger 202

Climbing
- Easiest route: North from Two Bridges, 3km

Beardown Tors is the 14th highest summit of Dartmoor with a height of 513 metres (1,683 ft).
