= Hameldown Tor =

Granite tor on Dartmoor in Devon, England

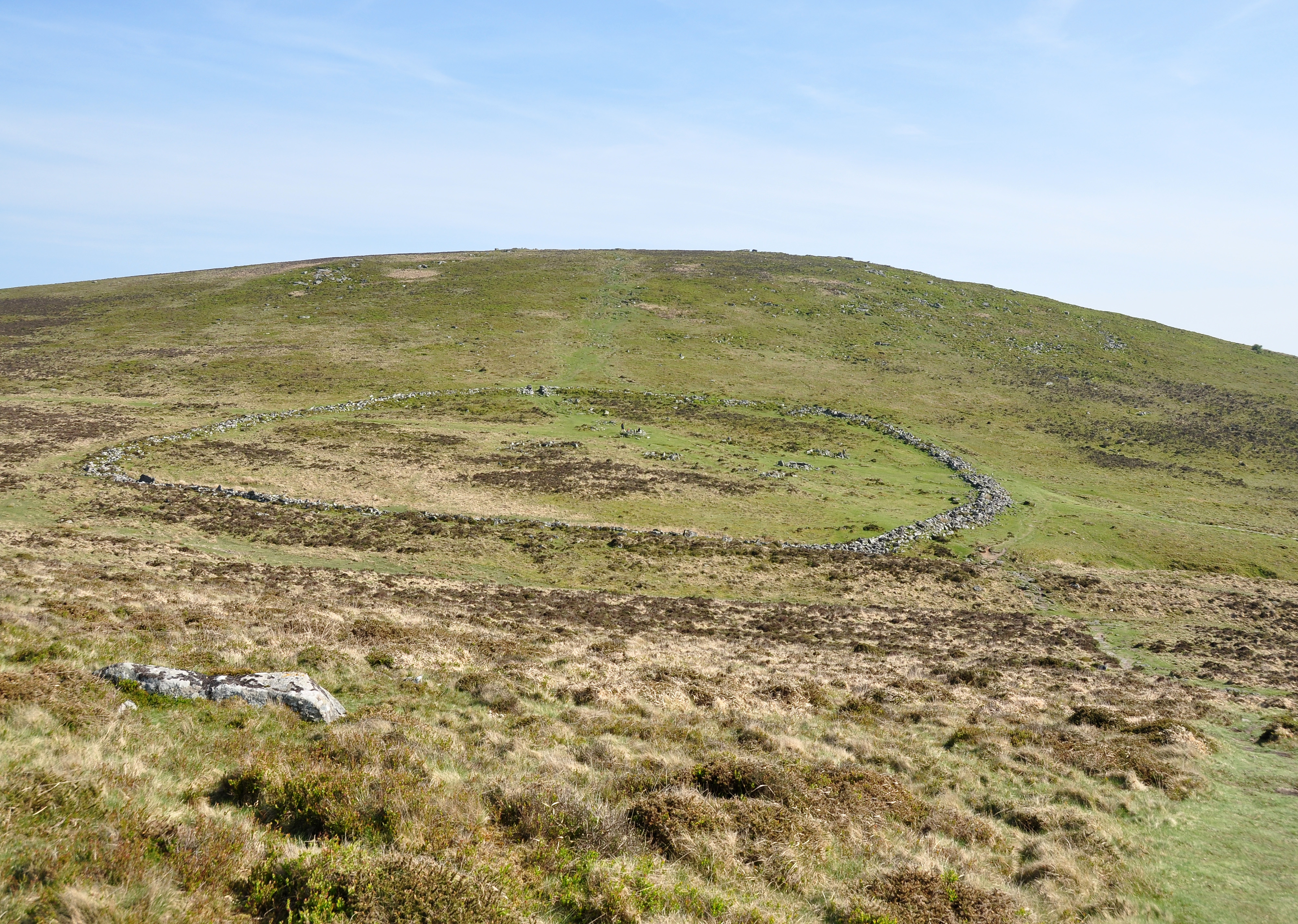
Grimspound at the foot of Hameldown

Hameldown Tor is a granite tor on Dartmoor in the English county of Devon. It is at grid reference SX7031380571. It is situated above the Bronze Age settlement of Grimspound and lies on the northern edge of a ridge extending towards Widecombe. This ridge forms part of the central route of the Two Moors Way. Hameldown Tor has fantastic far reaching views and is one of the tallest tors in this part of Dartmoor. It has a trig point on the highest point of the ridge at 1736ft (529m).

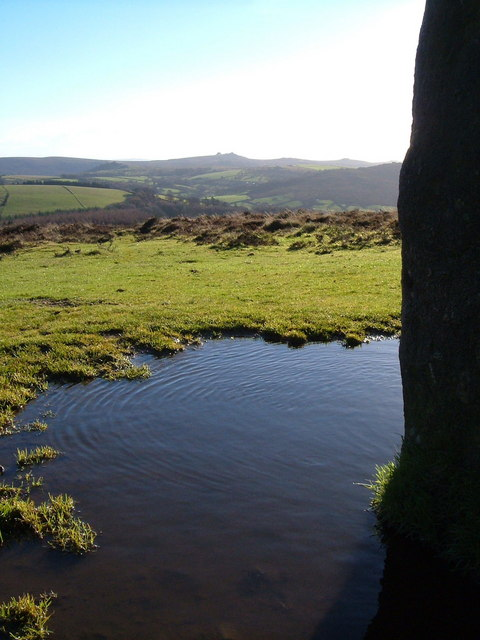
View from the Hameldown memorial

The tor is also the site of a memorial to four crew members of an RAF bomber who were killed in a crash in 1941. The pilot's mother had the memorial erected the year after the crash.
