= Sharp Tor =

Sharp Tor is a common name given to tors (outcrops), particularly on Dartmoor and Bodmin Moor, in England. All the outcrops named "Sharp Tors" are listed below with their location and height:

- Sharp Tor - Dartmoor (Southern Dartmoor, on Ugborough Moor) - 414m
- Sharp Tor - Dartmoor (Dartmeet, on Dartmoor) - 380m
- Sharp Tor - Dartmoor (North West Dartmoor, Nr Lydford) - 519m
- Sharp Tor - Dartmoor (North east Dartmoor, Nr Drewsteignton, Teign Gorge) - 222m
- Sharp Tor - Dartmoor (East Dartmoor, Nr Chinkwell Tor, Widecombe-in-the-Moor) - 418m
- Sharp Tor - Dartmoor (West Dartmoor, Nr Peter Tavy) - 340m
- Sharp Tor - Dartmoor (Tavy Cleave, on Dartmoor) - 440m
- Sharp Tor - Bodmin Moor (Near Minions, on Langstone Downs) - 366m
- Sharp Tor - Salcombe (Nr Bolt Head, South Devon) - 123m

Sharpitors may also be included in which two extra tors are added to the list:

- Sharpitor - Dartmoor (South west Dartmoor, Nr Burrator Reservoir) - 402m
- Sharpitor - Dartmoor (North east Dartmoor, Nr Lustleigh) - 246m
