= Ryder's Hill =

Hill on Dartmoor in Devon, England

Coordinates: 50.5060°N 3.8913°W

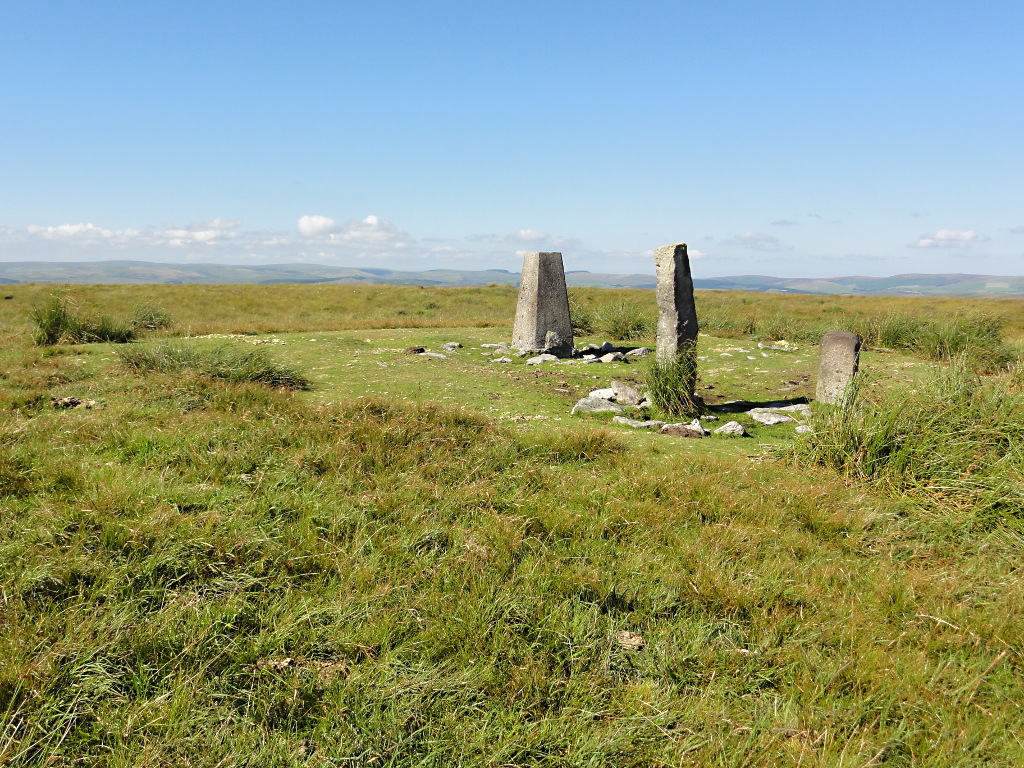
The Summit of Ryders Hill

At 515 m, Ryder's Hill is the highest point on the southern part of Dartmoor, Devon, England. On its summit there are two standing stones and a low cairn, on top of which is a triangulation pillar.

One of the standing stones is called Petre's Bound Stone and it marks the boundary of three civil parishes: Dartmoor Forest, Holne and Buckfastleigh. The cairn, which is not very prominent, has an important history. It was one of the boundary markers of the Forest of Dartmoor mentioned in the Perambulation of 1240 and has been known as "Knattleborough" (or variations of that name) since at least the 17th century.

Ryder's Hill can be reached by walking up Holne Ridge from Combestone Tor, past Horn's Cross, a distance of about 3 km. From the summit there are good views over southern Dartmoor.
