= Great Mis Tor =

Granite tor on Dartmoor in Devon, England

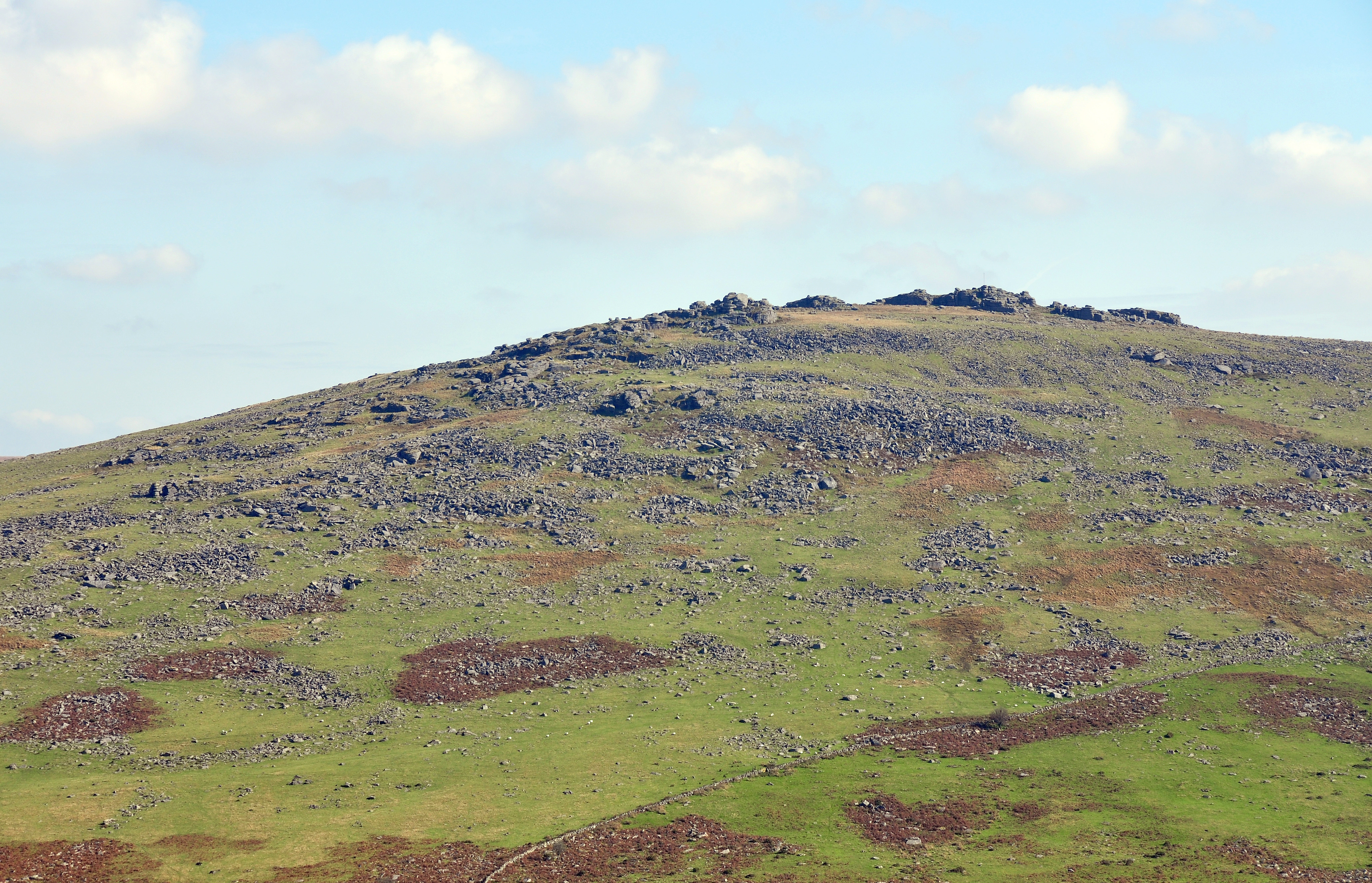
- Great Mis Tor, seen from the neighbouring Roos Tor

Highest point
- Elevation: 538 m (1,765 ft)
- Prominence: 80m
- Listing: Dewey
- Coordinates: 50°34′30″N 4°01′51″W

Geography
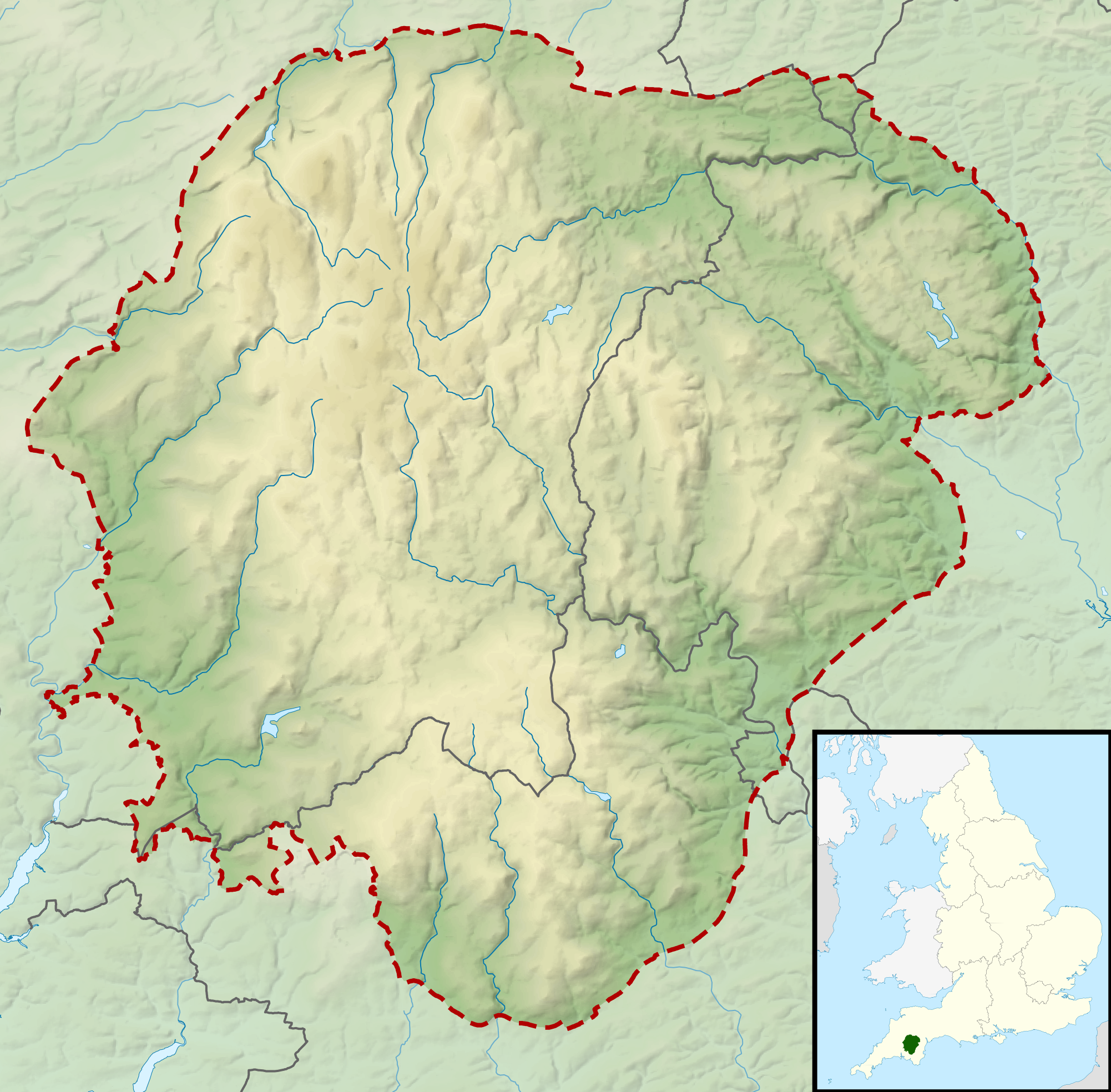
- Location within Dartmoor
- Location: Devon, England
- Parent range: Dartmoor,
- OS grid: SX563770
- Topo map: OS Landrangers 191, Explorer OL28

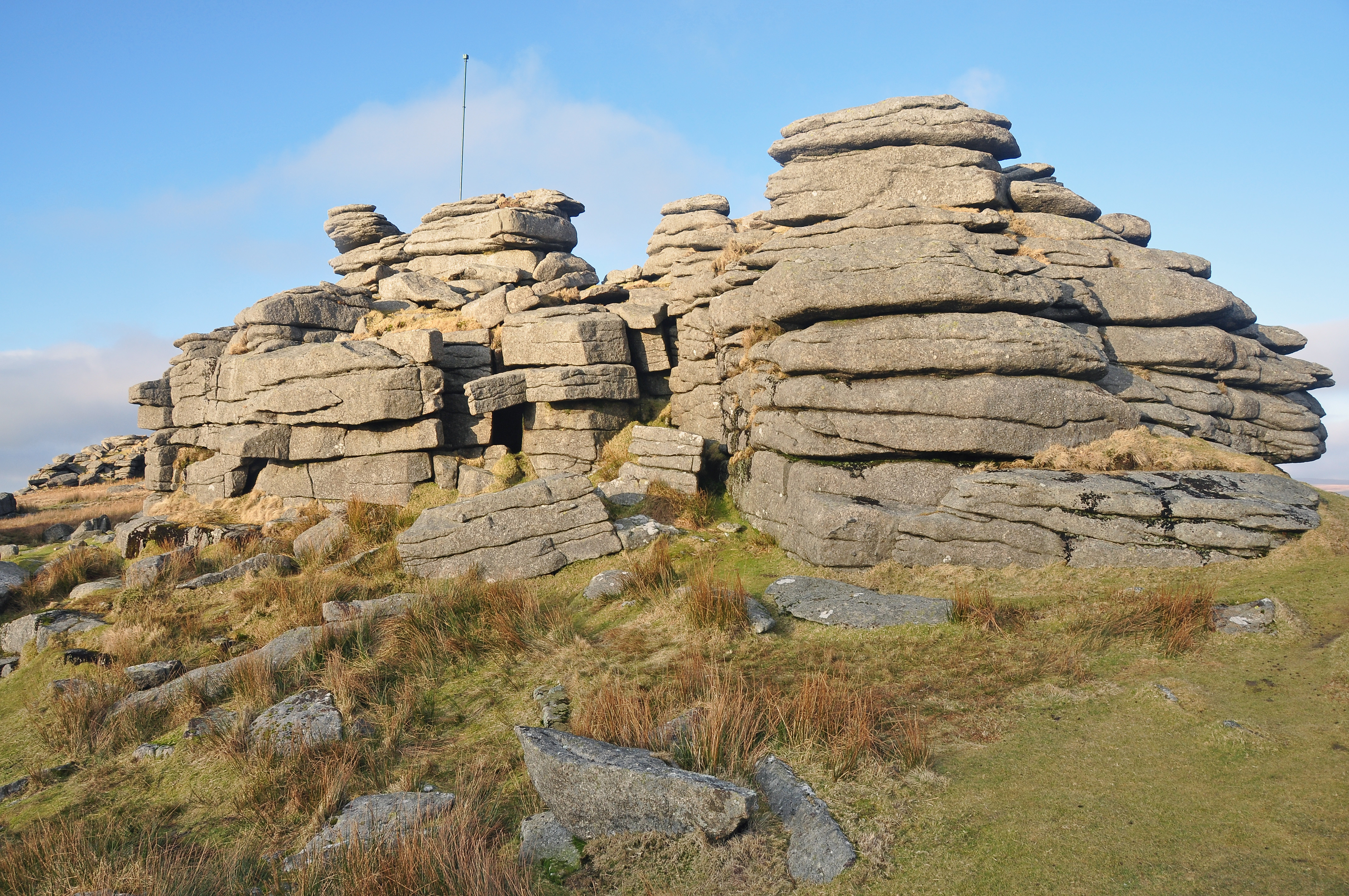
Rock outcropping at the summit. The flagpole is used when military exercises are taking place on the moors.

Great Mis Tor is a hill with a rocky outcrop situated in Dartmoor, England. It has been called one of the grandest hills in Devon, and lies above the River Walkham, about 4 miles north-east of Princetown.

There is a notable rock basin on the peak, called the Mis Tor Pan or The Devil's Frying Pan.

The hill and surrounding area is on land owned by the Duchy of Cornwall, which is leased to the army. There have been cases of deaths and injury to the public caused by unexploded munitions in the area.
