= Great Links Tor =

Granite tor on Dartmoor in Devon, England

Coordinates: 50°39′N 4°03′W

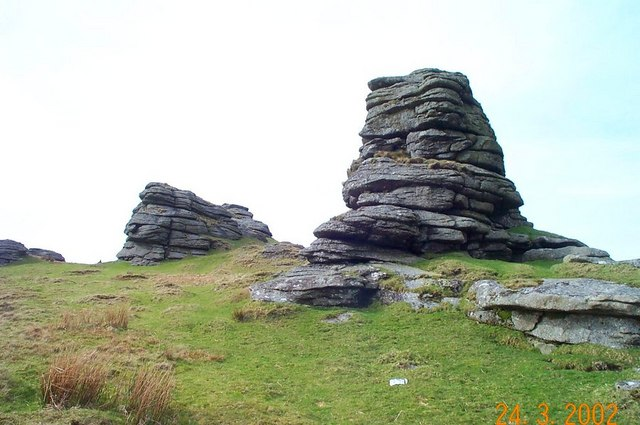
Great Links Tor

Great Links Tor is a prominent tor on the north-western flank of Dartmoor, Devon, England. It is visible for a considerable distance on the approach to the moor from the west. It is one of the highest points on Dartmoor, standing 1,939 feet (591 m) above sea level and is dominated by a monolithic outcropping of granite some 40 feet (12 m) high. There is an OS Triangulation point on a block to the west of the main outcrop, which is where most who visit the tor will climb to. The highest outcrop is inaccessible without a climb, the easiest route being up the eastern chimney (grade D). Other routes can be found here. Close by are the remains of the Rattlebrook Peat Works at Rattlebrook Head and the ruins of the appropriately named 'Bleak House'.
