= North Dartmoor =

Protected area in Devon, England

Coordinates: 50°39′N 4°0′W

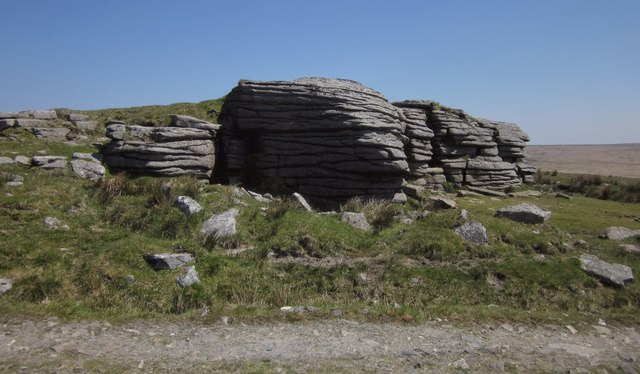
Dinger Tor

North Dartmoor is a Site of Special Scientific Interest (SSSI) in Dartmoor National Park, Devon, England. It is located north of the village of Princetown and south of the town of Oakhampton. Covering 135.59 km^{2} (52.35 sq mi), it extends from Crow Tor in the south to Scarey Tor in the north. Rivers that have their source in this protected area include West Okement River, East Okement River, Doetor Brook, Walla Brook, River Tavey, Cowsic River, West Dart River, East Dart River and River Taw. Taw Marsh is located within this protected area. The National Nature Reserve called Black-a-Tor Copse is within North Dartmoor SSSI and is located in the valley of West Okement River. North Dartmoor is protected because of its peatlands (peat is several metres thick in places) and the diversity of upland birds present.

North Dartmoor SSSI borders three other Sites of Special Scientific Interest: Meldon Quarry SSSI and Meldon Aplite Quarry SSSI to the north and Wistman's Wood SSSI to the south. It is part of the Dartmoor Special Area of Conservation.

== Biology ==
Plants in the blanket bog peatlands include cross-leaved heath, heather, round-leaved sundew and bog asphodel. Moss species include Sphagnum capillifolium and Sphagnum papillosum and Sphagnum auriculatum. Moss species in pools include Sphagnum cuspidatum. The moss Racomitrium lanuginosum is found on rocks. In valley mires, the plant called bogbean is found and mosses include Sphagnum recurvum and Polytrichum commune.

In heathland habitats, plants include heather, cross-leaved heath, western gorse and bilbery. Cranberry occurs on the open moor. Moss species include Pleurozium schreberi, Rhytidiadelphus loreus, Racomitrium lanuginosum, Hylocomium splendens, Thuidium tamariscinum, Hypnum jutlandicum, Cladonia arbuscula and Cladonia uncialis.

On scree slopes, fern species include lemon-scented fern (genus Oreopteris), Tunbridge Filmy-fern and Wilson’s Filmy-fern. Fir clubmoss has also been recorded on scree slopes.

Black-a-Tor Copse is an upland woodland where pedunculate oak dominates. Granite boulders in this woodland are covered in mosses, including Rhytidiadelphus loreus, Thuidium tamariscinum and Plagiothecium undulatum. Lichen species in this woodland include Mycoblastis affinis (genus Mycoblastis) , Usnea filipendula, Arthonia stellaris (genus Arthonia), Micaria botyroides, Micaria cinerea, Micaria violacea (genus Micaria) and Gyalideopsis muscicola (genus Gyalideopsis), Bryoria smithii (genus Bryoria). Lichens growing on rocks include Massalongia carnosa (genus Massalongia), Ochrolechia tartarea (genus Ochrolechia ), Pilophorus strumaticus (genus Pilophorus) and Parmelia discordans (genus Parmelia).

Bird species in this protected area include golden plover, dunlin, whinchat, wheatear and ring ouzel.

== Geology ==
The underlying rock is granite and the soils are very acidic. Pollen recorded in the soils at Black Ridge Brook provide an important palynological record of past vegetation and tree cover.

== Land ownership ==
Major landowners that own land within North Dartmoor SSSI are the Duchy of Cornwall and the Ministry of Defence. Part of the Dartmoor Training Area (military training) is within North Dartmoor SSSI.
