= Meldon Viaduct =

Bridge in United Kingdom

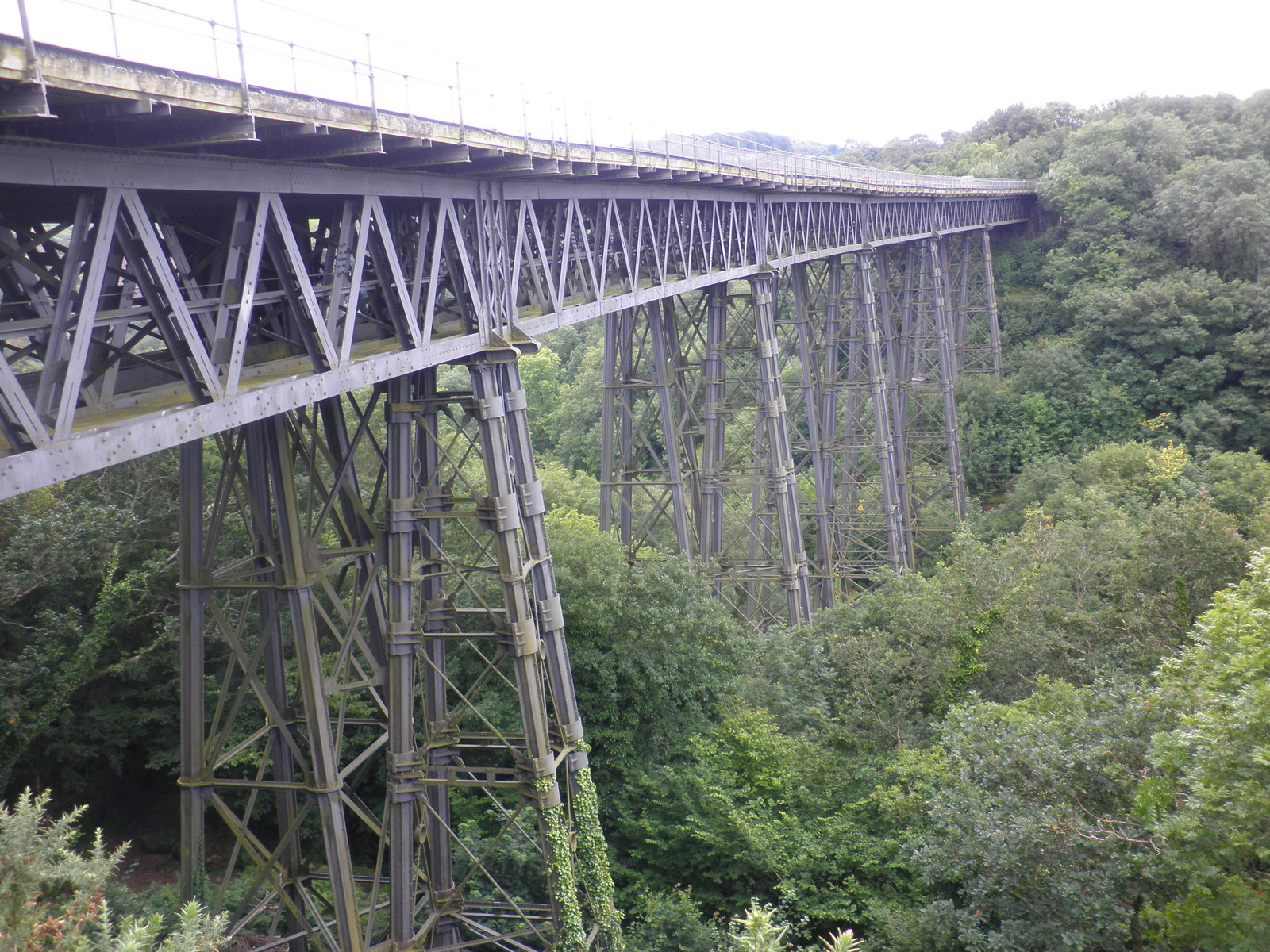
- Meldon Viaduct in 2010
- Coordinates: 50°42′47″N 4°02′03″W
- Carries: The Granite Way cycle & walkway
- Crosses: West Okement River
- Locale: Dartmoor
- Owner: Meldon Viaduct Company Ltd
- Heritage status: Scheduled monument

Characteristics
- Design: Warren trusses on lattice trestles
- Material: Wrought iron
- Total length: 535 ft (163 m)
- Width: Double-track standard gauge rail
- Height: 151 ft (46 m)
- No. of spans: 6

History
- Engineering design by: W. R. Galbraith
- Opened: 12 October 1874
- Closed: 1990

Location
- Interactive map of Meldon Viaduct

Meldon Viaduct is a disused railway viaduct crossing the West Okement River at Meldon, 2 1/2 miles (4.0 km) south-west of Okehampton, on the edge of Dartmoor in Devon, South West England. This truss bridge was constructed from wrought iron, instead of stone or brick arches. It opened in 1874 for a single track; in 1879 its width was doubled for a second track. Although regular services were withdrawn in 1968, the bridge was used for shunting by a local quarry. In the 1990s the remaining single track was removed.

The crossing is now used by the Granite Way, a cycle track skirting Dartmoor. It is a scheduled monument, and is one of only two surviving railway bridges in the United Kingdom that use wrought iron lattice piers to support wrought iron trusses.

== History ==
In the 19th century, the London and South Western Railway (LSWR) was in competition with the Great Western Railway (GWR) to provide passenger trains from London to Devon and Cornwall. But the South Devon Railway, an associate of the GWR, had already built a line from Exeter St Davids to Plymouth along the south coast and the south side of Dartmoor, under the direction of Isambard Kingdom Brunel. Thus the LSWR, and its engineer, William Galbraith, were left with a route from Exeter that would have to skirt around the north and west sides of Dartmoor.

Meldon Viaduct was begun in 1871, and opened on 12 October 1874, linking Okehampton and Lydford (Lidford). It was part of the LSWR's routes to Plymouth (from 1876) and Bude (from 1898) via Okehampton. Originally it carried a single track, but it was doubled in 1879 when a second viaduct of similar design was constructed next to it and the two were joined. This was done while the original track remained open. To obviate high scaffolding, the trestles were erected by derricks mounted on the original structure. The 12 trusses, each weighing 21 long tons, were constructed nearby and lifted by two heavily-ballasted, rail-mounted cranes, which were then pulled onto the original bridge, and the truss lowered into position. (Note: A photo of the viaduct being widened in 1879 is shown in this book (facing page 1)) Each truss was installed in about 2 hours 30 minutes, thus the work could be arranged around the railway timetable without closing the line. The method, devised by engineer T. Wrightson and supervised on site by W. Jacomb, worked well, and the entire ironwork was erected in 16 weeks. On 5 May 1931 a carpenter, F. Rook, was killed in an accident while replacing timber decking on the down line.

The viaduct is 535 ft (163 m) long, standing 151 ft (46 m) above the bottom of the valley. It has a slight curve (Note: The horizontal radius is 1,980 ft (30.0 chains; 600 m).) which, combined with its exposed position, resulted in speed and weight restrictions being applied to trains crossing it. The speed limit was set at 20 mph (32 km/h) in 1927.

In 1938 braces were added between the lower ends of the older trestles. In 1944, to allow heavy wartime traffic, the outer trestle legs were weighted with additional concrete to resist uplift. The viaduct was further strengthened from 1959–1960, with the inner trestle legs being weighted, and the bracing of the original trestles being replaced with stronger members.

Passenger services on the line were withdrawn in 1968, after which the line reverted to a single track and the viaduct was used predominantly for shunting freight trains serving the ballast quarry at Meldon. In 1970, a road was built across the viaduct to permit lorries access to the Meldon Dam construction site. The bridge was assessed in 1990 as being too weak to carry trains and the rails were removed. Six years later, the viaduct was refurbished and re-opened as part of the 11-mile (18 km) Granite Way, a combined cycle and foot path (part of NCR27). It is now a scheduled monument, and is owned by Meldon Viaduct Company Ltd, a charitable company set up in 1998 to safeguard it.

At various times since the closure of the line, local people and enthusiasts have campaigned for its re-opening, a campaign which gained added prominence in 2014 after severe winter storms severed the Great Western Main Line at Dawlish in February. According to Network Rail, the condition of Meldon Viaduct was a significant obstacle to the re-opening of the line, and it would need to be replaced before trains could run on the line.

== Design ==
The viaduct is constructed mainly of wrought iron. It is one of two surviving wrought iron truss and trestle railway bridges in the United Kingdom, the other being the Bennerley Viaduct, between Nottinghamshire and Derbyshire, which differs by having lattice trusses (meaning the diagonals are criss-crossed). (Note: The only road bridge in the UK supported by metal lattice trestles is Ovingham Road Bridge.)

The structure is actually two viaducts side-by-side. Each viaduct consists of six spans of 90 ft (27 m), bridged by a pair of Warren trusses at 5-foot (1.5 m) centres, which are supported by five lattice trestles. When the original viaduct was widened to allow double-track operation, a second viaduct (Note: Some sources claim this is wrought iron, others welded steel (despite being clearly riveted and bolted).) of almost identical construction was erected on its south-east side, 7 ft 6 in (2.29 m) from the original one, with the gap spanned by bracing and timber decking. The new viaduct then carried the down line (from London). The trusses are 9 ft 4 in (2.84 m) high. The bottom (tension) members of each newer truss include a continuous plate underneath for extra strength. The trestles vary in height from 48 ft (15 m) to 120 ft (37 m); each is constructed of four columns connected by horizontal and diagonal bracing. Each column is made of a varying number of sections, end-to-end, each consisting of six flanged curved pieces riveted together side-by-side. The trestles taper inwards from the bottom, and rest on 24-foot (7.3 m) wide masonry bases, the newer trestles straddling the older ones at the bottom.

At each end of the viaduct, the trusses are supported on cast-iron sliding bearings on four cast-iron cylinders filled with concrete, which are deeply embedded in the ground.

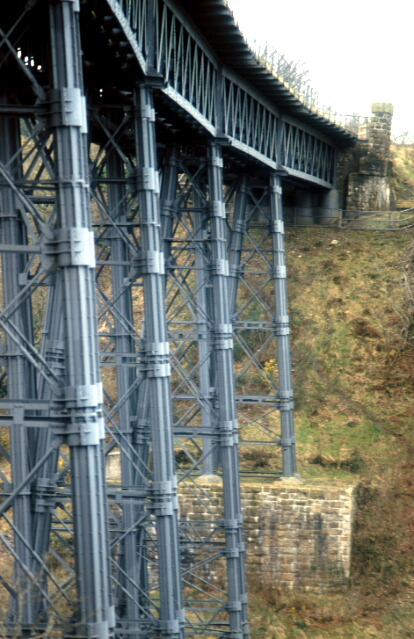
The Victorian ironwork's gentle curve spanning the gorge, a masonry base, and abutment cylinders

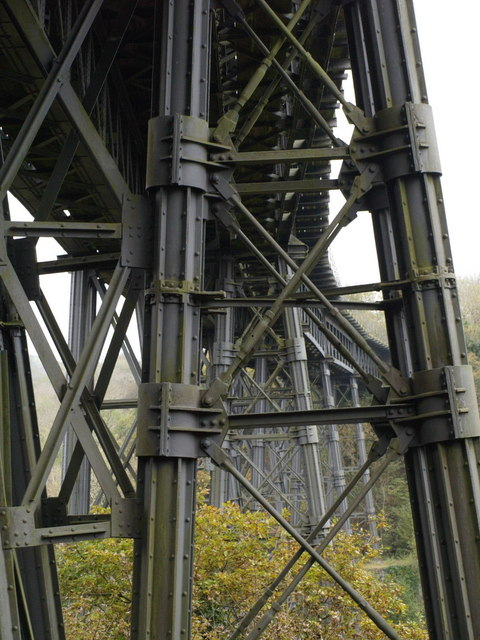
Trestle detail, showing added collars and adjustable braces on the originals

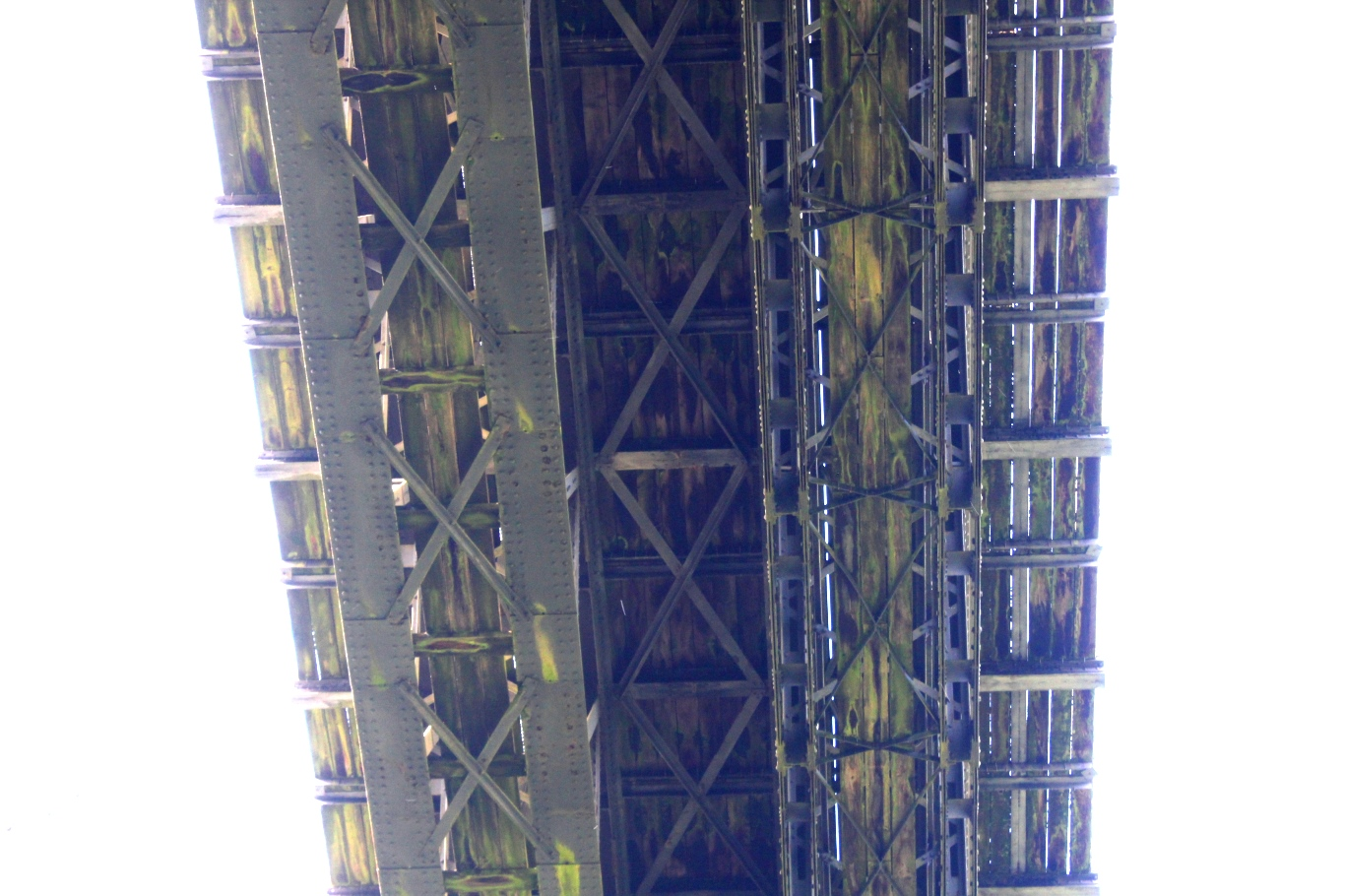
Underside of trusses (originals on the right), and cantilevered deck
