= Nine Maidens stone circle =

Bronze Age stone circle in Devon, England

Coordinates: 50°43′07″N 3°58′02″W

- Seventeen Brothers
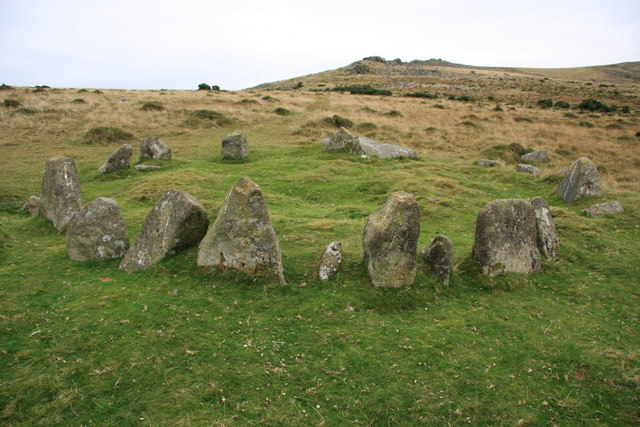
- Nine Maidens stone circle

- Location within Devon
- Interactive map of Nine Maidens stone circle
- Type: Stone circle
- Periods: Bronze Age
- Location: Belstone, Devon

Scheduled monument
- Official name: Nine Stones ring cairn on Belstone Common
- Designated: 27 October 1971
- Reference no.: 1017871

The Nine Maidens, also known as the Seventeen Brothers, is a Bronze Age stone circle located near the village of Belstone on Dartmoor in Devon, England. The stone circle functioned as a burial chamber, although the cairn has since been robbed and the cist, known locally as a kistvaen, destroyed.

== Description ==
The Nine Maidens is an incomplete stone circle with sixteen still standing. The circle stands to the west of the village of Belstone in an area of clitter. This additional source of stone may have saved the destruction of the circle by local masons. None of the stones are much higher than three feet (one metre) and the diameter of the circle is approximately twenty-one feet (seven metres). Samuel Rowe, a nineteenth-century rambler, provided a description of the stones in his 1848 book A Perambulation of the Ancient and Royal Forest of Dartmoor and the Venville Precincts:

We shall mount the steep ascent towards Belstone Tor, and within a quarter of a mile, on its western slope, we shall observe the circle called in the neighbourhood Nine Stones, but which in reality consists of seventeen stones, erect, the highest of which is not more than two feet and a half from the ground.

The missing seventeenth stone may have since fallen down to join several other stones that are no longer upright. The Book of Belstone says the tally of stones can be increased to twenty should 'small stones and five toppled or insecure temporary ones' be included. Dora James wrote in 1930 that four stones had been 'wantonly defaced and broken' in 1929.

== Folklore ==
Despite the fallen stones, locals are said to be apprehensive of restoration work, believing that tamperers will be cursed. Locals cite a film crew which added a stone to the circle in 1985—the 'curse' was the unfortunate loss of the only copy of the film, The Circle of Doom, in the post.

St Michael's ley-line, which runs 350 miles from Land's End to Hopton-on-Sea, Norfolk, runs through the Nine Maidens. This ley-line goes through many sites dedicated to St Michael, such as St Michael's Tower on Glastonbury Tor, with the line matching the sunrise on 8 May when the Catholic Church celebrated the apparition of St Michael.

Local folklore suggests that the stones dance:

The stone circles on Dartmoor, are said to have been made "when there were wolves on the hills, and winged serpents in the low lands." On the side of Belstone Tor, near Oakhampton [sic], is a small grave circle called "Nine Stones." It is said to dance every day at noon.

The stones are said to have originally been nine maidens who were cast into stone and damned to dancing every noon for eternity as a punishment for dancing on the Sabbath. Equally, the story has involved seventeen brothers. It is also said that the ringing of the nearby church bells brings them to life.

=== Etymology ===
The differing number of stones cited in the name is explained in folklore through the fact that the stones are not still enough whilst dancing to count their number accurately. John Chudleigh noted in 1892 that heated air which rises from the ground gives the appearance of movement, which may give an origin to the legends of dancing maidens.

Another etymological explanation is based on Phoenician tin traders. The Phoenicians worshipped the god of life and fertility Baal with Belstone representing a corruption of 'Baal's ton', that is 'Baal's settlement'. The stone circle could be related to this interpretation, with a reference to the Phoenicians dragging a stone in the shape of a sacred bull to the summit of the tor and worshipping it. It has been suggested that locals who knew of this legend placed a stone there to fulfil the legend. Other explanations for the name Belstone have been given including the Old English 'belle' (bell) and 'stan' (stone), which Sabine Baring-Gould suggests could be in reference to a logan stone.

=== Folkloric poetry ===
A poem illustrating the folklore surrounding the stones is recorded in The Witchcraft and Folklore of Dartmoor by Ruth St Leger-Gordon, originally written by Eden Phillpotts in the Book of Avis trilogy:

And now at every Hunter's Moon
That haggard cirque of stones so still
Awakens to immortal thrill
And seven small maidens in silver shoon
Twixt dark of night and white of day
Twinkle upon the sere old heath
Like living blossoms in a wreath
Then shrink again to granite grey.
So blue-eyed Dian shall ever dance
With Linnette, Bethkin, Jennifer,
Arisa, Petronell and Nance.

St Leger-Gordon suggests Phillpotts could be referring to another stone circle due to certain inaccuracies in the poem, although these inaccuracies could simply be a generous usage of artistic licence. Hunter's moon refers to the first full moon following the harvest moon and usually occurs in October. Victorian archaeologists interpreted the stone circle as representing a full sun and full moon.
