= Belstone =

Village in Devon, England

Coordinates: 50°43′N 3°57′W

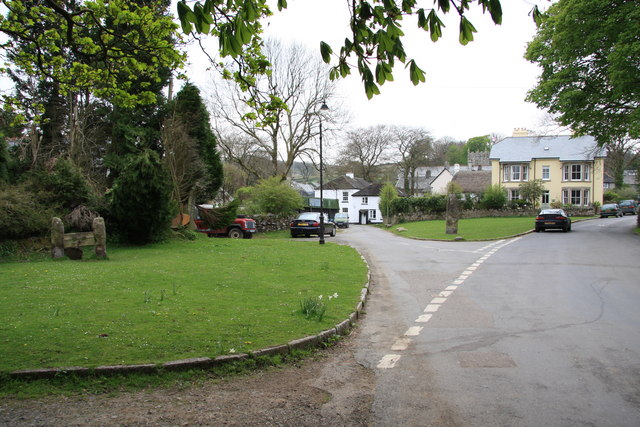
Belstone Village Green

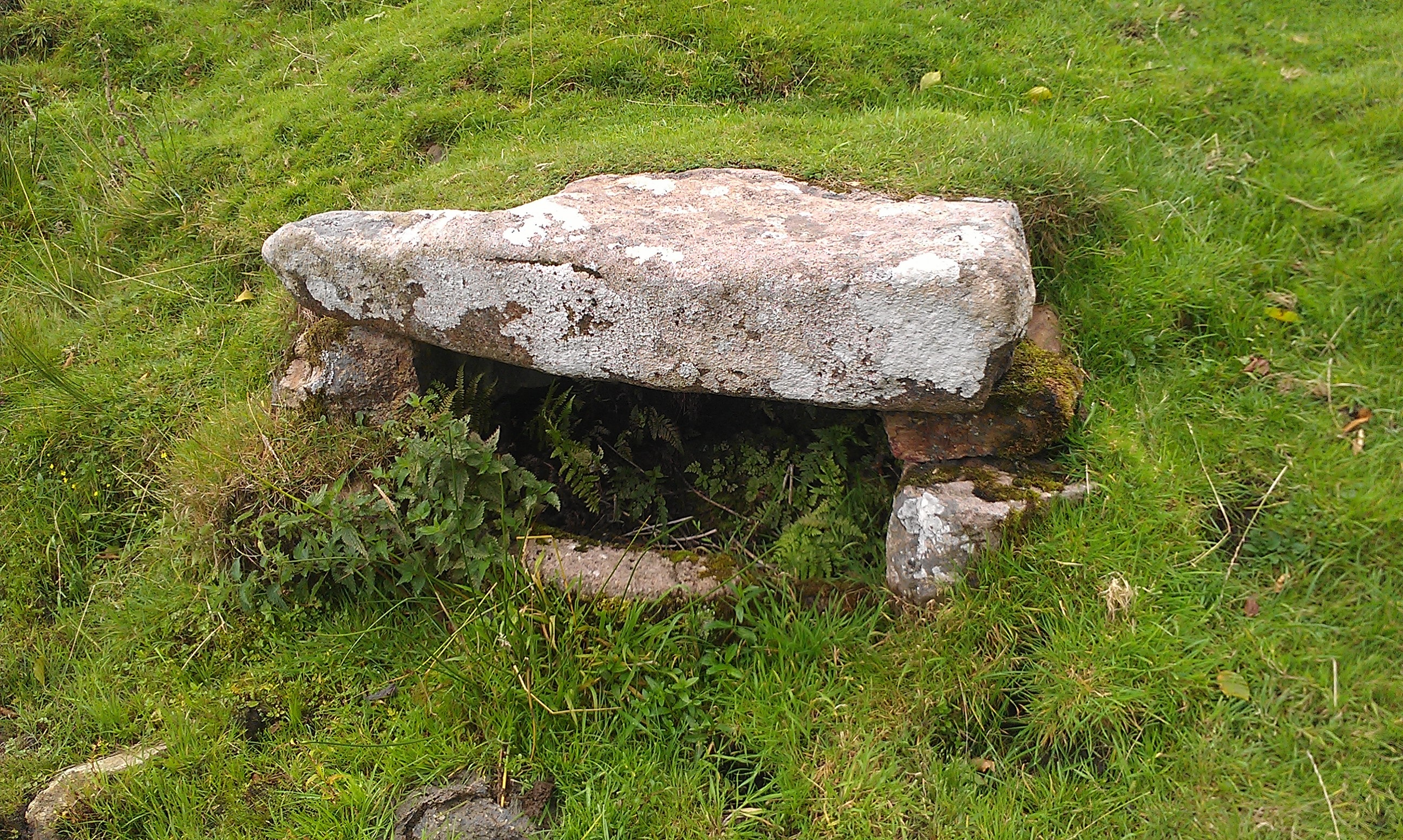
The holy well at Belstone

Belstone is a small village and civil parish in the West Devon District of Devon, England.

== Location ==
Lying on the northern side of Dartmoor, the western boundary of the parish is mostly formed by the East Okement River and the eastern by the River Taw. The village lies at around 300m (990 feet) above sea level with its highest point being Belstone Tor in the south, at 460m (1,508 feet). The village is central in its parish, surrounded clockwise from the north by the parishes of Sticklepath, South Tawton, Dartmoor Forest and Okehampton Hamlets. It is only accessible by minor roads from the A30 road, east of the town of Okehampton, which is about three miles to the north-west. In 2001 its population was 257, relatively unchanged from the 1901 figure of 236.

== History ==
There are a number of Bronze Age remains within the parish, including the Nine Maidens stone circle, the remains of the outer wall of a burial chamber. It is possible that Fatherford, in the north west of Belstone parish, was one stage in a Roman extension of the Fosse Way road from Exeter to Launceston.

The village was recorded as Bellestam in the 11th century Domesday Book. The parish church, dedicated to St. Mary, dates from the 13th century and has priests recorded from 1260.

In the 19th century, copper was worked on the moor at Taw River mine which closed in 1892, and at Greenhill in the north-east.

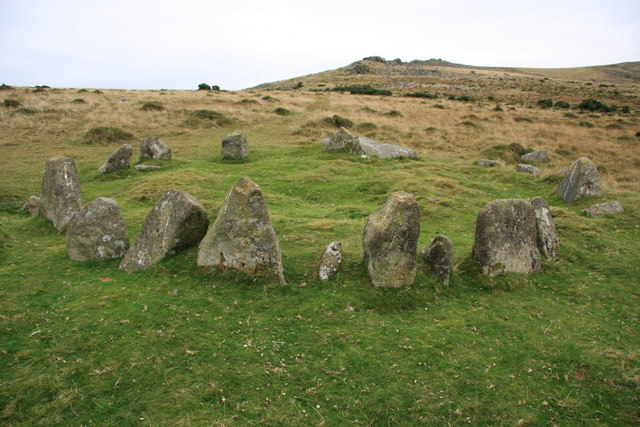
Nine Maidens stone circle

== Belstone in fiction ==
- Agatha Christie's 1931 novel The Sittaford Mystery would appear to use Belstone as the location of the fictional settlement of Sittaford.
- The story of The Ballad of the Belstone Fox (1970) by David Rook was based on the area, later made into a film The Belstone Fox in 1973.
- Michael Jecks made the village the setting for his 1999 novel Belladonna At Belstone.

== Gallery ==
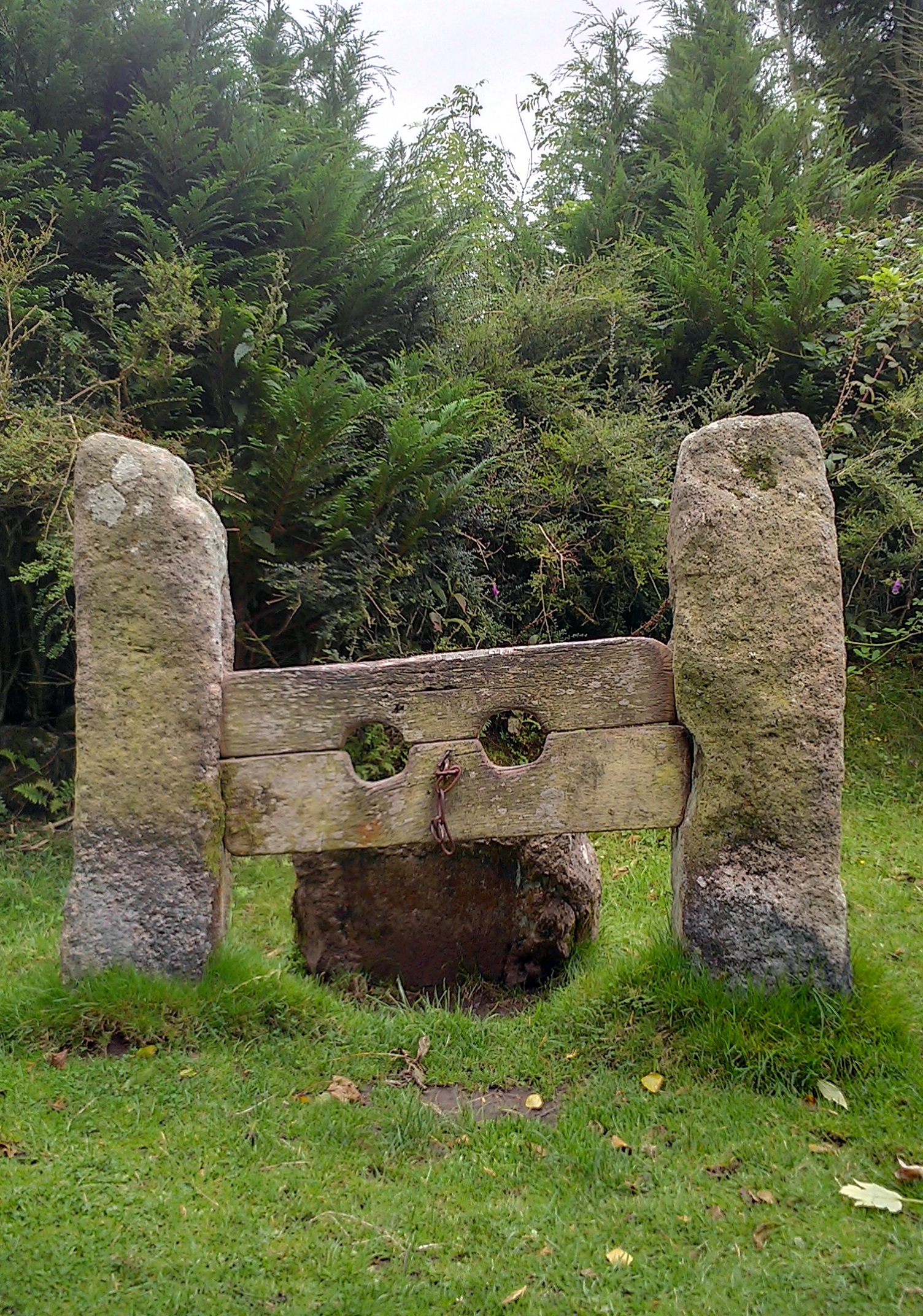
The Grade II listed stocks at Belstone

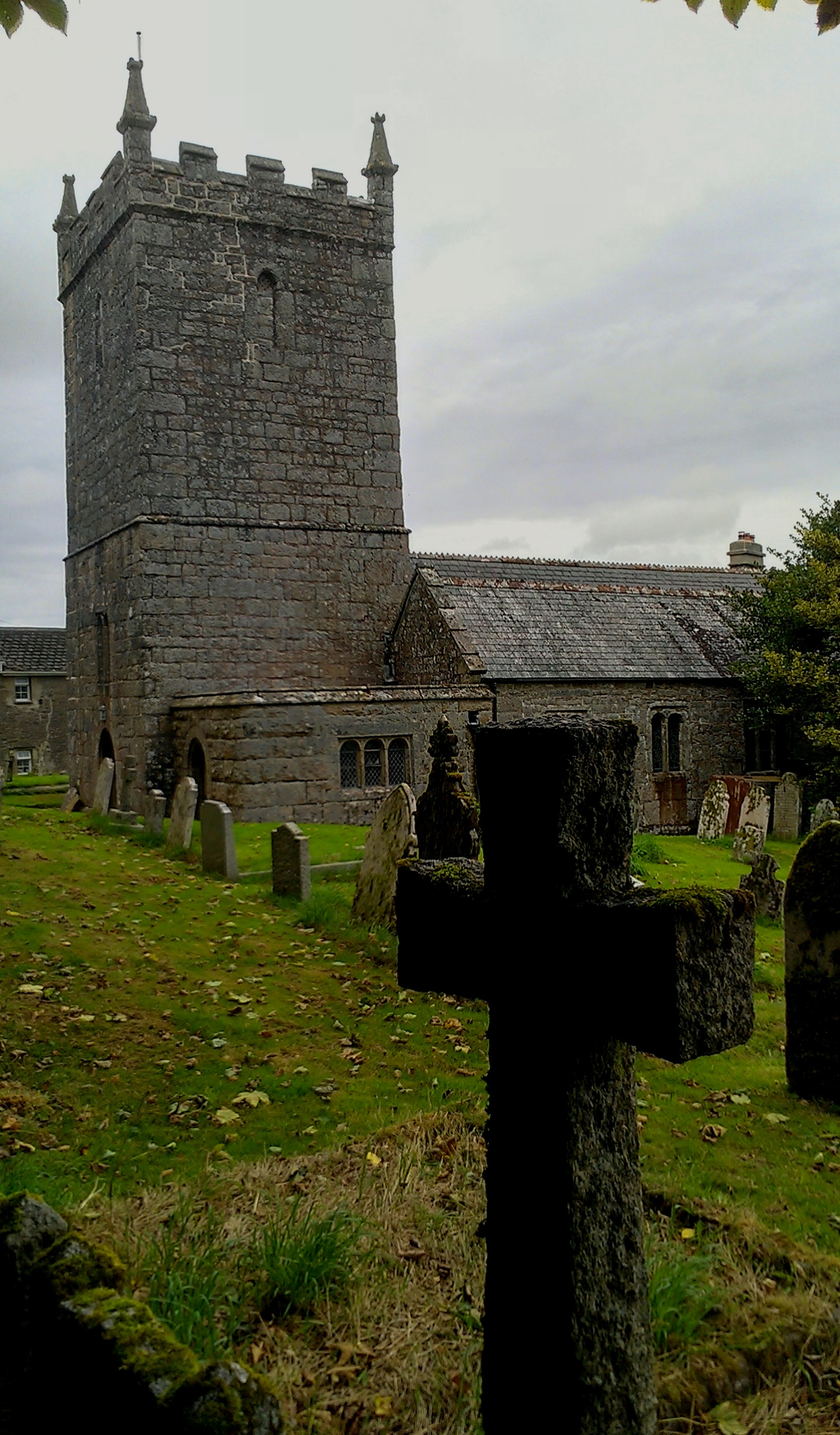
Church of St Mary the Virgin, Belstone

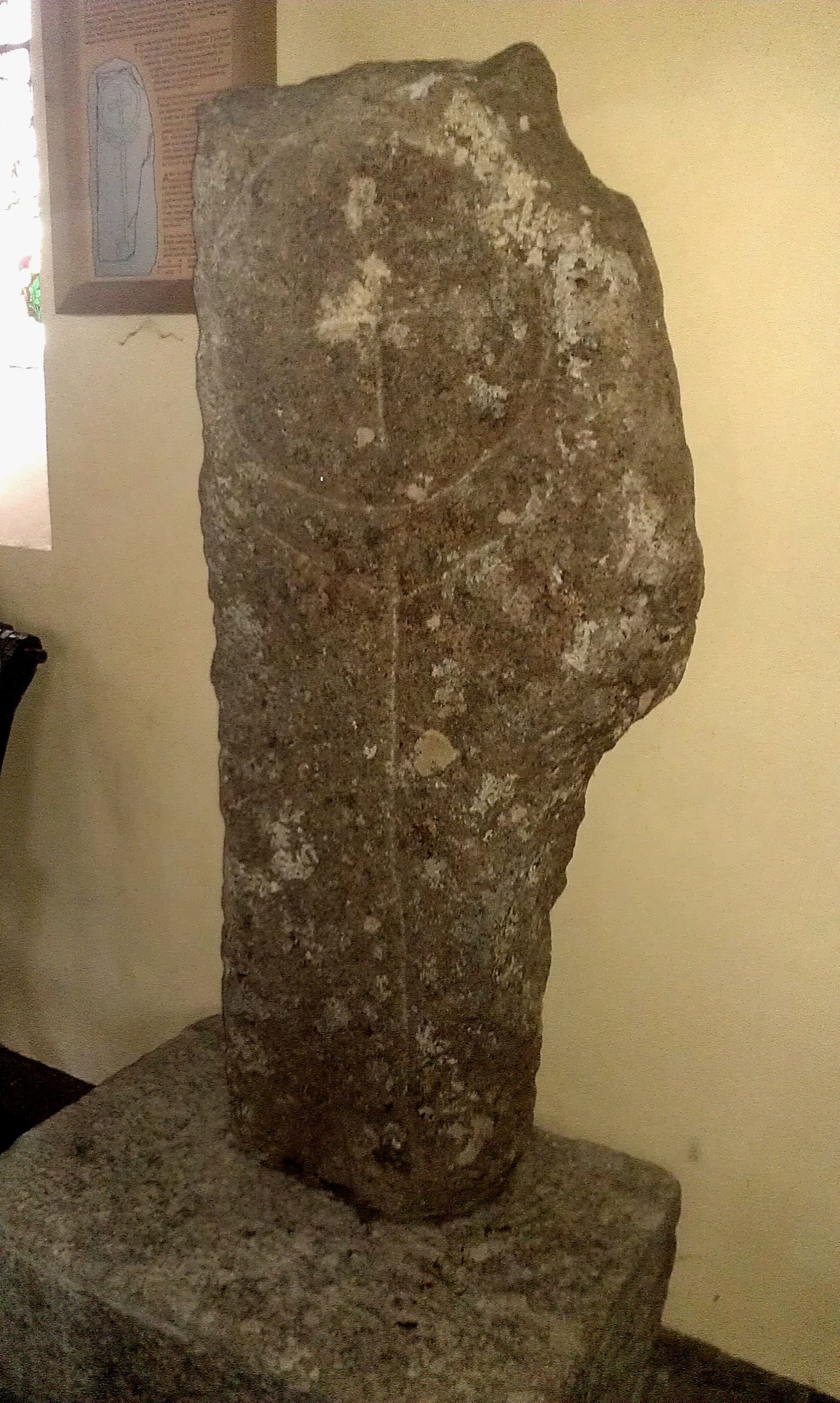
Early medieval ring-cross in Belstone's Church of St Mary the Virgin

== Sources ==
- The Book of Belstone by Chris and Marion Walpole, 2002
