= Cranmere Pool =

Coordinates: 50.65510°N 3.97624°W

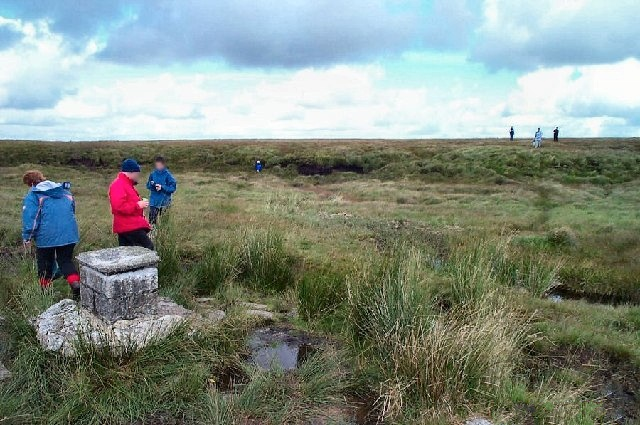
Cranmere Pool on a busy August Bank Holiday in 2004. The letterbox is clearly visible

Cranmere Pool is a small depression within a peat bog in the northern half of Dartmoor, Devon, England, at grid reference SX604858. It lies 560 metres (1,840 ft) above sea level on the western flank of Hangingstone Hill, close to the source of the West Okement River, about 500 metres (550 yd) north west of the source of the East Dart River, and about the same distance west of the River Taw's source.

== Location and history ==
The pool lies within the Okehampton Artillery Range, one of the Ministry of Defence ranges. A military access road which made it possible to drive to within 1 kilometre (0.62 mi) of the pool was closed for civilian use in 2010. Walking distance from the closest civilian road access is now about 5 kilometres (3.1 mi), from the north, at grid reference SX601911, at a starting height of 430 metres (1,410 ft) above sea level and using the existing military access road.

Cranmere Pool was once a permanent pool of water, but William Crossing, writing early in the 20th century, stated that it had been over a hundred years since this had been the case. The only time there is standing water today is after heavy rainfall.

Cranmere Pool is the location of the first letterbox. William Crossing relates in his Guide to Dartmoor that James Perrott, a well-known Dartmoor guide from Chagford, built a cairn in the pool and placed a bottle there for visitors' cards in 1854.

== Legends ==
Cranmere Pool is at the heart of several Dartmoor legends, the most common of which involve the former mayor of Okehampton, Benjamin Gayer or Gear who was actually mayor of the town five times during the 17th century and has a memorial in Okehampton church vestry.

In one version of the legend "Benjie Gear" was convicted of stealing sheep and as punishment was ordered to empty Cranmere Pool with a sieve. Being a resourceful person, he stole and killed another sheep and lined the sieve with its skin which allowed him to empty the pool so quickly that the town of Okehampton, in the valley below, was flooded. For this misdemeanour he was hanged on nearby Hangingstone Hill and his spirit was condemned to spin all the sand at the bottom of the now-empty pool into ropes. And since he has been unable to find any way of doing this, he is still there and can be heard on dark nights moaning and wailing about his never-ending task.

== In popular culture ==
In Ernest George Henham's 1906 novel A Pixy in Petticoats (London: Alston Rivers), Cranmere Pool and its famous letterbox play a vital part in the plot. It is a story of unrequited love between Beatrice Pentreath and John Burrough that occurs primarily in Dartmoor.

In August 2015 the pool was featured in BBC television's Edwardian Farm.
