= River Okement =

River in Devon, England

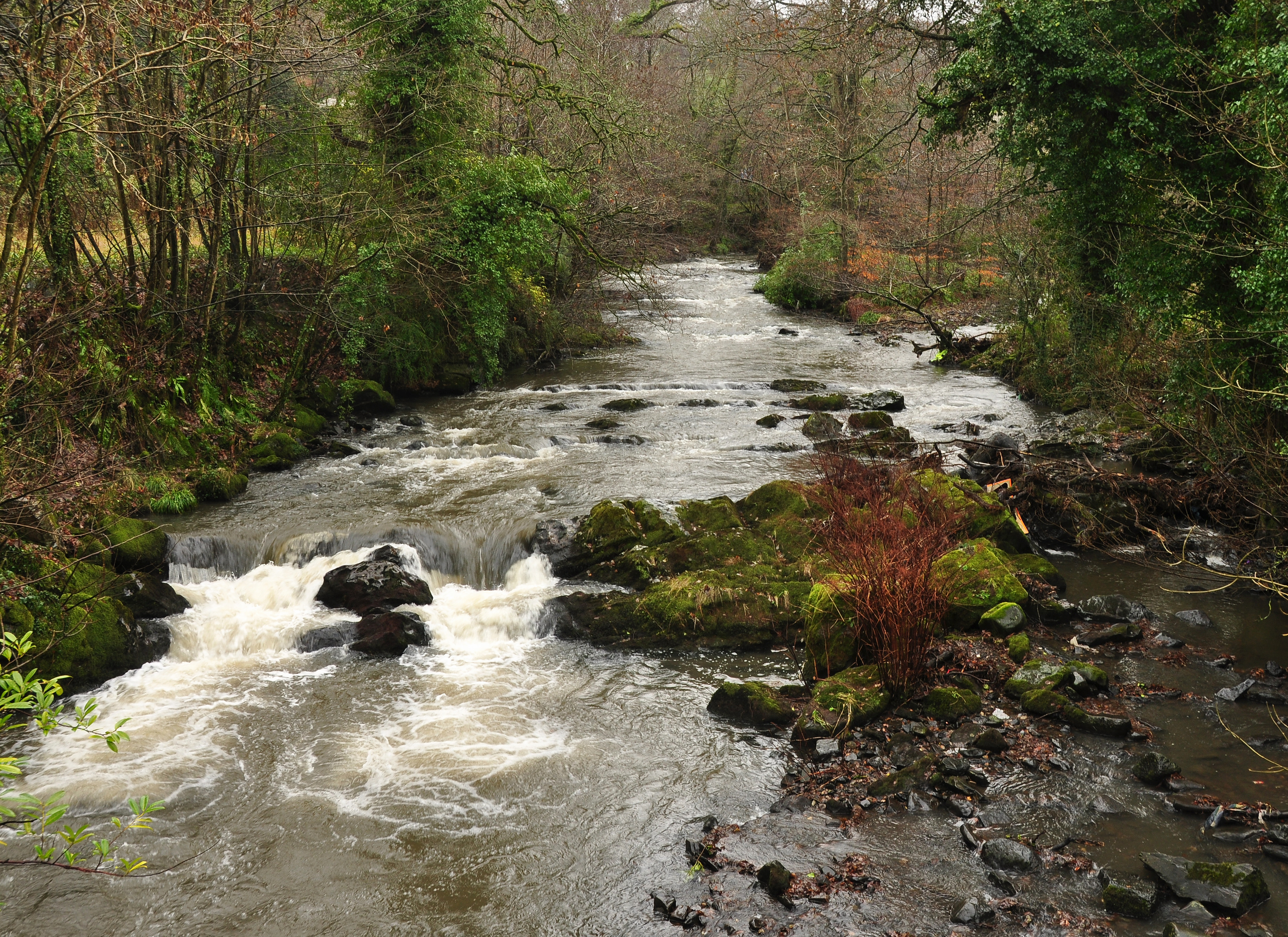
- River Okement downstream of Okehampton at Knowles Bridge

- Location within Devon Location within the United Kingdom

Location
- Country: England
- County: Devon

Physical characteristics
- Source
  - location: Dartmoor
- Mouth: River Torridge
  - location: Near Meeth
  - coordinates: 50°51′N 4°03′W

The River Okement is a tributary of the River Torridge in Devon, England. It rises at two places in Dartmoor, as the West Okement and the East Okement. These meet with other minor streams and join together at Okehampton. The river flows generally north, past the villages of Jacobstowe and Monkokehampton, and has its confluence with the River Torridge near Meeth.

== Toponymy ==
According to The Cambridge Dictionary of English Place-Names (2004) the derivation of the name is uncertain, but The Place-Names of Devon (1931) gave possible derivations from the Celtic word aku meaning "swift" for the first syllable, and for the second either Welsh myned meaning "to go" or an Aryan root mim, meaning "noisy". The name was first attested in 1244 as aqua de Okem; it appears as Okemund in 1281; and as Ockment flu by Saxton in 1577.

== Transport ==
The West Okement River is crossed by the Meldon Viaduct, built in 1874 as part of the London and South Western Railway.
