= Granite Way =

Rail trail in Devon, England

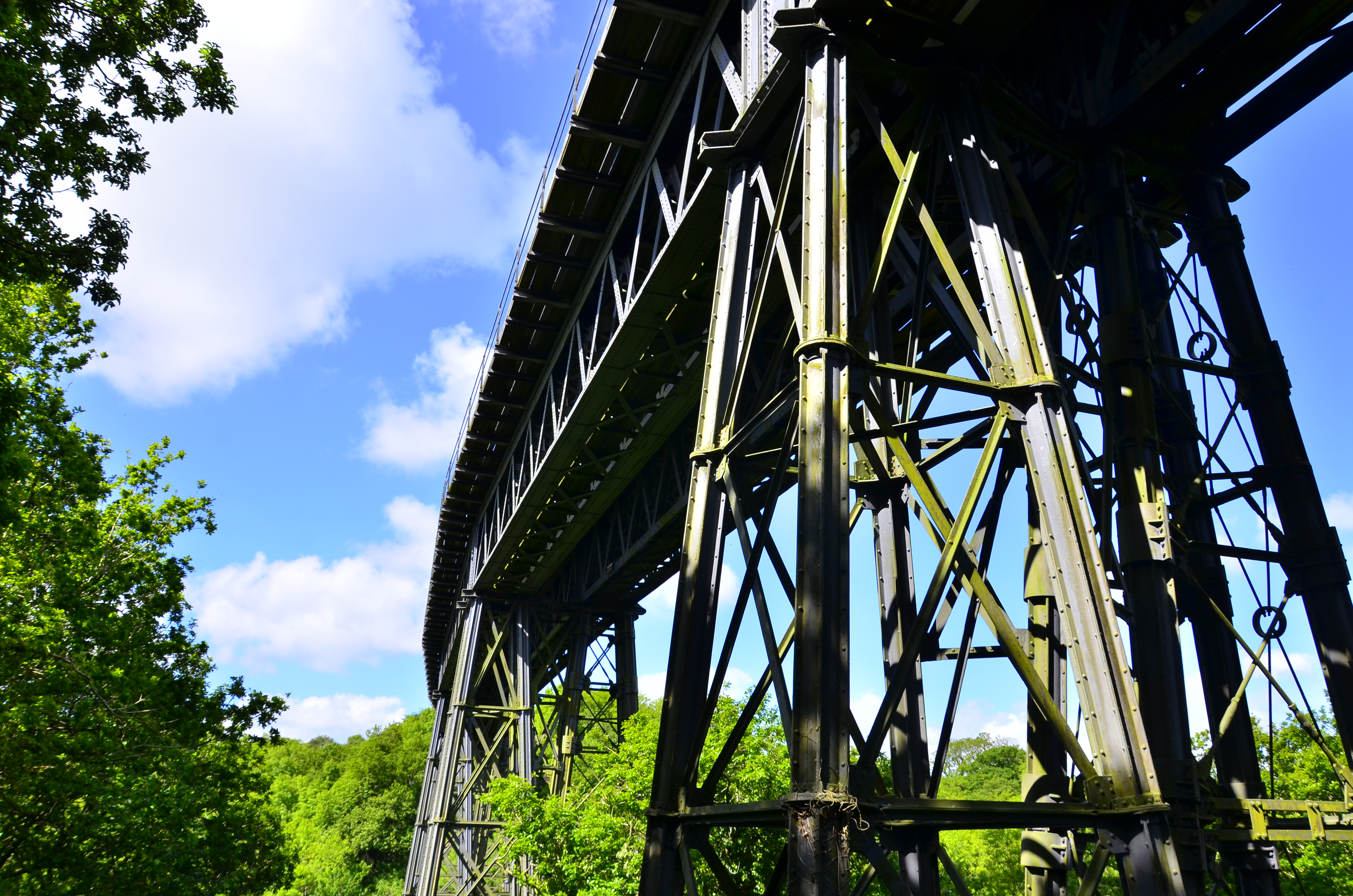
- The Meldon Viaduct is a scheduled monument and forms part of the trail, near to Okehampton
- Length: 11 mi (18 km)
- Location: Devon, England
- Designation: Rail trail
- Trailheads: Okehampton – Lydford
- Use: Walking; hiking; running; cycling; horse-riding
- Difficulty: Easy to moderate
- Season: All-year round

The Granite Way is a rail trail of 11 miles (17.7 km) between Okehampton and Lydford, in Devon, England; much of it lies within Dartmoor National Park. Formerly the route of the Devon and Cornwall Railway, the trackbed was converted to a shared-use path by Devon County Council and was opened in May 2002.

== Description ==
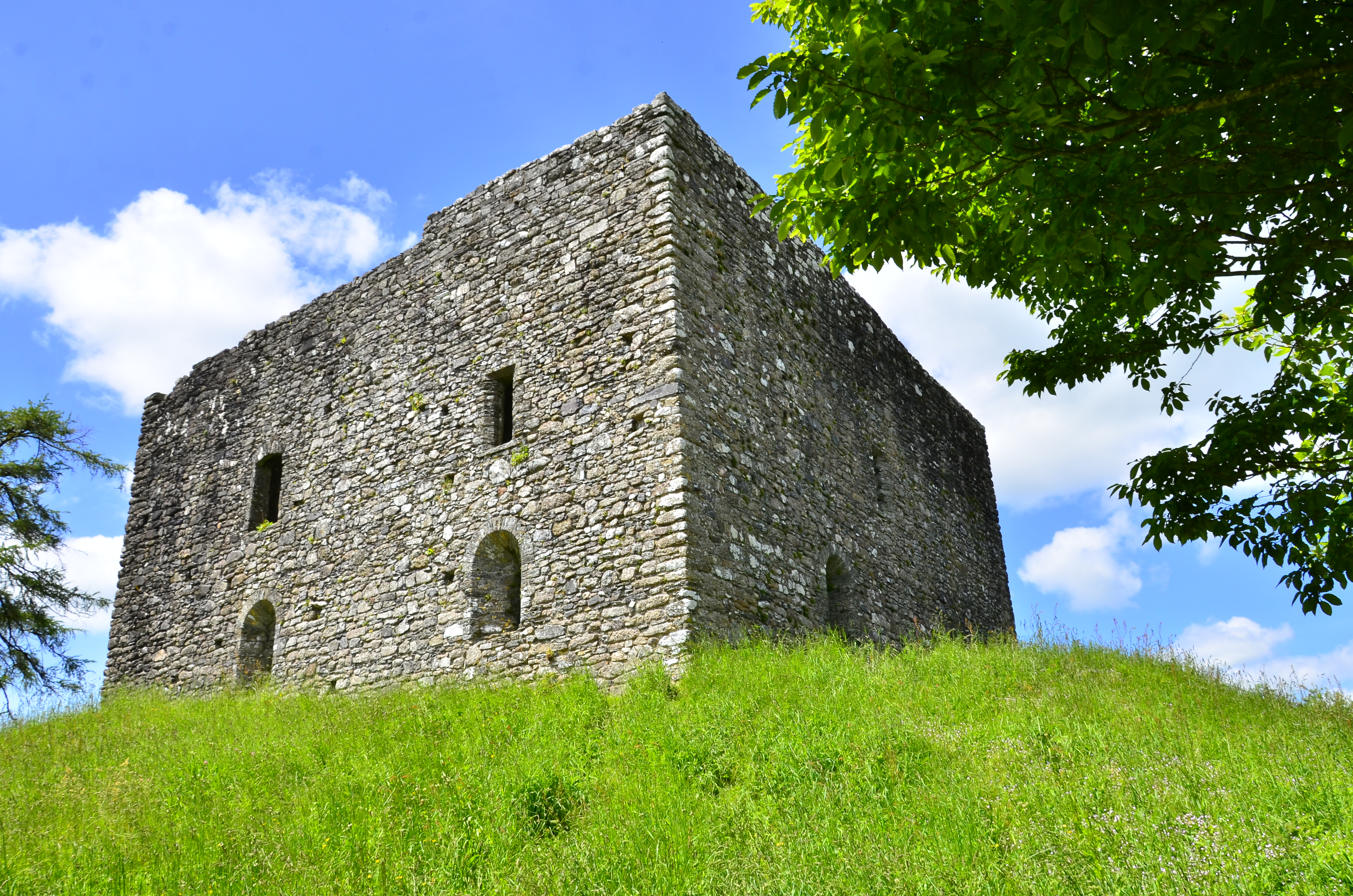
The south-west end of the Granite Way is near to Lydford Castle

The trail is maintained jointly by Devon County Council and Sustrans. It forms part of the National Cycle Network (NCN) Route 27 Devon Coast to Coast between Ilfracombe and Plymouth.

It is supported by services on the Dartmoor Line at Okehampton station, which provides generally hourly trains to nearby Exeter St Davids, operated by Great Western Railway.

The Granite Way was featured in The Guardian's 2016 article entitled Five of the best scenic bike rides in Devon.

== Route ==
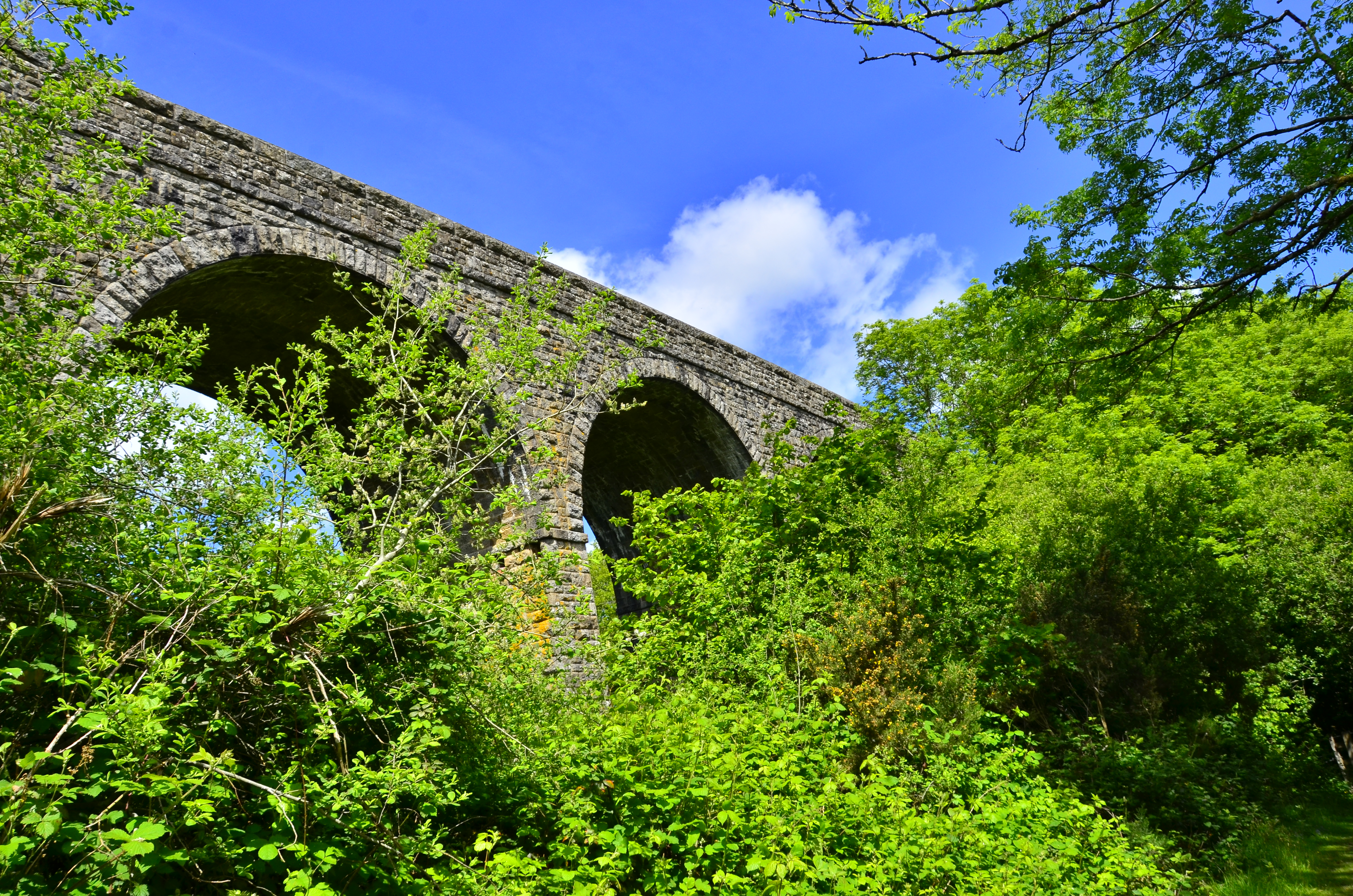
Lake Viaduct lies in the middle of the trail and was opened in 1874

The Granite Way largely follows the course of the former Devon and Cornwall Railway. It starts at Okehampton station and continues to Meldon Viaduct. It then follows quiet lanes to the former Bridestowe station and continues off-road for another 1.2 mi (2 km) to Lydford.

The route includes notable features, such as crossing the Meldon and Lake Viaducts, both of which were formerly railway bridges and are of historical interest.

== See also ==
- List of rail trails
