= Meldon Reservoir =

Reservoir in Devon, England

Coordinates: 50.703°N 4.040°W

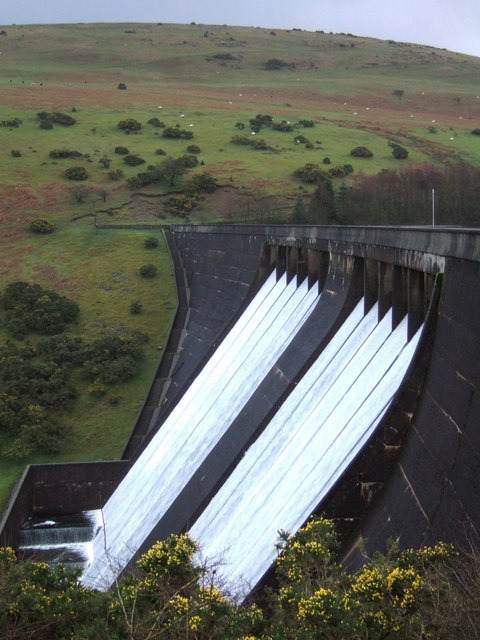
Meldon Dam – overflow

Meldon Reservoir is a man-made fresh water reservoir near Okehampton, Devon. The reservoir is the last of eight reservoirs to be constructed within the Dartmoor National Park.

The reservoir was built to dam the Meldon Gorge, through which the West Okement River flows, and supplies water to North Devon.

== History ==
=== Meldon Gorge ===
The Meldon Gorge is one of the most deeply incised glacial U-shaped valleys in North Dartmoor. The gorge was noted as having exceptional scenery and being a haven away from the military training areas of Dartmoor.

=== Early exploration ===
The North Devon Water Board was suffering from ongoing shortages of water, and was faced with rationing of supply. In the year prior to the completion of the reservoir, the board was considering emergency plans for extreme rationing.

The exploration of the Meldon Gorge started in the early 1960s, and in 1962 an application was made to sink trial boreholes. This was objected to and a public inquiry was held.

=== Objections ===
The plan for the reservoir was heavily contested by a range of bodies, including the Commons, Open Spaces and Footpaths Preservation Society, the Council for the Protection of Rural England, the Ramblers Association, the Youth Hostels Association, and the Dartmoor Preservation Association (and in particular DPA chairman Sylvia Sayer), as well as by the Dartmoor National Park Committee and the Duchy of Cornwall.

The objectors suggested an alternative site at Gorhuish, a few miles away, as an alternative. This alternate site was opposed because of its use as agricultural land, including by Baron Clifford of Chudleigh.

=== Approval and construction ===
An appeal was made to parliament at the behest of Lord Molson and the committee was chaired by David Ensor MP. The committee stated that Meldon was a viable project, although the alternative Gorhuish site might be preferred if its development prospects were proven.

Approval was given for construction of the dam and reservoir by parliament, against the objections of the numerous national and local groups.

Construction of the dam began in 1970, and involved the creation of a large compound and cableway to move the construction equipment. This was also objected to by groups concerned over the use of common land for the purpose.

During construction an 18-year old worker was seriously injured after falling into a 60 feet (18 m) pit and becoming impaled on an iron bar.

=== Opening ===
Following completion of the construction work, the valve was closed on the dam on 15 March 1972 to allow the reservoir to fill. The filled reservoir was formally opened by Peter Mills MP on 22 September 1972, and a plaque to commemorate this stands on the edge of the reservoir.

At the time of construction of the reservoir was estimated to be able to provide sufficient water for North Devon until the mid-1980's, but the 1976 drought caused the reservoir to be insufficient to meet demand.

== Dam engineering ==
The dam at Meldon is of a gravity dam construction, although the use of roller-compacted concrete was considered and dismissed during the planning phases.

The dam stands 55 metres (180 ft) tall and is 200 metres (660 ft) wide. There is a valve tower projecting from the upstream face to form the draw-off system, whilst the discharge uses sleeve-type submerged discharge pipes.

=== Power ===
The reservoir became the first water-supply body to produce electricity when a 500kW turbine generator was installed in 1987 to produce electricity to work the pumps and treatment works.

== Leisure use ==
Shortly after the opening of the reservoir, a car park for 107 cars was agreed by the River Authority pollution committee, at a cost of £9,000.

The reservoir is stocked with Brown trout for fishing.

In 1990, a circular walking route was opened around the reservoir, but there is no public right of way.

An open-water swimmer drowned in the reservoir in May 2024.
