= West Okement River =

River on Dartmoor in Devon, England

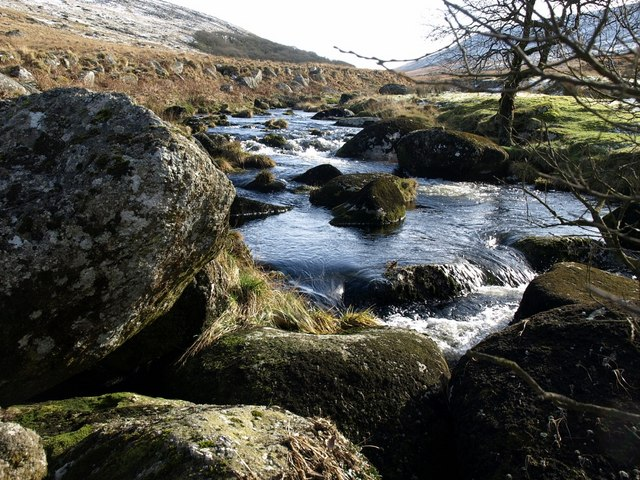
- The West Okement River

- Location within Devon Location within the United Kingdom

Location
- Country: England
- County: Devon

Physical characteristics
- Source: West Okement Head
  - location: Near Cranmere Pool
- Mouth: River Okement
  - location: Okehampton
  - coordinates: 50.794°N 4.022°W
- Length: 13 miles (21 km)

Basin features
- Waterbodies: Meldon Reservoir

The West Okement is a river in north Dartmoor in Devon in south-west England. It rises at West Okement Head near Cranmere Pool and flows in a generally NW direction past Black-a-Tor Copse and into Meldon Reservoir. After exiting the reservoir it flows in a generally northeast direction towards Okehampton, where it joins the East Okement River to form the River Okement. Its total length is roughly 13 miles (21 km). It is crossed by Meldon Viaduct.
