= Cut Hill =

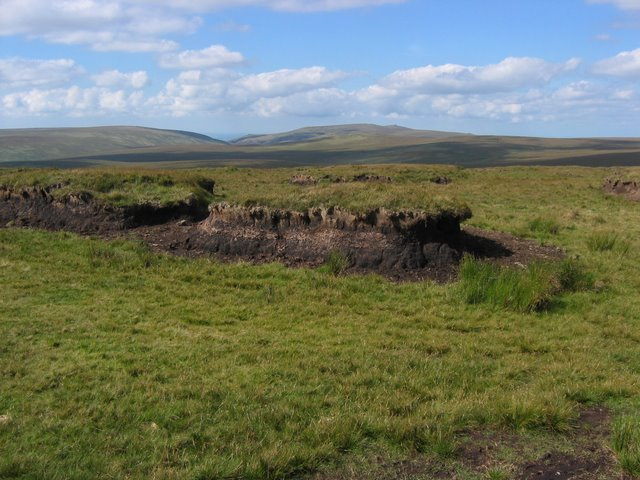
- Cut Hill

Highest point
- Elevation: 603 m (1,978 ft)
- Prominence: 90 m (300 ft)
- Parent peak: High Willhays
- Listing: Simm, Dewey, sub-HuMP, Tump
- Coordinates: 50°37′06″N 4°01′47″W

Geography
- Location: Devon, England
- Parent range: Dartmoor
- OS grid: SX598827
- Topo map: OS Landranger 191, Explorer 28N

Cut Hill is a hill in North Dartmoor in the southwest English county of Devon. At 603 metres high, it is the joint third highest peak in Devon and Dartmoor, together with Hangingstone Hill, which lies around 4 kilometres to the northeast.

The hill lies within the military training area on Dartmoor and is not accessible to the public except at certain times. It is one of Dartmoor's remoter spots and is a good hour and a half walk from Postbridge.

There are panoramic views from the top that are "among the best that Dartmoor offers." The hill is surrounded by wet and tussocky ground, and peat hags.

The name of the hill is derived from an old drover's track - Cut Lane - which cuts through the fen separating the Dart and Tavy valleys and used to facilitate the movement of livestock across the moor.

== Stone row ==
In 2004, a stone row was discovered at Cut Hill dating to 3,500 BC and shedding new light on an area where there had hitherto been no evidence of prehistoric life. There are nine granite stones oriented in a northeast to southwest direction as at Stonehenge and they have been described by archaeologist, Dr Tom Greeves, as "of worldwide significance."
