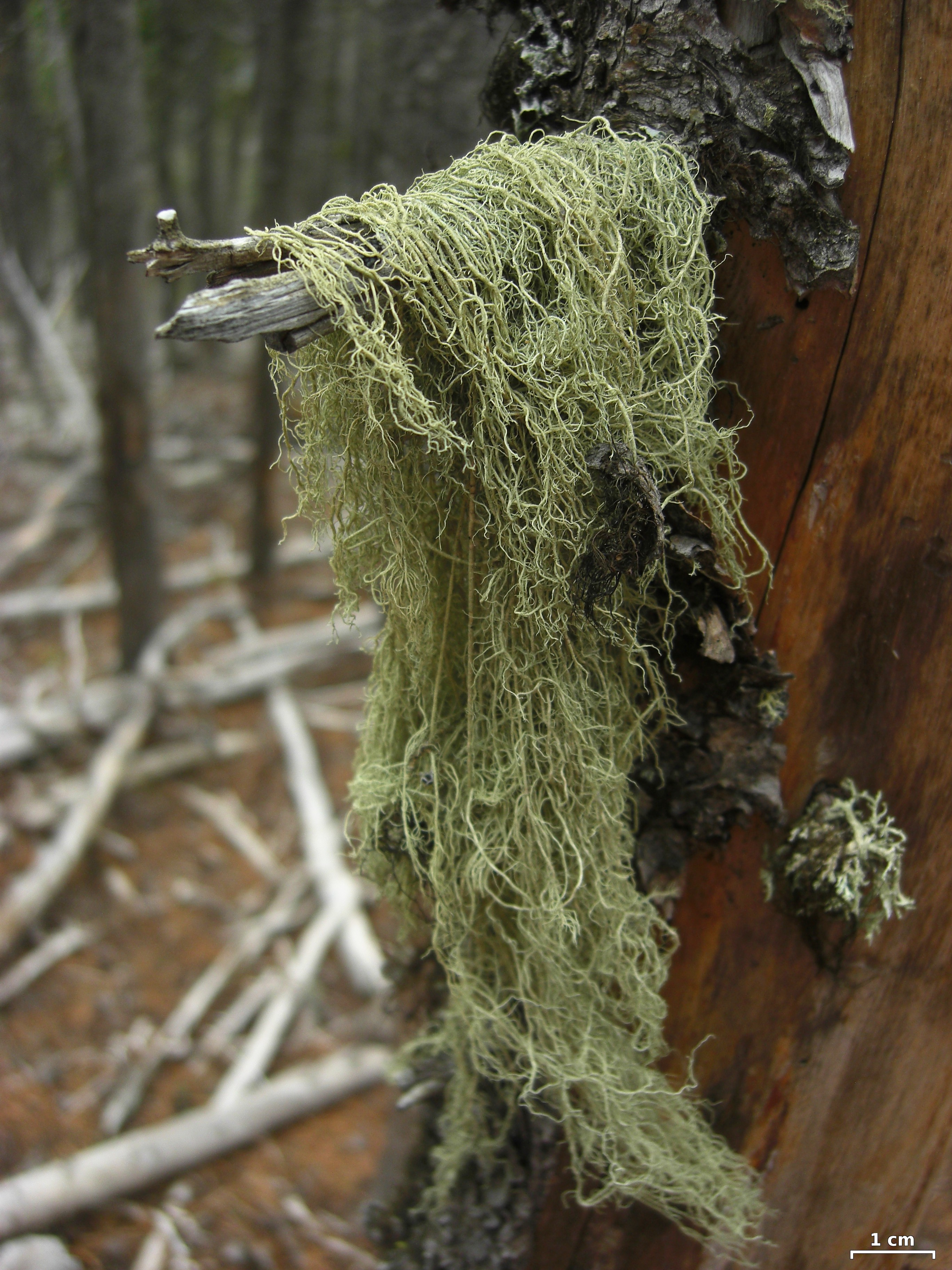
- In West Butte, Sweet Grass Hills, Montana, USA

Conservation status
- Secure (NatureServe)

Scientific classification
- Kingdom: Fungi
- Division: Ascomycota
- Class: Lecanoromycetes
- Order: Lecanorales
- Family: Parmeliaceae
- Genus: Usnea
- Species: U. scabrata

Binomial name
- Usnea scabrata Nyl. (1875)

= Usnea scabrata =

Species of lichen

Usnea scabrata, the straw beard lichen, is a pale grayish-yellowish green, slender, pendant, branching from the base, unequally branching, shrubby fruticose lichen that grows from holdfasts on trees. It is warty with abundant isidia. It resembles Usnea filipendula.

== See also ==
- List of Usnea species
