= Jacobstowe =

Village in Devon, England

Coordinates: 50.796667°N 4.006944°W

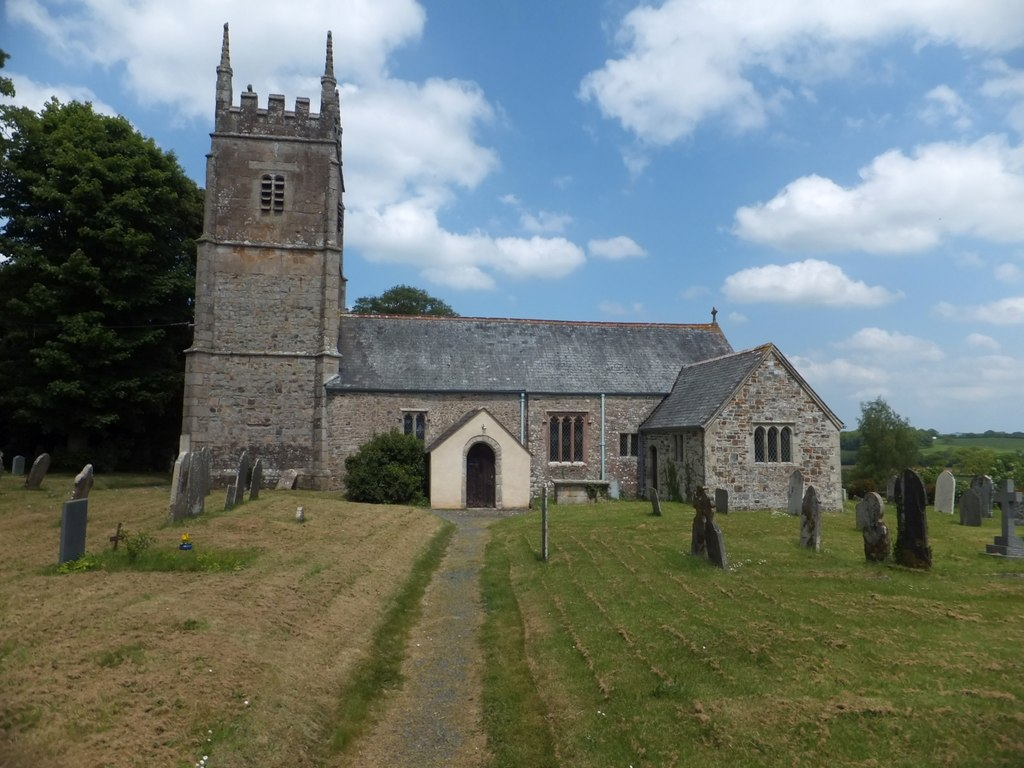
- St James' parish church

- Location within Devon
- Population: 522 (United Kingdom Census 2011]
- OS grid reference: SS5801
- Civil parish: Jacobstowe
- District: West Devon
- Shire county: Devon
- Region: South West
- Country: England
- Sovereign state: United Kingdom
- Post town: Okehampton
- Postcode district: EX20
- Dialling code: 01837
- Police: Devon and Cornwall
- Fire: Devon and Somerset
- Ambulance: South Western
- UK Parliament: Central Devon
- Website: Exbourne with Jacobstowe

Jacobstowe is a village and civil parish on the west bank of the River Okement, about 4 miles (6.4 km) north of Okehampton in the West Devon district of Devon, England.

The village is in the A3072 road that links Copplestone with Lamerton Cross, at the junction where it is joined by the B3216 road from Basset's Cross. National Cycle Route 27 and the Tarka Trail public footpath pass through the village.

The 2011 Census recorded the parish's population as 194.

There was never a pub here as many people believe.

== Parish church ==
The oldest parts of the Church of England parish church of St James date from the 12th century. The building was largely rebuilt in the 15th century, and restored in 1902–03. It is a Grade II* listed building.

The west tower has a ring of five bells. The fourth bell was cast in Exeter in about 1499. The Pennington family of bellfounders of Stoke Climsland, Cornwall cast the second bell in 1781 and the tenor in 1807. Llewellins and James of Bristol cast the third bell in 1884. John Taylor & Co of Loughborough cast the treble in 1904.
