= Dartmoor Training Area =

Military training area in Devon, England

Dartmoor Training Area (DTA)
- Dartmoor National Park, Devon
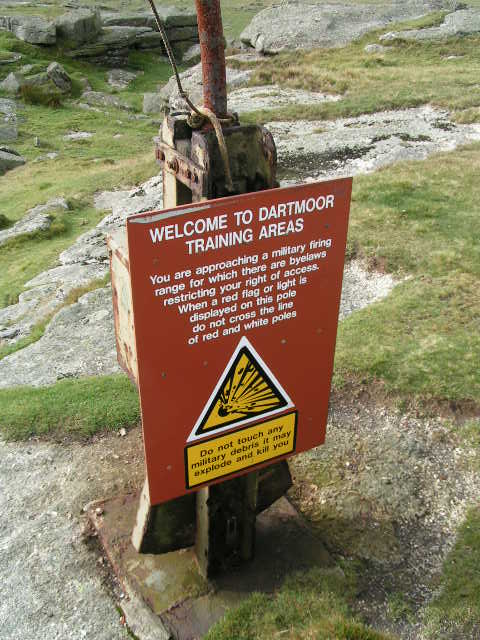
- MOD danger sign on Roos Tor

Site information
- Type: Training Area
- Owner: Ministry of Defence
- Operator: British Army
- Controlled by: Defence Infrastructure Organisation

Location
- Coordinates: 50.653347°N 3.994856°W

Site history
- Built: 1890s (permanent structures)
- Built for: War Office
- In use: 1870s-Present

The Dartmoor Training Area (DTA) is a military training area on Dartmoor in Devon in southwest England. The area consists of approximately 13,000 hectares (50 square miles) in the Dartmoor National Park.

== History ==
The British army has been using Dartmoor for training purposes since around 1800. After the opening of HMP Dartmoor in 1809, the battalion of soldiers guarding the around 5,000 prisoners there began practising musketry at a firing range at Hart Tor.

Over the next decades, troops stationed around Plymouth trained in the area, notably in 1853 before and during the Crimean War. In addition, the local Militia also kept in a high state of readiness, training on Dartmoor, often at Haytor.

In 1869, a new type of artillery munition developed by Henry Shrapnel was tested near Postbridge. Four years later, a major exercise was held by the First and Second Divisions, involving over 12,000 men and 2,100 horses, in the Ringmoor, Roborough and Yennadon Downs area. Rainstorms caused the training to be cut short.

During this time, the nation's main artillery training area was at Shoeburyness, where the guns fired out to sea. As technology advanced and ranges increased, this became inadequate. The War Office agreed with the Duchy of Cornwall and the town council of Okehampton to set up a training range in north Dartmoor. The first temporary camp was established in 1875 on Halstock Down and artillery firing between the East Okement and Taw Rivers lasted for three weeks. Flags identifying the affected areas were flown on Halstock Hill. Over the next years the number of field and horse artillery that came to the area steadily increased until training went on throughout the summer months. The Okehampton railway line established in 1871 facilitated access to the area. In the 1890s, a military stop was built just below Okehampton Camp.

Although the people of Okehampton appreciated the additional business brought by the troops, the graziers protested as the livestock was driven off. However, an agreement was reached and from 1882 compensation was paid to them.

Until the 1890s the soldiers and horses were quartered in tents built by the first troops to use the facility each year. Then the War Department took out a 999-year lease on 93 acres from the Okehampton Park Estate. Okehampton Artillery Practice Camp was built in 1892–4 at a cost of £13,469. Likely following the plan of the tented camp, the officer quarters were located on the high ground to the south. The stables could house up to 760 horses. The officers' stables still exist today and are used as troop accommodations. A guard house was built, not controlling access to the camp but overlooking the area where the guns were stored when not in use. Administration of the camp was by two NCOs called "Barracky Bills" who lived there with their families. Their quarters and working areas also still exist. A small permanent staff ran the training exercises. This camp accommodated two brigades at a time, of four batteries of six guns each. The troops (around 170 men and 90 horses per brigade) usually stayed at the camp for two weeks.

In 1895, an additional 10,000 acres of moor were leased from the Duchy of Cornwall. These areas were in use almost continuously from May to September. Remains of the targetry system then in use can still be seen in places around the moor. Access to the target area was by old miners' and peat cutters' tracks.

Even then, red flags were used to designate live firing. Livestock had to be cleared off the affected areas. At East Okement Farm, the inhabitants had to vacate their home during local training. Later a bunker was added for the family to take shelter in.

In the early 1900s, 3,448 acres of Willsworthy Manor and commoners' right were purchases by the War Office. In the 1920s this land was turned into rifle, grenade and field firing ranges and the core of a camp for the troops using these facilities.

In the 1930s training and building at Okehampton intensified. Among others, two decontamination centers were built (plus one in Castle Road, Okehampton) to deal with poison gas. As war with Germany became likelier, Territorial Army units were mobilized and the Devonshire Yeomanry finalized their training here.

After the start of the Second World War, almost the whole moor was requisitioned for military training. Another area of 11,000 acres south and south east of Hexworthy was used for rifle, machine gun and anti-tank firing. A new rifle range on Rippon Tor was built, an airfield constructed on Roborough Down and another camp of Nissen huts was started at Plasterdown (later to become a hospital for U.S. forces). In preparation against possible German invasion, protective structures were constructed in the moor, such as pillboxes. At one point an 18-inch railway gun was brought to the area and fired from Halwill Junction/North Tawton into Dartmoor.

In the year before the June 1944 invasion of Normandy, the 4th and 29th U.S. divisions trained on Dartmoor, with thousands of troops living in camps along the roads all across the moor.

At the end of the war, the War Office controlled around 78,000 acres of Dartmoor (through ownership, lease, license or requisition). Of these, 49,000 were barred to the public on a permanent basis. In July 1947, the report of the Hobhouse Committee on National Parks emphasized the special significance of Dartmoor and largely as a result by 1948 the military's land holdings were reduced to 37,400 acres, of which permanent closure affected 9,000 acres, 20,850 acres were closed during training exercises and 7,550 acres were accessible at all times. In 1951, Dartmoor National Park came into existence.

Although the Royal Artillery remained an important user of the facilities after the war the Royal Marines and especially their training centre at Lympstone became heavy users of the area around Merivale (a facility run by the Royal Navy). Mons and Eaton Hall Officer Cadet Training Units set up battle schools at Okehampton Camp.

Units, including some tanks, mobilised for the Suez Crisis in 1956 trained on Dartmoor, operating briefly in the Yes Tor area.

In 1963 the Dartmoor Preservation Association (DPA) published a 24-page booklet entitled Misuse of a National Park which includes photographs of unexploded shells lying on the open moor, corrugated iron buildings, large craters, a derelict tank used as a target, bullet marks on standing stones, etc. It also contains details of a 1958 incident in which a young boy was killed by a mortar shell near Cranmere Pool. Since the 1960s there has been much less military damage and litter mainly as a result of the DPA's campaigning.

Following the 1973 Defence Lands’ Review conducted by Lord Nugent, the Ministry of Defence's land holdings were further reduced to the current area of 32,559 acres. Along with this, most of the additional temporary buildings in Okehampton and Willsworthy Camps were removed, the camp at Plasterdown was demolished and the site restored to moorland. Rippon Tor firing range was closed.

In 1975/6, a local public inquiry by Lady Sharp into the continued use of Dartmoor by the military for training purposes found no viable alternative, but regular consultation between the Ministry of Defence, the National Park Authority and other interested parties was suggested. The "Dartmoor Steering Group" was set up. It meets once a year and reports to the Secretaries of State for Defence and Environment.

Eventually, Willsworthy Camp was moved to a lower profile location off the open moor and opened at the new location in 1995. It provides accommodation for 100 troops.

As of 2015 there are 120 conservation groups across the MOD, including Dartmoor Military Conservation Group.

== Training today ==
Military training is carried out on the ranges by the Royal Navy, Royal Marines, British Army, and Royal Air Force. The area is supported by two training camps, one at Okehampton and the other at Willsworthy, and there are three established firing ranges at Okehampton, Willsworthy and Merrivale. The area taken up with live firing ranges is 9,187 hectares (22,700 acres) and they are used on average 120 days each year. They are used for small arms, mortars and artillery smoke and illuminating shells. Live firing times are published 6 weeks in advance. The current leases run for many years, with Cramber Tor most recently being granted a further 40-year license.
