= Plymbridge Woods =

Woodland in Devon, England

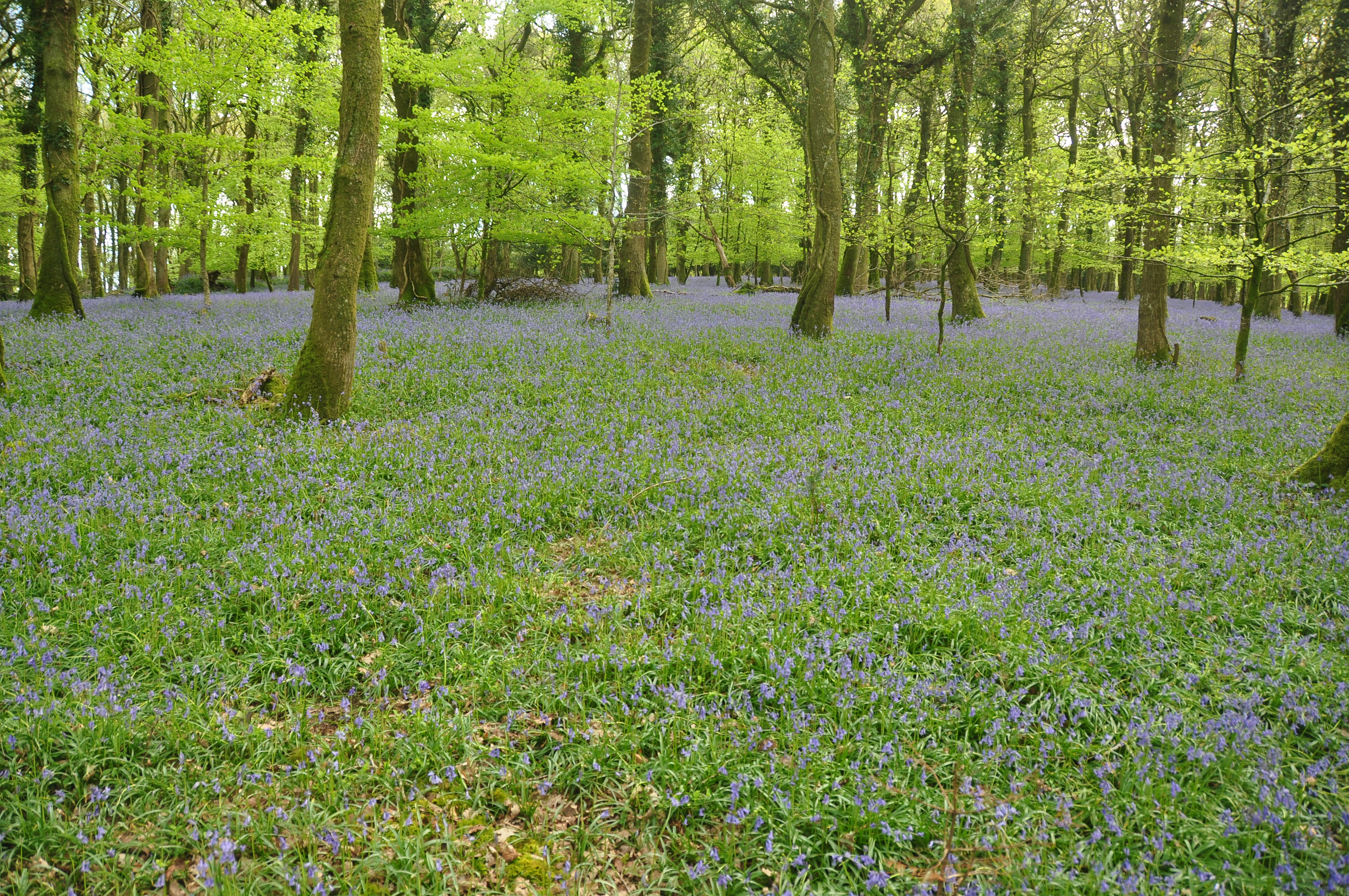
- Plymbridge Woods
- Interactive map of Plymbridge Woods
- Type: Woodland
- Location: Plympton, Devon, England
- Coordinates: 50.4088°N 4.0807°W
- Area: 49.56 ha (122.47 acres)
- Operator: The National Trust
- Open: All year
- Website: Official website

Plymbridge Woods is a woodland in Plympton, Devon, England managed by The National Trust. The woods are named after the historic Plymbridge, a Grade II listed bridge over the River Plym. Drake's Trail passes through the woods providing a cycling and walking route. There is a range of wildlife, birds and flora.

== History ==
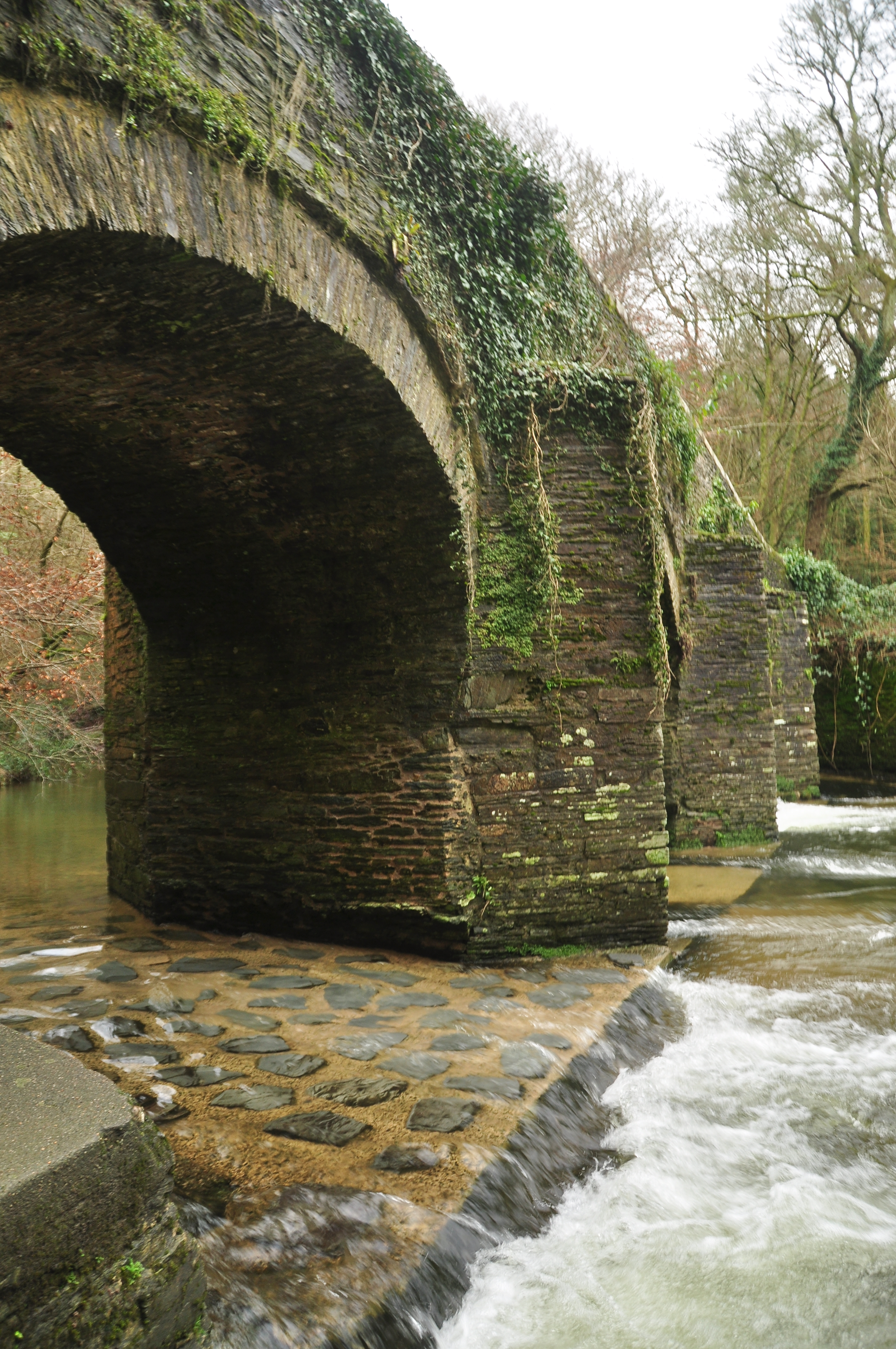
Plymbridge

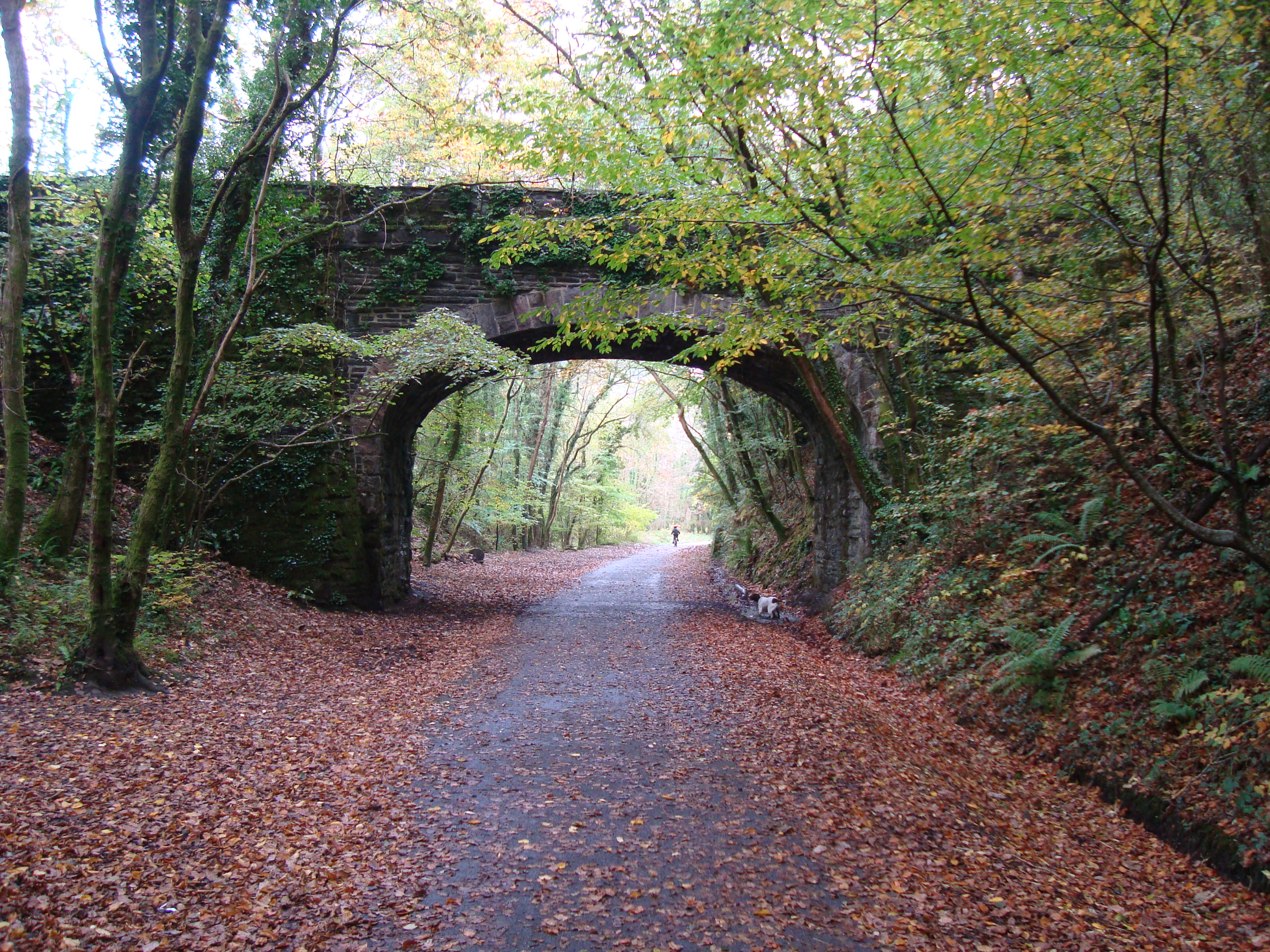
Drake's Trail

The woodland is named after Plymbridge a historic bridge over the River Plym which is Grade II listed with Historic England. A bridge has existed at this location from as early as 1238 with the current bridge being circa 18th century but seated on earlier piers. It is made from Killas rubble with five semi-circular arches having parapets with chamfered granite coping stones.

A number of tram and railway lines were constructed to transport granite and slate between Dartmoor and Plymouth. The last line to be built was the South Devon and Tavistock Railway upon which Isambard Kingdom Brunel worked. It was taken over by the Great Western Railway and closed in 1962. It is now called Drake's Trail and is used as a footpath and cycle route through the woodland. There are remains of the quarrying history including the shell of old buildings used by families involved in the industry. Most quarries in the area were used to mine slate, which was abundant. A section of the trail passes Cann Viaduct.

== Nature ==
The site is home to many species typical of English woodland, including a herd of fallow deer. There are goosanders, mandarin ducks, kingfishers and dippers along the river. Peregrine falcons have nested in Cann Quarry since the 1960s and since 2002 the National Trust have maintained a watchpoint, staffed by volunteers, on Cann Viaduct from which it is usually possible to see the nest site. The site supports damselflies and butterflies.

== Recreation ==
The woods are used for walking, cycling, dog walking and viewing the natural flora and fauna. Plymvalley Parkrun takes place in the woods starting at Plymbridge. The National Trust has a permanent orienteering course and a mountain bike trail in the woods and the Devon Coast to Coast Cycle Route runs through the woods.
