= Devon Coast to Coast Cycle Route =

English cycling route

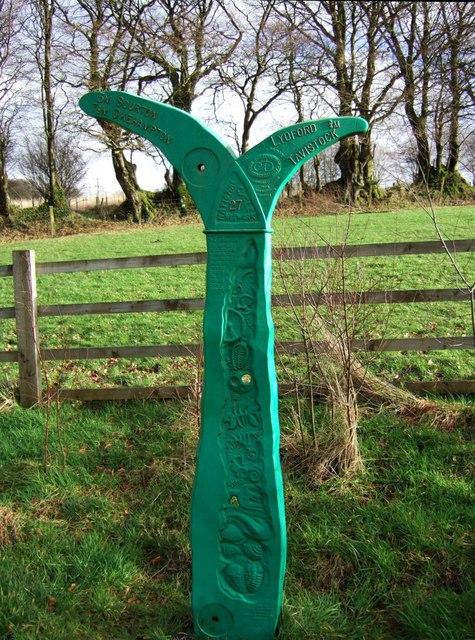
- NCN sign on the Granite Way
- Length: 99 mi (159 km)
- Location: Devon
- Designation: National Cycle Route 27
- Trailheads: Ilfracombe; Plymouth
- Difficulty: Moderate to difficult

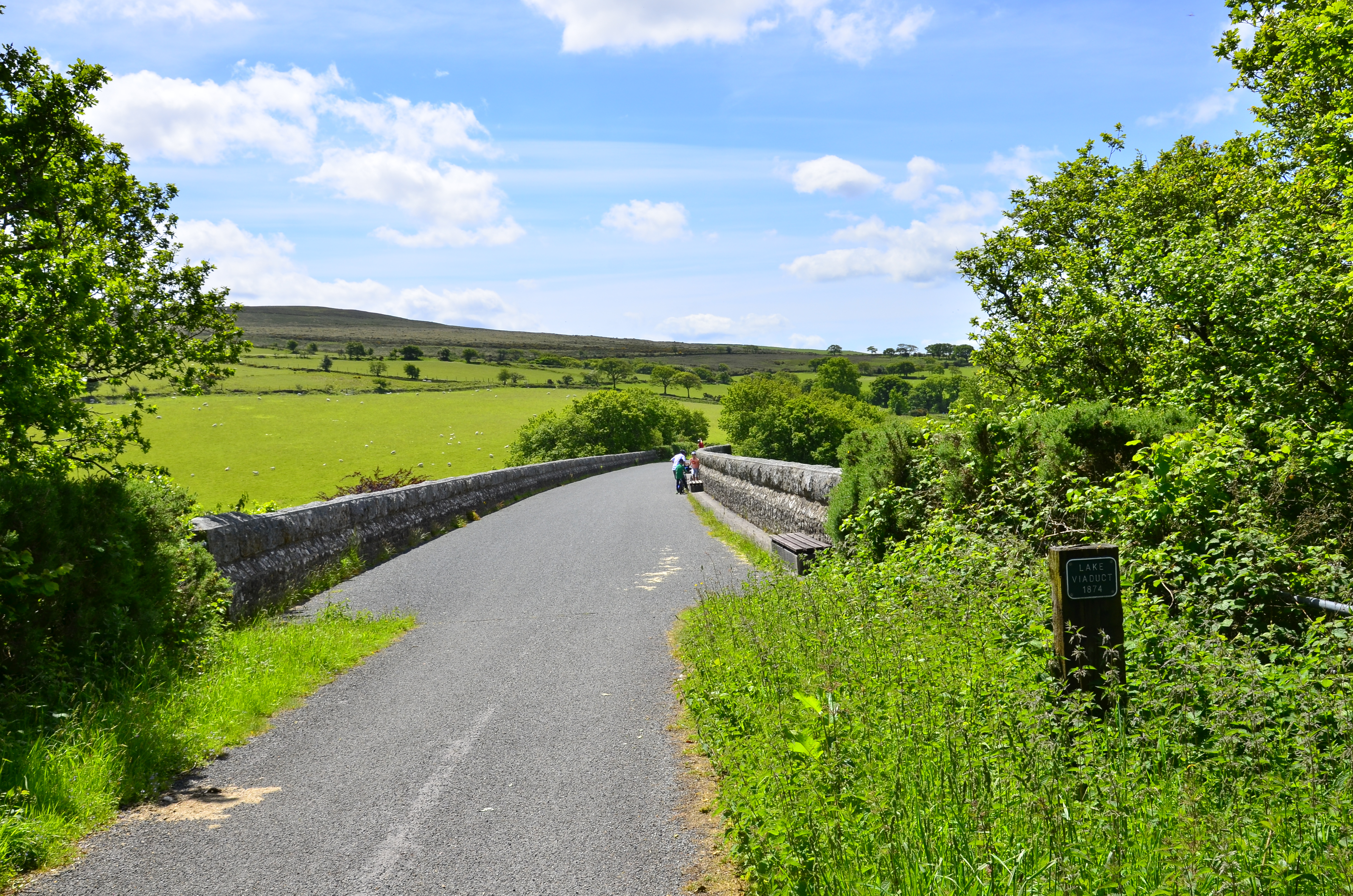
Lake Viaduct is one of the parts of National Cycle Route 27 with heritage dating back to the nineteenth century. It is in the middle section of The Granite Way.

The Devon Coast to Coast Cycle Route is a 99-mile waymarked route from Ilfracombe in north Devon to Plymouth in south Devon. It skirts the National Parks of both Exmoor and Dartmoor and incorporates part of the Tarka Trail in the north, The Granite Way from Okehampton to Lydford and Drake's Trail from Tavistock to Plymouth.

Created by Sustrans, the sustainable travel charity, the cycleway runs for over half its length on off-road routes along disused railway lines. The route is part of the National Cycle Network and is designated National Cycle Route 27. It includes the Tarka Trail, the Granite Way and Drake's Trail, all off-road, plus generally quiet country lanes and bridleways. 71 miles (114 km) of the route are designated traffic-free, with at least one section between Braunton and Meeth being 30 miles (48 km) long.

Towns that can be visited along the way include Tavistock, Okehampton, Bideford and Barnstaple.

The route is normally cycled in two or three days.

== Route ==
- Section 1: Ilfracombe to Bideford. Distance: 26 miles (42 km) - the section between Ilfracombe and Barnstaple follows the route of the former railway between Ilfracombe and the former Woolacombe & Mortehoe railway station and again between Braunton and Barnstaple train station. 14 miles (23 km).
- Section 2: Bideford to Okehampton. Distance: 32 miles (51 km)
- Section 3: Okehampton to Tavistock. Distance: 21 miles (34 km)
- Section 4: Tavistock to Plymouth. Distance: 20 miles (32 km) - Drake's Trail. This section follows the route of the former South Devon and Tavistock Railway and incorporates Plymbridge Woods

Distances are approximate.
