= Hangingstone Hill =

Hill on Dartmoor in Devon, England

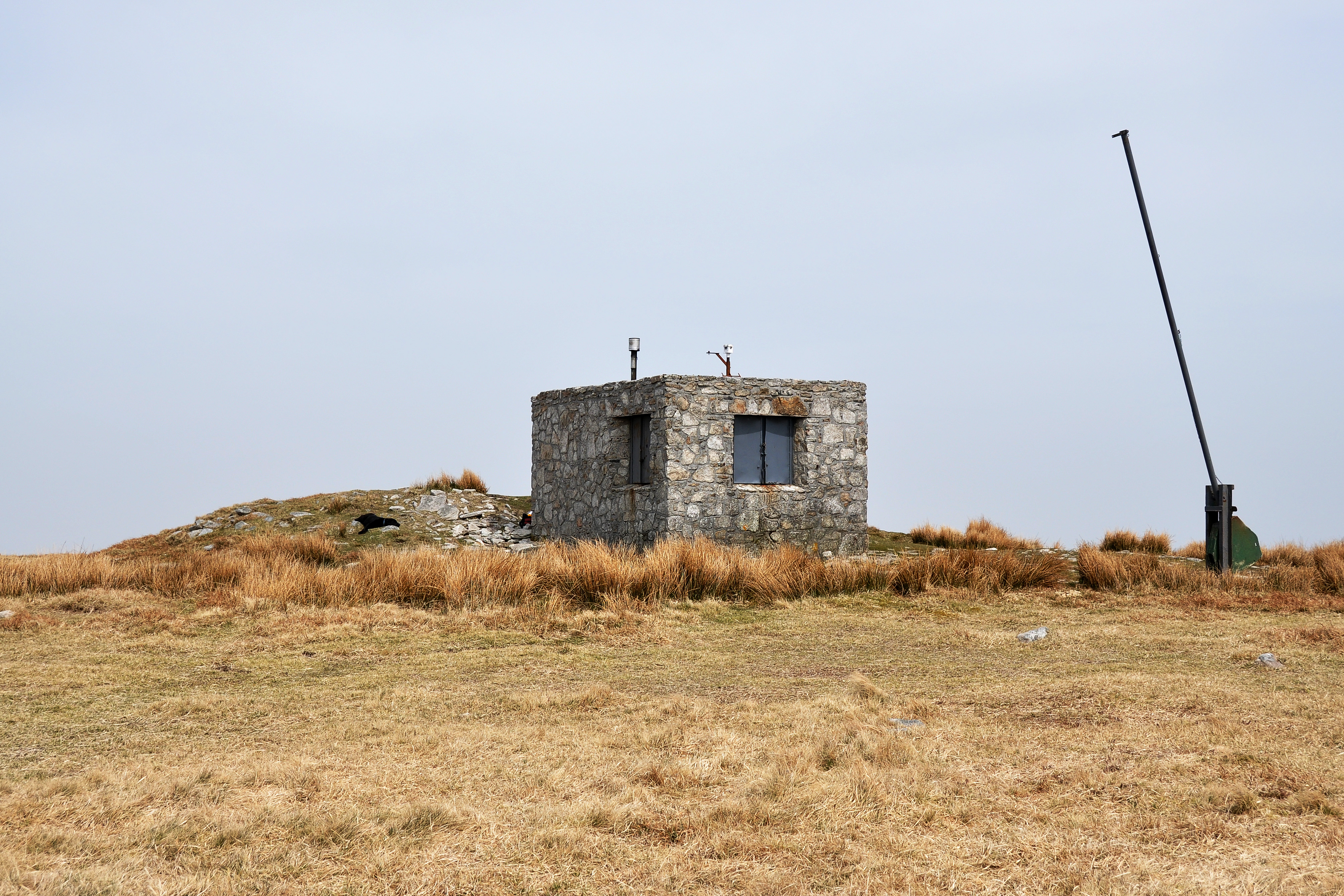
- Military hut and flagpole at the summit of Hangingstone Hill

Highest point
- Elevation: 603 m (1,978 ft)
- Prominence: 48 m (157 ft)
- Parent peak: High Willhays
- Listing: Simm, Dewey, Tump
- Coordinates: 50°39′31″N 3°57′24″W

Geography
- Location: Devon, England
- Parent range: Dartmoor
- OS grid: SX617861
- Topo map: OS Landranger 191, Explorer 28N

Hangingstone Hill is a hill in North Dartmoor in the southwest English county of Devon. At 603 metres high, it is the joint third highest peak in Devon and Dartmoor, together with Cut Hill, which lies around 4 kilometres to the southwest.

The hill lies within the military training area on Dartmoor and is not accessible to the public except at certain times. There is a military road to the summit, which is marked by an Army observation post and flagpole. On clear days, the views are "superb", extending to Exmoor, the Quantocks, the River Teign estuary, and many of Dartmoor's peaks.

The name of the hill is derived from a logan rock on the northwest hillside which no longer rocks, however. It was formerly known as Newtake Hill.

Hangingstone is one of Dartmoor's thirteen Deweys and the tenth highest in England.

About 600 metres almost due south is the summit of Whitehorse Hill which is a subpeak or twin peak of Hangingstone Hill. It has a drop of less than 10m.
