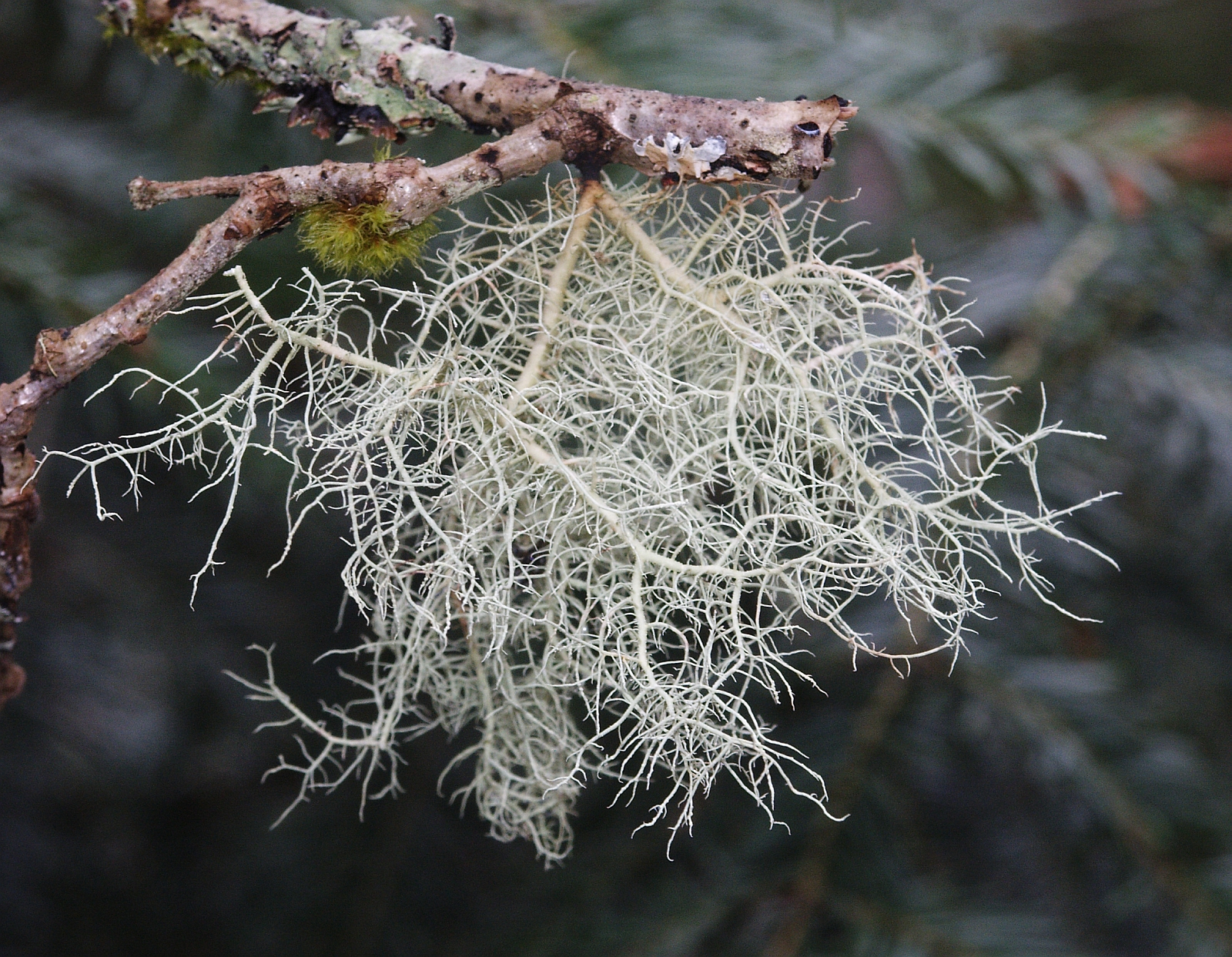

Scientific classification
- Domain: Eukaryota
- Kingdom: Fungi
- Division: Ascomycota
- Class: Lecanoromycetes
- Order: Lecanorales
- Family: Parmeliaceae
- Genus: Usnea
- Species: U. filipendula

Binomial name
- Usnea filipendula Stirt. (1881)

Synonyms
- Usnea dasopoga var. fibrillosa (Motyka) Keissl. (1960); Usnea fibrillosa Motyka (1936); Usnea muricata Motyka (1936)

= Usnea filipendula =

Species of lichen

Usnea filipendula, the fishbone beard lichen, is a pale gray-green fruticose lichen with a pendant growth form, growing in up to 20 cm many-branching tassels hanging from the bark of trees. In California, it mostly grows on mostly conifer in the Coast Range, but also in the western slopes of the Sierra Nevada range. It lacks apothecia. It is similar to Usnea scabrata, but is darker, has a thicker cortex, and different chemistry. Lichen spot tests are K+ red, KC−, C−, and P+ yellow.

== See also ==
- List of Usnea species
