= East Okement River =

River in Devon, England

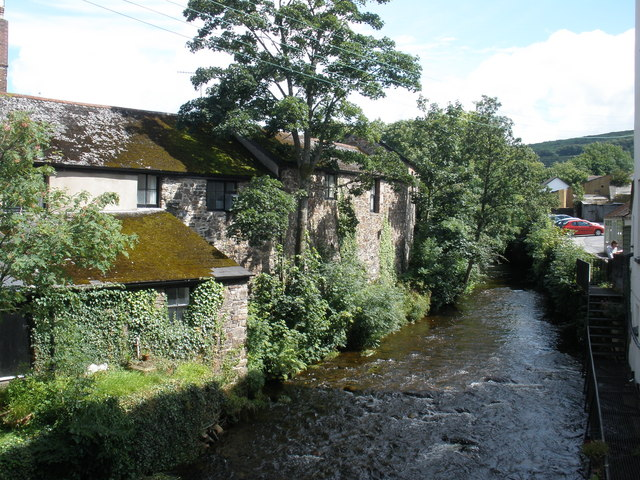
- The East Okement in Okehampton

- Location within Devon Location within the United Kingdom

Location
- Country: England
- County: Devon

Physical characteristics
- Mouth: River Okement
  - location: Okehampton
  - coordinates: 50.7421°N 4.0027°W

The East Okement is a river in the Dartmoor moors in Devon in south-west England. It joins the West Okement at Okehampton to form the Okement.
