= Okehampton =

Town in Devon, England

Coordinates: 50.7388°N 4.0041°W

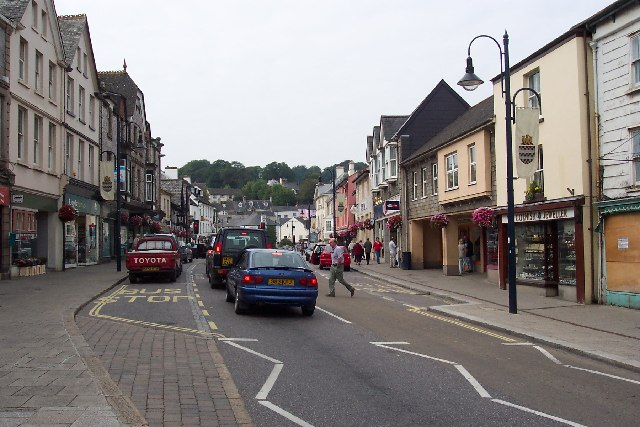
- Oakhampton town centre

- Coat of Arms

- Location within Devon
- Interactive map showing the parish boundary
- Population: 7,309 (2021 census)
- OS grid reference: SX5895
  - London: 201 miles (323 km)
- Civil parish: Okehampton
- District: West Devon
- Shire county: Devon
- Region: South West
- Country: England
- Sovereign state: United Kingdom
- Post town: Okehampton
- Postcode district: EX20
- Dialling code: 01837
- Police: Devon and Cornwall
- Fire: Devon and Somerset
- Ambulance: South Western
- UK Parliament: Central Devon
- Website: Official Town Website

Okehampton (/ˌoʊkˈhæmptən/ or /ˈoʊkæmptən/) is a town and civil parish in West Devon in the English county of Devon. Okehampton is situated at the northern edge of Dartmoor 21 miles (34 km) west of Exeter, 26 miles (42 km) north of Plymouth and 24 miles (39 km) south of Barnstaple. It had a population of 7,309 at the 2021 census.

== Toponymy ==
The name means settlement or estate (Old English: tun) on the River Okement. This is shown by early forms of the name, such as Ochementone as recorded in the Domesday Book of 1086, and Okementon(a) in 1167 and 1275. The name was later associated with the common suffix -hampton, but as late as the 1930s the original name was remembered by the pronunciation "Okington" or "Okenton" still used by old people in the district.

== History ==
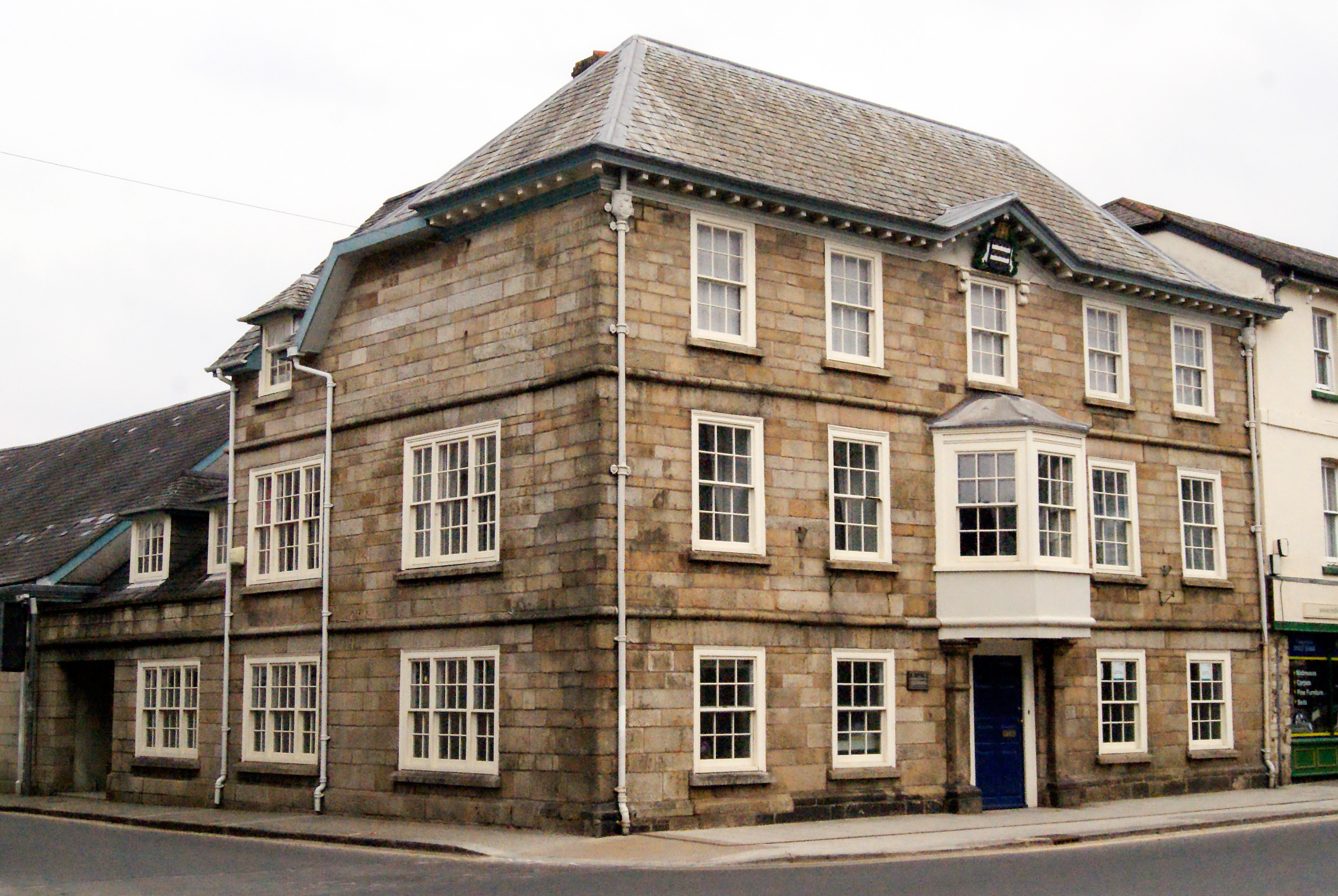
Okehampton Town Hall

Okehampton was founded by the Saxons. The earliest written record of the settlement is from 980 AD as Ocmundtune, meaning settlement by the Ockment, a river which runs through the town. It was recorded as a place for slaves to be freed at cross roads.

Like many towns in the West Country, Okehampton grew on the medieval wool trade. Notable buildings in the town include the 15th century chapel of St. James and Okehampton Castle, which was established by the Norman Sheriff of Devon, Baldwin FitzGilbert (d.1090), and the 17th century Okehampton Town Hall.

=== Feudal barony ===
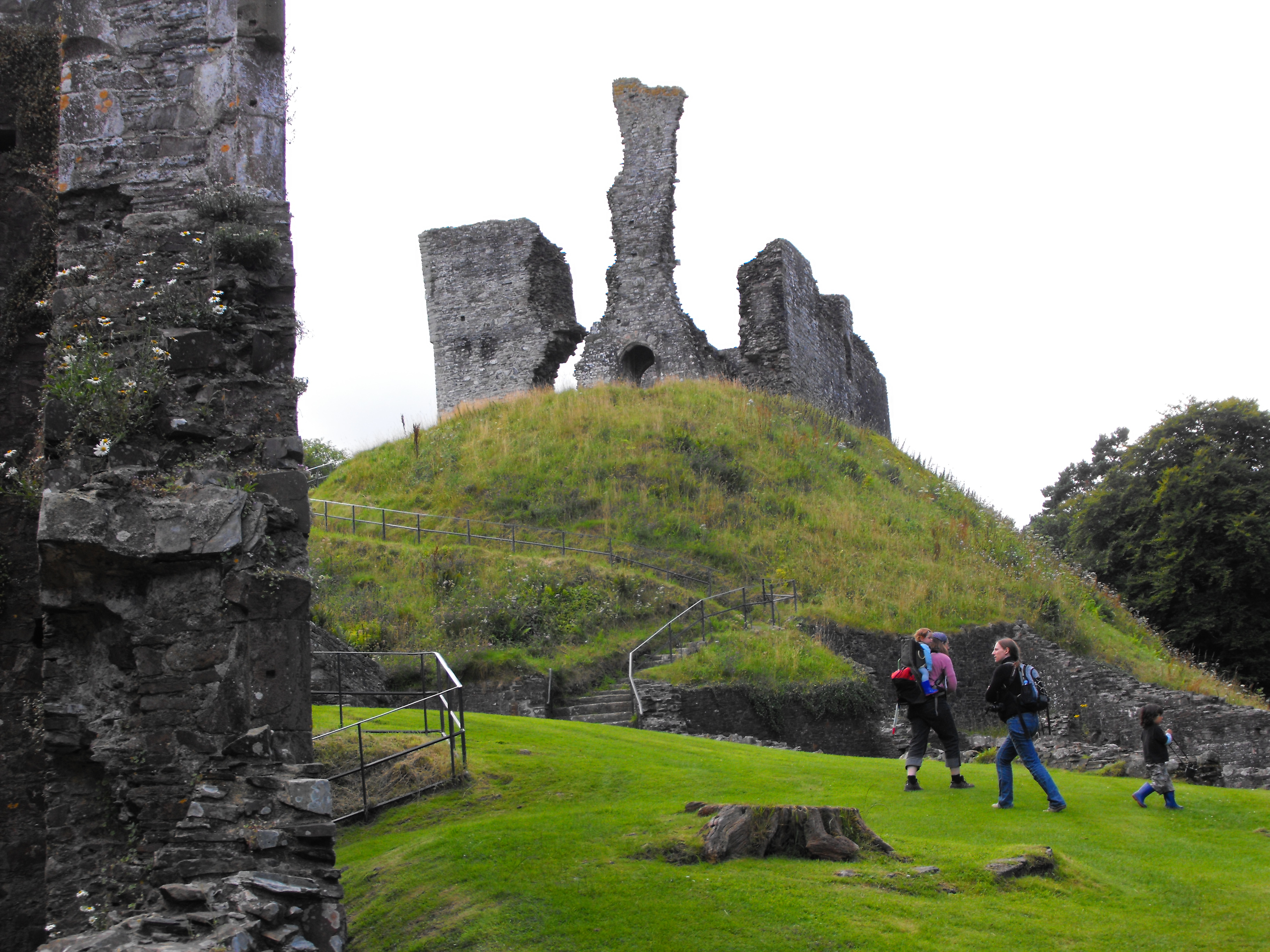
Remains of Okehampton Castle today

Okehampton was the caput of a large feudal barony, which at the time of the Domesday Book was held by Baldwin FitzGilbert. The tenure of the barony is obscure for the twenty years following his death in 1090. After that it was held by the heiress Maud d'Avranches until her death in 1173, and then passed to her daughter, Hawise de Curci (died 1219), who married Reginald de Courtenay. His French possessions were confiscated by the French King Louis VII, but were given, together with the marriage of his daughter Elizabeth de Courtenay, to his youngest brother Peter I of Courtenay. The Courtenay family rebuilt Okehampton Castle, until King Henry VIII seized the lands and had Henry Courtenay, 1st Marquess of Exeter executed for treason in 1539. The castle is now owned by English Heritage and is open to the public during the summer season. The town is also home to the Museum of Dartmoor Life, which has received notable visitors such as the then-Prince Charles.

=== Political representation ===
Okehampton elected two members to the Unreformed House of Commons. The Reform Act of 1832 abolished its representation as a rotten borough.

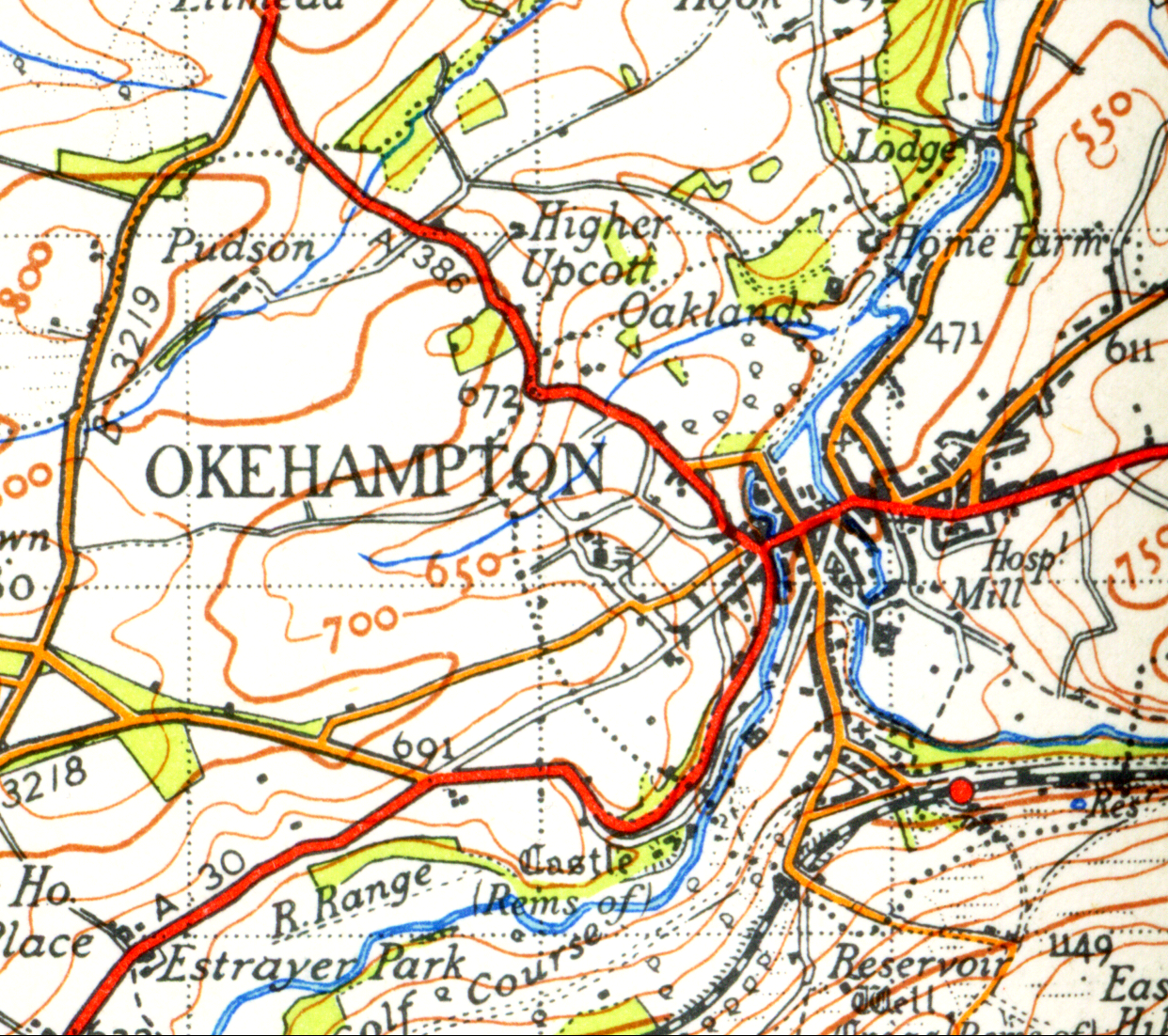
Map of Okehampton from 1946

== Demographics ==
At the 2021 census, the parish had a population of 7,309 people in 3,348 households, a small rise on the 7,104 recorded at the 2011 census. The Office for National Statistics also define an Okehampton built-up area, which includes 21st century housing developments on the eastern edge of the town in neighbouring Okehampton Hamlets parish; this area had a population of 9,110 at the 2021 census.

Census population of Okehampton parish
Census	Population	Female	Male	Households	Source
2001	5,846	3,002	2,844	2,544	
2011	7,104	3,650	3,454	3,090	
2021	7,309	3,691	3,618	3,348	

== Military presence ==
There is a substantial British Army training camp on Dartmoor which can be reached via Okehampton, and is commonly referred to as "Okehampton Camp". It is managed by the Defence Training Estate, and used by a variety of military units, including the Commando Training Centre Royal Marines (CTCRM), Lympstone, Devon, and many cadet training units. The Ten Tors event is run by the Army each year in early May from Okehampton Camp.

== Education ==
Schools in the town include Okehampton Primary School and Okehampton College. There are also a number of smaller primary schools in the surrounding areas for children within the catchment area of Okehampton that include South Tawton, Hatherleigh, Chagford, North Tawton and Bridestowe.

The Promise School, a 100-capacity school for SEND children aged 4–16 with autism or social, emotional and mental health (SEMH) special educational needs, opened in September 2022 as part of the Dartmoor Multi-Academy Trust. The school's purpose-built building on an industrial estate in Okehampton opened in September 2023 and was destroyed in a fire on 22 February 2026.

== Religion ==
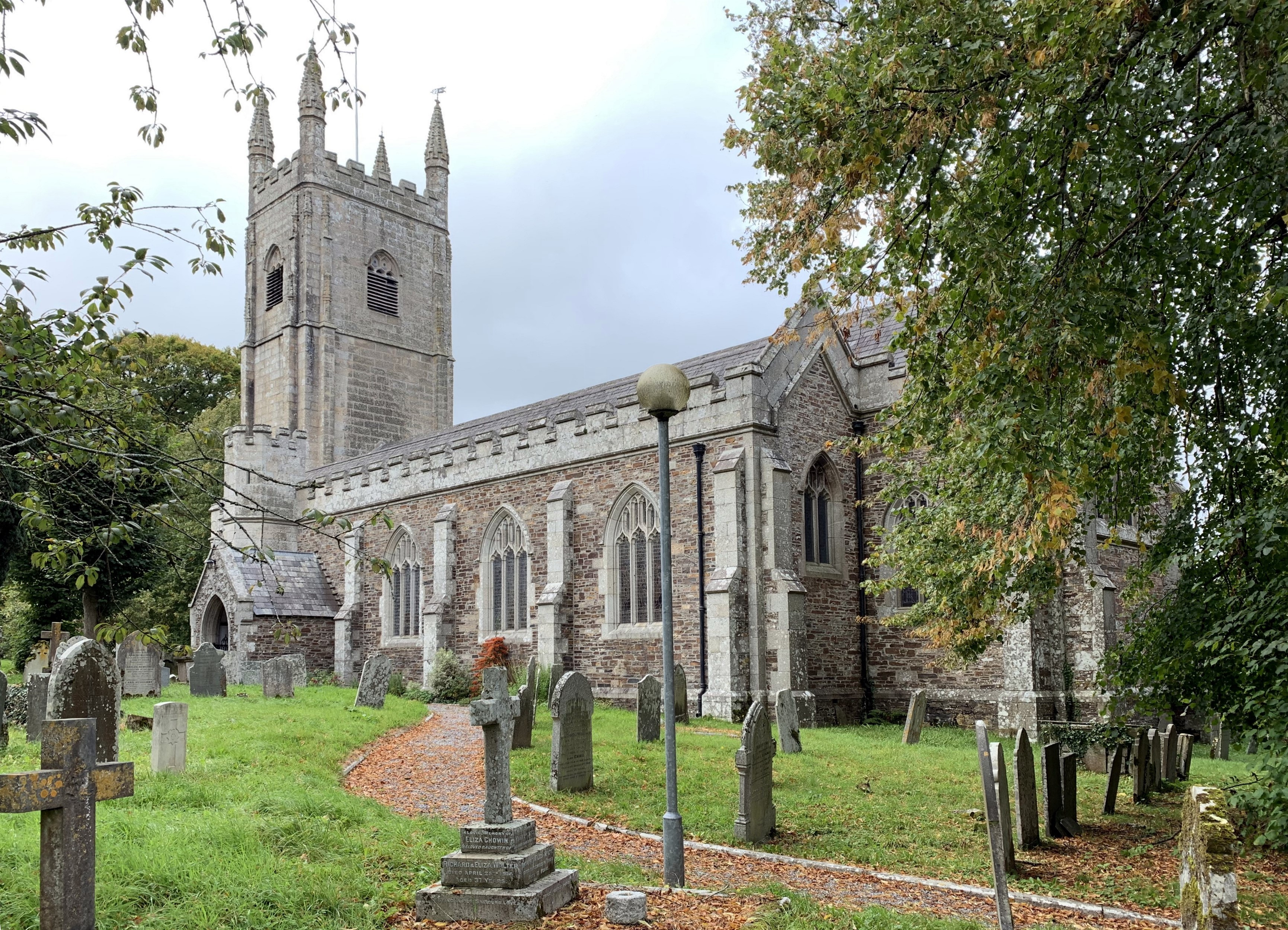
All Saints Church

The Anglican parish church of All Saints is located on Church Path, on a slight hill to the west of the town centre. Its origins are Saxon, long predating the earliest recorded consecration by Walter Branscombe, bishop of Exeter, in 1261. The medieval building was reconstructed in 1447, but was almost completely destroyed in a fire in 1842. Another reconstruction followed, overseen by John Hayward who incorporated an 80 ft (24 m) granite ashlar tower which survived the fire into the new church.

Within the building, the remnants of a reredos can be seen in the south aisle. Its replacement was constructed in stone by Harry Hems in 1891. The choir stalls and altar rails date from this time, while the pulpit is slightly earlier. Stained glass in the church includes work by Morris & Co., the Kemp studios and Ward and Hughes. Some medieval glass is preserved in the Lady Chapel. The church is a grade II* listed building.

Fairplace United Church is located on St James Street. The church has been a centre for both Methodism and the United Reformed Church. Fairplace Church was built in 1904 for the Wesleyan Methodists, who were joined by a congregation from the Bible Christian tradition in 1962. It then joined with the United Reform Church in 1974.

The Baptist Chapel on Fore Street was built in 1889 and enlarged in 1901. Other churches include the Okehampton New Life Church, a Pentecostal church, a Jehovah's Witnesses hall on East Street, and the Catholic church of St Boniface on Station Road.

== Sport ==
The town's football team, Okehampton Argyle F.C., is a non-league club which was established in 1926 after the original side, Okehampton Town, disbanded. The club competes in the South West Peninsula League which sits at Steps 6 and 7 of the National League System; four leagues below the top division of non-league football, the Football Conference. The town also has a rugby club, Okehampton RFC, which is believed to have been founded in 1884. There is also a table tennis club in the town that was purpose-built for the sport beside the local post office off the town.

== Media ==
Local TV coverage is provided by BBC South West and ITV West Country. Television signals are received from Caradon Hill transmitting station and local relays.

Local radio stations are BBC Radio Devon, Heart West, Greatest Hits Radio South West and Radio Exe Devon.

The town is served by the Okehampton Times newspaper, which publishes on Thursdays.

== Transport ==
Okehampton's location at the edge of the moor means that it has always been a route centre.

=== Road ===
The A30 trunk road gives fast access to the east and west. After years of uncertainty, this trunk road was finally re-routed in 1988 to bypass the town, which had previously been a holiday traffic bottleneck on summer weekends.

There was a public inquiry from May 9 1979 to February 1980 at the Charter Hall, about the proposed bypass. Sylvia Sayer led a protest. The contract was awarded in October 1986 to Mowlem for £16.6m. The bypass terminus was at Sourton Down, being 5.3 miles. Worked started on Monday November 17 1986. The A30 bypass was opened on July 19 1988; the A303 Ilminster bypass was also opened on the same day, another bypass that has been steeped in significant controversy.

=== Rail ===
Okehampton railway station is on the former northerly rail route from Exeter St Davids to Plymouth via Tavistock. The line from Exeter was kept open for freight traffic to and from Meldon Quarry, two miles (3.2 km) west of Okehampton. In 1997, Devon County Council revived a passenger rail service from Exeter, on summer weekends only, in an attempt to reduce motor traffic to the national park, which became a summer Sunday service, operated at its closure by Great Western Railway. The station was also previously served by heritage trains, but closed to all services in 2019. Okehampton station then reopened to a regular service in 2021 following refurbishment of the line. The Dartmoor line, as it is now called, opened with a two hourly service to Exeter St Davids which increased to hourly in spring 2022.

In the wake of widespread disruption caused by damage to the mainline track at Dawlish by coastal storms in February 2014, leaving Plymouth and Cornwall with no rail connection to the rest of the country, Network Rail considered reopening the Exeter-to-Plymouth route via Okehampton and Tavistock.

A new second station, Okehampton Interchange, opened in July 2026 on the eastern side of town. The station has a bus interchange, 200 car parking spaces and cycle parking, to serve as a Park and Ride for the greater Devon area as it is located close to the A30. It is also expected to serve new homes being built in the area..

=== Bus services ===
Okehampton is served by various bus services from Exeter, Bude, Newquay and Tavistock. Stagecoach South West service 6 links from Bude via Holsworthy to Okehampton. Other services from Exeter bus station include the Dartline 66 service via Exeter St Davids. Stagecoach run service 118 to Tavistock. There are also rural services operated by County Bus and MD Coaches. There was formerly a town service numbered 318, but it was withdrawn in 2015.

== Notable people ==
- Gwyllym Lloyd Wardle (c.1762–1833), a Welsh Lt. Colonel in the dragoons, and the local MP, 1807-1812.
- John Luxmoore (1766–1830), an English bishop of three episcopal sees, successively of Bristol, Hereford and St. Asaph.
- John Campbell, 2nd Marquess of Breadalbane (1796–1862), politician and local MP, 1820–1826.
- George Agar-Ellis, 1st Baron Dover (1797–1833), politician, man of letters and local MP, 1830-1831.
- James Meadows Rendel (1799–1856), an English civil engineer.
- Edmund Sedding (1836–1868) an English architect and musician.
- Sydney Simmons (1840–1924), a carpet cleaning entrepreneur and philanthropist, both in Okehampton and Friern Barnet

=== Sport ===
- Ernie Knapman (1898–1982), rugby union and professional rugby league footballer, played 206 games for Oldham R.L.F.C.
- Georgina Geikie (born 1984), sport shooter who competed in the 2012 Summer Olympics, she also won two team bronze medals in the Commonwealth Games

== Nearby settlements ==
Except for the open country of Dartmoor to the south, Okehampton is surrounded by many smaller villages and towns. Notable examples are the villages of South Zeal with its ancient burgage plots, granite thatched cottages and Dartmoor Folk Festival; Belstone on the outskirts of Dartmoor; and Sticklepath which has an annual fire show on Bonfire Night, 5 November. Other nearby villages and settlements include Hatherleigh, North Tawton, Whiddon Down, Chagford, Bratton Clovelly, Lydford, Folly Gate, Southcott, Northlew, Jacobstowe, Bridestowe and Sourton.
