= List of geographical tors =

The following list enumerate and expand on notable tors.

== Tors in Great Britain ==
=== Dartmoor ===
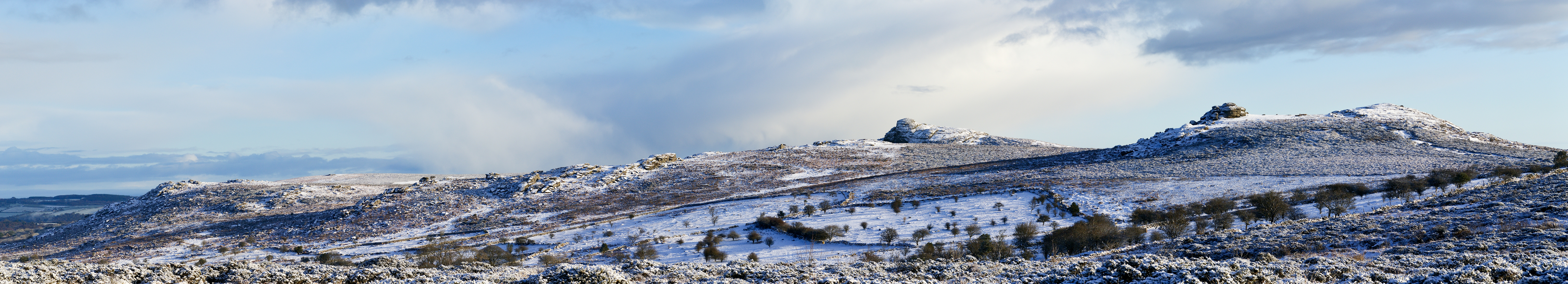
Panorama of some of Dartmoor's tors in the snow

Dartmoor represents one of the largest areas of exposed granite in the United Kingdom, covering an area of 368 square miles (950 km^{2}). It is part of a chain of granite stretching through Cornwall, as far as the Isles of Scilly.

Some of the more durable granite survived to form the rocky crowns of Dartmoor tors. One of the best known is at Haytor (50.5802°N 3.7552°W) on the eastern part of the moor, the granite of which is of unusually fine quality and was quarried from the hillside below during the 19th and early 20th centuries. Its stone was used to construct the pillars outside the British Museum in London and to build London Bridge. The last granite to be quarried there was used to build Exeter War Memorial in 1919.

Ten Tors is an annual weekend hike on Dartmoor.

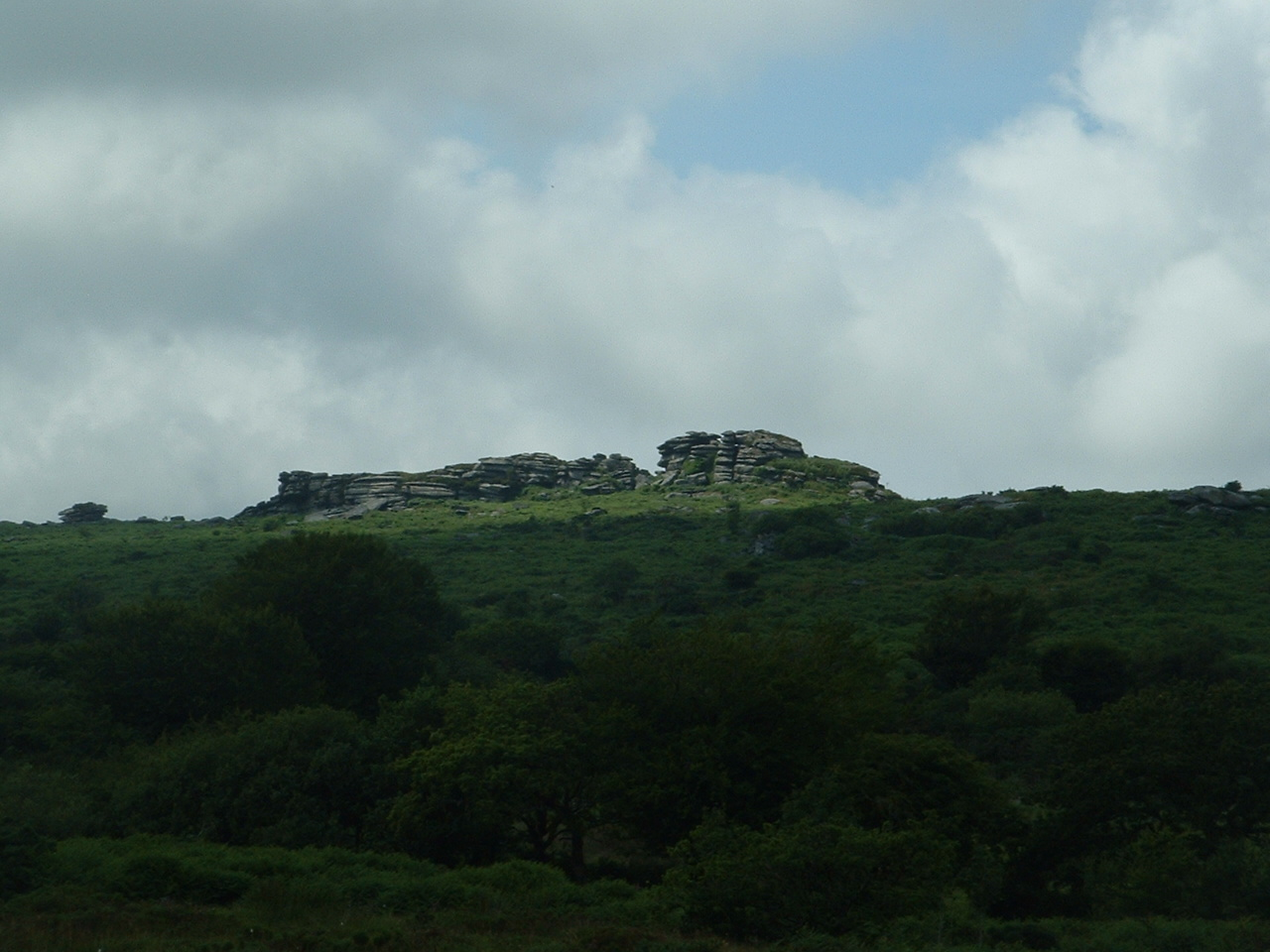
Hawk's Tor, Bodmin Moor, Cornwall

=== Cornwall ===
- Alex Tor, Bodmin Moor
- Hawk's Tor, Bodmin Moor. There are two on the moor:
  - One near Lewannick
  - One near Temple
- Helman Tor, mid–Cornwall
- Rough Tor, Bodmin Moor
- Trewortha Tor, Bodmin Moor
- Showery Tor, Bodmin Moor
- Cheesewring, Bodmin Moor
- Brown Willy, Bodmin Moor
- Carneglos Tor, Bodmin Moor
- Temple Tor, Bodmin Moor
- Garrow Tor, Bodmin Moor
- Kilmar Tor, Bodmin Moor
- Butter's Tor, Bodmin Moor
- Carn Brea, Redruth
- Sharp Tor, Bodmin Moor
- St Bellarmins Tor, Bodmin Moor
- Codda Tor, Bodmin Moor
- Maiden Tor, Bodmin Moor
- Little Rough Tor, Bodmin Moor
- Catshole Tor, Bodmin Moor
- Butter's Tor, Bodmin Moor
- Carbilly Tor, Bodmin Moor
- Fox Tor, Bodmin Moor
- Tolcarne Tor, Bodmin Moor
- Greymare Rock, Bodmin Moor
- Hill Tor, Bodmin Moor
- Tregarrick Tor, Bodmin Moor
- Bearah Tor, Bodmin Moor
- Newel Tor, Bodmin Moor
- Colvannick Tor, Bodmin Moor
- Carburrow Tor, Bodmin Moor
- Carkees Tor, Bodmin Moor
- Carey Tor, Bodmin Moor
- Trekennick Tor, Bodmin Moor
- Lanlavery Rock, Bodmin Moor
- Jubilee Rock, Bodmin Moor

Hills:

- Kit Hill, Callington
- Hensbarrow Beacon, St Austell Downs
- Buttern Hill, Bodmin Moor
- Candra Hill, Bodmin Moor
- Carn Brea, Penwith
- Dinnever Hill, Bodmin Moor
- Louden Hill, Bodmin Moor
- Caradon Hill, Bodmin Moor
- Watch Croft, Penwith
- Hensbarrow Beacon, St Austell Downs
- Carnmenellis, between Redruth, Helston and Penryn
- Hobb's Hill, Bodmin Moor

=== Peak District ===
There are many tors in this area, notably in the Dark Peak, where the host rock is Millstone Grit:

- Back Tor, Derwent Edge (538m)
- Carl Wark, Hathersage Moor
- Chee Tor, Buxton
- Dovestone Tor, Derwent Edge (505m)
- Great Tor, Bamford

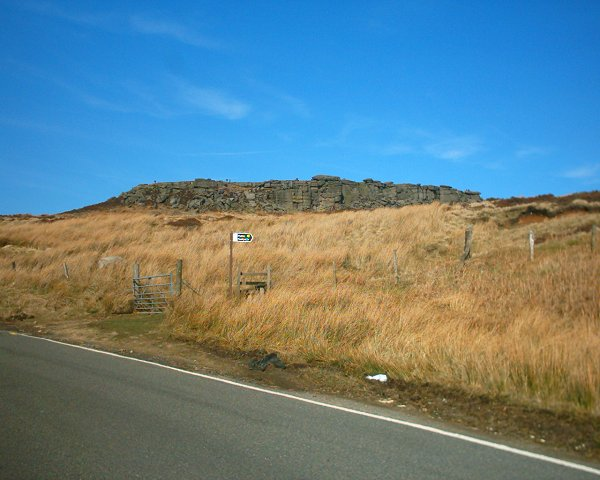
Higger Tor

- Higger Tor (384m) and Over Owler Tor (375m)
- Howshaw Tor overlooking Sheffield
- Ladybower Tor, Upper Derwent Valley
- Low Tor, Bradfield Moors
- The Salt Cellar on Derwent Edge
- Mam Tor, Edale
- Owler Tor, Burbage, [53.3167,-1.6206]
- Whinstone Lee Tor
- White Tor, Derwent Moors (487m)

In addition there are hills that incorporate 'tor' in their name but do not feature the geomorphological feature described in this article. Examples include Mam Tor and Shining Tor.

=== Pennines ===
- Almscliffe Crag west of Harrogate
- Cow and Calf, Ilkley Moor in West Yorkshire, made of Millstone Grit
- Haslingden Tor. (Musbury Hill) Helmshore Rossendale, Lancashire

=== Scotland ===
There are numerous tors developed in the Cairngorm granite in the Scottish Highlands:

- The Barns of Bynack, tors on Bynack More
- Ben Avon
- Beinn a' Bhuird
- Beinn Mheadhoin

=== Other areas ===
- Glastonbury Tor - an example of the use of the word in the sense of “hill” without any rock outcrops.
- Stiperstones, Shropshire Hills
- The Schil, Newton Tors, in Northumberland

Tor Bay, one of the sandy beaches near Oxwich Bay on the Gower Peninsula in south Wales, is so-called because the beach is framed by a huge outcrop of Carboniferous Limestone.

== Tors in other regions ==
=== Africa ===
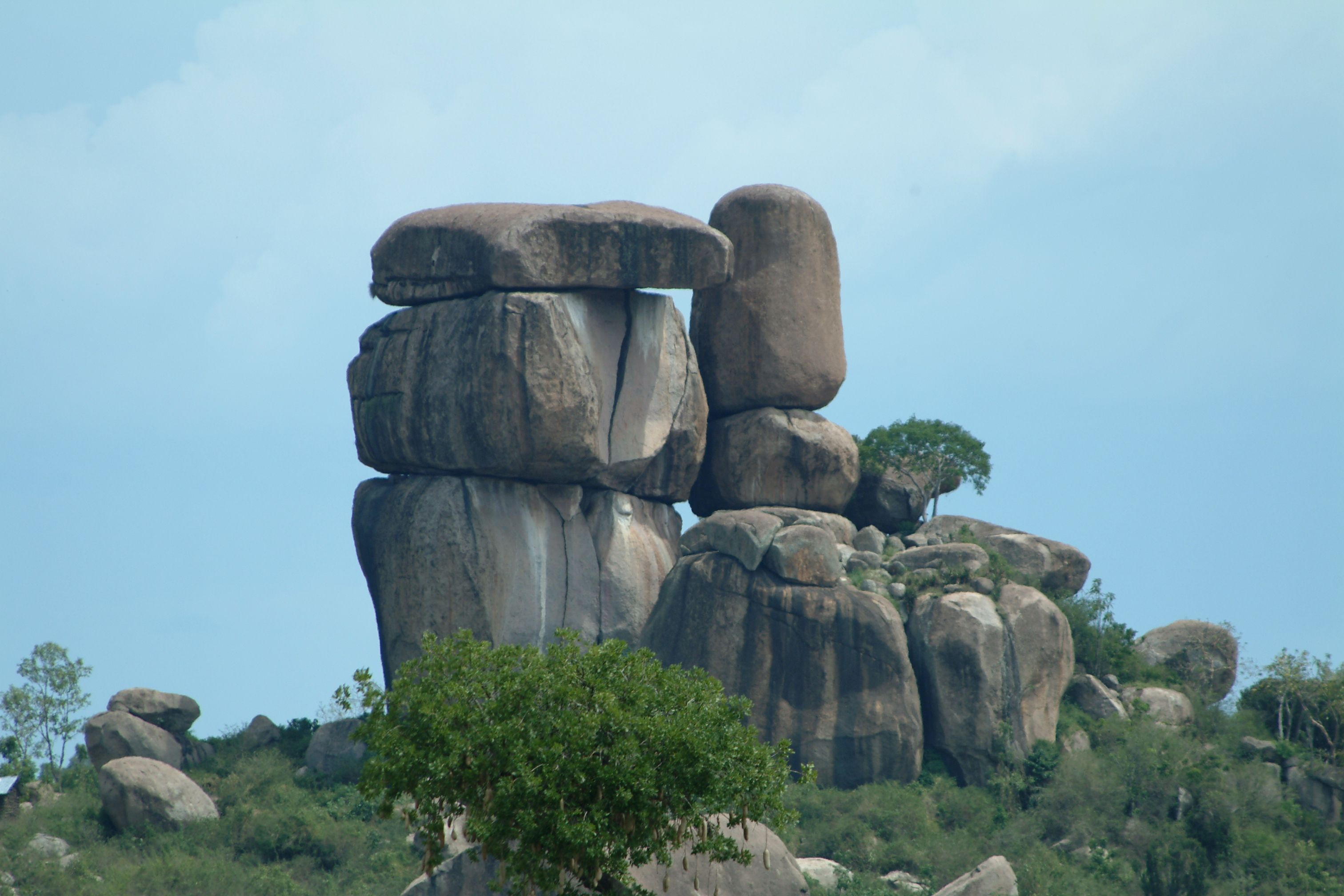
Mkani, a celebrated tor near Cheredzi, Zimbabwe

- Kit-Mikayi, Kenya
- Castle koppies of Central Zimbabwe.

=== Germany ===
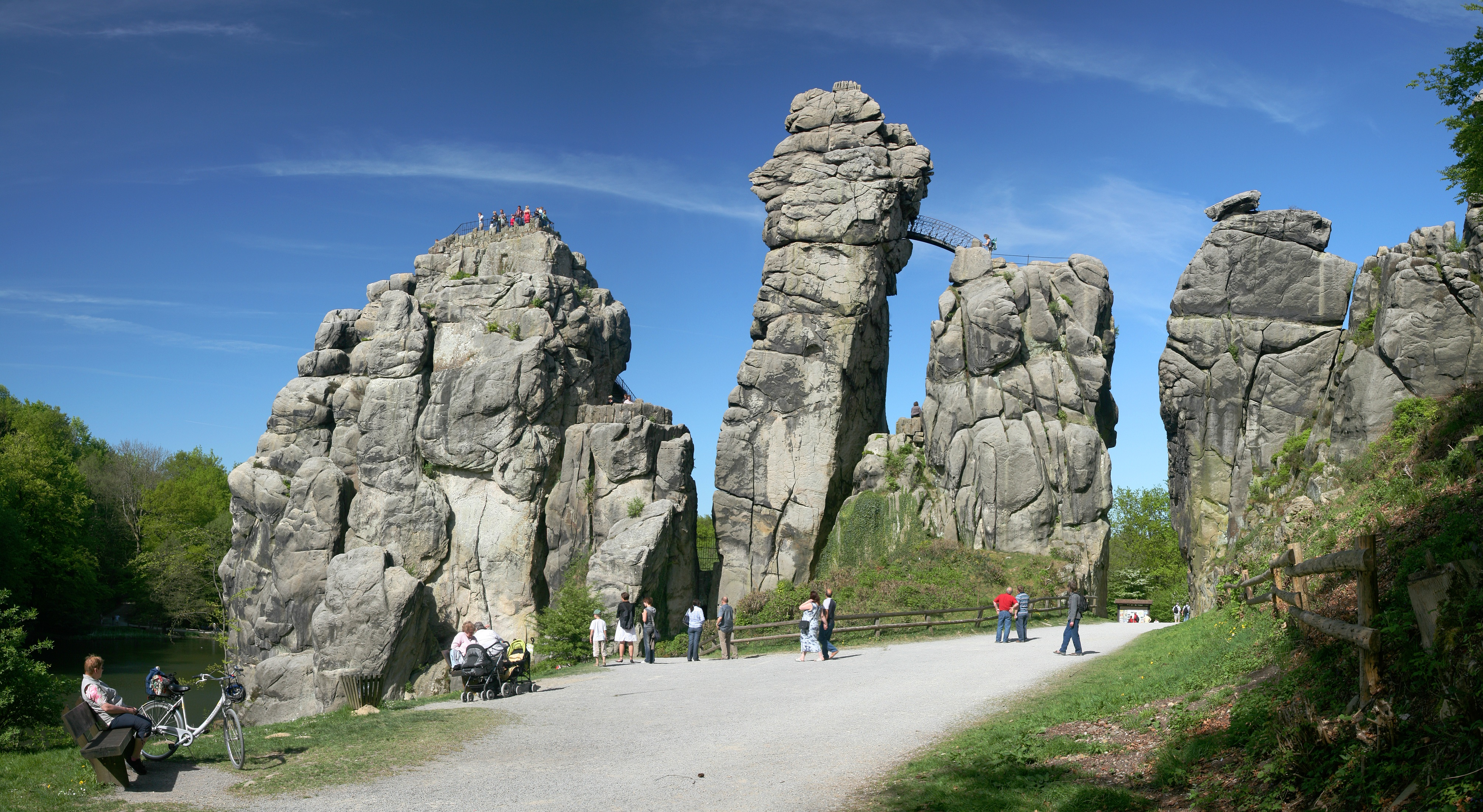
Externsteine, Germany

- Externsteine in the Teutoburg Forest, North Rhine-Westphalia
- Greifensteine in the Ore Mountains of Saxony
- Großer Waldstein in the Fichtel Mountains of Bavaria
- Heinrichshöhe and Hohneklippen in the Harz mountains of central Germany
- Wolfenstein in Bavaria

=== India ===
Tors are very commonly found in Deccan regions of Maharashtra, Telangana, Karnataka, Andhra Pradesh and Tamil Nadu.

=== Malaysia ===
- Mount Datuk, Negeri Sembilan

=== North America ===
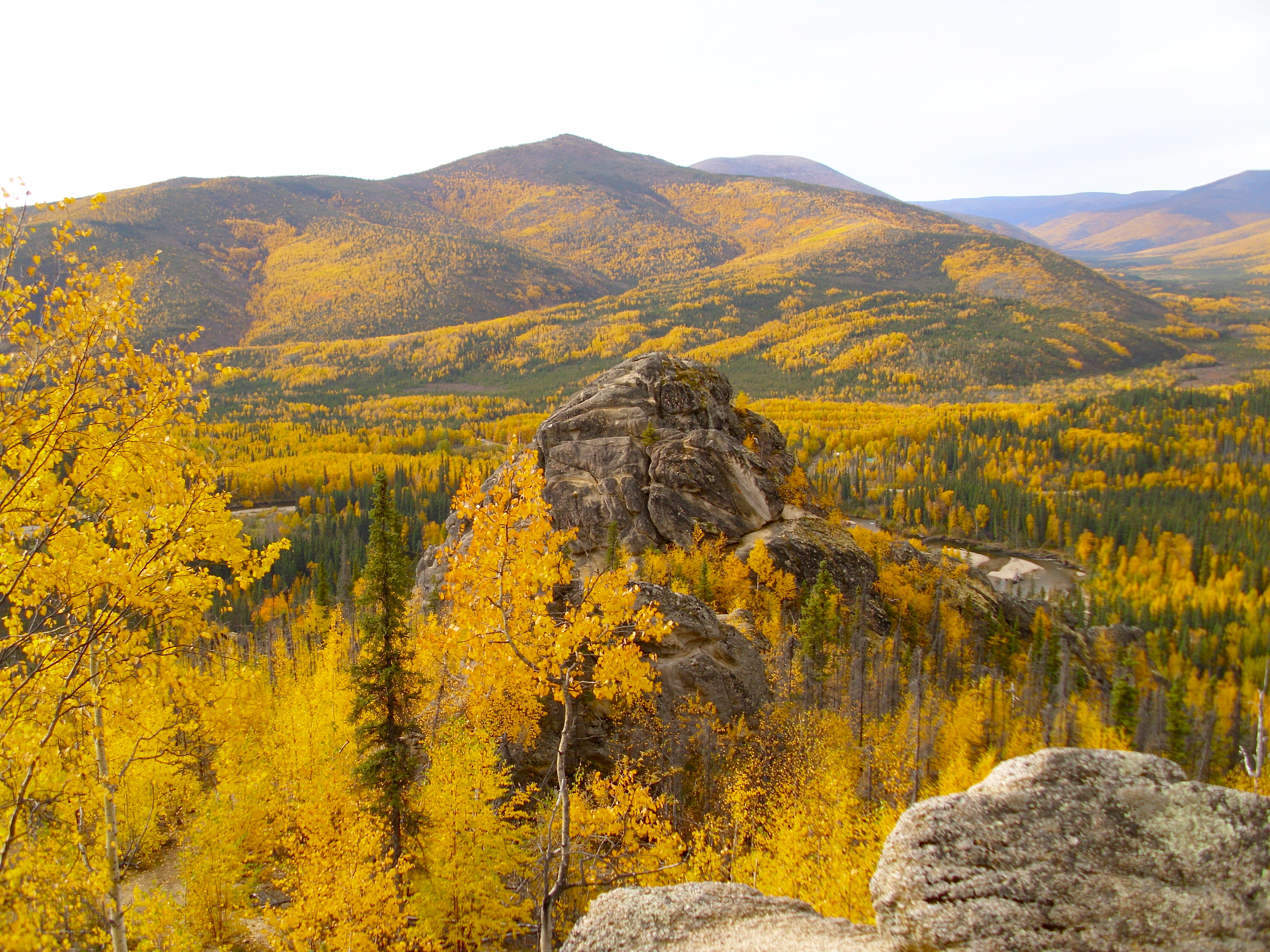
Part of the Angel Rocks formation in Alaska

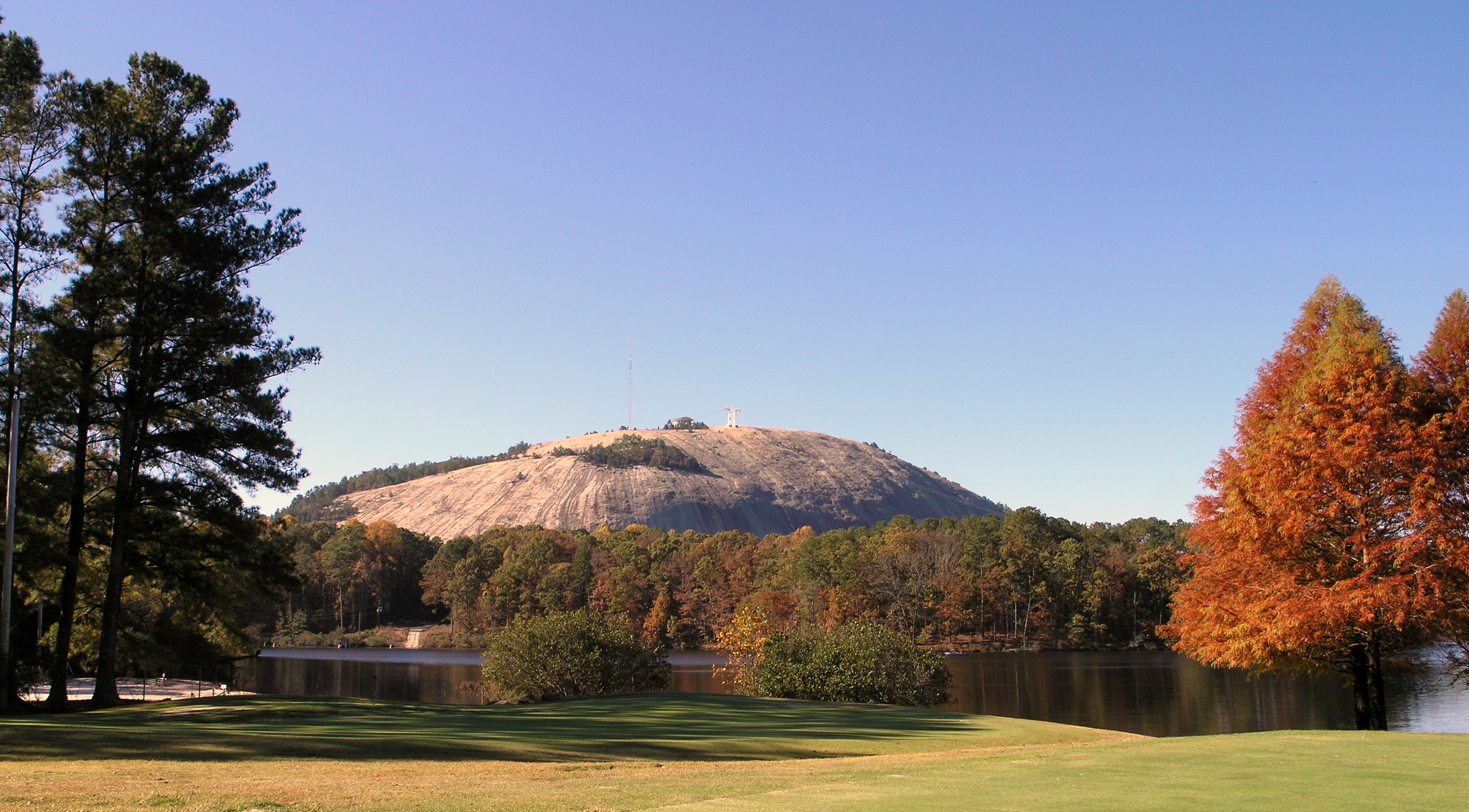
Stone Mountain is a quartz monzonite dome monadnock and the site of Stone Mountain Park near Stone Mountain, Georgia.

- Stone Mountain, Georgia, USA
- Angel Rocks and Granite Tors, Chena River State Recreation Area, Alaska
- Finger Mountain area, Dalton Highway, Alaska
- Elephant Rocks, Missouri
- Apache Leap Formation near Superior, Arizona
- Texas Canyon, Arizona
- Wichita Mountains, Oklahoma
- Pilot Mountain, North Carolina
- High Tor, Freeland Mountain (a part of Pocono Mountain), near Freeland, Pennsylvania
- Vedauwoo, Wyoming

=== New Zealand ===
- Schist tors in Central Otago
- Ignimbrite tors west of Rotorua

=== Spain ===
- Tors of the Central Pyrinees.
- Castle koppies of Traba Massif, Galicia.

=== Ireland ===
- Three Rock Mountain, Dublin
