= Battle of Hingston Down =

Battle between a combined force of Cornish and Vikings against West Saxons in 838

Coordinates: 50.521°N 4.2473°W

- Part of the Viking invasions of England
Date	838 AD
Location	Hingston Down, Cornwall
Result	West Saxon victory

Belligerents
West Saxons	Cornish; Danish Vikings

Commanders and leaders
Ecgberht of Wessex	Unknown

Casualties and losses
Unknown	Unknown

A map of Britain during the middle of the 9th century, including a map of the location of the Anglo Saxon battle with Danes at Hingston Down, and its predecessor the battle of Carhampton

The Battle of Hingston Down took place in 838, probably at Hingston Down in Cornwall between a combined force of Cornish and Vikings on the one side, and West Saxons led by Ecgberht, King of Wessex on the other. The result was a West Saxon victory. According to the Anglo-Saxon Chronicle, which called the Cornish the West Welsh:

In this year a great naval force arrived among the West Welsh, and the latter combined with them and proceeded to fight against Ecgberht, king of the West Saxons. When he heard that, he then went hither with his army, and fought against them at Hingston Down, and put both the Welsh and the Danes to flight.

Most historians of the period identify the site of the battle as Hingston Down north-east of Callington in Cornwall, but others argue for Hingston Down near Moretonhampstead, Devon, and Hingston Hill, near to Down Tor on Dartmoor

This was the last recorded battle between the Cornish and the West Saxons and ended roughly a century of warfare that began at the Battle of Llongborth in 710 (see Geraint of Dumnonia). The last known king of Cornwall, Dungarth, died in 875, but he is thought to have been an under-king subject to Wessex.

== Sources ==
- Charles-Edwards, Thomas (2013). Wales and the Britons 350–1064. Oxford University Press. ISBN 978-0-19-821731-2.
- Davies, John Reuben (2013). "Wales and West Britain". In Stafford, Pauline (ed.). A Companion to the Early Middle Ages: Britain and Ireland c. 500 – c. 1100. Wiley-Blackwell. ISBN 978-1-118-42513-8.
- Hadley, Dawn (2013). "Viking Raids and Conquest". In Stafford, Pauline (ed.). A Companion to the Early Middle Ages: Britain and Ireland c. 500–c. 1100. Wiley-Blackwell. pp. 195–211. ISBN 978-1-118-42513-8.
- Padel, Oliver J. (2014). "Cornwall". In Lapidge, Michael; Blair, John; Keynes, Simon; Scragg, Donald (eds.). The Wiley Blackwell Encyclopedia of Anglo-Saxon England (2nd ed.). Wiley Blackwell. ISBN 978-0-470-65632-7.
- Stenton, Frank (1971). Anglo-Saxon England (3rd ed.). Oxford University Press. ISBN 978-0-19-280139-5.
- Whitelock, Dorothy, ed. (1979) [1st ed. 1955]. English Historical Documents. Vol. 1: c. 500–1042 (2nd ed.). Routledge. ISBN 978-0-415-14366-0.
