= Watch Croft =

Hill in Cornwall, England

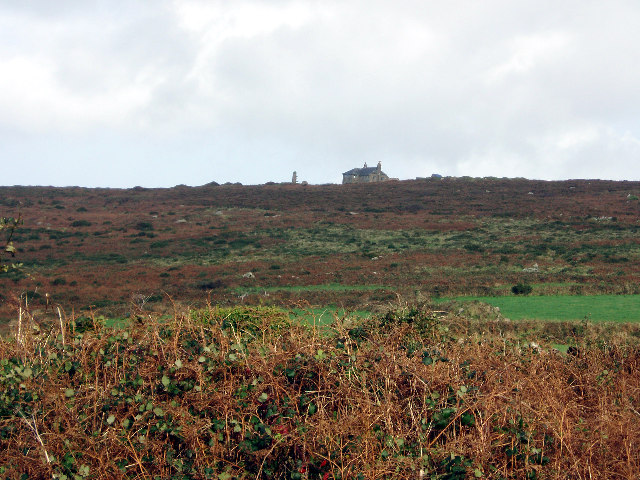
- Remote cottage at the Garden Mine on the west flank of Watch Croft.

Highest point
- Elevation: 252 m (827 ft)
- Prominence: 225 m (738 ft)
- Listing: Marilyn
- Coordinates: 50°9′52.13″N 5°36′42.11″W

Naming
- Native name: Karnan Bygh (Cornish)

Geography
- Location: West Penwith, Cornwall
- OS grid: SW420357
- Topo map: OS Landranger 203, Explorer 102

Watch Croft (Cornish: Karnan Bygh) is a prominent hill, 252 metres (827 ft) high overlooking the north coast of Cornwall, UK. Its prominence of 225 metres qualifies it as a Marilyn, one of only five in Cornwall. The others are Brown Willy (420 m), Kit Hill (334 m), Hensbarrow Beacon (312 m) and Carnmenellis (252 m). It is the highest point in West Penwith.

Watch Croft is located within an Area of Outstanding Natural Beauty and the St Just Mining District World Heritage Site, on the White Downs in the Cornish region of West Penwith, 7 kilometres WNW of Penzance, about 7½ kilometres northeast of St. Just and about a kilometre from the north Cornish coastline. The summit is a rock tor. There are views across Mount's Bay to the Lizard, south to Ding Dong Mine and north to Pendeen Watch.
