= Castle Downs =

Castle Downs may refer to:

- Castle Downs, Cornwall, the site of an important hillfort in Cornwall, England
- Castle Downs, Edmonton, a suburb of Edmonton, Canada
