= Cuckoo Rock =

Cuckoo Rock may refer to:

- Carfury Standing Stone, a standing stone near Penzance, Cornwall, also known as Cuckoo Rock
- Cuckoo Rock, Dartmoor, a boulder on Dartmoor, Devon
- Cuckoo Rock to Turbot Point, a Site of Special Scientific Interest in Roseland, Cornwall
