= Cuckoo Rock, Dartmoor =

Granite tor on Dartmoor in Devon, England

Cuckoo Rock
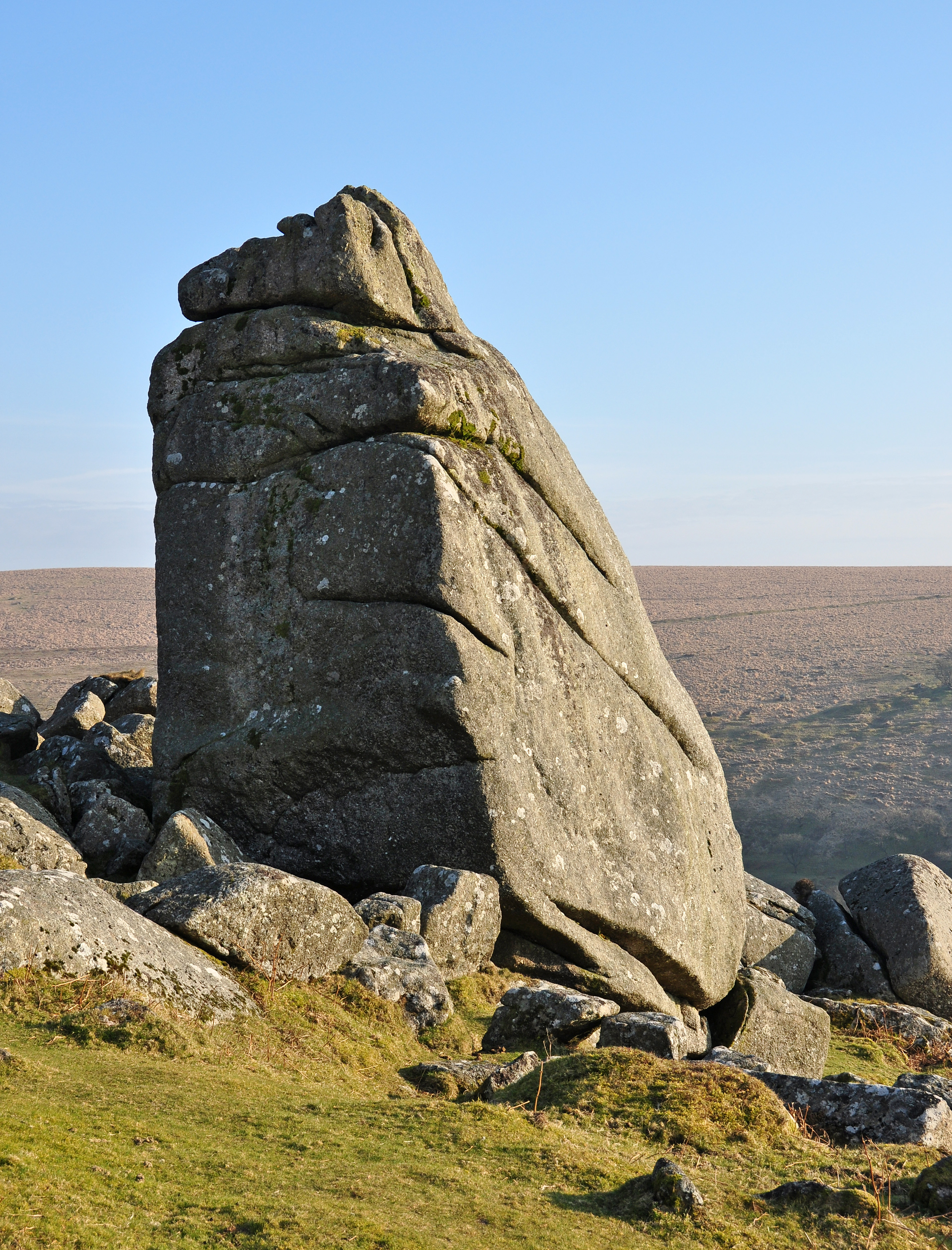
- Cuckoo Rock

- Location within Devon
- 50.50210190°N 3.99310412°W
- Type: Tor
- Location: nr Burrator Reservoir, West Devon

Cuckoo Rock is a tor-like igneous rock outcrop in West Devon. It is located to the east of Burrator Reservoir and to the south east of Down Tor, at a height of 362 m (1,188 ft).

The origin of the name is disputed. Some claim it is that the shape of the top of the rock, while others say it is as the rock was an ideal point from which to hear cuckoos in spring.

Cuckoo Rock is made of granite and was formerly used as a hideaway for smuggled goods, especially liquor.
