= Castle Downs, Cornwall =

Hill in Cornwall, England

Castle Downs
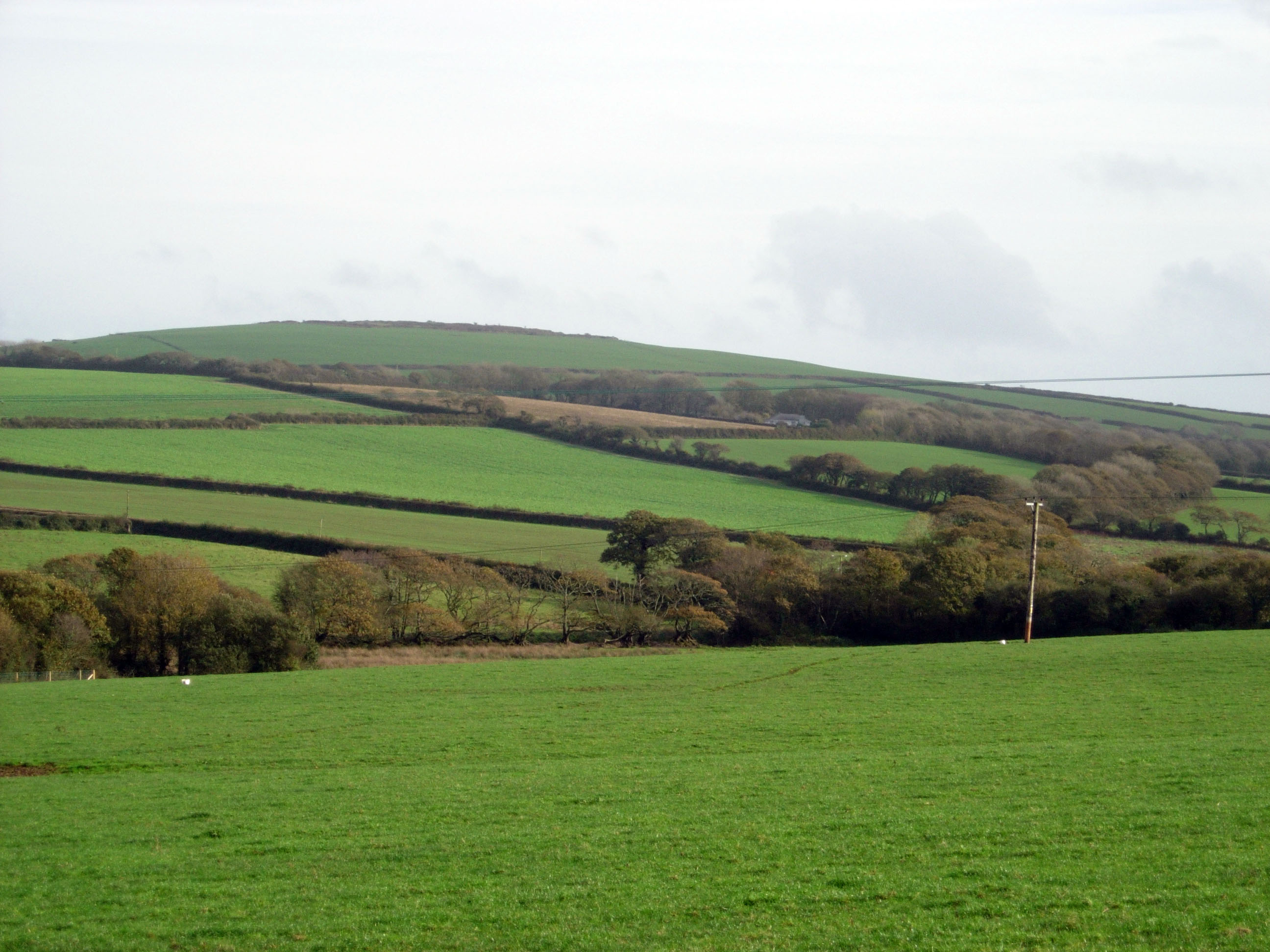
- Castle Downs. The hillfort is just visible on the summit.

Highest point
- Elevation: 216 m (709 ft)
- Prominence: 67 m (220 ft)
- Listing: TuMP
- Coordinates: 50.4248°N 4.8938°W

Geography
- Location: Cornish Killas, Cornwall, UK
- OS grid: SW945623
- Topo map: OS Landranger 200, Explorer 106

Castle Downs is a dome-shaped hill, 216 metres (709 ft) high, located in mid Cornwall, UK. There is a major hillfort, Castle an Dinas, on the summit and extensive and panoramic views across the county to both north and south coasts.

The open summit of Castle Downs is located just north of the A30 road in mid Cornwall, about 2 miles east-southeast of St Columb Major, 2 miles northeast of Indian Queens and about 7 miles west-southwest of Bodmin. About 1½ miles to the east is the sister hill of Belowda Beacon (227 m).

The major summit feature of Castle an Dinas is a massive Iron Age hill fort comprising 3 concentric ramparts and ditches that were probably originally surmounted by wooden palisades. The main entrance is to the southwest. Within the castle are 2 Bronze Age barrows. The hillfort has been partially damaged by a, now closed, 20th century wolfram mine.

Legend has it that the site was one of the seats of the Duke of Cornwall and, according to folklore, it is also where Cador, Duke of Cornwall and Ygraine, King Arthur's mother, were killed.
