= Cornish Killas =

Natural region in Cornwall, England

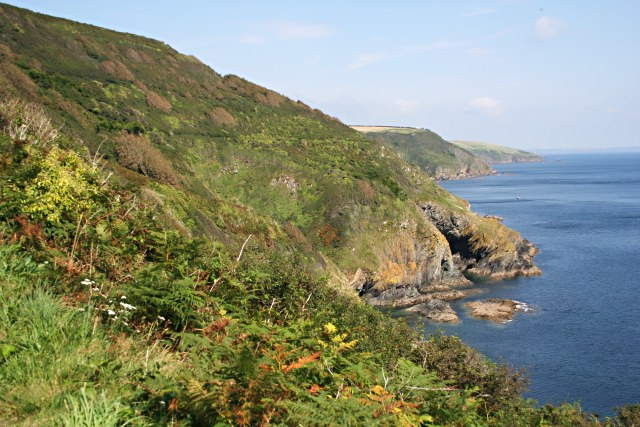
Cliffs at Polperro

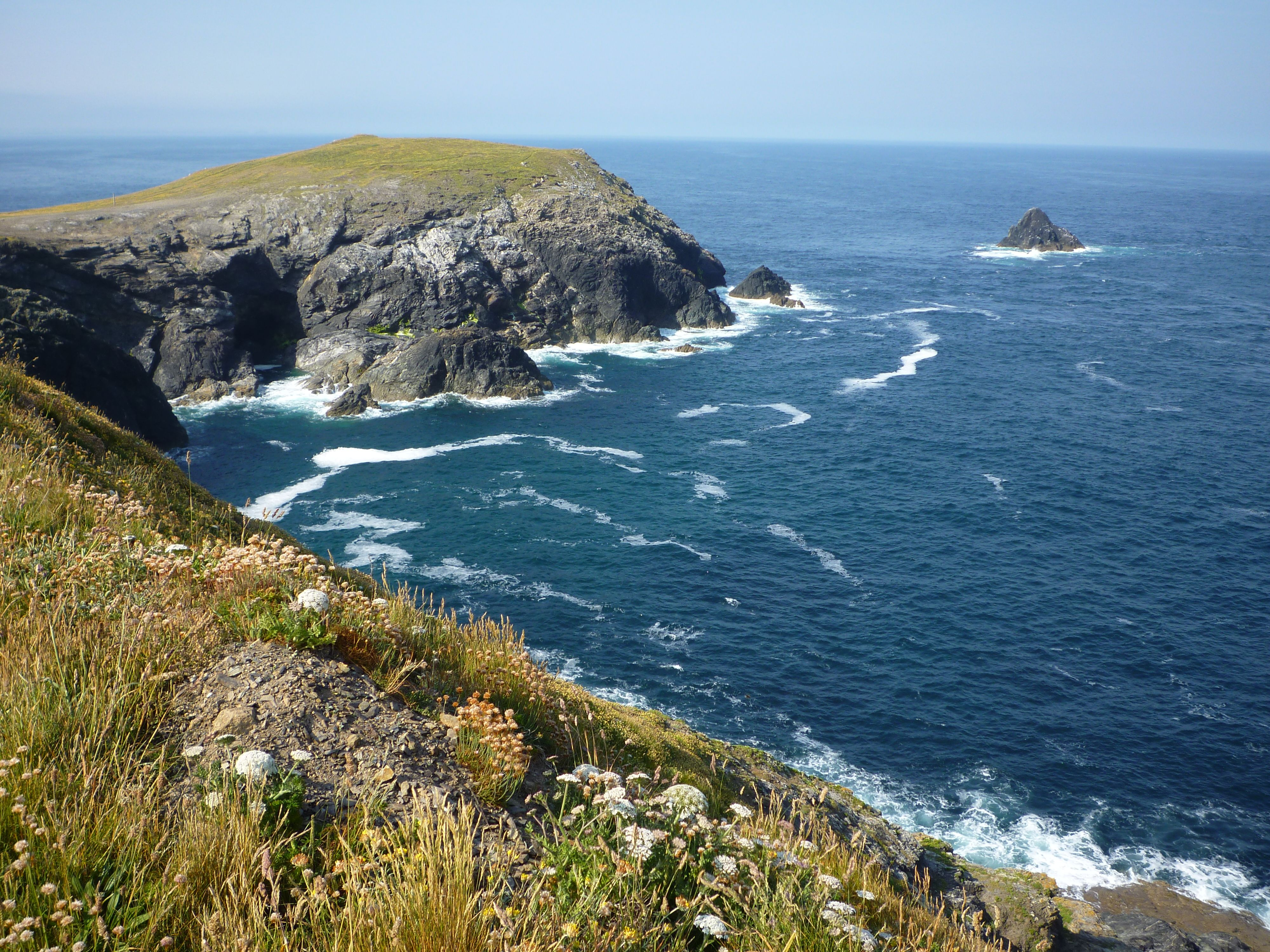
Coastline at Trevose Head

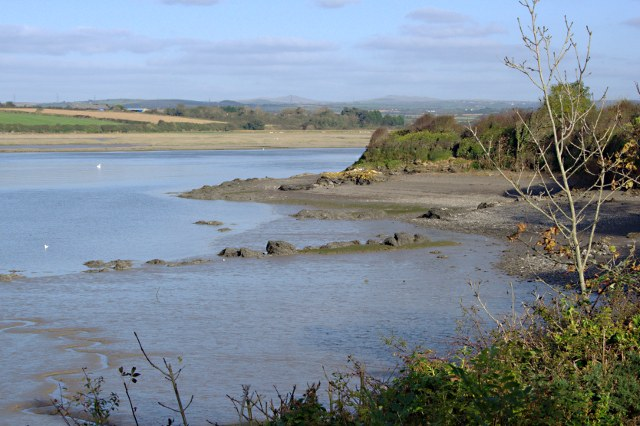
Camel estuary

The Cornish Killas is a natural region covering most of the county of Cornwall in southwest England. It has been designated as National Character Area 152 by Natural England.

Killas is a mining term for the sedimentary rocks of the Devon and Cornwall region. The Cornish Killas forms the main body of the Cornish landmass around the high granite moorlands such as Bodmin Moor and Hensbarrow. Much of central Cornwall is a gently undulating, slate plateau with little woodland and few hedgerow trees, dissected by a complex pattern of valleys. In places there is little woody vegetation apart from scrub-covered stone hedges dominating the farmland. By contrast, the coastline is richly varied, with rugged, windswept cliffs separating broad, sandy bays.

The area is rich in important archaeological and former industrial sites. Evidence of Neolithic and Bronze Age farming settlements abounds, with their round-houses, stone wall field enclosures and meadows bordering upland grazing pastures. Hillforts emerged during the Bronze Age and “rounds” existed into the early Medieval period. By the 18th century the landscape was being dramatically changed by mining for tin, copper, and china clay and quarrying for granite.
