= Carnmenellis =

Hill in Cornwall, England

Coordinates: 50.181°N 5.227°W

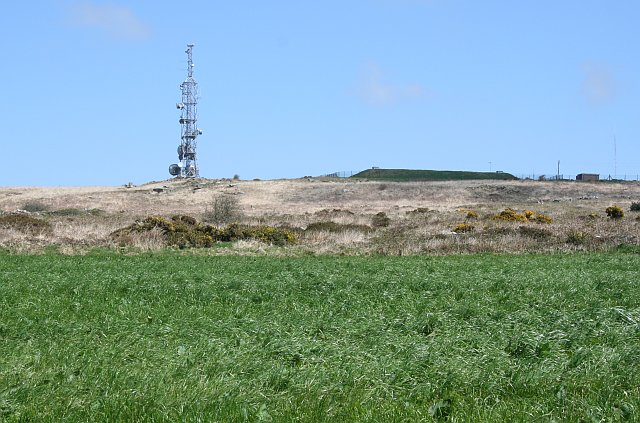
The telecommunications mast on Carnmenellis Hill. The mound to the right is a covered reservoir according to the OS map

Carnmenellis Hill (or just Carnmenellis) (Cornish: Karnmenelys) gives its name to the area of west Cornwall in England, between Redruth, Helston and Penryn. The hill itself is situated approximately three miles (5 km) south of Redruth. It is one of five Marilyns in Cornwall; the others being Brown Willy (420 m), Kit Hill (334 m), Hensbarrow Beacon (312 m) and Watch Croft (252 m). The natural region of Carnmenellis has been designated as national character area 155 by Natural England.

Penmarth, a nearby village, is sometimes referred to locally as Carnmenellis.

The term 'Carnmenellis Granite' refers to the plateau of high ground in this area, one of five granite plutons in Cornwall that make up part of the Cornubian batholith (see also Geology of Cornwall).

Carnmenellis was also the name of a former ecclesiastical parish created in 1846 from part of Wendron parish. Initially, the parish included the area which later became the parish of Pencoys. Today, most of the Carmenellis area is in Stithians civil parish.

The summit of Carnmenellis Hill is located at OS grid reference:grid reference SW 695 364) and is 252 metres (828 feet) above sea level. A microwave transmitting and receiving tower on the summit is used for telephone and computer connections as well as other data and television and radio broadcasting links. It is maintained by BT.

A number of Iron Age fortifications surround the hill, but little archaeological research has been done on the site.

There is no public right of way across the summit, and the surrounding land is private farmland, though about half of the fields are Open Access land.
