= Kit Hill =

Hill and country park in Cornwall, England

Coordinates: 50.51887°N 4.29360°W

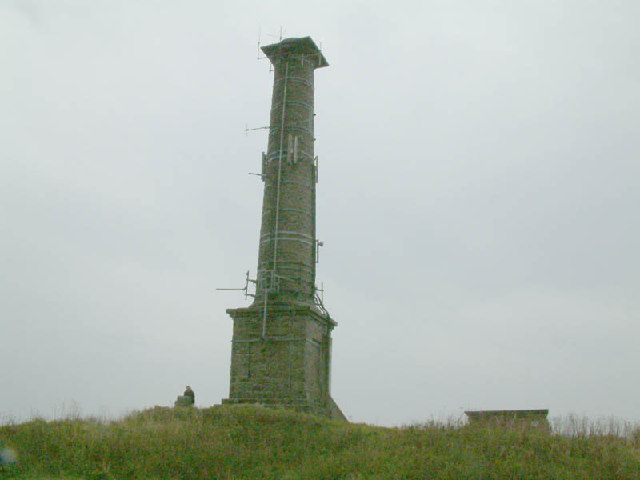
- The ornate mine chimney, now clad in a range of transmitters and aerials, on top of Kit Hill.

Highest point
- Elevation: 334 m (1,096 ft)
- Prominence: 171 m (561 ft)
- Parent peak: None
- Listing: Marilyn

Geography
- Location: Cornwall, United Kingdom
- OS grid: SX375713
- Topo map: OS Landranger 201

Kit Hill (Cornish: Bre Skowl), at 334 metres high, dominates the area between Callington and the River Tamar in southeast Cornwall, England, UK. The word 'Kit' comes from Old English for kite, a reference to birds of prey (and not specifically the red kite). Buzzards and sparrowhawks can still be seen on the hill. It is one of five Marilyn hills in Cornwall, the four others are Watch Croft, Brown Willy, Carnmenellis and Hensbarrow Beacon.

== Geography ==
Kit Hill Country Park (which includes the hill and surrounding areas), was given to the people of Cornwall in 1985 to mark the birth of Prince William, by his father, the Duke of Cornwall (Prince Charles). It is managed by Cornwall Council, and consists of some 400 acres (152 hectares), making it the most dominant landscape feature in East Cornwall. Kit Hill is the highest point in the Tamar Valley Area of Outstanding Natural Beauty.

The hill was formed in the same way as nearby Bodmin Moor by the intrusion of magma into overlying sedimentary rocks. This caused the formation of many mineral deposits that were mined extensively in the 18th and early 19th centuries.

As the highest point of Hingston Down, Kit Hill is probably the best viewpoint in the southeast of Cornwall, with views of the Tamar valley, Dartmoor and Bodmin Moor. Kit Hill Country Park has a high wildlife population including deer and badgers, rabbits, rare moths and butterflies.

On the summit of Kit Hill is an artificial fort (a Civil War redoubt) and a folly built by Sir John Call of Whiteford, Stoke Climsland, built in the style of a low-walled Saxon castle.

== History ==
The Anglo-Saxon Chronicle reports that in 835 (corrected by scholars to 838 AD) Egbert king of the West Saxons defeated an army of Vikings and Cornish at Hengestdun = "Stallion Hill", which is usually interpreted as being at Hingston Down.

Other notable artifacts on Kit Hill include Neolithic and Bronze Age barrows. The area around these is maintained by a ranger and volunteers, who also generally keep the vegetation on the hill under control.

== Mining ==
The Country Park is steeped in mining history. Metals extracted included tin, silver, copper and tungsten.
The main mines were:

- Kit Hill Summit Mines (which included a windmill near the present stack). These mines and shafts started about 1826: Kit Hill United closed in 1864.
- East Kit Hill Mine was worked from 1855 to 1909.
- Hingston Down mine (which worked westwards towards Kit Hill). This was a very early mine, and evidence shows it may have started in the 17th century: it closed in 1885.
- South Kit Hill Mine was worked from 1856 to 1884.

== Atomic Energy Authority ==
In 1877 a company called Kit Hill Tunnel Ltd began work on both the south and north sides of the hill to create a tunnel which would be 2 miles (3.2 km) long. The southern portal was at Silver Hill, and that at the north was near a small mine called Excelsior. However, due to the toughness of the underlying bedrock, progress was costly and slow, and ceased about a year later. In 1881 a new company named Kit Hill Great Consols took over the setts of Kit Hill United and Excelsior mine. They deepened the North Engine Shaft to 112 fathoms and lengthened the tunnel running south to meet it. However, this too was proving too costly, and wound up in 1885, before it was half-way complete. Several later attempts were made to extend the Excelsior Tunnel, but by 1938, it was still only 2,400 feet (730 m) long.

However, in 1959 the Atomic Energy Authority took over operations, and used the tunnel for underground explosions. The activities were part of Operation Orpheus, and the Kit Hill events were the first part:

- Phase A: Small charges fired in a 6 ft (1.8 m) diameter cavity in granite and shale at depths of 100 to 300 feet (91 m) in the Excelsior Tunnel at Kit Hill.
- Phase B: Participation in the Operation Cowboy tests, where charges of 3,000 lb (1,400 kg) would be detonated in 30 ft (9.1 m) diameter cavities at depths of 800 ft (240 m) in a salt mine in Louisiana, United States.
- Phase C: The tests at Greenside Mine in Cumbria, where a 3,000 lb (1,400 kg) decoupled test and a 1,100 lb (500 kg) coupled test would be carried out in andesite rock at a depth below surface of 1,700 ft (520 m) and the results compared. The charge sizes were chosen so that if the decoupling worked as predicted, the seismic signals would be similar in intensity.

== Railways ==
Construction of The Tamar, Kit Hill & Callington Railway started in 1864. The name was later changed to the East Cornwall Mineral Railway, and the line opened in 1872. Seven and a half miles long, it ran from Calstock's river frontage, past Kelly Quay & Drakewalls and the Gunnislake quarries, along the northern flank of Hingston Down to below Kit Hill at Kelly Bray, where an inclined tramway connected with it. It amalgamated with the Plymouth, Devonport and South Western Junction Railway crossing the Tamar above Calstock and onto the junction at Bere Alston.

The Gunnislake to Bere Alston section still survives as part of the Tamar Valley Line.

Some remnants, mainly the granite blocks, of the line can be found on the northern slopes of the Country Park site.
