= Wolfenstein (rock) =

Isolated rock formation in Bavaria, Germany

Coordinates: 49°52′9.94″N 12°18′20.04″E

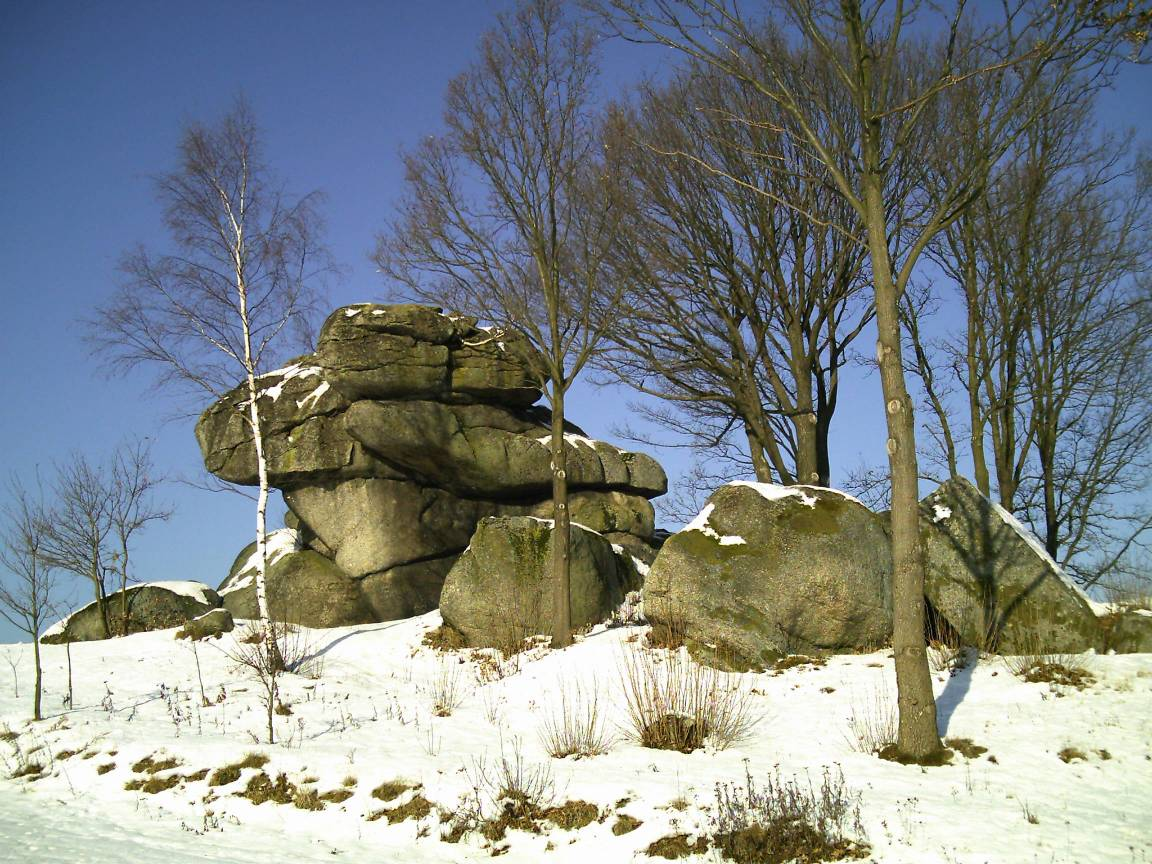
Wolfenstein rock

The Wolfenstein is an isolated rock formation, located between Tirschenreuth and Hohenwald in Bavaria.

Due to erosion, the granite blocks appear to look like a pile of bags.

"Wolfenstein" translates roughly into 'Wolf-Stone'

== See also ==
- Tor (geography)
