= Hingston Down =

Hill in Cornwall, England

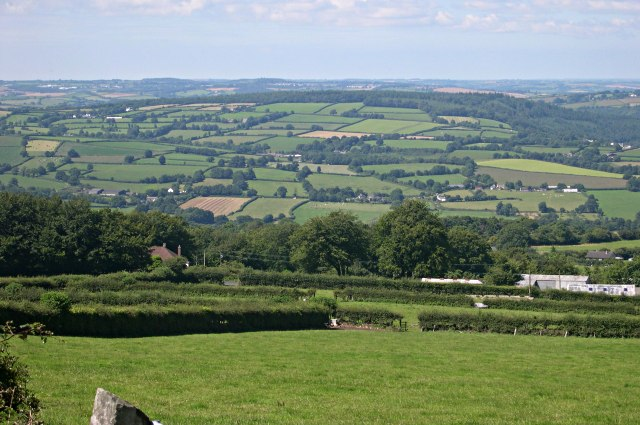
The northern slope of Hingston Down.

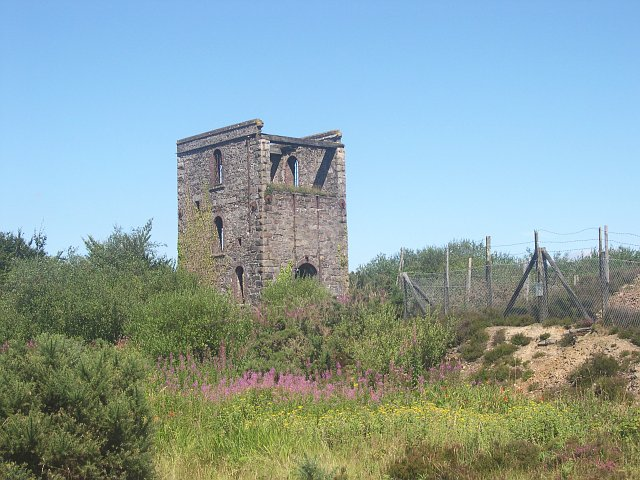
Engine house on Hingston Down.

Hingston Down is a hill not far from Gunnislake in Cornwall, England, United Kingdom. It is the subject of an old rhyme, due to the prolific tin mining that formerly took place in the area:

Hingston Down well ywrought
Is worth London Town dearly bought.

This Hingston Down should not be confused with the Hingston Down at 50.661°N 3.746°W, a hill spur about a mile east of the town of Moretonhampstead in the neighbouring county of Devon.

== History ==
The hill is usually accepted as the place mentioned in an entry in the Anglo-Saxon Chronicle for 835 (corrected by scholars to 838) which says that Ecgberht king of the West Saxons defeated an army of Vikings and Cornish at the Battle of Hingston Down (Hengestdūn = "Stallion Hill").

== Geology ==
The Hingston Down Consols mine on the hill is the type locality for the mineral Arthurite, which was discovered here. There is also a quarry on the hill, which forms the Hingston Down Quarry & Consols Site of Special Scientific Interest, noted for its mineralisation. Parts of the land designated as Hingston Down Quarry & Consols SSSI are owned by the Duchy of Cornwall.

== See also ==
- Kit Hill Country Park
