= Legio Maria =

New religious movement in Kenya

- Formation: 1961
- Type: New religious movement, African initiated church, Independent Catholic syncretism
- Headquarters: St. Mary Basilica church, Got Kwer; also Got Okwon'g, Migori, Kenya.
- Members: est. 3.5–4 million
- Official language: commonly Luo, English, Swahili and Latin in Mass
- Lodvikus: Baba Simeo Lodvikus Melkio Ondetto
- Key people: Pope Timotheo Atila, Pope Lawrence Chiaji, Pope Rafael Adika, Pope Romanus Ong'ombe, Pope Lawrence Ochieng, Cardinal Otang, Cardinal Deacon Maurice Akelo, Cardinal Abala Rafael, Cardinal Paul M Kitili, Arch-Bishop Romanus Odongo, Bishop Petro Onyango Abuto, Bishop Daniel Ayot
- Budget: Kenya shilling 21 million annually
- Staff: over 700 priests, 120 bishops, 29 cardinals, and a pope

Legio Maria (ungrammatical Latin, "Legion of Mary")—also known as Legio Maria of African Church Mission, and Maria Legio—is an African initiated church or new religious movement among the Luo people of western Kenya. It emerged as an extension of an interpretation of the Three Secrets of Fátima to a new, specifically African, context. The religious movement was initiated by repeated appearances of a mystic woman to several Catholic Church members delivering messages about the incarnation of the Son of God as a black man. These appearances are said to have begun around 1938, almost simultaneous with the beginning of Edel Quinn's lay Catholic mission for the similarly named Legion of Mary to Africa.

By the early 1960s, the movement had assembled a good number of catechists, acolytes, and believers in a spiritual return of Jesus Christ. The continuous expansion of this movement coupled with its belief in Simeo Ondetto as the returned Son of God led to theological tension, and eventual break with the lay Catholic movement, the Legion of Mary. Legio Maria was legally registered in Kenya in 1966 as a church, expanded massively in the late 1960s, 1970s, and 1980s, and eventually spread to many countries in Africa, including Uganda, Tanzania, Congo, Zaire, Rwanda, Ethiopia, Sudan, and Nigeria. In 1966, one of its founders, Mama Maria, died and was buried at Efeso Church, in Nzoia, Siaya County, while the principal founder, Simeo Ondetto, died in 1991 and was buried in Got Calvary, in Migori County.

Baba Simeo Lodvikus Simeo Melkio Ondetto, eternal spiritual mediator of Legio Maria, Jerusalem church in Migori, 1988

== History ==
=== Formation ===
Legio Maria developed gradually and eventually separated from the Catholic Church in 1963. What is now Legio Maria started originally separated from the Catholic lay movement Legion of Mary as far back as 1938–1940. Central to its formation are the local Luo myths about a mystery woman, min Omolo Ka-Nyunja, who walked Luo land during these years. A number of Legio Maria faithfuls believe that this woman was responsible for the mythical stories such as Nyamgondho Kombare in Gwassi, Homa Bay County, and Simbi Nyaima in Karachuonyo, Homa Bay County. According to Bishop Abuto, a Legio Maria cleric and researcher, "every religion has mythical elements and the Legio Maria movement's development relied massively on the crystallization of local myths with their beliefs."

=== Demographics ===
In 1963 a movement of dissatisfied Catholics in south Nyanza Province left the Diocese of Kisii and formed the Legio Maria Church, or Legion of Mary Church, under the leadership of the Lodvikus Simeo Melkio Ondetto and an old mystic woman named Mama Maria. This mystic woman is the one Legio Maria adherents relate with the Fátima Secrets. She is believed to have called a number of Catholics to the new movement by visionary appearances, telling them to look forward to her son who had come to Africa. Her spiritual son, Simeo Ondetto, was then a catechist in Roman Catholic Church. Ondetto was excommunicated by the Catholic Church in the 1960s. By 1980 the church numbered 248,000 adherents. Government estimates at the time of the split from the Catholic Church stated that there were nearly 90,000 followers of Legio Maria. By 1968, it had become a member of the East African United Churches.

The Legio Maria Church was not the only church schism among the Luo people in the early years of Kenyan independence. Catholic missionaries had been working among the Luo for 61 years before the 1963 split. By 1966 there were 31 "distinct Luo separatist churches registered with the Kenyan Government." B Across Kenya, "by 1966 there were 160 distinct bodies with a total of 600,000 adherents, most of whom were formerly members of the Protestant or Catholic Churches," with the Legion of Mary Church being the largest of the schisms from the Catholic Church. As of 2004, estimates of the number of Legio Maria adherents were roughly just over three million. In this regard, the Legio Maria Church is one of the most resilient and successful of the African-initiated churches.

While the Legio Maria Church began exclusively as a movement among the Luo people, it is now found all over Kenya and even has significant numbers of communities among the Turkana, Kalenjin, Kamba and Luhya peoples of Kenya and in Tanzania, Uganda, Rwanda, Burundi, DRC, and Ethiopia. In 1979, the word "mission" was added to the church's official name, becoming the "Legio Maria of African Church Mission."

=== Origins of the movement ===
According to Legio Maria leaders and researchers, the origins of the movement can be traced to the convergence of at least four separate events: the concealment by the Roman Catholic Church of 'the third secret of Fátima;' the visions of Mary to several people informing them of the coming of her son; Simeo Ondetto's supernatural attributes that established him as a spiritual leader; the coming of the Holy Spirit at the home of John Baru in Suna Migori and the Spirit's declaration that Simeo Ondetto is the incarnated son of God; and several miracles and wonders that accompanied the mission of Ondetto, Mary, and numberless Legio Prophets.

==== The Third Secret of Fátima ====
The Three Secrets of Fátima are related to a number of appearances of Mary to three shepherd children in 1917 at Fátima, Portugal. It was there that Mary revealed three secrets to the shepherds. The Catholic Church released the first two secrets in the 1940s but the surviving shepherd did not write down the third secret until 1944. She sealed the envelope and instructed the church to not open the secret until 1960. The Legio Maria Church believes that Church officials in Rome refused to release the true secret because it revealed Mary's prophecy of a Black Christ for Africa. Schwartz recounts the theory:

Angry at Rome, Mary decided to 'walk away from those people'. She determined apparitions no longer sufficed. She would tread on African soil as a person with her Son. Colorless in Heaven, both would become black Africans and bring her message directly to a more receptive audience. Legios declared 'The Third Secret of Fatima' was about the mission of the son of God in Africa, the coming of Legio, and the beginning of a new religious age.

In 2000, the Catholic Church released the official third secret of Fátima alongside a commentary on the meaning of the secret written by then Cardinal Joseph Ratzinger.

=== Dead and risen ===
While at Sagegi in 1958, serving as a Catholic catechist, and living in the home of another catechist known as Petrus Pitalis Ogeka, Simeo Ondetto is said to have died for 3 days and came back to life with a mission-focused approach. After rising from death, Ondetto began to call himself the son of God. He was now preaching that he had gone to confer with God the Father about his mission and was freed to begin his mission. He describes a visit to heaven, chats with saints, angels, and God. Simeo Ondetto permitted the baptism of polygamists and the baptism of old Catholic converts without going through catechism training. He also said that he was sent to start a church called Legio Maria.

==== Appearances of the Virgin Mary ====
According to early adherents of Legio Maria, the Virgin Mary began appearing among the Luo people in the late 1920s. In their accounts, they say that she first appeared as an extraordinary itinerary woman. At a time estimated to be around 1935, this woman was walking at Awendo market in South Nyanza, when an empathizing tailor known as Omollo who was the son of Nyunja of Alego, Udida, gave her a dress gift. This woman is said to have promised Omollo an eternal name among the Luos. From that day on she began calling herself the mother of Omollo. By the 1940s, this woman is claimed to have visited the Catholic parish of Nyandago and conversed with over five members of its clergy about the mission of Ondetto. However, priests at Nyandago mission discounted the supposed apparitions, stating that Mary could not appear as a Black African.

Legio tradition tells of Mary and her son being incarnated as Luo in the beginning of the 1900s, with Mary entering into an earlier time period than Jesus. Mary wandered throughout Luo land during this time, performing healings and other miracles; the church was officially organised "when the 90-year-old Mary and her adult spiritual Son, Simeo Ondetto, were reunited in Suna, South Nyanza followed by the coming of the Holy Spirit(Mount the World Has Opened to the Light)." Schwartz recounts that the "Black Mary 'returned to Heaven' on 23 December 1966, and that those who met her claimed "direct personal experience of Mary's disclosure of the meanings of the 'Third Secret of Fatima,'" in which it was revealed that "the Virgin Mary brought a new liberating religion for the world through an African Mission!" At nearly 90 years of age, from 1963 to 1966, the mystical Mary could not reach many places. This resulted in the confusion of Gaudencia Aoko, a prophet, with Mama Maria, the harbinger who prepared the world for the coming of her son.

=== Birth and early life of Simeo Ondetto ===
Born in around 1926 to Luo parents, Margaret Aduwo and Obimbo Misumba, Simeo Ondetto grew up in Angoro village, Kano location, near the Nyanza-Rift Valley border. He was named Ondetto by his parents and later got baptised as Simeo after years of studying catechism. According to his brother, Nelson Owino Obimbo, a Legio Maria Cardinal Dean (2011), Simeo was an extraordinary child. Owino who is older than Ondetto lists around six childhood miracles performed by Ondetto while young. Ondetto left their home in Awasi as a young man, worked at Miwani Sugar Company in Western Kenya for a short duration before moving to Tanzania Mara to stay with his relatives there. Around 1955, Ondetto returned home in Awasi, only focused on a missionary life. To find a way of keeping him home, his parents called a meeting that resolved that the only way to keep him home was to have him get married. Ondetto declined the offer of a wife and instead kept a life of solitude and meditation. He moved to Sagegi to live with a catholic catechist before starting the Legio movement.

== Official hierarchy ==
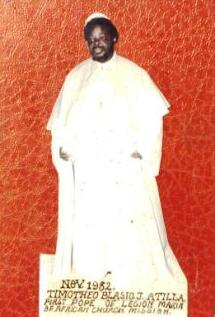
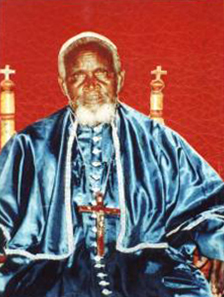
The first two (undisputed) popes

The full official title for Simeo Ondetto became Baba Simeo Lodvikus Melkio, the eternal spiritual leader and mediator of Legio Maria.

The administrative duties of the church were put under a Pope. So far, there have been five such popes:

- Pope Timothy Joseph Blasio Atila (1963–1998)
- Pope Maria Pius Lawrence Jairo Chiaji K'Adera (1998–2004)
- Pope Raphael Titus Otieno (2004–present)

By 2009, there were differences in Legio Maria that led to the consecration of a Cardinal Romanus Alphonse Ong'ombe, going against the order of succession placed by Simeo Ondetto and enforced by Our Lady. The differences between the two leaders has taken Legio Maria to the courts more than three times, and the differences still persist. According to Bishop Peter Onyango Abuto of Nairobi Diocese, the differences will end soon. "Simeo Ondetto has foretold those differences and said that Legio Maria's unity will return under the third pope." Under the popes are over 500 deacons, 350 priests, 60 bishops, 21 archbishops and 17 cardinals. Currently, all these lower hierarchies swear allegiance to the different sides led by Adika and On'gombe. Some notable people on the On'gombe side are On'gawo Aloo (Cardinal Camerlengo), Owino Obimbo (Cardinal Dean—deceased), Romanus Odongo (Arch-bishop-Rongo), the late Susana nyar Ouma (Ondetto's cook), and Bishop Melkio. Notable people on Adika's side are Cardinal Joseph Atieno (Dean of Cardinals), Maurice Akello (Cardinal Deacon), Bishop Peter Onyango Abuto, Elias Komenya, Mother Dorina (Ka-Baru, and Hellena nyar Rosari. A parallel hierarchy to the male priesthood is the Legio Maria women priesthood that is led by Nuns (Mothers). Legio nuns are married women who are ordained. The lowest female rank in Legio Maria church is sisterhood, then mother (heads a mission), superior mother (heads a diocese), arch mother (heads an arch diocese), and Dean mother (head of legio mothers). Below the clergy are church teachers and church administrators who are elected by the faithful. Prophets are also core to the Legio Maria mission because the church is Spirit Initiated.

History of Baba Messiah According to Legio Maria teaching Simeo Ondetto is the son of God sent to establish the glory of God on earth. Legio Maria believes in dispensations or times when God has stepped into human history after the fall of man. The first is found in the Old Testament "when the High Priest Melchizedek appeared to Abraham. Melchizedek established a reign of a monotheistic awareness which ended with the arrival of Jesus. The dispensation established by Jesus was one of recognising the trinity, of individual salvation, and established universal barometer of religion which is love. Instead of the law, the second dispensation is characterised by love. The third dispensation is the reign of God established by Simeo Ondetto as Lodvikus, that is the son of God sent to show the glory of God to the World. In Legio Maria theology, the second person of the trinity has appeared in history three times: as Melchizedek Son of God to define the history of the human redemption by blessing God's chosen race through Abraham; as Jesus to conclude the mission of redemption, opening it and teaching the core element which is love; and as Simeo Lodvikus, to reveal the glory of life after death and the nature of God. To Legio Maria faithfuls, Simeo Ondetto, Jesus of Nazareth and Melchizedek are one and the same person incarnated during different dispensations of human history. Simeo Ondetto is known as the Lodvikus or The Glory of God, whose role is to bring the world to understand the hidden treasures of life after death and dramatise the reality of eternal life. According to Legio Maria the promise by Jesus to return has been fulfilled by the coming of Simeo. Legio Maria also seems not to believe in a final judgement of the whole world. They believe in immediate judgement of individuals immediately after death. This is supported by the long list of adored Legio saints. Some of the official Legio Maria saints include Timotheo Atila, Maria Ombwayo, Tobias Oongo, Petro Otieno, Mumbo Carilus and Angi Clement. Church leaders distinguish Messias Simeo Ondetto's mission as separate from that of Jesus. He was not sent to replace Jesus, for Jesus was a name given to the son of God when he accomplished a second dispensational mission. Instead, Messias Simeo Ondetto is God incarnated in another context, specifically for the third dispensation of the glory of God. Often, 1 John 4:1 is used as biblical support for the confession that God has again come into the flesh through Messias Simeo Ondetto, for "every spirit which confesses that Jesus Christ has come in the flesh is of God and every Spirit that does not confess Jesus is not of God…Therefore we say that Jesus has come in the flesh. Finding Africa in the yoke of colonialism, Simeo is also talked of as a saviour from the oppression of colonialism and "healer and protector from the evils of witchcraft." Simeo Ondetto is not seen merely God's messenger, but as "the actual embodiment of God in history."

In their affirmation that Messias Simeo Ondetto is the Black Messiah, the Legio Maria do not exclude the possibility and reality that the Messiah has been incarnated in multiple times and contexts. In interviews during her three years researching the Legio Maria Church, Nancy Schwartz relates,

most Legios insisted to me that theirs was not the only way to choose light and Heaven. The Baba Messias Ondetto had preached that 'God is a polygynist' who loves 'all the houses in his home'. All religions, he had said, are akin to 'branches of a tree that bears fruit'. Legios reiterated that black and white people could both get to Heaven, if they followed their faiths.

Thus, salvation is available through other religions and revelations of God. While the Legio are clear that God has provided specific revelations and even incarnations for different peoples of the world, this does not translate into an exclusivist position in which only adherents of Legio Maria will be with God in heaven. According to Schwartz, "most Legios affirmed that Heaven was a place where the Father, Son, Holy Spirit, Mary, saints, angels and Old Testament prophets and patriarchs are without color, a place where there is nothing like Mzungu (European/white person) and African." She concludes that the Legio Maria Church has "formulat[ed] their own version of an anti-racist black liberation theology," which is unique.

== Practices ==
=== Strict holiness ===
As an AIC, some aspects of African traditional religion and beliefs are incorporated into the church, including the early revelation to Simeo Ondetto that polygamists could be baptised into the church. In this sense, the church is more willing to accept some cultural practices, but this is balanced by a strict sense of holiness. According to Dirven, there are also "rigorous and legalistic taboos to drinking, smoking, dancing and wearing shoes in holy places – trumpeted as the essence of a strict moral code."

=== Gifts of the Holy Spirit ===
Essentially Legio Maria is a spirit-reliant religious movement. All the adherents respect the spirit as the guide of Legio. Even while the Simeo Ondetto and the Black Mary were still alive, it was possible for them to be in one place in Kenya while teaching and visiting other adherents through spirit delivered teachings of glossolalia and holy spirit possessing prophets to convey messages from them . It is a very serious offence to falsify the retelling of encounters with the holy ones in a glossolalia. Such actions could lead to an official rebuke from the priest, or even a beating, called a chwat, from one's local community.

The spirit also provide direction for the individuals in regard to spiritual discipline practices and outward garments. While many AICs require adherents to exclusively wear white robes when worshipping, the Legio Maria church encourages adherents to listen for messages from angels in their dreams in regard to the color of robe they should wear. Schwartz recounts the varied meanings of these dream inspired colours:

The spirit can lead Legios to acquire robes of yellow, a range of blues, purple, green, red, brown and other colours that are associated with various spiritual gifts and patron saints. Black is for ordained male priests (padri, pl. pate) and church mothers (madha, padri madhako, pl. mathe, pate mamon). Legio priests and church mothers wear black robes at requiem masses and at graveside services held in family compounds. At happier times, black prayer beads are worn or carried by church mothers and priests as a metonym of power and ordained status. A few non-ordained men and women said they had the black beads on their house altars because a dream had directed them to get the beads and pray with them at home. The dream-bestowed black beads were a source of quiet pride to these Legios.

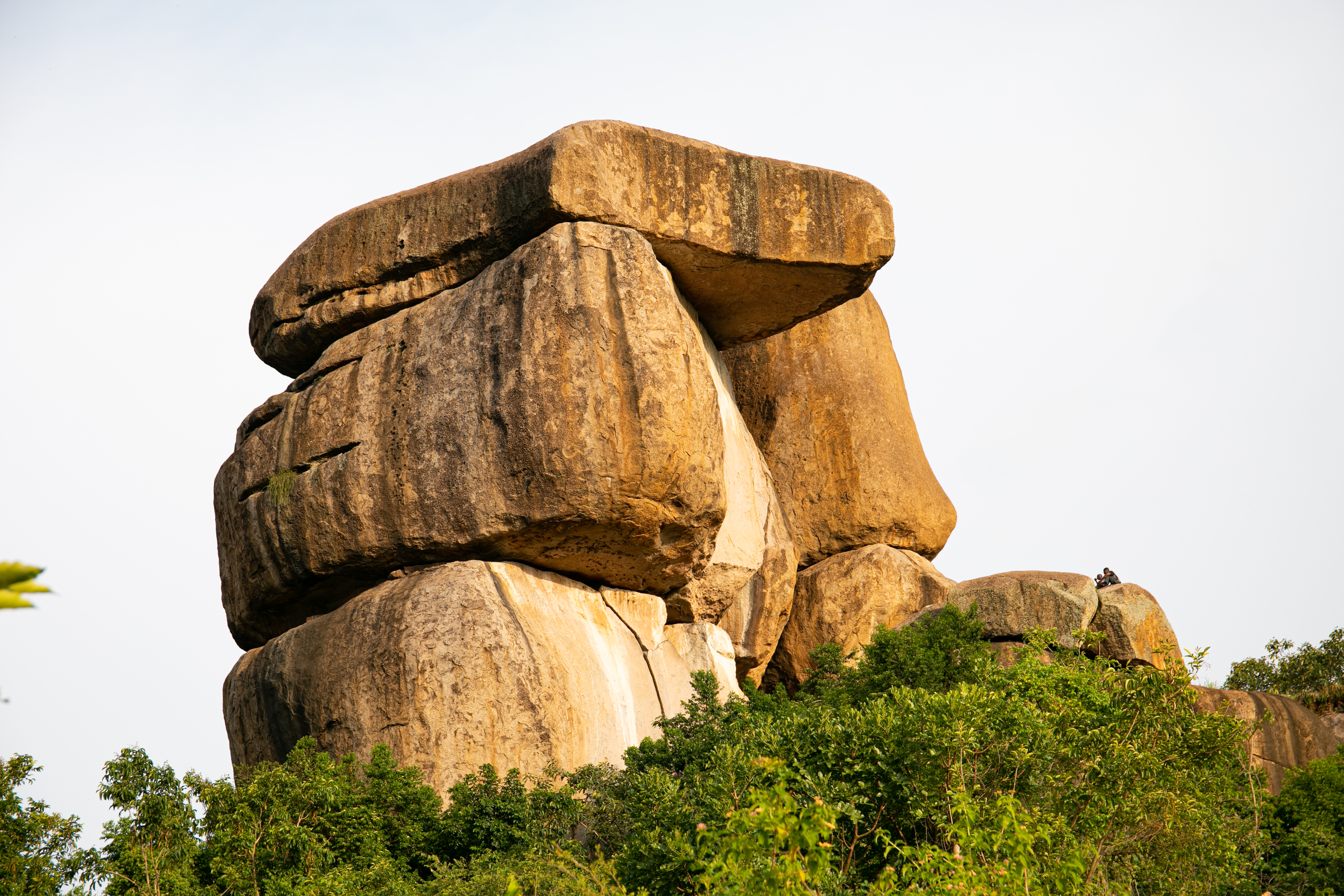
Kit-Mikayi

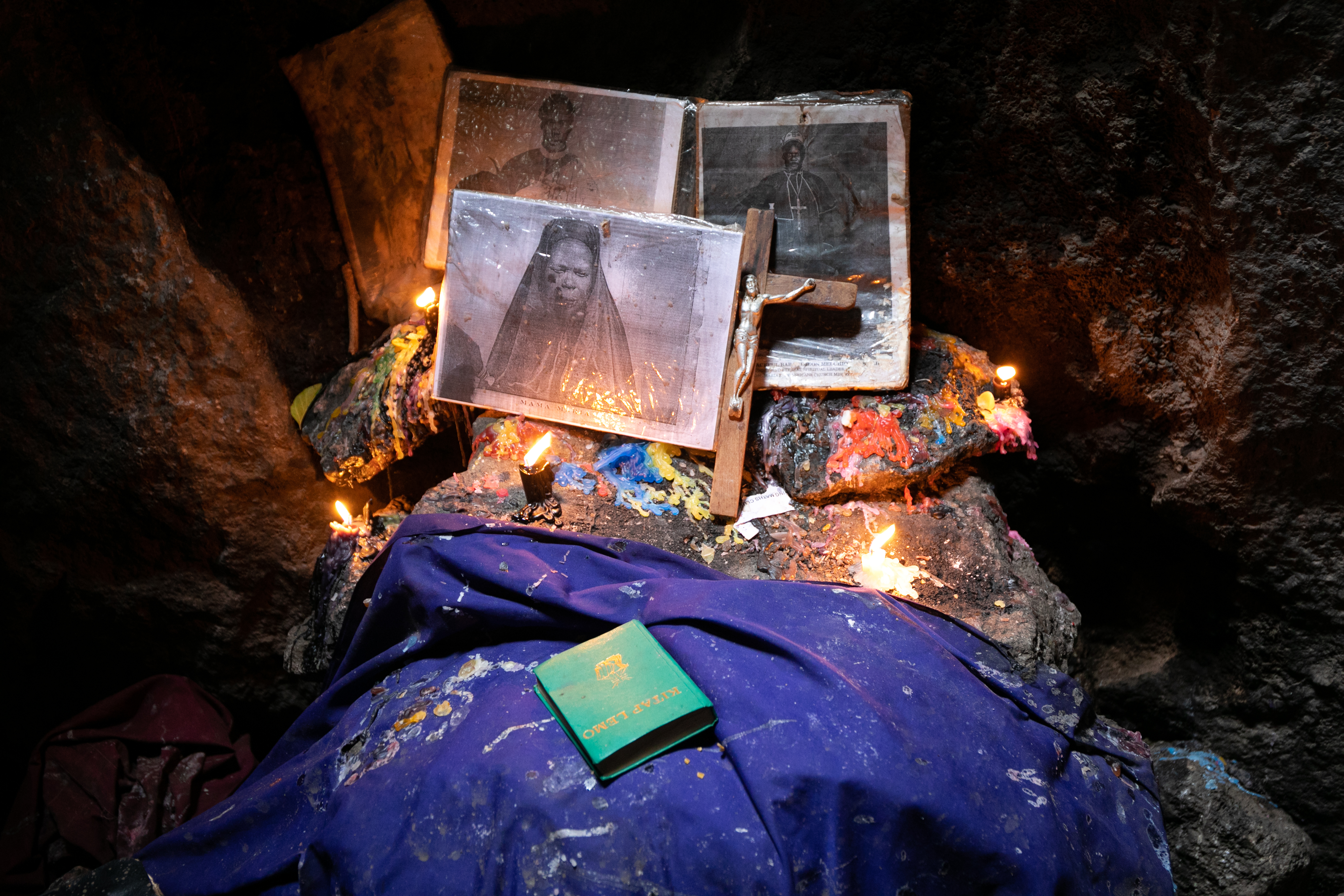
Prayer chamber

=== Holy sites ===
Some make pilgrimages to sites such as Kit-Mikayi, a rock formation, to pray and fast.

== Similarity with Catholicism ==
The Legio Maria Church recognises salvation through Jesus Christ, the Son of God. The discontinuity with orthodox theology is that the Son of God has been incarnated in multiple contexts, rejecting the orthodox doctrine of Christ taking a human body and soul for eternity. None of these incarnations are considered exclusive; they only serve to reveal Christ to people of different contexts. All who are saved through any of these incarnations of Christ will worship God together in heaven. Thus, for the Legio Church, salvation is found through Christ, as revealed in their particular Messias Simeo Ondetto.

Legio Maria also recognises an active spiritual realm that needs to be dealt with to respond to evil and illness. It is God who gives gifts to people for spiritual healing, sometimes through the saints. The Legio specifically recognise the Catholic saints Catherine of Siena and Bernadette of Lourdes in regard to spiritual healing. The saints Samson and Julian and the archangel Michael help to "guide Legios with gifts for exorcism and battling witchcraft.

Many of the liturgies of the Legio Maria are heavily derived from Roman Rite practices within the Catholic Church. These include Legio Maria communities that celebrate variations of the Tridentine Mass. In addition, original Legio songs are added that reinforce the particularity of the Legio Maria church.

Another sign of continuity with the Catholic Church is that the Legio Maria include a white Catholic priest, Father Philip Chefa, among their saints. Serving at the Asumbi Roman Catholic mission station in the 1930s, Chefa was "highly charismatic," engaging "in healing, exorcism, and the burning of paraphernalia associated with 'witchcraft.'" Chefa introduced the Catholic Legion of Mary to Luo in 1938.

== See also ==
- African-initiated church
- New religious movement
