= Gaudencia Aoko =

Kenyan religious leader

Gaudencia Aoko (1943–2018 or 2019) was a Kenyan religious leader who helped lead two African-initiated churches. She was heavily involved with the early development of Legio Maria.

== Early life and education ==
Aoko was born in Wangaya, a community near the town of Awasi in Nyanza Province, Kenya in July 1943. Little is known about her early life other than that she had three siblings, was the second-youngest child, and was poorly educated.

== Career ==
After separating from her husband and the deaths of their children, Aoko said that she had a vision where she was commanded by Jesus and Mary to establish Legio Maria. She "insisted" that the church was Catholic, but that "they were Catholics in Africa not in Europe". Aoko was renamed "Gaudencia" and travelled back to Kenya to meet Simeon Ondeto and his mother in the town of Suna to found the new religious movement and church. Some sources note that Aoko did not consider herself a co-founder of the church. However, Ayiecho Olweny, a Kenyan politician, said that “Aoko is the bona-fide founder of Legio Maria. I have known her for many years. She was shoved aside because she was tough and radical." Church officials disagreed with his assertion.

Aoko began work to baptize people living in South Nyanza and preach according to Legio Maria. The church grew quickly, claiming to have around 100,000 members within a year of its foundation. Aoko played a major role in the church's early growth, and was described as a "charismatic" leader, preaching to large crowds across a wide area. As her influence grew in the region, she began to advocate for "moral reform", at times going against the Catholic church.

Aoko also had to fight to keep her role in the church known, as men tried to "marginalize" her. By the late 1960s her role had been shrunk and the church's rules were changed so that only men could be priests. Aoko left the church and after several attempts founded a separate "Communion Church" in 1971. The Dictionary of African Biography says that she "remained an influential religious leader and continued to defy convention". However, Aoko largely avoided publicity after leaving Legio Maria. She was considered a "female husband" by some close to her, had three wives and held some authority that was traditionally given to men.

== Personal life ==
Aoko married Simeon Ondeto in 1957 in a partnership which had been arranged by her father. The couple moved to Bugire in northern Tanganyika around 1960 where Aoko was baptized into the Catholic church at a local mission. Aoko had two children with her husband. They died on the same day in early 1963 and the couple was divorced shortly after.

== Death ==
Aoko died in late 2018 or early 2019.
