= Down Tor =

Tor in England

Coordinates: 50°30′26″N 4°00′14″W

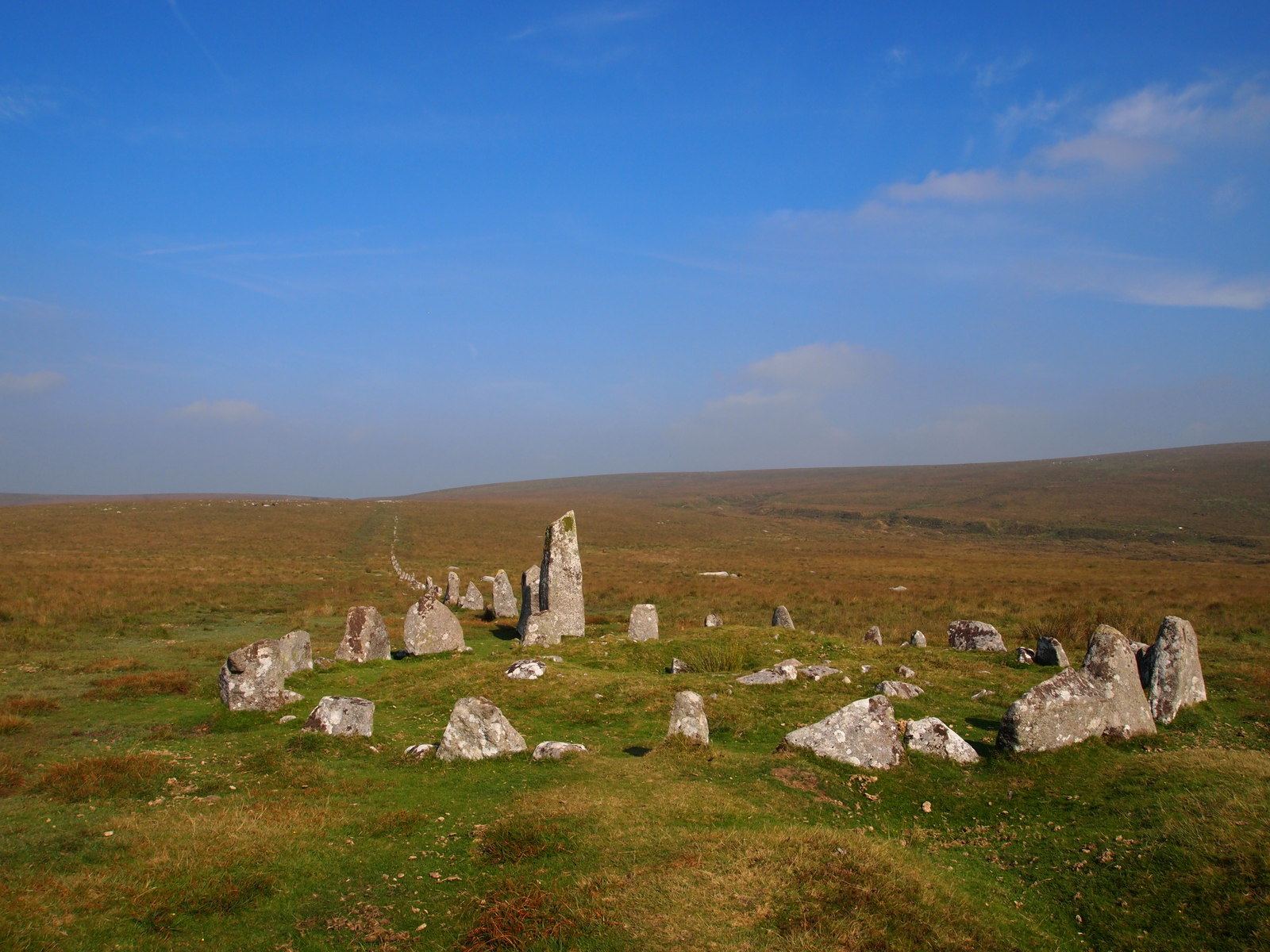
Down Tor Stone Circle and Row

Down Tor is a tor on Dartmoor, England, at GR 581694, height 366 metres (1,201 ft), overlooking Burrator Reservoir.
