= Kit-Mikayi =

Tor in western Kenya

Coordinates: 0°07′04″S 34°32′26″E

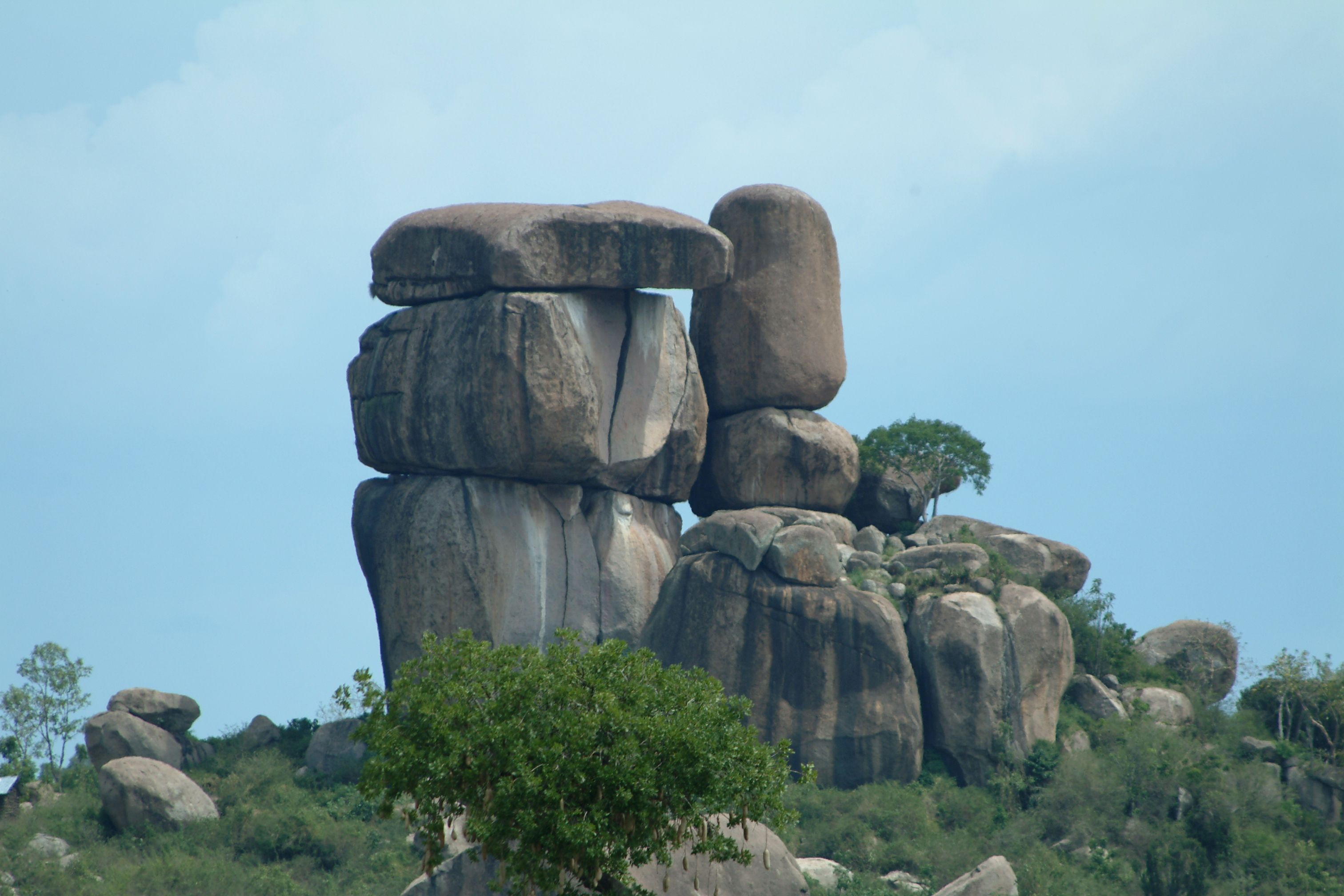
Kit-Mikayi in Kisumu in western Kenya.

Kit-Mikayi — also spelled Kit Mikayi, Kitmikayi, and Kitmikaye — is a rock formation, a tor, around 120 m high situated about 29 km west of the town of Kisumu in western Kenya. It is about 1 km from the Kisumu-Bondo road. The sign board is on the gate of Kit Mikayi primary school and entrance is via N’gop-Ngeso primary school.

Kit-mikayi means "the stone of the first woman", or "stone of the first wife", in Dholuo, the Luo language.

== Legends ==
The legend behind Kit Mikayi, which in Luo dialect means "the stone of the first wife", is that: Long time ago, there was an old man by the name Ngeso who was in great love with the stone. Every day when he woke up in the morning, he could walk into the cave inside the stone and stay there the whole day, and this could force his wife to bring him breakfast and lunch every day. The old man became passionately in love with this stone to the extent that when people asked his wife his whereabouts, she would answer that he has gone to his first wife (Mikayi) hence the stone of the first wife (Kit Mikayi).

An explanation of the shape of this unique stone is that the structure represents the Luo cultural polygamous family which had the first wife's house (Mikayi) built further in between on the right hand side was the second wife's house (Nyachira) while the third wife's house (Reru) was built on the left hand side of the homestead.

This rock is also seen to have a nuclear family whereby the father (Ngeso) being the middle stone followed by the bulky Mikayi (first wife), then Nyachira (second wife) followed by Reru (third wife) and further in front they have the child which is representing Simba (which is the house for the first born boy in the homestead). From a long time, this stone has been a sacred place for the villagers to worship in times of trouble.

== Significance ==
Locals living around the stones are known as the Luo-Kakello clan. The site is associated with sacrifices and many legends from pre-Christian times, especially stories explaining the meaning of the name.

Kit-Mikayi is a regional point of sightseeing interest, especially among the neighbouring Luo tribes. It also has become a popular local pilgrimage site for followers of the Legio Maria sect who come to the rock to pray and fast for several weeks at a time.

UNESCO inscribed it under the ICH 2003 Convention, on the list of intangible heritage in need of urgent safeguarding, on 11 December 2019.
