= Hawk's Tor =

Hawk's Tor may refer to:

- Hawk's Tor, Blisland (307 m), a hill on Bodmin Moor, Cornwall, England
- Hawk's Tor, North Hill (329 m), a hill on Bodmin Moor, Cornwall, England

== See also ==
- Tor House and Hawk Tower, built by poet Robinson Jeffers in California
