= Hensbarrow =

Natural region of Cornwall, England

Coordinates: 50.3872°N 4.8221°W

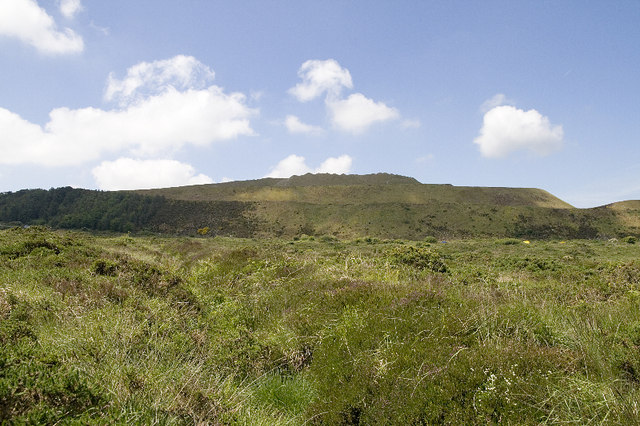
Hensbarrow Downs

Hensbarrow (Cornish: Krugewik, meaning hind barrow) is a natural region in Cornwall, England, UK, that has been recognized as National Character Area 154 by Natural England.

Hensbarrow is an upland region covering an area of just under 12,000 hectares immediately north of St Austell. It is bounded in the north by the A30 road and runs from Retew and Treviscoe in the west to Redmoor and Penpillick in the east. It is the remnant of a much larger exposed and windswept heather moorland. Its lower, more sheltered areas are covered by irregular livestock fields enclosed by Cornish hedges of stone walls, with scattered hamlets and farmsteads. China clay pits, sand tips and mica dams occupy much of the central area. Its highest natural point is Hensbarrow Beacon (1025 ft).

The Database of British Hills lists the following summits in the Hensbarrow area with at least 30 metres topographic prominence. The majority of these summits are landscaped spoil heaps.

1. Hensbarrow Downs (364.6m)
2. Great Longstone Hill (344.4m)
3. Carrancarrow Hill (335m)
4. Greensplat Hill (333m)
5. Longstone Downs (319.9m)
6. Watch Hill (319m)
7. Whitemoor (292.9m)
8. Carluddon Pyramid (285.4m)
9. Caerloggas Downs (283.2m)
10. Trelavour Pyramid (267m)
11. Ruddle Moor (260.4m)
12. Brewers Hill Pyramid (258m)
13. Rostowrack Downs (247m)
14. Treviscoe Hill (247m)
15. Goonamarth Pyramid (243m)
16. Carclaze Downs (234.4m)
17. Penhale Hill (226m)
18. Fraddon Down (222m)
19. Goonamarris North Hill (218m)
20. Goonamarris South Hill (217m)
21. St Stephen's Beacon (212m)
22. Melbur Mound (209m)
23. Trerank Moor (193.4m)
24. Halwyn Pyramid (189m)
25. Treskilling Downs (160m)

The topography of Hensbarrow has been changed beyond recognition by human activity (specifically open-cast china clay mining and the associated spoil heaps) to a degree completely without precedent in the rest of the United Kingdom. The number of distinct summits has greatly increased, and as may be seen from the list above, no fewer than six artificial hills overtop the original highest point of the area (Hensbarrow Beacon at 312m).
