= Tor (rock formation) =

Large, free-standing rock outcrop on a gentle hill summit

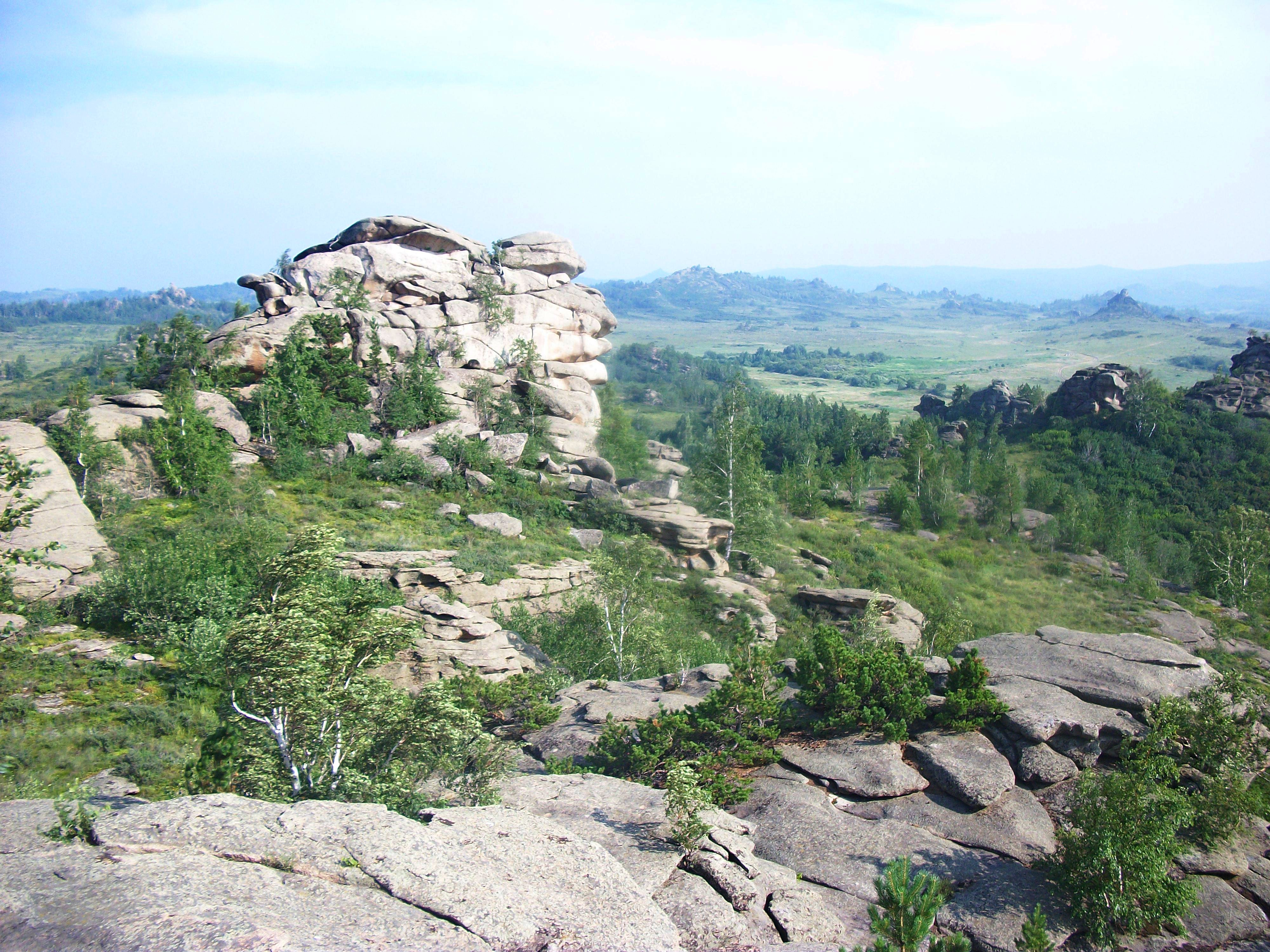
A tor in Altai Krai, southern Siberia

A tor, which is also known by geomorphologists as either a castle koppie or kopje, is a large, free-standing rock outcrop that rises abruptly from the surrounding smooth and gentle slopes of a rounded hill summit or ridge crest. In the South West of England, the term is commonly also used for the hills themselves – particularly the high points of Dartmoor in Devon and Bodmin Moor in Cornwall.

== Etymology ==
Although English topographical names often have a Celtic etymology, the Oxford English Dictionary lists no cognates to the Old English word in either the Breton or Cornish languages (the Scottish Gaelic tòrr is thought to derive from the Old English word). It is therefore accepted that the English word Tor derives from the Old Welsh word tẁrr or twr, meaning a cluster or heap.

== Formation ==
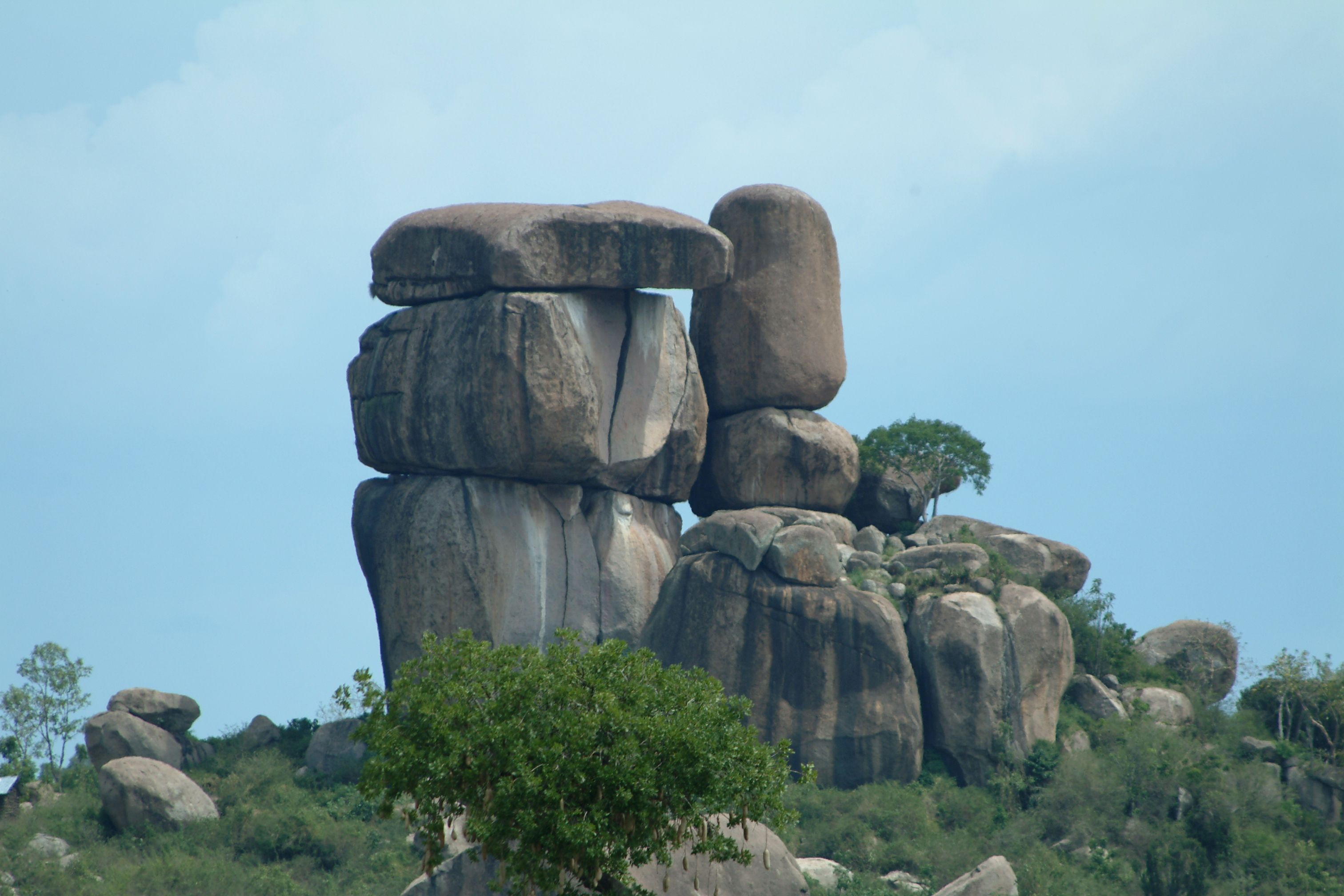
Kit-Mikayi, a celebrated tor near Kisumu, Kenya

Tors are landforms created by the erosion and weathering of rock, most commonly granites but also schists, dacites, dolerites, ignimbrites, coarse sandstones and others. Tors are mostly less than 5 meters (16 ft) high. Many hypotheses have been proposed to explain their origin and this remains a topic of discussion among geologists, geomorphologists and physical geographers. It is considered likely that tors were created by geomorphic processes that differed widely in type and duration according to regional and local differences in climate and rock types.

For example the Dartmoor granite was emplaced around 280 million years ago. When the cover rocks eroded away it was exposed to chemical and physical weathering processes. Where joints are closely spaced, the large crystals in the granite readily disintegrate to form a sandy regolith known locally as growan. This is readily stripped off by solifluction or surface wash when not protected by vegetation, notably during prolonged cold phases during the Quaternary ice ages – periglaciation.

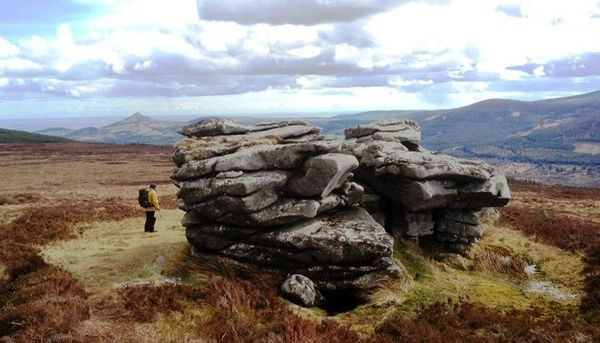
Tor near the summit of Knocknagun, in Wicklow, Ireland

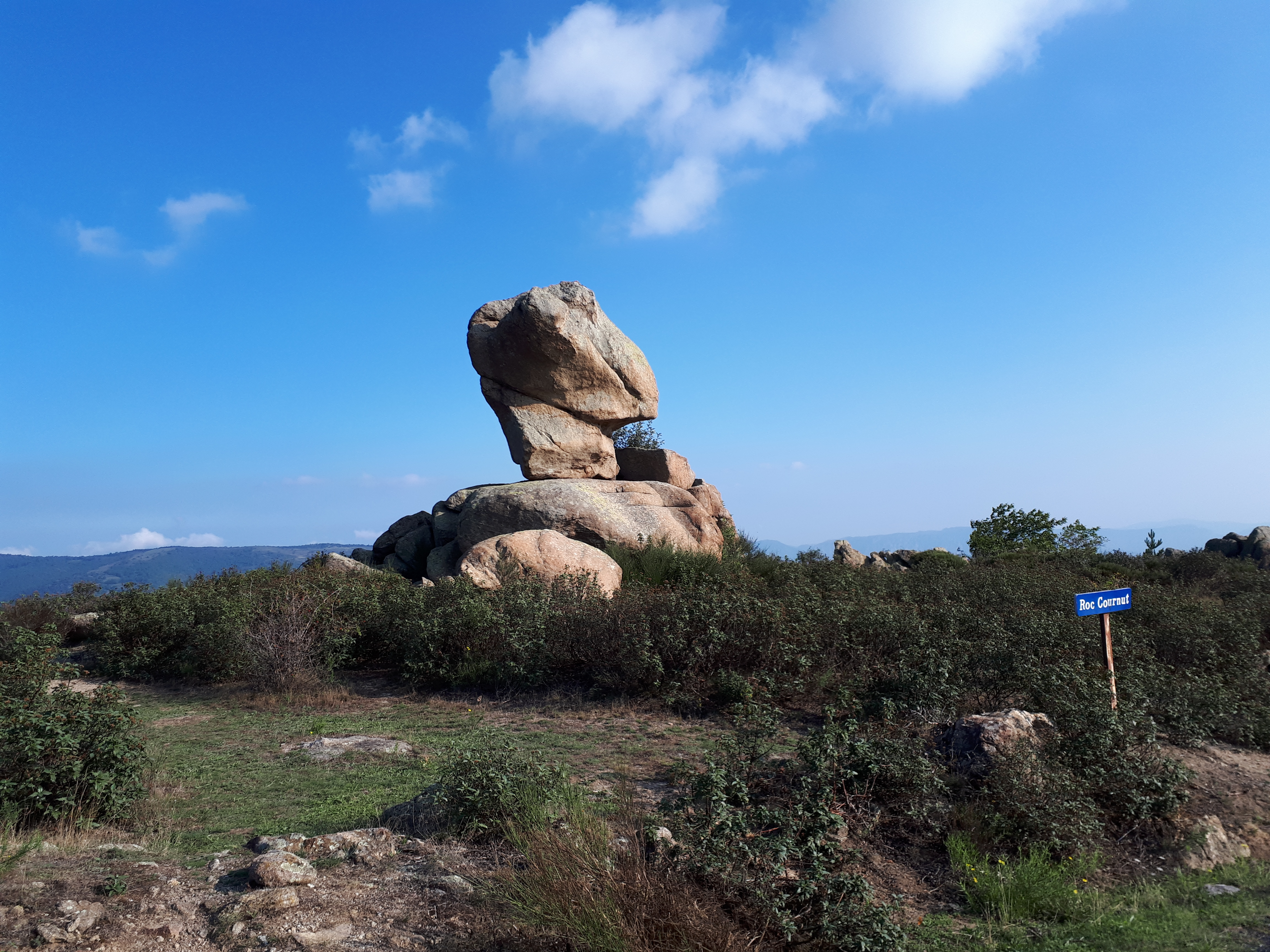
Roc Cornut, a celebrated granite tor, next to the D619 road in the commune of Campoussy, Pyrénées-Orientales, France.

Where joints happen to be unusually widely spaced, core blocks can survive and remain above the weathering surface, developing into tors. These can be monolithic, as at Haytor and Blackingstone Rock, but are more usually subdivided into stacks, often arranged in avenues. Each stack may include several tiers or pillows, which may become separated: rocking pillows are called logan stones. These stacks are vulnerable to frost action and often collapse, leaving trails of blocks down the slopes called clitter or clatter. Weathering has also given rise to circular ‘rock basins’ formed by the accumulation of water and repeated freezing and thawing. An example is found at Kes Tor on Dartmoor.

Dating of 28 tors on Dartmoor showed that most are surprisingly young, less than 100,000 years of surface exposure, with none more than 200,000 years old. They probably emerged at the start of the last major ice age (Devensian). By contrast in the Scottish Cairngorms, which is the other classic granite tor concentration in Britain, the oldest tors dated are between 200 and 675 thousand years of exposure, with even glacially modified tors having dates of 100–150,000 years.

== See also ==
- Bornhardt – Large, dome-shaped, steep-sided, bald rock
- Etchplain – Plain where the bedrock has been subject to considerable subsurface weathering
- Inselberg – Isolated, steep rock hill on relatively flat terrain
- Nubbin (landform) – Small hill of bedrock with rounded residual blocks
- List of geographical tors
