= Hensbarrow Beacon =

Hill in Cornwall, England

Highest point
- Elevation: 312 m (1,024 ft)
- Coordinates: 50.383136°N 4.812757°W

Naming
- Native name: Bre Krugewik (Cornish)
- English translation: Hind barrow hill

Geography
- Location within Cornwall
- Location: Cornwall, UK
- OS grid: SW 9967 5758

Hensbarrow Beacon (Cornish: Bre Krugewik, meaning hind barrow hill) is a hill in Cornwall, England, United Kingdom. It is situated a mile north-west of Stenalees village at grid reference SW 9967 5758. It is the highest natural point of the Hensbarrow uplands, a natural region and national character area.

The natural summit of Hensbarrow Beacon is 312m high and is marked by a trig point. The trig point sits atop a 5.4m tall round cairn that was later used as a beacon, it is a scheduled monument. It can be reached by a short walk from the road to the west. However, the summit is overtopped by several large spoil heaps from the nearby china clay workings, the highest of which rises to 355 m, therefore creating an 'artificial' summit 43 metres higher than the natural one.

As the highest point of Hensbarrow, the large degree of separation between Hensbarrow and Bodmin Moor to the north-east gives Hensbarrow Beacon enough relative height to make it a natural Marilyn, although the official Marilyn has been moved to the top of the highest spoil tip.

The medieval Blackmoor Stannary was centred at Hensbarrow Beacon, with its records stored at the church in Luxulyan.

== Geodesy ==
Hensbarrow Beacon was the origin (meridian) of the 6 inch and 1:2500 Ordnance Survey maps of Cornwall.

== Gallery ==
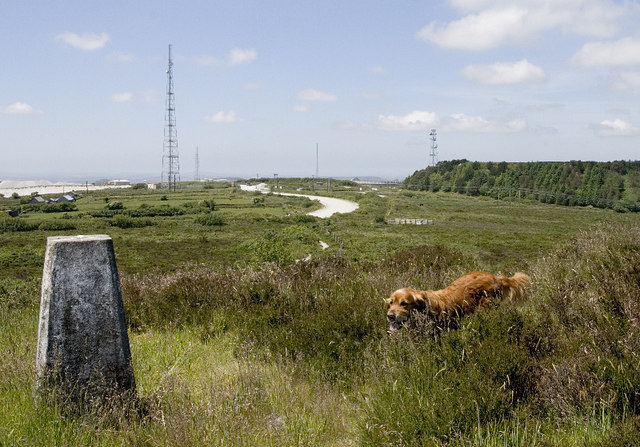

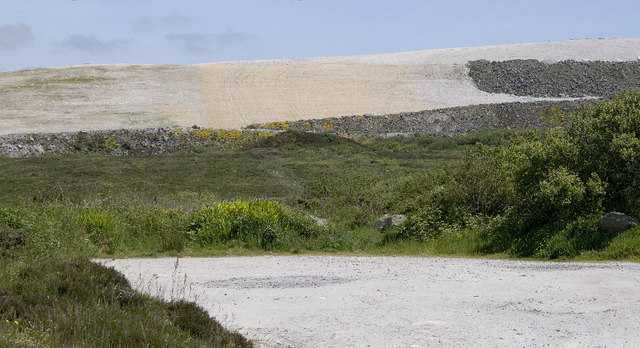
