= East Dartmoor =

Protected area in Devon, England

Coordinates: 50.613892°N 3.8571903°W

East Dartmoor is a Site of Special Scientific Interest (SSSI) within Dartmoor National Park in Devon, England. It is located north east of the hamlet of Postbridge and this protected area includes Birch Tor, Hookney Tor and Hameldown Tor. Rivers that have their source within East Dartmoor SSSI include the West Webburn River and the East Webburn River. This area is protected because of its heather moorland, and also because of the geology of Birch Tor.

== Biology ==
Plants in the moorland include heather, bell heather, cross leaved heath, bilberry and western gorse. Grass species include bristle bent. In the valleys there are peatland habitats. In these peatlands, moss species include Sphagnum papillosum, Sphagnum auriculatum, Sphagnum capillifolium, Sphagnum recurvum, Sphagnum palustre, Sphagnum squarrosum and Polytrichum commune. In bog pools, moss species include Sphagnum cuspidatum and plant species include bogbean, marsh lousewort, bog asphodel and black bog-rush.

Insect species include the emperor moth whose larval food plants include heather.

Moorland birds in this protected area include red grouse, snipe, curlew, wheatear, whinchat and ring ouzel.

== Geology ==
Birch Tor is a site of national geological importance. The biotite granite rocks are of Permo-Carboniferous age and contain xenoliths.

== Archaeology ==
East Dartmoor SSSI includes the site of a Bronze Age settlement known as Grimspound.

== Land ownership ==
Most of the land within East Dartmoor SSSI is owned by the Duchy of Cornwall. The area south of the East Webburn River is owned by the Natsworthy Estate.
