= Holne Woodlands =

Protected area in Devon, England

Coordinates: 50°31′33″N 3°50′08″W

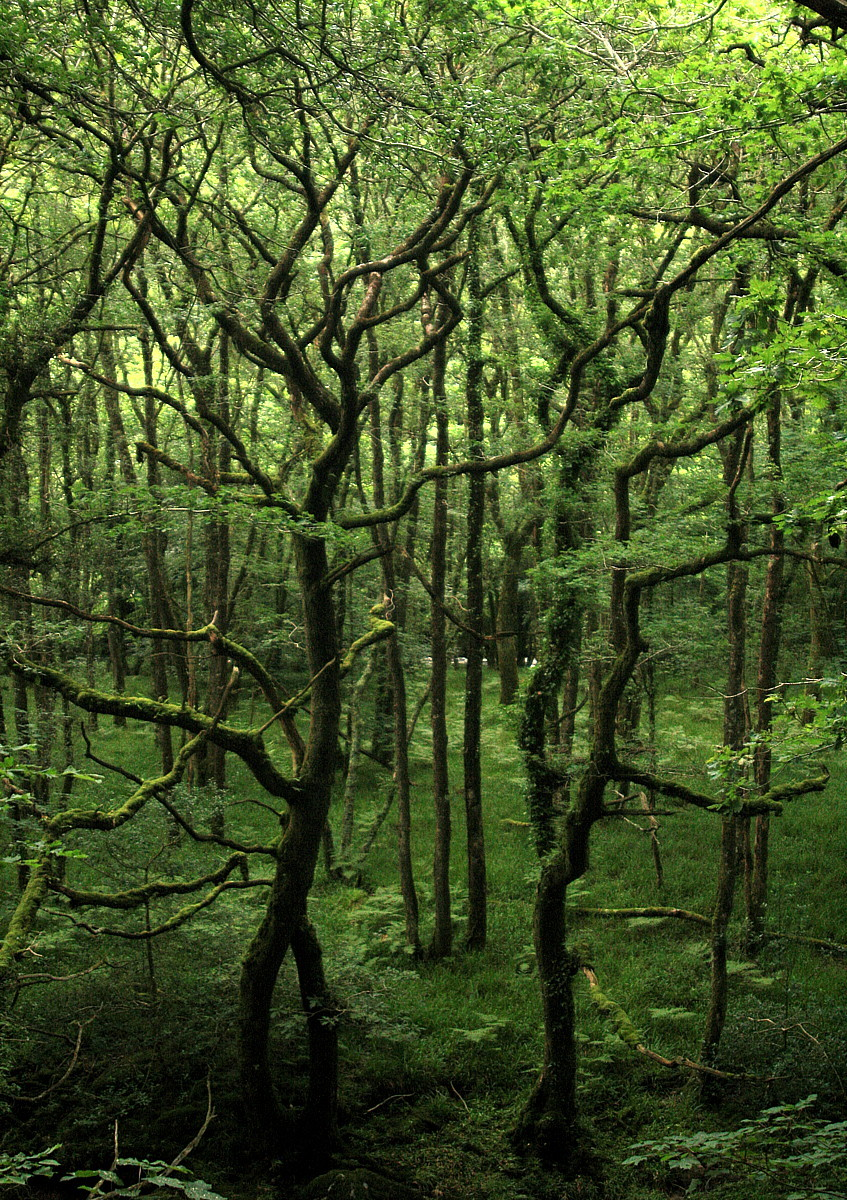
Holne Wood

Holne Woodlands is a Site of Special Scientific Interest (SSSI) within Dartmoor National Park in Devon, England. It is located between Dartmeet and Ashburton and encompasses part of the valley of the River Dart and part of the valley of the River Webburn. This protected area includes several Dartmoor Tors including Combestone Tor, Sharp Tor, Mel Tor, Hockinston Tor, Aish Tor and Blackadon Tor. This protected area has previously had the name of Holne Chase and Central South Dartmoor. This area is protected for its woodland lichen and bird communities. Otters have been observed in this protected area.

This protected area includes the Iron Age fort called Holne Chase Castle.

== Biology ==
Woodland here is dominated by sessile oak, with ash and wych elm trees occurring on wetter soils. On free draining soils, small-leaved lime trees are found. Herbaceous plants include sanicle, woodruff, primrose and common cow-wheat. Fern species (particularly on north-facing slopes) include scaly male-fern, broad buckler-fern, lady fern, lemon-scented fern (Thelypteris limbosperma), royal fern and Tunbridge filmy-fern.

Lichens in Holne Woodlands include Lobaria pulmonaria, Lobaria laetevirens, Lobaria scrobiculata, Graphina ruiziana, Heterodermia obscurata, Parmeliella jamesii, Peltigera collina, Parmelia sinuosa and Sticta dufourii.

Woodland bird species in Holne Woodlands include raven, buzzard, great spotted woodpecker, wood warbler, pied flycatcher, redstart, stonechat and whinchat. Fish in the rivers include salmon and trout.

== Geology ==
Much of this protected area lies on Carboniferous slates and mudstones.

== Land ownership and management ==
Part of this protected area, in the valley of the River Dart, near the village of Holne, is owned by the National Trust, which refers to it as Hembury and Holne Woods. Another part of Holne Woodlands SSSI is Blackadon Nature Reserve, in the valley of the River Webburn, which is managed by Devon Wildlife Trust.
