= Combestone Tor =

Granite tor on Dartmoor in Devon, England

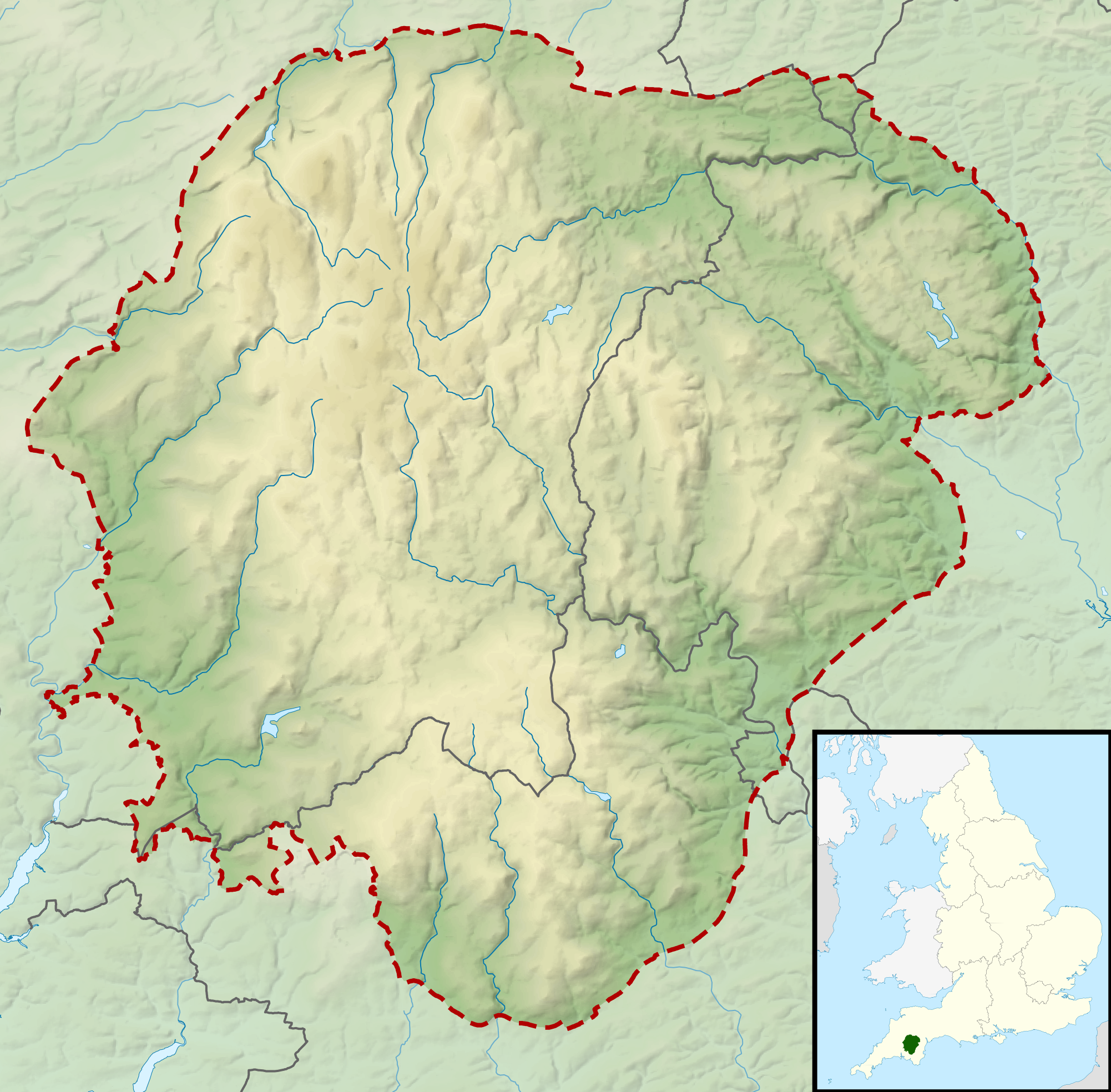
- Location within Dartmoor

Highest point
- Elevation: 356 m (1,168 ft)
- Coordinates: 50°31′53″N 3°52′39″W

Geography
- Location: Dartmoor, England
- OS grid: SX670718
- Topo map: OS Explorer OL28: Dartmoor

Climbing
- Easiest route: From its car park

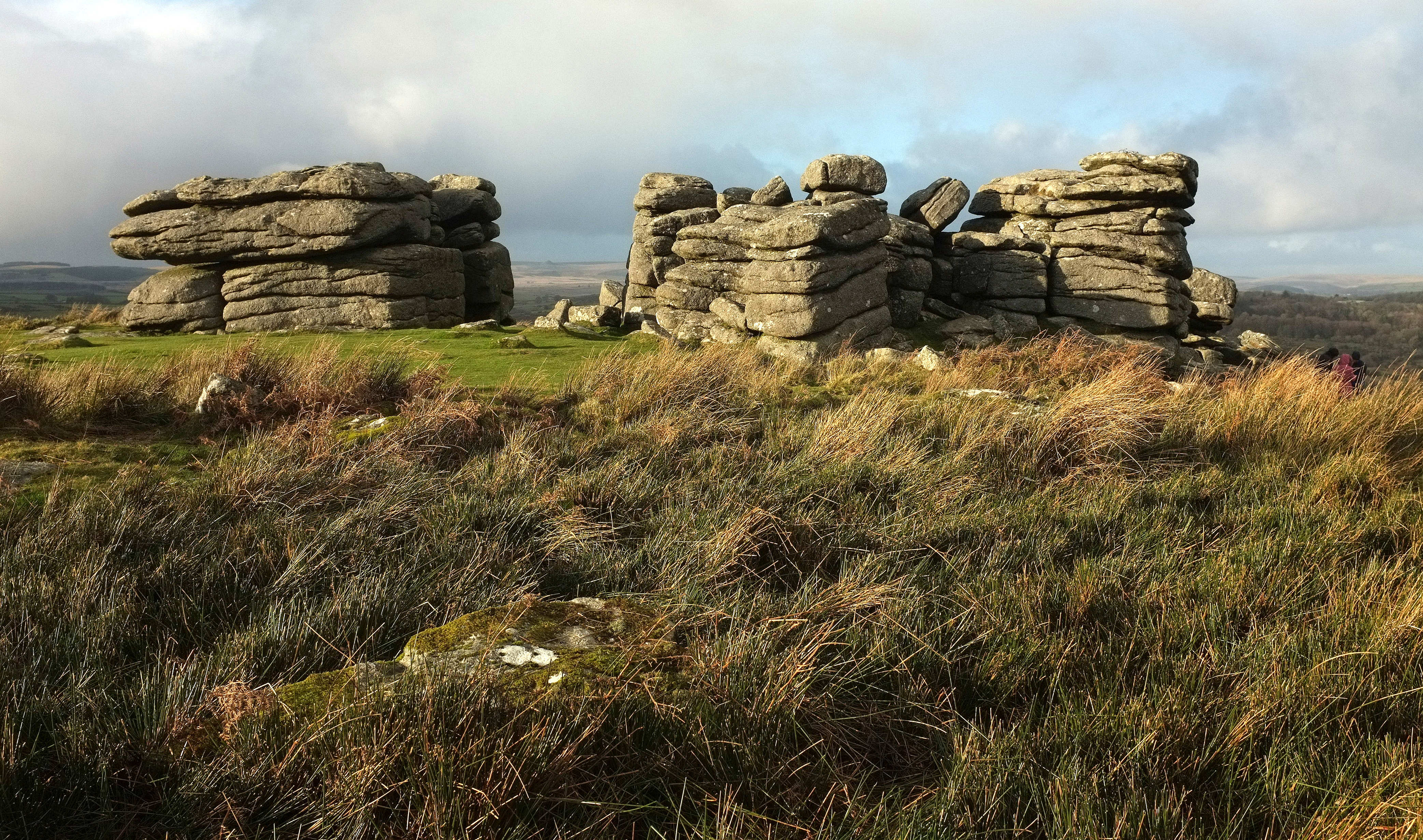
Combestone Tor

Combestone Tor is a granite tor on Dartmoor, England, sitting at 356 metres (1,168 ft) above sea level. The tor is considered a popular destination for tourists.

Combestone Tor is located within Dartmoor National Park and lies within the protected area of the Holne Woodlands Site of Special Scientific Interest.
