= Pot boiler =

Heated stone used to heat water

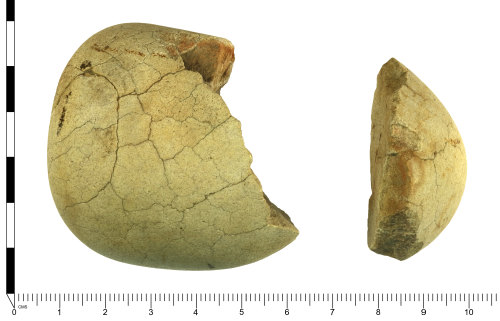
Two incomplete fire-cracked cobbles of unknown date which have been subjected to high heat causing them to crack and break. Date from: Circa 800 BC Date to: Circa AD 1800 (Iron Age to Medieval). Found by fieldwalking on cultivated land near Goole in Yorkshire, England.

In archaeology or anthropology, a pot boiler or cooking stone is a heated stone used to heat water, typically by people who did not have access to pottery or metal vessels.

== In Archaeology ==
The term refers to a stone used to move heat from a fire to a vessel to raise the temperature of water in the vessel, including for cooking. The stone is heated in a fire or in embers. When hot enough, the stone is transferred into a vessel of water to heat or boil the contents. The vessel may be metal (though this is uncommon, metal normally being tough enough to take direct heat from a fire) or pottery which is not of good enough quality to be directly exposed to the heat of the fire - or a wooden trough. In a pre-pottery context, the heating can be done by lining a pit with leather, leaves or clay, and then putting in the water followed by pot boilers directly into the vessel.

Such stones can be recognized because the repeated exposure to the heat of the fire followed typically by rapid chilling in water leads to great thermal stress on the stone's fabric due to the thermal expansion and contraction. This typically leads to partial glazing of the stone's surface and a fine network of cracks on the stone's surface (often described as "crazing"). Eventually the stone shatters. Individual fragments may be re-used until it becomes infeasible to manipulate the stone into and out of the fire, at which point the fragments are discarded and a new pot boiler (or many new ones) are acquired. Often the broken pot boilers are discarded into middens or domestic waste deposits, which on long-established sites can amount to many tonnes of material.

Reuse as building material is not impossible, but the typical small size of the fragments hinders this use.

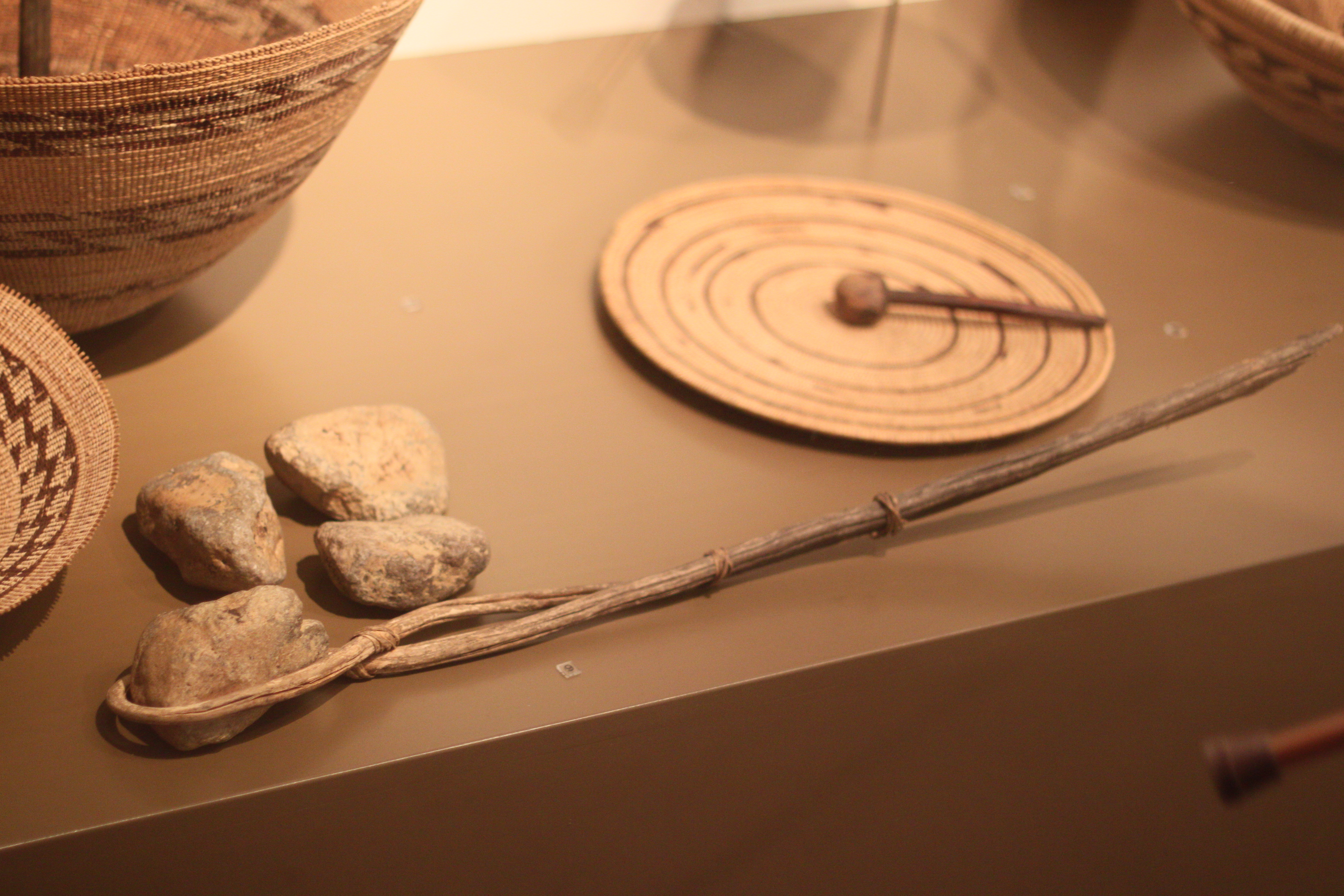
Ethnological Museum, Berlin-Dahlem; A Wooden fork and four steatite cooking stones. In most areas of California, native American cooking was done in watertight baskets. First, the acorn meal was mixed with water. By adding red-hot stones, the acorn mush was heated. After cooling, the stones were taken out with a wooden fork and replaced by new ones until the mush or soup was fully cooked.

=== Identification of artifactual boilers ===
Surface "crazing" is not restricted to pot boilers; hearth stones and the surrounds of fireplaces may also have it. However, since a pot boiler must be manipulated into and out of the fire (typically, in anthropological observations, with sticks of green wood) at arm's length, it starts off weighing up to several kilogrammes and shrinks by fragmentation; hearth stones and chimney liners are usually larger.

== See also ==
- Boiler
- Stone boiling
- Fulacht fiadh
