= Aish Tor =

Tor on Dartmoor in Devon, England

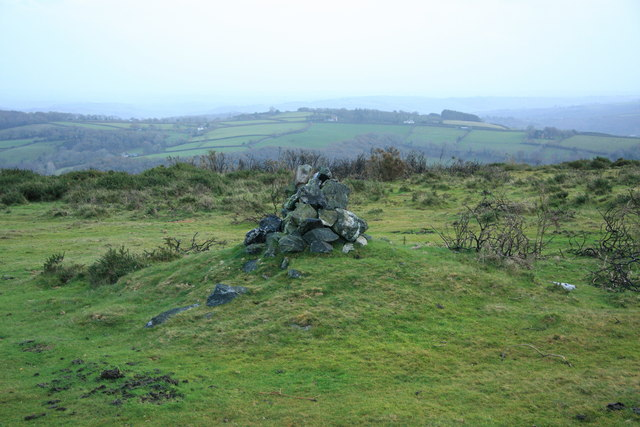
- Summit of Aish Tor

Highest point
- Elevation: 283 m (928 ft)
- Coordinates: 50°31′44″N 3°49′55″W

Geography
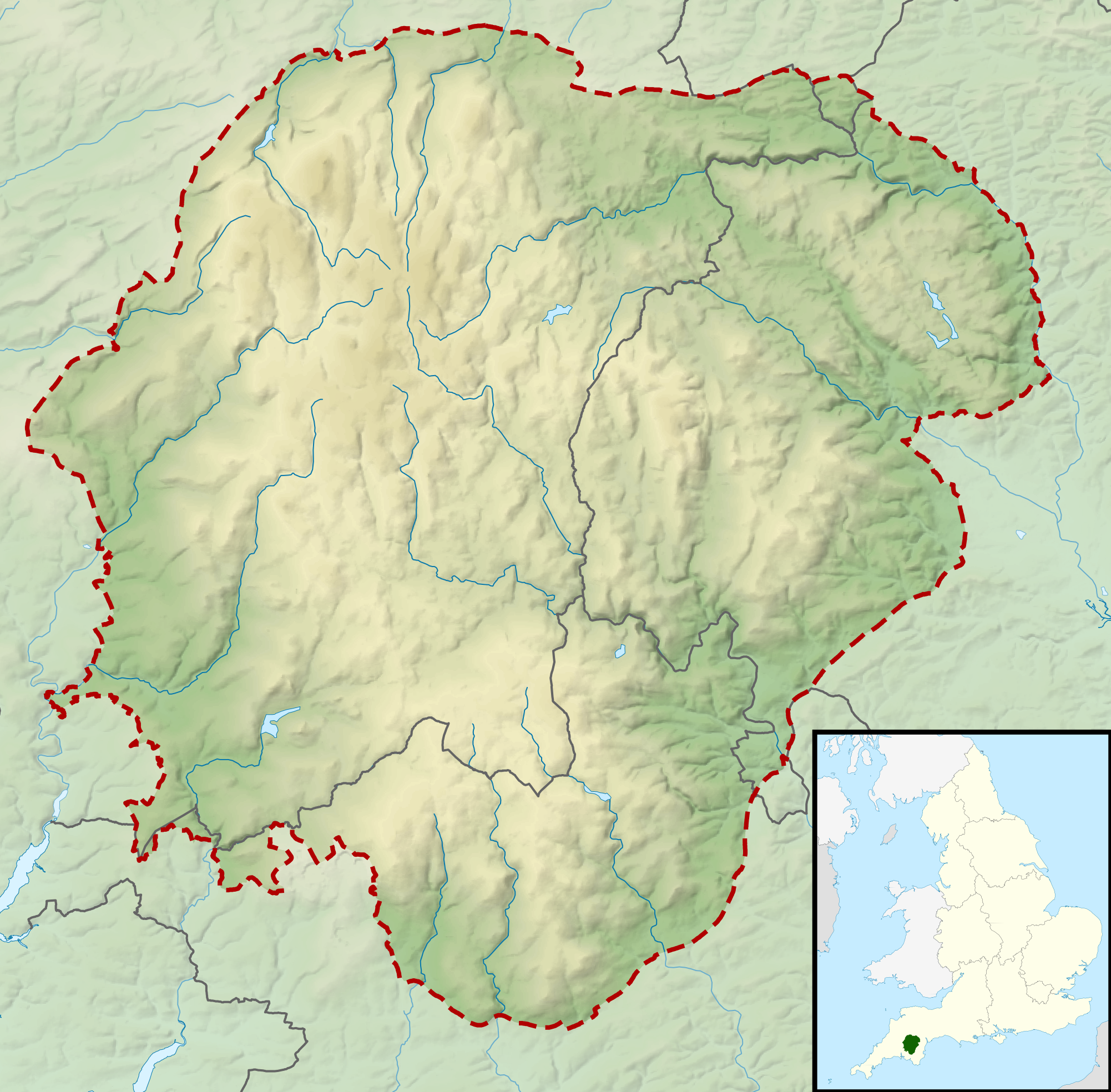
- Location within Dartmoor
- Location: Dartmoor, England
- OS grid: SX 7025 7151
- Topo map: OS Explorer OL28: Dartmoor

Climbing
- Easiest route: From Newbridge Hill

Aish Tor is a small tor above the northern side of the Dart Gorge in Dartmoor, Devon, England, that is accessed by Dr. Blackall's Drive from Newbridge Hill. It stands at 283 metres (928 ft) above sea level and is topped by a small cairn. The actual 'tor' is small and flat and generally hard to pin-point. Nearby tors include:

- Sharp Tor
- Leigh Tor
- Mel Tor
- Luckey Tor
- Bel Tor

Aish Tor is within the protected area called Holne Woodlands Site of Special Scientific Interest and also within Dartmoor National Park.
