= West Webburn River =

Stream on Dartmoor in Devon, England

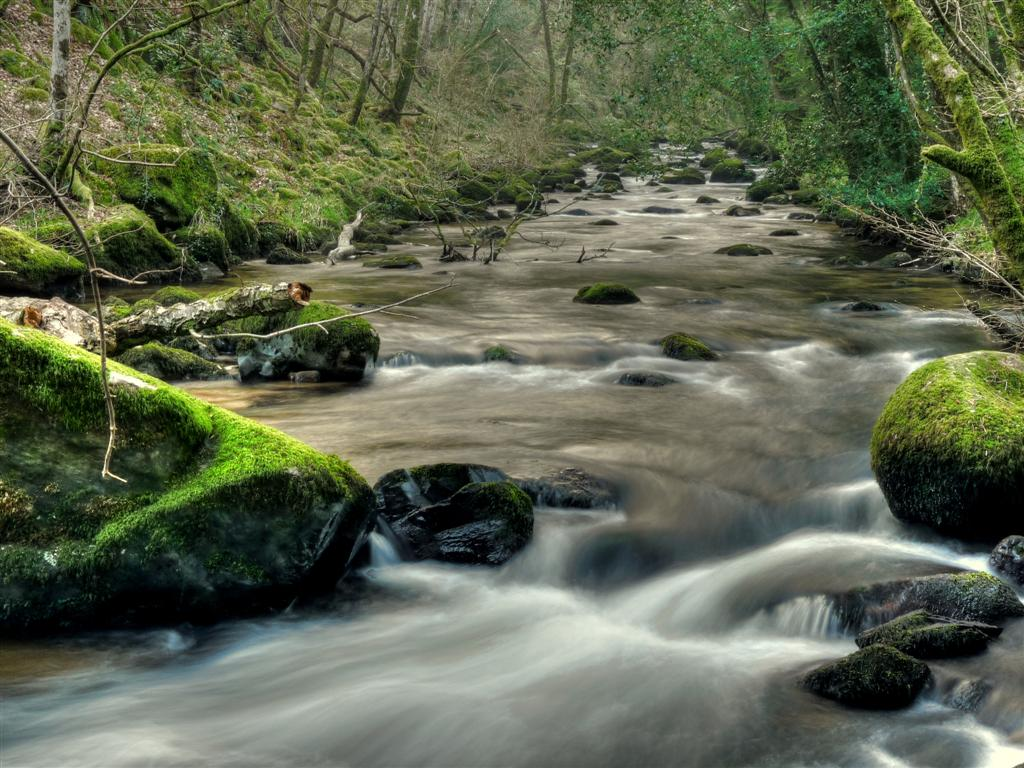
- Webburn River

- Location within Devon Location within the United Kingdom

Location
- Country: England
- County: Devon

Physical characteristics
- Source
  - location: Eastern Dartmoor
- Mouth: East Webburn River
  - location: Oakmoor Wood
  - coordinates: 50.542°N 3.814°W

The West Webburn is a stream on Dartmoor in Devon in south-west England. It rises on the eastern side of the moors flowing off the east side of Hameldown Ridge. Its source is extremely close to the Grimspound Bronze Age settlement, and it was probably the main source of water for the settlement. It flows south, going past Widecombe-in-the-Moor, and joins the East Webburn River at Lizwell Meet in Oakmoor Wood. These combined streams then join the River Dart at Buckland Bridge close to the village of Holne.
