= East Webburn River =

Stream on Dartmoor in Devon, England

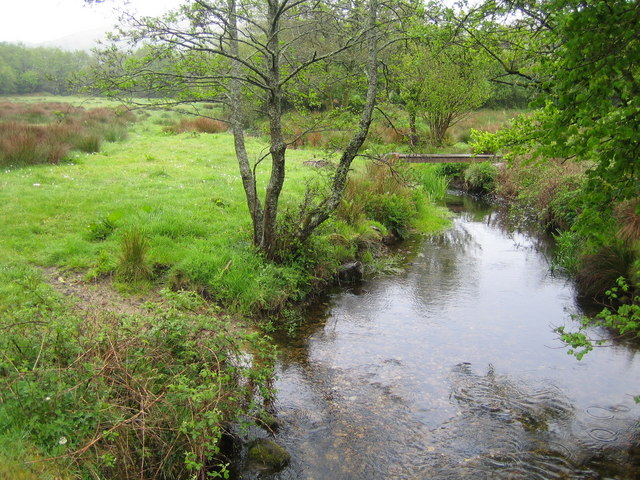
- The East Webburn River passing close to Widecombe

- Location within Devon Location within the United Kingdom

Location
- Country: England
- County: Devon

Physical characteristics
- Source: Dartmoor moors
- Mouth: Lizwell Meet
  - location: Oakmoor Wood
  - coordinates: 50°32′56″N 3°49′03″W
- Length: 5 miles (8 km)

The East Webburn is a 5-mile (8 km) stream in the Dartmoor moors in Devon in south-west England. It rises on the western side of the moors, flowing off the west side of Hameldown ridge. Its source is around 1/2 mile (0.80 km) southwest of Grimspound Bronze Age settlement. It flows south past Widecombe-in-the-Moor and joins the West Webburn River at Lizwell Meet in Oakmoor Wood. These combined streams then join the River Dart close to the village of Holne.
