= Stone boiling =

Method of food preparation

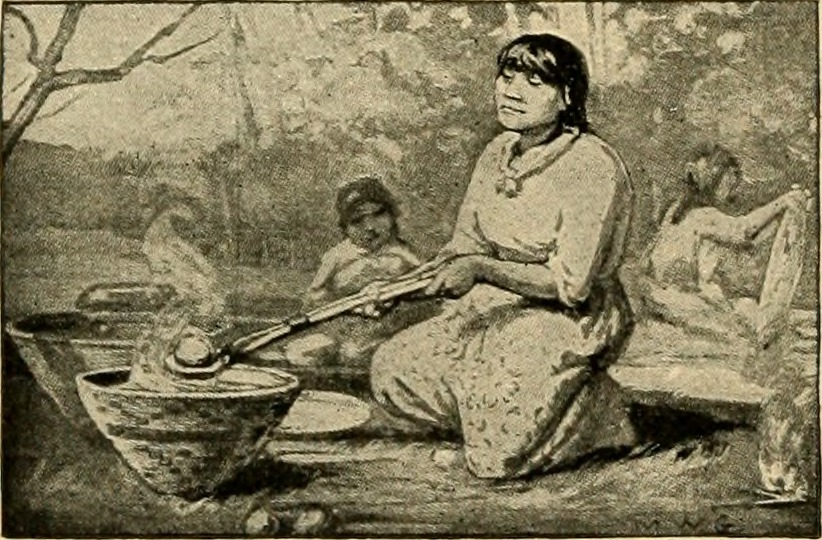
Stone boiling, a Native method of making infusions and soups

Stone boiling is a moist-heat cooking method. It involves placing heated rocks into a water-filled container to heat the liquid to the point where it can be used to cook. This method of food preparation is a fuel-intensive process and it often requires the heating and reheating of stones before the water reaches an effective cooking temperature.

Indigenous peoples in what is now Canada and the United States of America, especially on the West and Northwest Coast, used stone boiling. Cooking this way allowed for a more controlled temperature which made the extraction of fats and oils easier while also allowing for more nutrients to be obtained from such oils. Indigenous peoples’ first use of stone boiling, based on archaeological excavations in the Northern Plains, was dated at 4800 years ago. However, its use became more prominent between 250 C.E. and 1750 C.E.; Brian Reeves, professor of anthropology and archaeology at the University of Calgary, argued this is because of the need to feed increasing populations.

This method was also common among Polynesians in precolonial times including Hawaiians (particularly for processing natural dyes), Samoans, Tahitians, and the Māori.

Modern indigenous food sovereignty movements are reintroducing this traditional method of cooking.

== Materials ==
=== Above-ground containers ===
Above-ground cooking vessels used in stone boiling consisted of: bark baskets and bark containers; pottery; as well as suspended animal paunches and hides. There are even instances of small canoes being utilized as cooking containers on the Northwest Coast for the preparation of whale fat.

Indigenous peoples’ usage of a given above-ground container type depended on the resources available to them. For example, First Nations on the Northwest Coast and eastern Canada are reported by Harold E. Driver, former professor of anthropology at Indiana University, and William Clifford Massey, former professor of anthropology at the University of Washington, to have used bark baskets and bark containers for stone boiling. However, bark baskets were preferred to bark containers because they did not burn as easily, which made them more durable. In eastern Canada among some Haudenosaunee peoples, large clay pots with thick walls were likely used for stone boiling. While such walls allowed for better insulation, Gregory Braun, professor of anthropology at the University of Toronto, attributed their thickness to the need to support the container’s structure without breaking, given the weight of the rocks inside. Plains peoples used suspended animal paunches in addition to below-ground boiling pits.

Polynesians have various open containers for this purpose like the kumete, ʻumete or ʻumeke, made of wood or calabash; the Māori of New Zealand have scaled-up wooden troughs known as kōhua, the name has since lent to introduced metal pots and pans.

=== Below-ground containers ===
Plains peoples are reported by Jack W. Brink, curator of archaeology with the Royal Alberta Museum, and Bob Dawe, assistant curator of archaeology with the Royal Alberta Museum, to have used below-ground boiling pits because the wind cooled above-ground containers before the rocks could efficiently heat the water which made the already fuel-intensive process less effective and viable. At Head-Smashed-In Buffalo Jump in what is now Alberta, Canada, bison hides were used to line pits that held the water.

=== Stones ===
Indigenous peoples’ use of stone boiling involved heating stones in or near a hearth or fire before the rocks were transferred to a nearby water-filled container by using forked sticks. The rocks would then be removed from the container by using those forked sticks and bracing the stones to the side of the container.

Rocks used in stone boiling were often fist-sized. This is because the heat that smaller stones were capable of transferring was not worth the resources required to reach such a temperature. As such, once a stone became smaller than 10 cm in any dimension, it was discarded.

The reason stones would break is because of their repeated reheating, a process that could heat the rocks upwards of 500 °C. At Head-Smashed-In Buffalo Jump, no complete boiling stones were found after eight seasons of excavation, which according to Jack W. Brink and Bob Dawe attests to the rocks being reused. The rocks in question are hypothesized by Brink and Mr. Dawe to have been imported from a nearby river, and were more predominant in stone boiling than the available sandstone because the river rocks would heat up more slowly and transfer their heat more slowly making it a better material for cooking.

== Usage ==
=== Purposes ===
Indigenous peoples used stone boiling to produce nut oil, bone grease, and cook vegetable and meat stews. While the process is fuel-intensive, stone boiling, according to Gerald Anthony Oetelaar, professor of anthropology and archaeology at the University of Calgary, and Alwynne B. Beaudoin, head curator at the Royal Alberta Museum, helped to alleviate the pressures of increasing populations as more nutrients could be extracted from existing food sources. Bone grease, in particular, served an economic purpose on the plains as it is used in the production of pemmican. Pemmican was an important trade item and storable food source.

=== Places ===
Stone boiling was used across North America, especially among West and Northwest Coast peoples. Indigenous peoples living between 33- and 58-degrees latitude, and 100- and 130-degrees longitude are generally associated with the use of stone boiling based on Kit Nelson’s, professor of anthropology at Tulane University, model of 152 “cultural groups” drawn from three sources: the Database of North American Indians, Binford’s Hunter–Gatherer Database, and the eHRAF files.

Access to the requisite fuels to heat stones is likely associated with stone boiling's use. For example, the Deg Hit'an and the Aleut used this cooking technique despite being above the 58-degrees latitude generalized threshold, which Harold E. Driver and William C. Massey attribute to their access to wood.

== See also ==
- Khorkhog, a Mongolian dish cooked by placing hot stones into a container with meat.
- Stone Soup
