= Grimspound =

Bronze Age settlement on Dartmoor, England

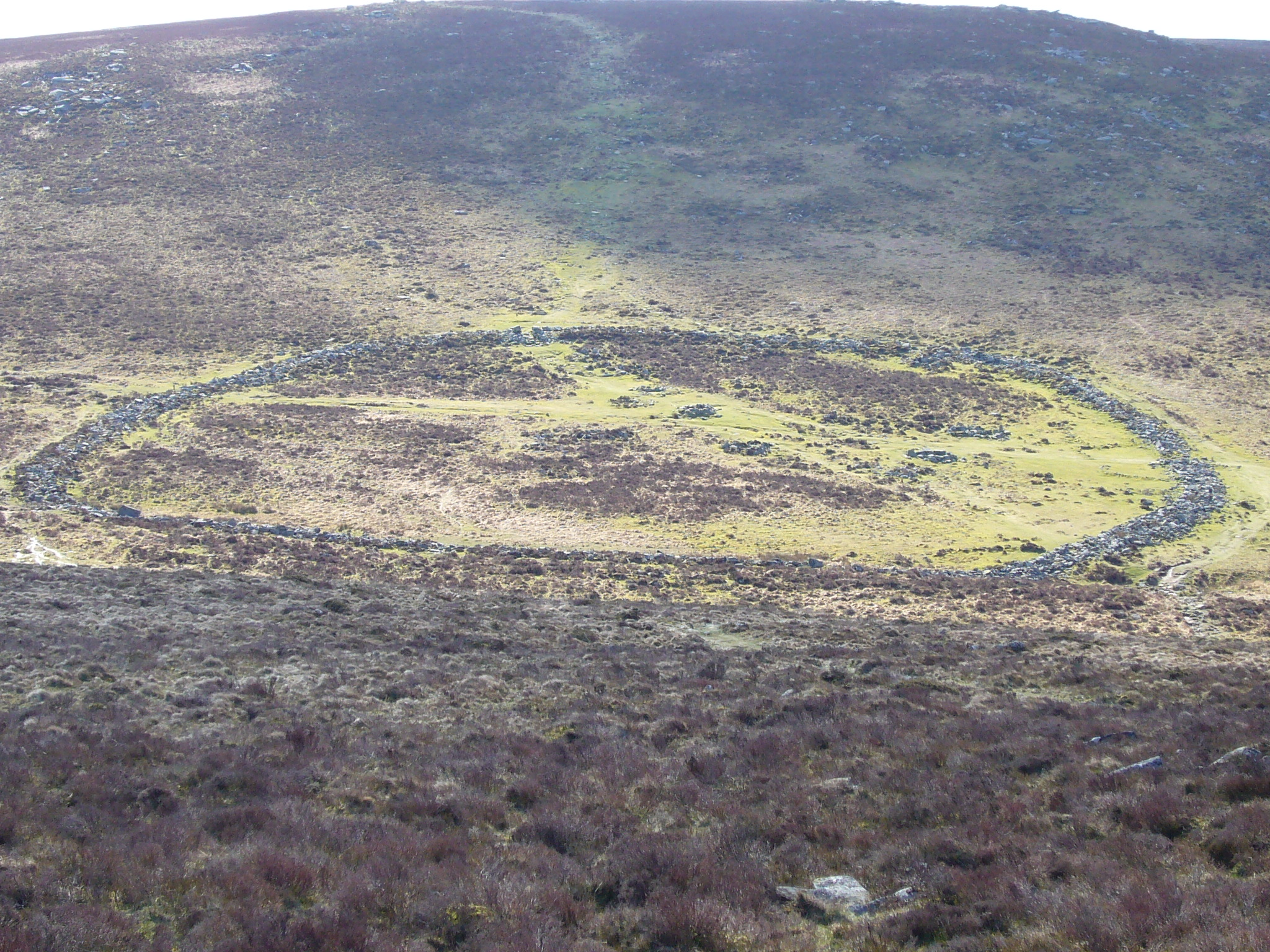
- View of Grimspound from Hookney Tor

- Location within Devon
- 50.6133°N 3.837°W
- Type: Settlement
- Periods: Bronze Age
- Location: Dartmoor
- Region: England

Site notes
- Owner: English Heritage
- Public access: Yes

Scheduled monument
- Official name: Grimspound, a partially enclosed prehistoric settlement with field system and two post-medieval caches between Hookney Tor and Hameldown Tor
- Designated: 26 November 1928
- Reference no.: 1014667

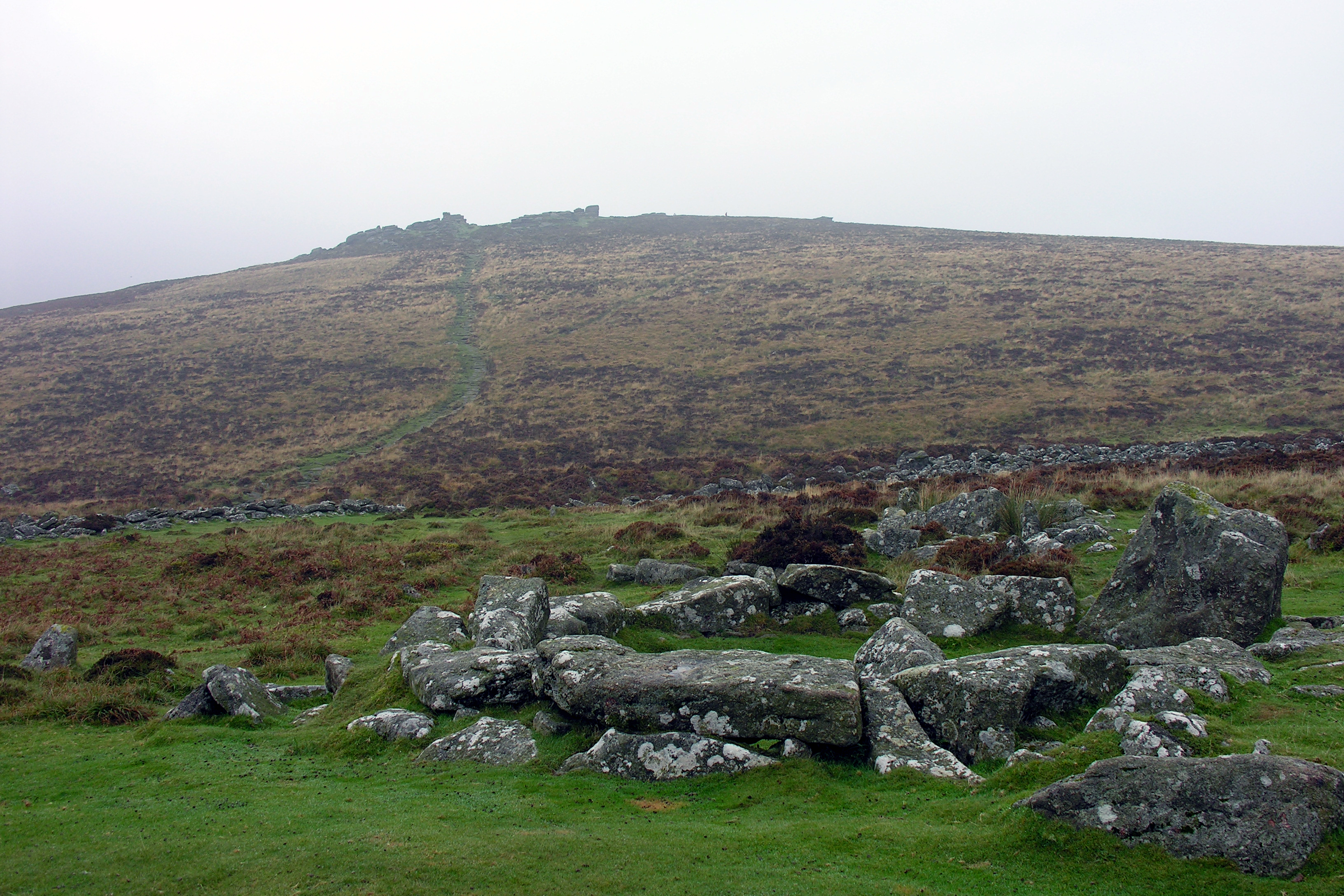

Bronze Age settlement, situated on Dartmoor in Devon, England. It consists of a set of 24 hut circles surrounded by a low stone wall. The name was first recorded by the Reverend Richard Polwhele in 1797; it was probably derived from the Anglo-Saxon god of war, Grim (more commonly known as Woden, or Odin).

In 1893 an archaeological dig was carried out by the Dartmoor Exploration Committee, which recorded many details of Grimspound as well as, controversially, making a reconstruction of the site.

The site was designate as a scheduled monument in 1928.

== History ==
The site was first settled in about 1300 BC. The 24 hut circles are surrounded by a massive granite perimeter wall, which may have stood at 1.7 metres in places. The roundhouses, with an average diameter of 3.4 metres, were each built of a double ring of granite slabs with a rubble infill, a technique still used in dry-stone walling. Hut 3 has a surviving porchway, with the two jamb stones still upright, although the lintel has fallen.

There is evidence of human activity: artefacts include pottery, scrapers and pot boilers. Organic remains such as wood and textiles have not survived owing to the acid nature of the soil.

=== Early descriptions ===
The name Grimspound was first recorded by the Reverend Polwhele in his "Historical Views of Devonshire" in 1793. He called it "The seat of judicature" for the River Dart area, and also surmised that it was "one of the principal temples of the Druids. Other ideas about Grimspound include supposed uses as an Iron Age fort, an encampment for tin miners and even a Phoenician settlement. His interpretation was as a judicial centre for a cantred of the Durius, but his comparison to the Stannary courts show he has explicitly used a modern interpretation and so may be far-fetched ideas Lysons was the first to measure the site, giving an estimate of the walls’ height and thickness as 12 feet (3.7 meters) and a measurement of the enclosed area, alongside a description of previous interpretations: a religious site, a ‘british town’ and connected to the Birch Tor mines. He notes two entrances, one to the south (presumably the present one) and one to the north, which despite him probably not ever seeing Grimspound, the estimated measurements are fairly accurate, falling within half an acre of the actual measurement - 1.45 hectares. Others queried its function, with Burt suggesting in 1826 that the site was a walled town and a place to keep cattle A contemporary writer named Bray supported the notion of it being a ‘town’ and referenced Strabo and Caesar's descriptions of early sites as comparisons to Grimspound Around the middle of the 19th century, opinions begin to change. The valley position is noted and its function interpreted as defending cattle against wolves with the hut circles for the owners and cattle herders Two men resisted this change of opinion and saw the site's use as protecting the common Dartmoor mineral of tin Interestingly, another author highlighted its location on a possible ancient route through the break in the ridge of Hameldown.

Grimspound was first mapped by A. C. Shillabear in 1829. When overlain on the 1990 map, the discrepancy between the two is very slight, a testament to Shillabeer's accuracy of locating features. This includes the pens, gateway, the central hut circles and even a large stone at the northern end of the site. However, the interesting points are the presence of several now-vanished features. In the western side of the enclosure, many features can be seen. To the north of the semi-circular enclosure, is a line of two parallel walls. When compared to the most recent survey, this has disappeared. The semi-circular enclosure has also vanished and, possibly due to the 1893 and 1894 excavations, many internal features of the hut circles are gone. An 1855 plan by Nick Whitely shows hut circles outlying the perimeter wall, unrecorded elsewhere.

During September 1904, Bertram Fletcher Robinson had a non-fictional article entitled The Fortress of the First Britons. A Description of the Fortress of Grimspound, on Dartmoor published in Pearson's Magazine (Vol. XVIII, pp. 273–280). This article is illustrated throughout with both drawings and photographs and it was republished during 2008 by Brian Pugh and Paul Spiring in their biography about Robinson, which is titled Bertram Fletcher Robinson: A Footnote to the Hound of the Baskervilles.

=== Excavation ===
In 1893 the Dartmoor Exploration Committee began a dig at the site. The dig, one of whose members was the Reverend Sabine Baring-Gould, reconstructed some of the site, a move criticised by some of the Committee at the time and also by later researchers, including R. Hansford Worth. The excavation commenced with the location of the entrance and then removing the topsoil and any loose stones, before a trench was cut through the hut circle, with straight-edged stones left in place. Once a hearth was discovered, the earth was sieved carefully for environmental finds such as charcoal, seeds and flint. Both halves of the hut circle were then cleared and the soil sieved. Once the entire hut circle had been cleared, the site was backfilled and the huts reconstructed. Whilst this was an antiquarian endeavour, several aspects of the excavation could be seen as highly progressive for the time. On many of their excavations, charcoal and bone samples were collected for museum deposition, which along with their sieving of soil indicates an early observance of the importance of environmental evidence, perhaps to date the site or examine in a laboratory for microscopic finds. However, some aspects of their methodology were flawed, such as assumptions in what they identified as a hut or cattle pen then determining what was and wasn't excavated, and to what extent it would be excavated - some huts like Hut II had only a single trench through it. The lack of a drawing and extra information in comparison to Hut I or Hut III is further evidence of their bias.

The 1894 report surmised it was a Neolithic enclosed site and the succeeding report determined its function as a cattle enclosure, with their main reason for reaching this conclusion was the three areas of higher ground surrounding the site, making it militarily indefensible. It could also be argued that they reached this conclusion due to a reliance on the time on the three-age system, which determined the dating of many sites based on the absence or presence of stone, bronze and/or iron objects - the language in the conclusion of the first report suggests that this may have been the case, too.

=== Post-excavation ===
Since 1894, very little has been done at Grimspound. Many early writers of the 20th century disagreed with the conclusions of the DEC, on both dating and function. The etymology was discussed in 1919 and Watkin concluded that it was of Saxon origin, due to a Saxon etymology of Grimspound meaning 'Witches Enclosure'. In 1927, Chanter firmly disagreed with the DEC, citing a lack of permanent occupation and therefore concluding that it was a defensive site to protect the tribe from cattle raiders. In 1964 Lady Aileen Fox, a prominent Dartmoor archaeologist during the later 20th century, helped restore the site primarily to help prevent erosion that had taken place since the excavations. Following a 60-year gap in Grimspound literature, Griffiths re-evaluated the date, placing it within the 2nd millennium BC, making it a Bronze Age site Alongside Griffith, Fleming contextualised the site by placing it within the Hameldown reave system, giving the site a 'territory' and then later interpreting it radically as a defensive camp for warrior bachelors.

Marking the 100th anniversary of the DEC's first excavations, the Devon Archaeological Society dedicated their 52nd volume to Grimspound, including articles evaluating the knowledge gained over the past 100 years, including two on Grimspound. Simon Timms critiqued the DEC excavations and identified a need to re-excavate the site and also drew particular attention to the 'massive' walls, both arguably important points that showed Grimspound may be more significant than had been identified before. Pattison and Fletcher also argued for a re-excavation of the site, and whilst they do not necessarily conclude a function or date, they do identify that it may have also had ceremonial or ritual protection for the inhabitants, rejecting the defensive theory due to the wall size being an illusion and not as substantial as they are thought to be - however, there is little evidence provided for this argument Jeremy Butler, a well known author on the archaeology of Dartmoor during the 1990s, provided a description of Grimspound that for the first time recognised possible re-occupation of the site after the Bronze Age. Although he notes there has been a lack of damage to the site between Shillabeer's survey and the book's writing, he also identifies a need for re-excavation of the site, particularly in the empty areas.

Post 1994, there is a lack of sources on the site although many references and brief descriptions are present in hiking guides and other generic Dartmoor enthusiasts’ books. However, these references contain contradictory statements on dating, function and generic mimicking of information from the DEC. Despite no absolute dating evidence, these range from generic ‘Bronze Age’, to ‘Middle Bronze Age', ‘Late Bronze Age’ and ‘Late Bronze Age or Early Iron Age’.

Many also disagree over the function, interpreting it as a ‘fortress’, ‘permanent settlement’, 'village', and ‘fortified village’

=== Geophysical survey ===
In 2019, Jowan Albon (as part of an undergraduate dissertation for the University of Leicester) and the Cambridge School of Mines embarked upon a geophysical survey of the site to identify new structures in the empty areas of the site and the extent of wall foundations.

The surveys took place during the Summer and Autumn of 2019, in two parts. The first was an electromagnetometry survey using a GSSI EMP-400 and Wenner Array resistivity using a Chauvin Arnoux soil resistivity tester, on a four-node Wenner Array setting. The second survey was a twin probe resistance survey using an RM85 resistance meter.

The results of the Electromagnetometry were largely inconclusive and showing water in the soil and the natural geology interfering with the results, but some grids also showed potential for possible rubbish pits, as well as a curious horizontal feature. The first resistance survey encountered technical difficulties and couldn't be accurately located, but did show up a new porched hut circle similar to hut III and also possible features associated with the walls. The second resistance survey was more conclusive, showing four new hut circles, possible stone alignments and curvilinear features that may be paddocks or to do with later re-use of the site. One curious feature in particular was a double circular feature, one half possibly stone-built with the other half being a possible ditched feature, with an unknown function.

== Location ==
Grimspound is located in the valley between Hameldown Tor and Hookney Tor, at 450 metres above sea level. The nearest village, Widecombe-in-the-Moor, is a few miles to the south.

== Description ==
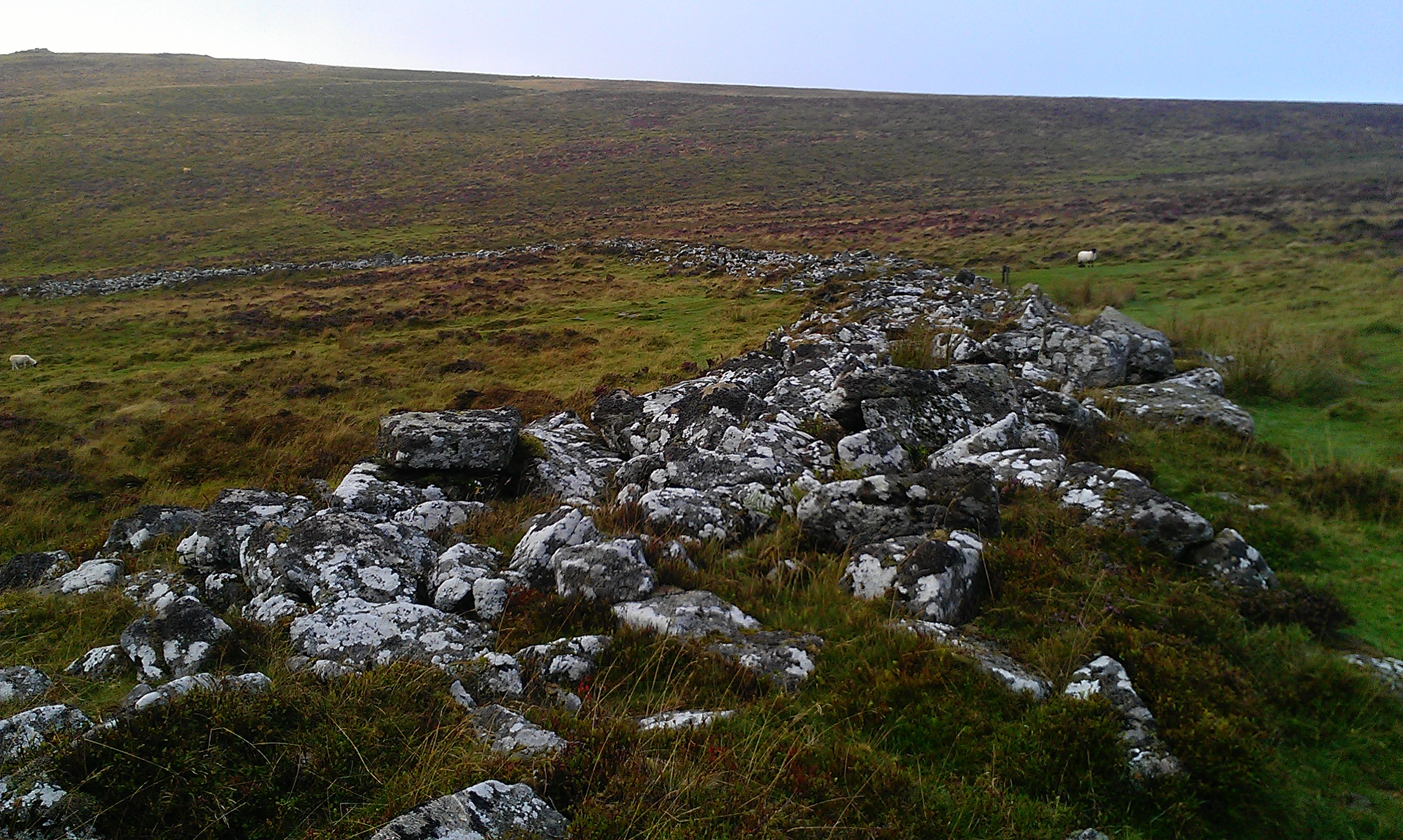
Eastern end of Grimspound

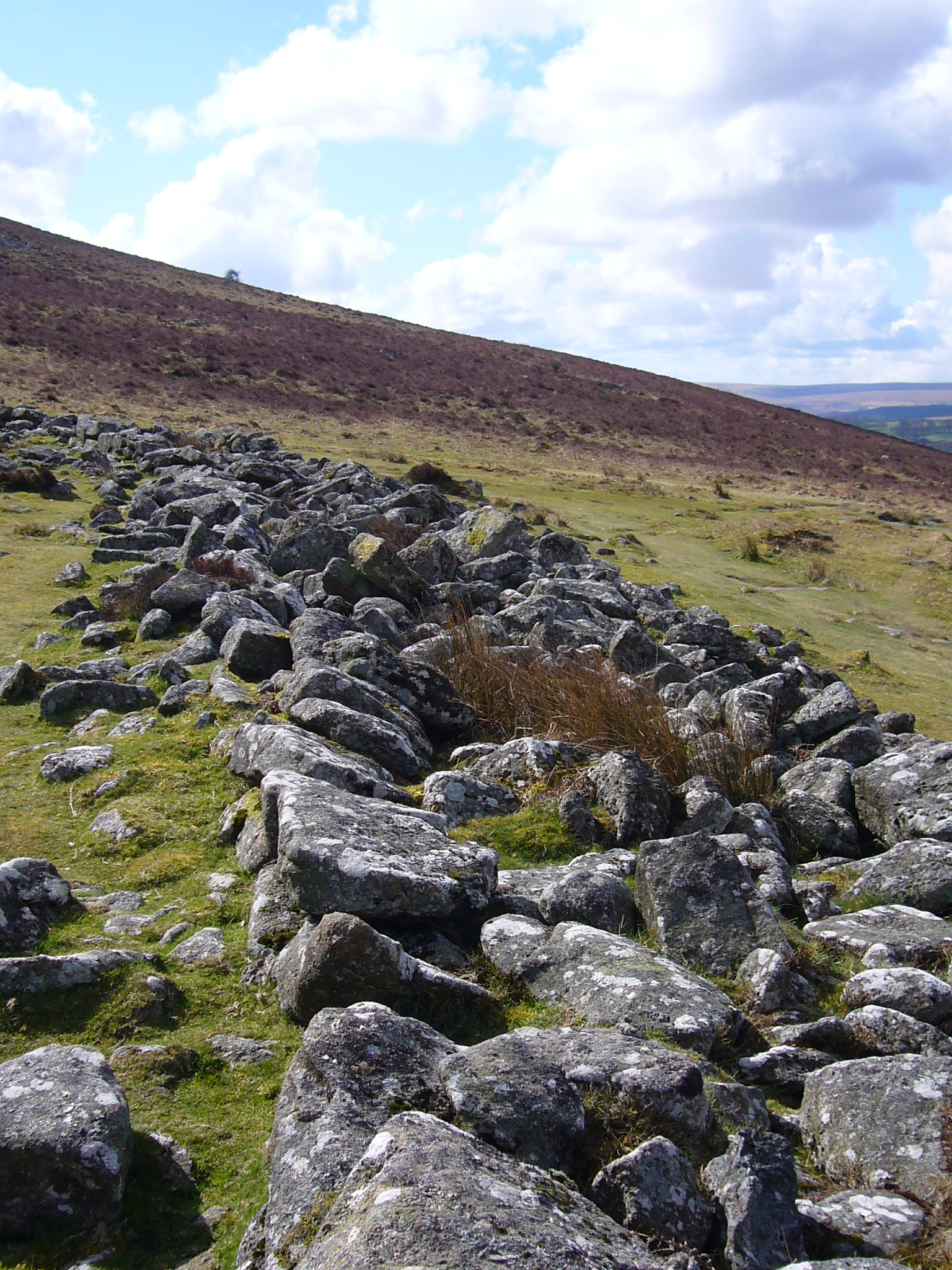
Grimspound's outer wall

The site is enclosed by a stone wall, interrupted by a large, paved entrance facing south, uphill towards Hameldown. The wall would have been substantial – in some places its ruins are more than 15 feet (4.6 m) in thickness. However, the site is of limited value from a defensive point of view, so the assumption is that the wall was to keep livestock in, and predators out. It is possible that it was topped by a hedge or fence. On the northern edge of the site is the start of the West Webburn, which was the main water source for the settlement. The walls are predominantly local granite rock as suggested by Sabine Baring-Gould in the initial Grimspound report and can be seen in how Hameldown Tor weathers, providing large thick boulders suitable for facing slabs. It is thought the walls were originally hollow, although recent authors suggest they were double walled with rubble infill which could potentially provide space for a wall-walk on top of it if it were topped with a palisade fence.

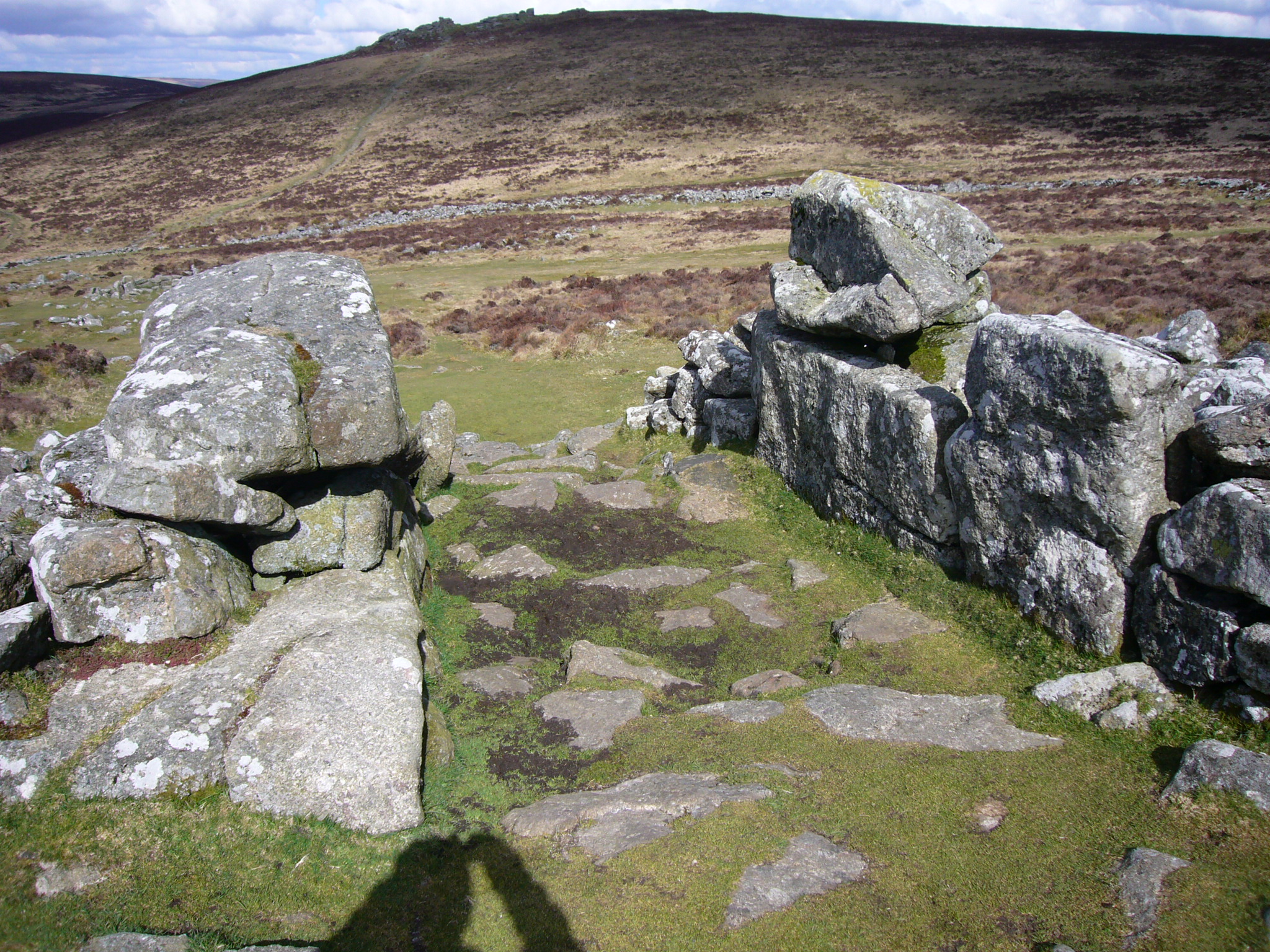
Grimspound's southern entrance

The entrance is described as "the most imposing of all" by Jeremy Butler. It is a paved and stepped corridor 5.5 metres long and almost 2 metres wide, with megaliths and other large stones forming the sides. Butler states that it was not designed to exclude livestock. However, there are parallel wall lines to the western side of the enclosure as indicated by Shillabeer in 1829, these may be a corridor-like entryway. It faces downslope suggesting a more defensible entrance. Many of the original stones may have been robbed from the current entry which could mean it was larger.

Excavations at other sites on Dartmoor have shown that such walls were probably built by small teams of men working simultaneously on a section each, as shown by differences in building style; some evidence of this is visible here. However, these may simply be due to the reconstruction work by the 1894 excavation (see below).

=== The hut circles ===
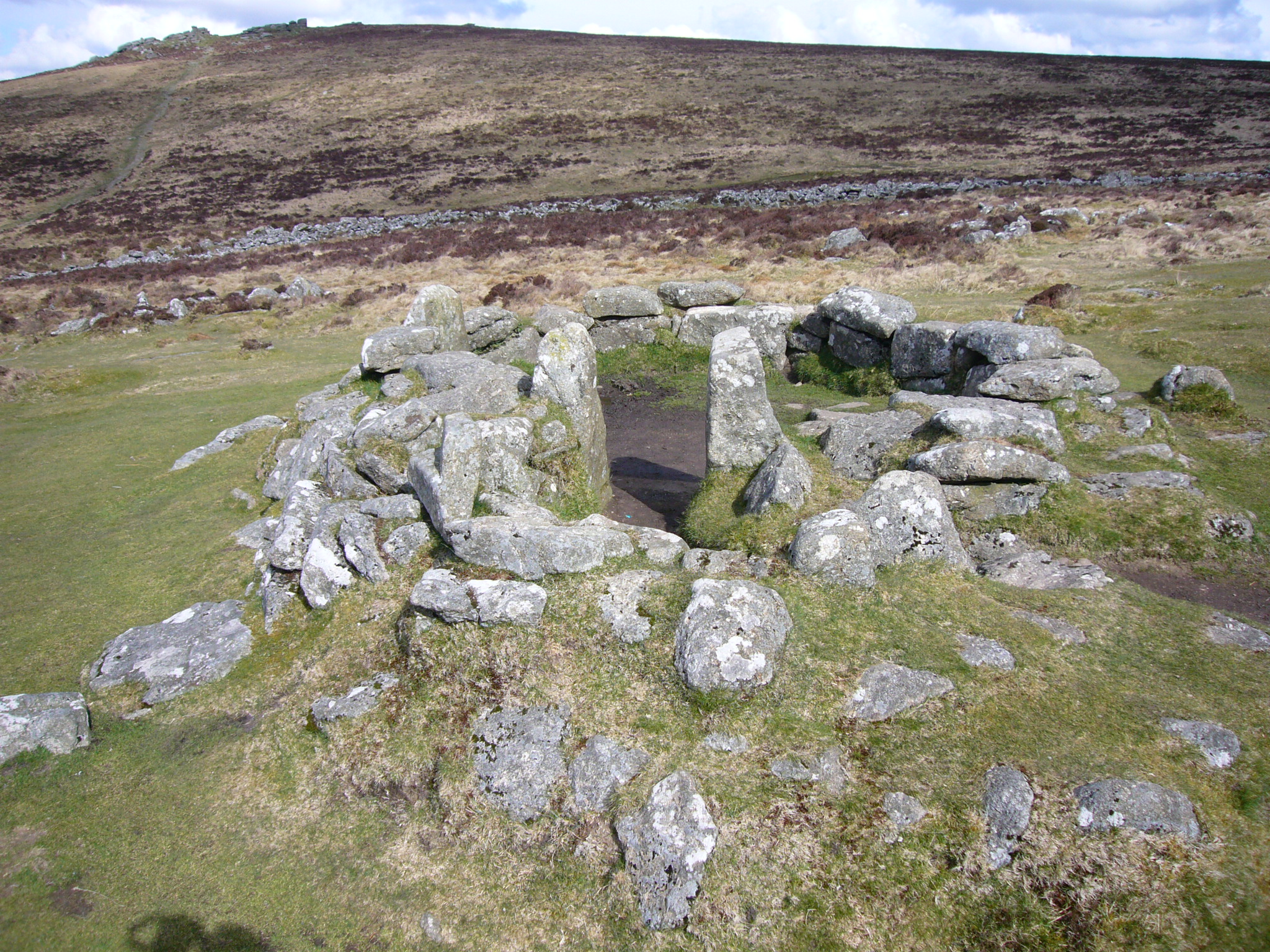
One of Grimspound's hut circles

Twenty-four stone hut circles have been officially recorded here, although there are probably remains of more within the enclosure, which has an area of over 16,000 square metres (four acres). Many of these hut circles feature L-shaped porches. The doorways are paved with naturally flat stones, and all face both downhill and away from the prevailing wind.

The 1894 excavation reported that the huts nearest the entrance (save for Hut 12) were devoid of signs of human habitation, and were therefore used for livestock or storage, as was hut 2 at the opposite side of the compound.

The huts range between 9 and 15 feet (2.7 and 4.6 metres) in diameter, with walls about 3 feet (0.91 metres) thick, made of upright granite slabs packed with an infill of rubble and possibly peat. Excavations at sites such as Holne Moor have shown that such huts had an interior plank lining.

The hearth was variously located at the centre of the hut, or opposite the door. Ash from the hearths was found to be from oak and willow twigs. A lack of log remains and the presence of peat ash shows that by the time of Grimspound's occupation, the local forests had been replaced by enough peat buildup for it to be cut for fuel. Cooking holes contained granite pot boilers, pieces of stone heated in the fire and dropped into pots of water sunk into the ground (the pottery of the time not being fireproof).

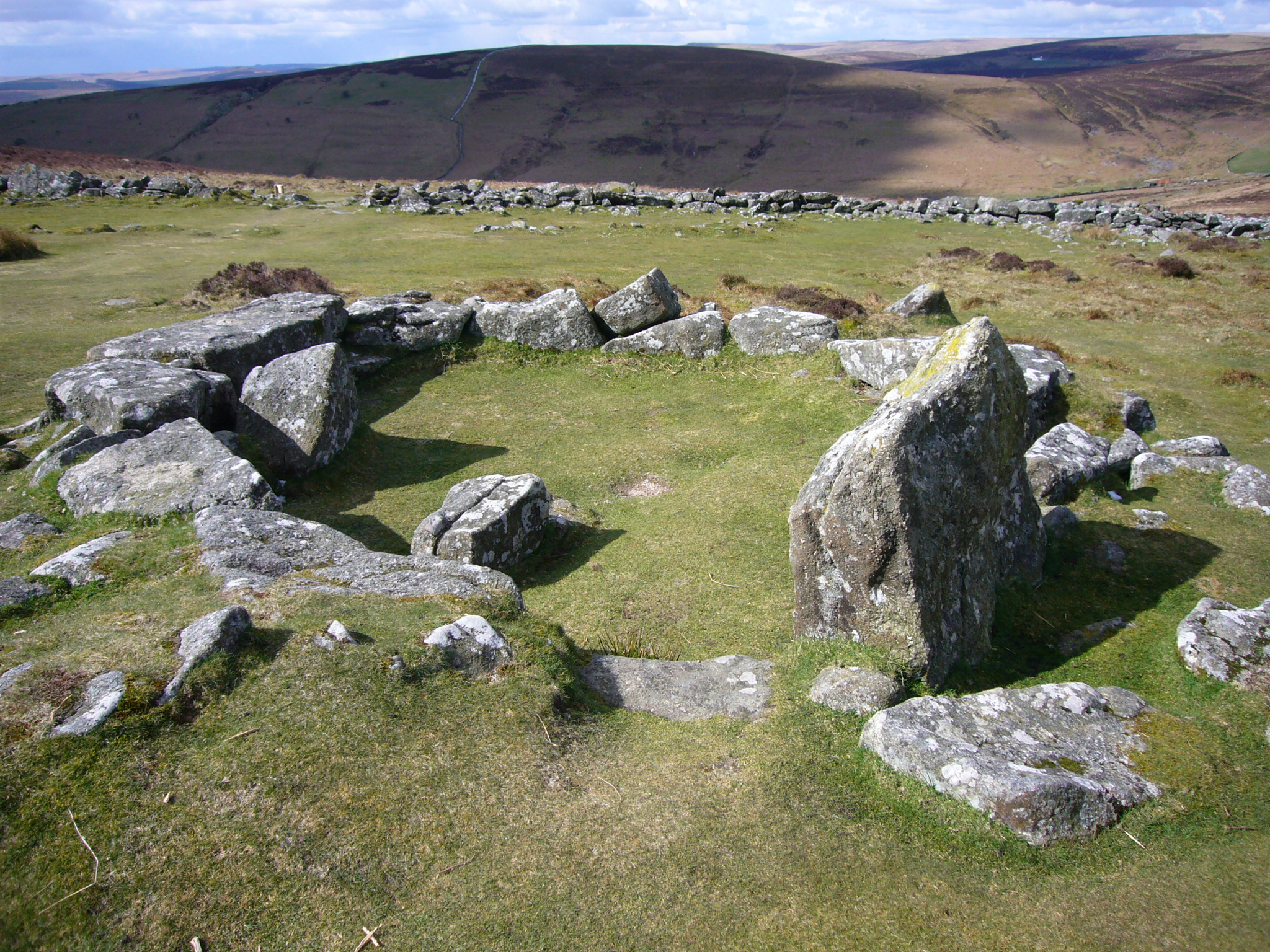
One of Grimspound's hut circles

To the right of each hut entrance is a raised, level area, which the Committee called a "dais" and which was probably the sleeping area.

Four of the huts (3, 7, 17 and 18) contain raised or upright stones, described as "anvil" stones, the purpose of which is unknown.

Unlike many similar sites on Dartmoor, there is no obviously larger hut that can be identified as a headman's dwelling, although the Committee did suggest that a pillar outside Hut 19 could have meant that the headman lived there.

=== Other objects ===
The acidic soil of Dartmoor has destroyed nearly all organic material; it is therefore difficult to tell what Grimspound must have been like during its occupation. A flint arrowhead found nearby, and the lack of querns for grinding cereals, hint at some dependency on goods from outside the area (flint is not local to Dartmoor). The Exploration Committee also declared that the clay used in pottery fragments did not come from a local source.

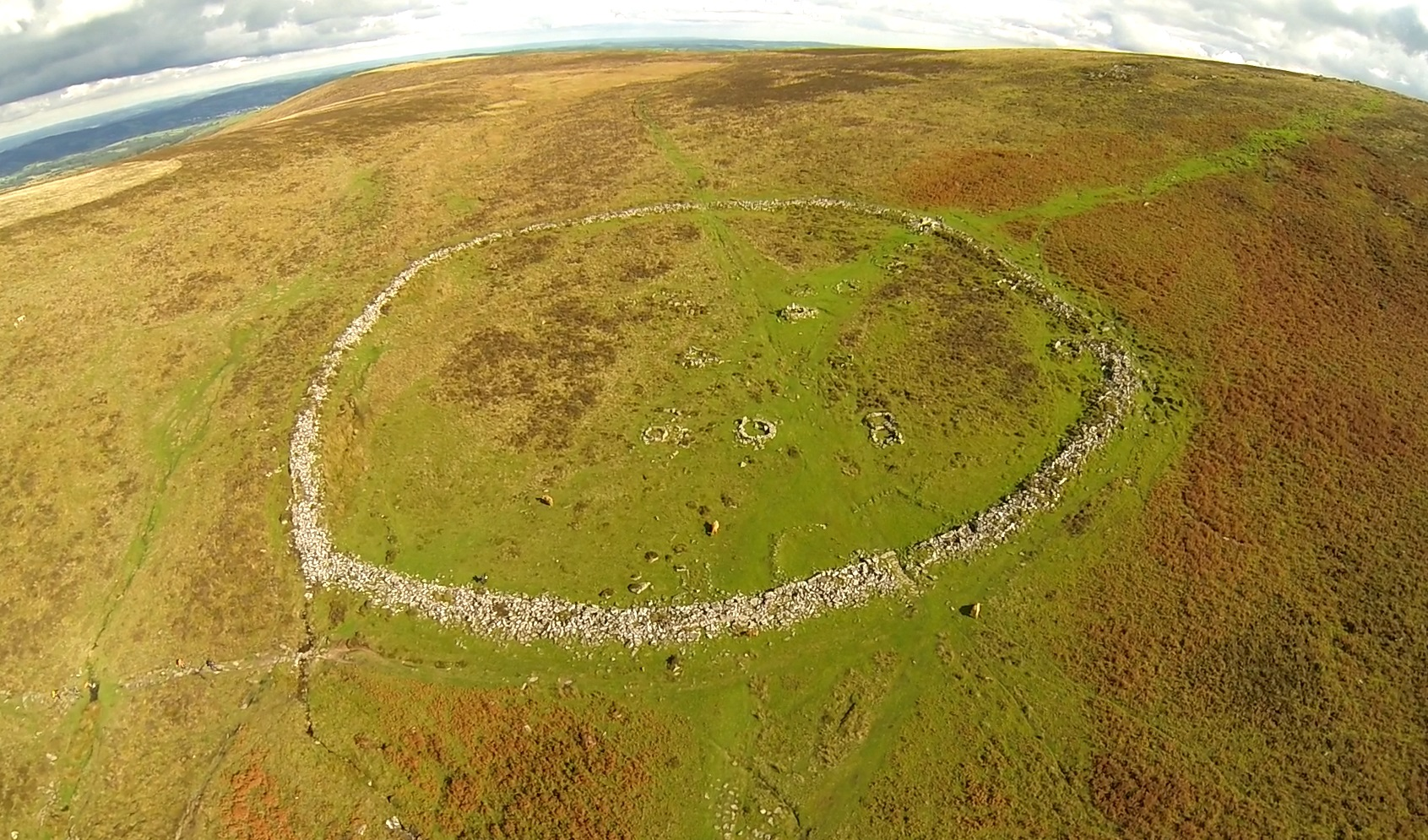
Grimspound Bronze Age settlement on Dartmoor

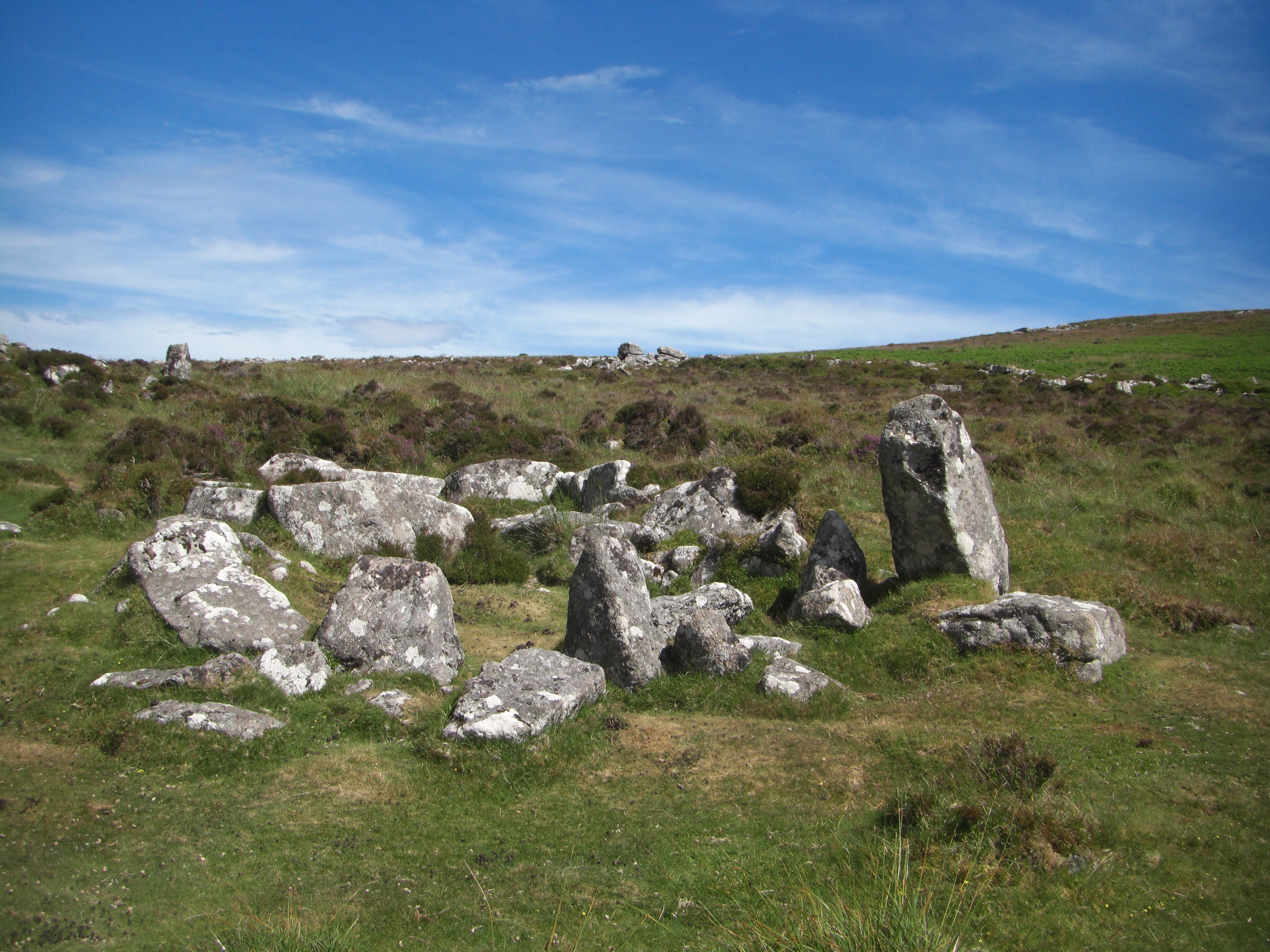
One of the huts at Grimspound

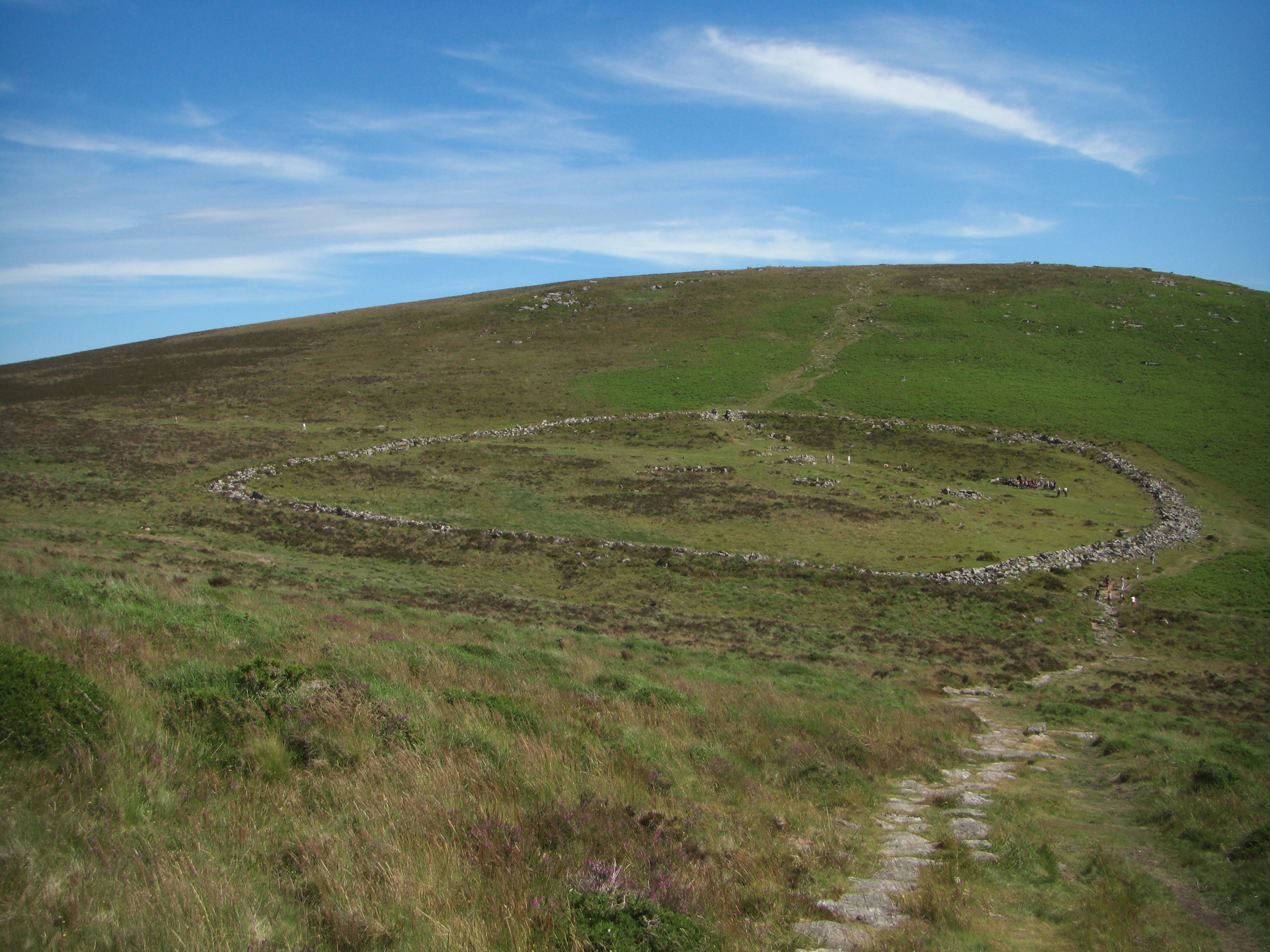
Grimspound
